= Neodymium(III) acetate =

Compound of neodymium

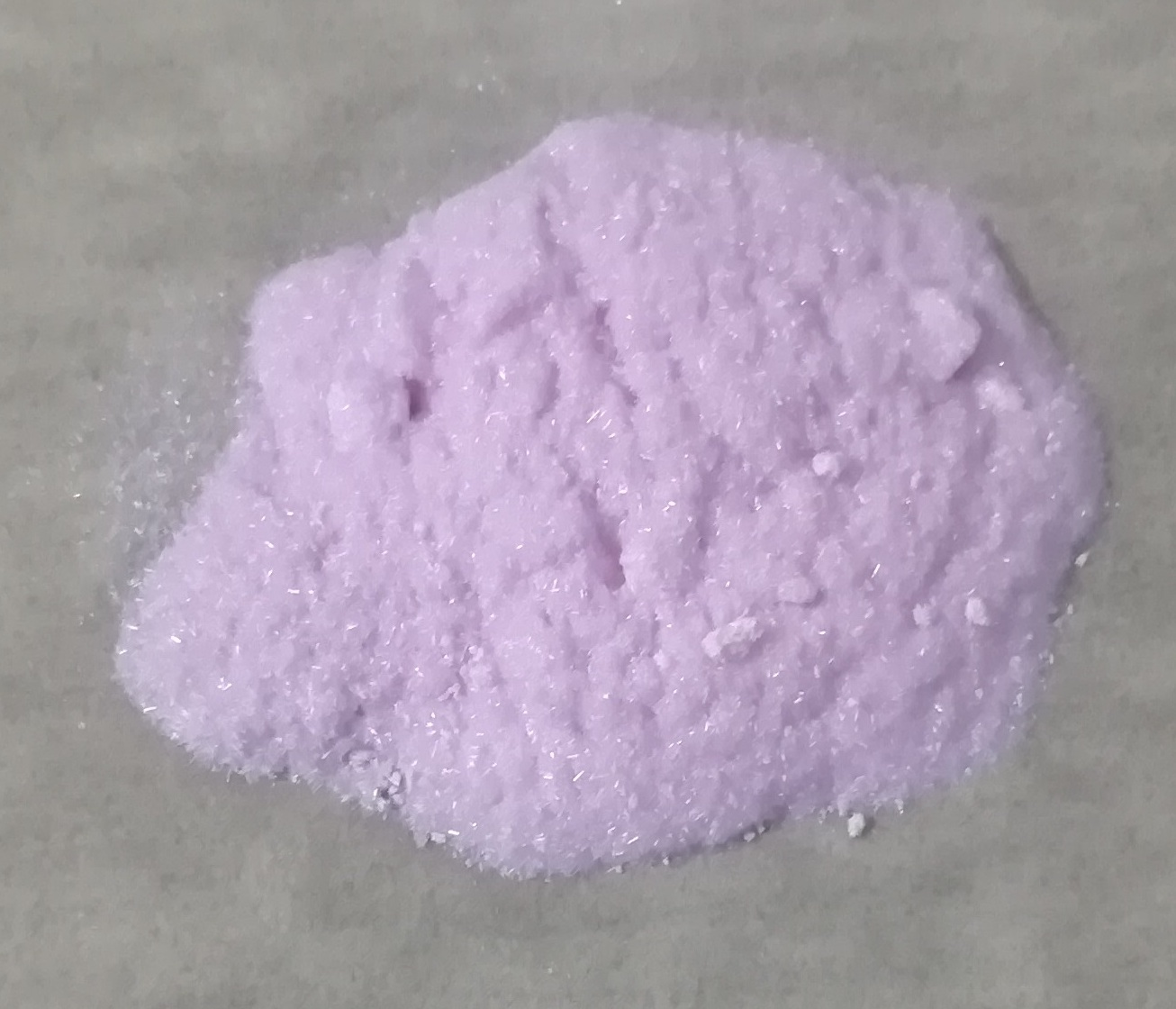
- Neodymium(III) acetate Some neodymium(III) acetate powder. Neodymium(III) acetate can be light purple in colour.

Names
- IUPAC names Tetra-μ^{2}-acetatodiaquadineodymium(III) neodymium(3+) triacetate
- Other names: Neodymium acetate; Neodymium ethanoate; Neodymium triacetate

Identifiers
CAS Number	6192-13-8
3D model (JSmol)	Interactive image
ChemSpider	21161
ECHA InfoCard	100.025.677
EC Number	228-244-5
PubChem CID	22567
UNII	1DH99Q8L73
CompTox Dashboard (EPA)	DTXSID10890616
- InChI: InChI=1S/3C2H4O2.Nd/c3*1-2(3)4;/h3*1H3,(H,3,4);/q;;;+3/p-3 Key: KETUDCKOKOGBJB-UHFFFAOYSA-K
- SMILES: [Nd+3].O=C([O-])C.[O-]C(=O)C.[O-]C(=O)C

Properties
Chemical formula	Nd(O_{2}C_{2}H_{3})_{3}
Molar mass	321.371 (anhydrous)
Appearance	light purple solid (anhydrous) purple solid (hydrate) yellow-green crystals (dihydrate)
Density	2.89 g/cm^{3} (dihydrate), 2.184 g/cm^{3} (hydrate)
Melting point	230°C (predicted)
Boiling point	118°C (predicted)
Solubility in water	7.77 (in water); Moderately soluble in strong mineral acids

Structure
Crystal structure	Triclinic
Space group	P 1

Hazards
- GHS labelling
Pictograms	(GHS07: Exclamation mark)
Signal word	Warning
Hazard statements	H315, H319, H335
Precautionary statements	P261, P264, P271, P280, P302+P352, P305+P351+P338+P315

Related compounds
Other anions	Neodymium(III) carbonate Neodymium(III) oxide Neodymium(III) hydroxide
Other cations	Cerium(III) acetate Praseodymium(III) acetate Samarium(III) acetate Europium(III) acetate
- Except where otherwise noted, data are given for materials in their standard state (at 25 °C [77 °F], 100 kPa). Infobox references

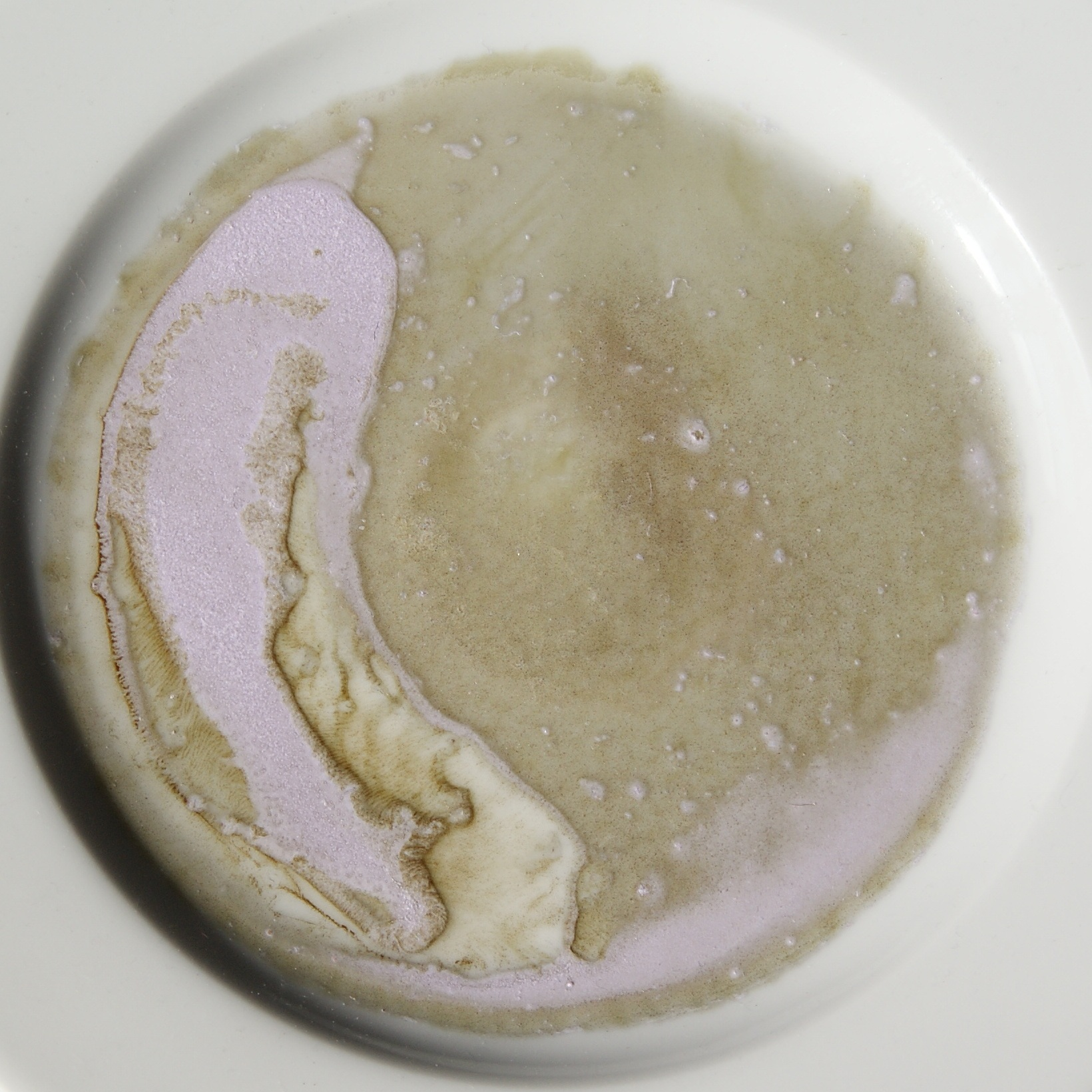
Some neodymium dissolving into acetic acid to form neodymium(III) acetate.

Neodymium(III) acetate is an inorganic salt composed of a neodymium atom trication and three acetate groups as anions where neodymium exhibits the +3 oxidation state. It has a chemical formula of Nd(CH_{3}COO)_{3} although it can be informally referred to as NdAc because Ac is an informal symbol for acetate. It commonly occurs as a light purple powder.

== Physical properties ==
Neodymium(III) acetate as a hydrate is a purple solid that is soluble in water. The solubility of the compound increases when sodium acetate is added, forming a blue complex. It forms crystalline hydrates in the composition of Nd(CH_{3}COO)_{3}·nH_{2}O, where n = 1 and 4 are red-violet crystals that lose water at 110 °C. The crystalline hydrate with the composition of Nd(CH_{3}COO)_{3}·4H_{2}O forms crystals of triclinic crystal system, with the space group of P 1 and the cell parameters of a = 0.9425 nm, b = 0.9932 nm, c = 1.065 nm, α = 88.09°, β = 115 .06°, γ = 123.69°. Most of the Nd^{3+} cations are coordinated by nine (or eight) oxygen atoms of the acetate ligands, which connect these polyhedra into slightly puckered sheets that are stacked in the [010] direction. The crystalline neodymium source is moderately soluble in water, methyl salicylate, benzyl chloride, benzyl alcohol and carbon disulfide. In the temperature range of 320–430 °C, the anhydrate decomposes to form Nd_{2}O_{2}(CO_{3}), which decomposes via a further intermediate stage at 880 °C to neodymium oxide.

=== Appearance ===
Neodymium(III) acetate is a mauve-colored hygroscopic powdery solid. The resulting hydrate, like many other neodymium salts, has the interesting property that it appears different colors under fluorescent light.

== Preparation ==
Neodymium(III) acetate can be formed using neutralisation (acetic acid reacts with neodymium oxide, neodymium hydroxide or neodymium carbonate):

6CH_{3}COOH + Nd_{2}O_{3} → 2Nd(CH_{3}COO)_{3} + 3H_{2}O

3CH_{3}COOH + Nd(OH)_{3} → Nd(CH_{3}COO)_{3} + 3H_{2}O

6CH_{3}COOH + Nd_{2}(CO_{3})_{3} → 2Nd(CH_{3}COO)_{3} + 3H_{2}O + 3CO_{2}↑

It can also be formed in a reaction with a neodymium magnet and acetic acid:

20CH_{3}COOH + Nd_{2}Fe_{14}B → 2Nd(CH_{3}COO)_{3} + 7Fe(CH_{3}COO)_{2} + 10H_{2} + B

The reaction of neodymium(III) chloride and sodium acetate can also produce neodymium(III) acetate:

NdCl_{3} + 3Na(CH_{3}COO) → Nd(CH_{3}COO)_{3} + 3NaCl

It can also be formed by reacting any neodymium salt with acetic acid. Anhydrous neodymium(III) acetate can be obtained by direct oxidation of neodymium with malonic acid in a glass ampoule at 180 °C. It is also possible to prepare the hydrate by dissolving neodymium(III) oxide in glacial acetic acid, alkalinizing it to a pH value of 4 with sodium hydroxide, and then slowly evaporating the solution. With different pH values, different hydrates can be obtained.

== Uses ==
Neodymium(III) acetate can be used for:

- Making ultra high purity compounds
- Making catalysts
- Making nanoscale materials
- A substitute for uranyl acetate in electron microscopy
- Preparing nanoparticles of neodymium(III) oxide.

It might also be used as:

- a skin-conditioner
- an antimicrobial
- a colorant.

=== Substitute for uranyl acetate ===
Uranyl acetate has been the standard contrasting agent in transmission electron microscopy (TEM) for decades. However, its use is increasingly hampered by regulations by governments due to its radioactive properties as well as its high toxicity. Therefore, alternatives are being searched for, including lanthanides or platinum blue as well as the use of less defined substances such as oolong tea extract. Despite these published alternatives, uranyl acetate is still the standard for EM contrasting.

In the periodic table the vertical ordering of elements in groups is based on the presence of the same number of electrons in their outermost shell, which determines their chemical and physical properties. Because neodymium (Nd) is right above uranium (U) the chemical properties of uranyl acetate and neodymium(III) acetate would be very similar in binding to tissue in ultrathin sections thus leading to a similar amount of contrast.

=== Glass ===
Neodymium(III) acetate can also be used for glass, crystal and capacitors. It is useful in protective lenses for welding goggles. It is also used in cathode ray tube screens to increase the contrast between red and green tones. It is highly valued in glass making because of its attractive purple tint to glass.
