= Ammonium neodymium nitrate =

Names
- IUPAC name diazanium;neodymium(3+);pentanitrate
- Other names Diammonium neodymium nitrate, diammonium neodymium pentanitrate

Identifiers
CAS Number	15653-40-4
3D model (JSmol)	Interactive image; tetrahydrate: Interactive image
ChemSpider	21160394
ECHA InfoCard	100.036.095
EC Number	239-721-2
PubChem CID	57370190
- InChI: InChI=1S/5NO3.2H3N.Nd/c5*2-1(3)4;;;/h;;;;;2*1H3;/q5*-1;;;+3/p+2 Key: GHPKFTYZEPZTAF-UHFFFAOYSA-P
- SMILES: [NH4+].[NH4+].[N+](=O)([O-])[O-].[N+](=O)([O-])[O-].[N+](=O)([O-])[O-].[N+](=O)([O-])[O-].[N+](=O)([O-])[O-].[Nd+3]; tetrahydrate: [NH4+].[NH4+].[N+](=O)([O-])[O-].[N+](=O)([O-])[O-].[N+](=O)([O-])[O-].[N+](=O)([O-])[O-].[N+](=O)([O-])[O-].[Nd+3].O.O.O.O

Properties
Chemical formula	H_{8}N_{7}NdO_{15}
Molar mass	490.340 g·mol^{−1}
Appearance	red-violet crystals (hydrate)
Solubility in water	soluble
- Except where otherwise noted, data are given for materials in their standard state (at 25 °C [77 °F], 100 kPa). Infobox references

Ammonium neodymium nitrate is a chemical compound with the chemical formula Nd(NH_{4})_{2}(NO_{3})_{5}. The compound is classified as a rare earth metal salt, belonging to nitrates.

== Synthesis ==
The compound can be prepared by the reaction of neodymium oxide, nitric acid, and ammonium nitrate.

Also, it can be made by a reaction of neodymium oxide or neodymium carbonate with ammonium nitrate, releasing water as a byproduct:

Nd_{2}O_{3} + 6NH_{4}NO_{3} → 2(NH_{4})_{2}Nd(NO_{3})_{5} + 3H_{2}O

== Physical properties ==
Ammonium neodymium nitrate is soluble in water.

The compound forms a tetrahydrate of the composition Nd(NH_{4})_{2}(NO_{3})_{5} • 4H_{2}O—red-violet crystals that melt in their own crystallization water at 47 °C.

== Chemical properties ==
The compound reacts with strong acids to form soluble complexes. It can release nitrogen oxides when decomposed.

== Uses ==
Ammonium neodymium nitrate is used as a precursor for the synthesis of many other neodymium compounds and also as a reagent for various chemical reactions.
