= Neodymium arsenate =

Inorganic chemical compound

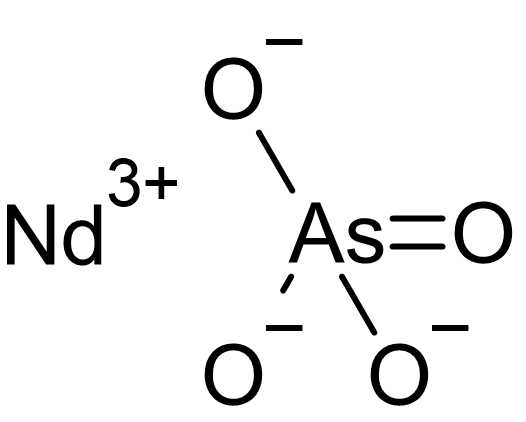

Names
- Other names Neodymium(III) arsenate

Identifiers
CAS Number	15479-84-2
3D model (JSmol)	Interactive image
- InChI: InChI=1S/AsH3O4.Nd/c2-1(3,4)5;/h(H3,2,3,4,5);/q;+3/p-3 Key: NDJXBXBULAKKIO-UHFFFAOYSA-K
- SMILES: [O-][As](=O)([O-])[O-].[Nd+3]

Properties
Chemical formula	NdAsO_{4}
Molar mass	313.89
Appearance	faint pink powder
Density	5.3-5.9 g/cm^{3}
Solubility in water	insoluble

Hazards
- GHS labelling
Pictograms	(GHS06: Toxic) (GHS08: Health hazard) (GHS09: Environmental hazard)
Signal word	Danger
Hazard statements	H300, H314, H350, H410
Precautionary statements	P201, P264, P273, P280, P305+P351+P338, P310

Related compounds
Other anions	Neodymium(III) nitrate Neodymium(III) phosphate Neodymium(III) antimonate Neodymium(III) bismuthate Neodymium(III) carbonate
Other cations	PrAsO_{4}
- Except where otherwise noted, data are given for materials in their standard state (at 25 °C [77 °F], 100 kPa). Infobox references

Neodymium arsenate, also known as neodymium(III) arsenate, is the arsenate of neodymium with the chemical formula of NdAsO_{4}. In this compound, neodymium exhibits the +3 oxidation state. It has good thermaostability, and its pK_{sp,c} is 21.86±0.11.

== Preparation ==
Neodymium arsenate can be obtained from the reaction between sodium arsenate (Na_{3}AsO_{4}) and neodymium chloride (NdCl_{3}) in solution:

Na_{3}AsO_{4} + NdCl_{3} → 3 NaCl + NdAsO_{4}↓

When crystallizing from a lead pyroarsenate flux, neodymium arsenate crystals produced explode when cooled.

Neodymium arsenate also occurs in nature as a mineral, Arsenoflorencite-(Nd).

== See also ==
- Arsenic
