= Promethium arsenate =

Names
- Other names Promethium(III) arsenate

Identifiers
CAS Number	14325-66-7
3D model (JSmol)	Interactive image
- InChI: InChI=1S/AsH3O4.Pm/c2-1(3,4)5;/h(H3,2,3,4,5);/q;+3/p-3 Key: NIPMGKJWCPAFNY-UHFFFAOYSA-K
- SMILES: O=[As]([O-])([O-])[O-].[Pm+3]

Properties
Chemical formula	PmAsO_{4}
Molar mass	283.92 g/mol
Appearance	Pale violet (hydrated precipitate); pink (anhydrous)
Solubility in water	Sparingly soluble in water

Structure
Crystal structure	Tetragonal, xenotime type
Space group	I4_{1}/amd, No. 141
Lattice constant	a = 0.731 nm, c = 0.643 nm
- Except where otherwise noted, data are given for materials in their standard state (at 25 °C [77 °F], 100 kPa). Infobox references

Promethium arsenate is an inorganic compound of promethium and the arsenate ion, with the chemical formula PmAsO_{4}. Like all promethium compounds, it is radioactive. Anhydrous PmAsO_{4} crystallizes in the tetragonal xenotime structure type.

== Preparation ==
Hydrated promethium arsenate can be precipitated from an aqueous solution of a promethium(III) salt by addition of a soluble arsenate.

The original synthesis used promethium(III) chloride and sodium hydrogen arsenate. A pale-violet precipitate, interpreted as hydrated PmAsO_{4}·xH_{2}O, was obtained.

Anhydrous PmAsO_{4} was produced by heating the precipitate for approximately 20–57 hours at 800–950 °C.

A precipitation route using promethium nitrate and sodium dihydrogen arsenate has also been reported for rare-earth arsenates.

== Properties ==
=== Crystal structure ===
Anhydrous promethium arsenate is pink and crystallizes in the tetragonal crystal system with the xenotime structure type, space group I4_{1}/amd (No. 141).

Its lattice parameters are approximately a = 7.31 Å and c = 6.43 Å giving c/a ≈ 0.880.

The structure consists of AsO^{3−}_{4} tetrahedra and eight-coordinate Pm^{3+} ions, as in other xenotime-type rare-earth arsenates.

PmAsO_{4} is structurally important within the rare-earth arsenate series. Neodymium arsenate, NdAsO_{4}, crystallizes in the monoclinic monazite structure, whereas PmAsO_{4} and the arsenates of the smaller rare-earth ions adopt the tetragonal xenotime structure. The structural boundary therefore lies between NdAsO_{4} and PmAsO_{4}.

Although a monazite-type modification of PmAsO_{4} has sometimes been inferred in older structural discussions, its existence has not been experimentally demonstrated.

=== Radioactivity ===
Promethium has no stable isotopes, so all samples of PmAsO_{4} are radioactive. Consequently, studies of the compound have generally been limited to small quantities and structural characterization rather than bulk physical-property measurements.
