= Praseodymium arsenate =

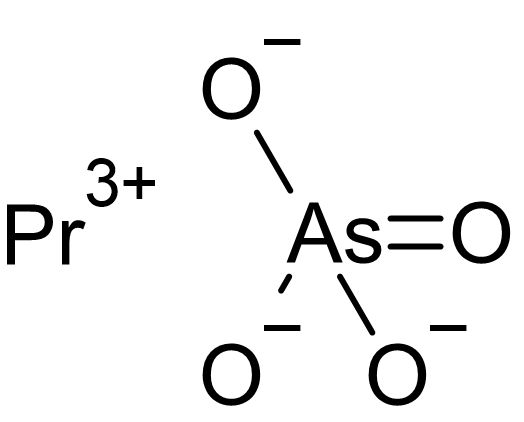

Identifiers
CAS Number	15479-86-4
3D model (JSmol)	Interactive image
ChemSpider	21428531
PubChem CID	25022094
- InChI: InChI=1S/AsH3O4.Pr/c2-1(3,4)5;/h(H3,2,3,4,5);/q;+3/p-3 Key: WIIWZOSBVGBHHO-UHFFFAOYSA-K
- SMILES: [O-][As](=O)([O-])[O-].[Pr+3]

Properties
Chemical formula	PrAsO_{4}
Appearance	solid
Solubility in water	insoluble

Related compounds
Other anions	Praseodymium(III) nitrate Praseodymium(III) phosphate Praseodymium(III) antimonate Praseodymium(III) bismuthate Praseodymium(III) carbonate
Other cations	NdAsO_{4}
- Except where otherwise noted, data are given for materials in their standard state (at 25 °C [77 °F], 100 kPa). Infobox references

Praseodymium arsenate is the arsenate salt of praseodymium, with the chemical formula of PrAsO_{4}. It has good thermal stability. Its ferroelectric transition temperature is 52°C.

== Preparation ==
Praseodymium arsenate be prepared by reacting sodium arsenate (Na_{3}AsO_{4}) and praseodymium chloride (PrCl_{3}) in a solution:

Na_{3}AsO_{4} + PrCl_{3} → 3 NaCl + PrAsO_{4}↓

The product can also be obtained by reacting praseodymium(III,IV) oxide and diammonium hydrogen arsenate in hot dilute nitric acid in a stoichiometric ratio.
