= Neodymium hexaboride =

Names
- Other names Neodymium boride

Identifiers
CAS Number	12008-23-0
ECHA InfoCard	100.031.380
EC Number	234-532-1
PubChem CID	92027446
CompTox Dashboard (EPA)	DTXSID601010270

Properties
Chemical formula	NdB_{6}
Molar mass	209.10 g/mol

Structure
Crystal structure	Cubic, CaB_{6}-type
Space group	Pm3̅m (No. 221)
Lattice constant	a = 4.1269 Å
Formula units (Z)	1
- Except where otherwise noted, data are given for materials in their standard state (at 25 °C [77 °F], 100 kPa). Infobox references

Neodymium hexaboride is a binary inorganic compound of neodymium and boron with the formula NdB_{6}. It is a refractory rare-earth boride that crystallizes in the cubic calcium hexaboride structure. NdB_{6} is metallic and undergoes antiferromagnetic ordering at approximately 8 K. Its relatively low work function has also led to investigation of the material and its nanostructures for electron-emission applications.

== Preparation ==
Neodymium hexaboride can be prepared by heating mixtures of neodymium(III) oxide and elemental boron at high temperature under vacuum. It can also be synthesized by reduction of neodymium(III) oxide with boron carbide. In one method, single-phase NdB_{6} powder was produced under a vacuum of approximately 10^{−2} Pa by heating the starting mixture above 1773 K for 4 hours.

The overall carbothermal reaction can be represented as:

Nd_{2}O_{3} + 3B_{4}C → 2NdB_{6} + 3CO

The resulting particles in this process were typically 2–4 μm in diameter, with larger aggregates of approximately 4–8 μm.

NdB_{6} has also been prepared under high-pressure and high-temperature conditions by reducing neodymium oxide with elemental boron. This method produces phase-pure NdB_{6}, while residual neodymium oxide and metallic neodymium can be removed by treatment with hydrochloric acid.

Nanocrystalline NdB_{6} can be prepared at room temperature by mechanochemical reduction of B_{2}O_{3} with magnesium in the presence of neodymium metal:

Nd + 3B_{2}O_{3} + 9Mg → NdB_{6} + 9MgO

After 15 hours of high-energy milling and removal of the MgO by-product, crystallites with an average size of approximately 18 nm were obtained.

Large single crystals can be grown by the optical floating-zone technique. High-quality [100]-oriented crystals approximately 9 mm in diameter have been produced using two successive floating-zone passes.

== Properties ==
=== Crystal structure ===
Neodymium hexaboride crystallizes in the cubic crystal system, space group Pm3̅m (No. 221), with the CaB_{6}-type structure. A precise X-ray diffraction study gave a lattice parameter of approximately 4.127 Å.

The structure contains B_{6} octahedra connected to one another to form a three-dimensional boron framework. The neodymium atoms form a simple cubic sublattice, occupying the large cavities between the B_{6} octahedra. Each neodymium atom is surrounded by 24 nearby boron atoms, while each B_{6} octahedron is surrounded by eight neodymium atoms.

Rietveld refinement of nanocrystalline material gave a lattice parameter of 4.1254(2) Å, in close agreement with measurements on bulk material.

=== Magnetic properties ===
NdB_{6} is paramagnetic at higher temperatures and becomes antiferromagnetic below approximately 8 K. Magnetic susceptibility measurements found a Néel temperature of 8.45 K.

Neutron diffraction measurements confirmed the antiferromagnetic ordering and gave a Néel temperature of approximately 8.6 K. The magnetic structure involves a doubling of the chemical unit cell along one crystallographic direction. At 4.2 K, the ordered magnetic moment was measured as 1.74 μ_{B} per neodymium ion. The ordered state is generally described as an A-type collinear antiferromagnetic structure.

Heat-capacity measurements of single-crystalline NdB_{6} show a sharp anomaly associated with the magnetic transition. One study found the transition at 7.45 K in zero magnetic field; applying a magnetic field of 3 T shifted the anomaly slightly to approximately 7.6 K. A broad Schottky anomaly is also observed around 50 K as a result of the crystalline-electric-field splitting of the Nd^{3+} states.

=== Electronic and transport properties ===
Neodymium hexaboride is metallic. Its conduction states involve hybridization between the boron 2p states and neodymium electronic states, while the localized neodymium 4f electrons are responsible for much of its magnetic behaviour.

Hall-effect measurements on NdB_{6} single crystals between 2 and 300 K found a negative Hall coefficient, consistent with electron-like charge carriers. Between approximately 10 and 20 K, the Hall coefficient is nearly temperature-independent at about −3.7×10^{−4} cm^{3} C^{−1}. A step-like anomaly occurs near 25 K, substantially above the Néel temperature.

=== Mechanical properties ===
Like other rare-earth hexaborides, NdB_{6} is a hard refractory ceramic. Measurements on dense hot-pressed material gave a microhardness of 23.8 GPa and a nanoindentation hardness of 28.8 GPa. The elastic modulus was approximately 484 GPa, the fracture toughness was 3.04 MPa m^{1/2}, and the three-point flexural strength was 156 MPa.

Hot pressing NdB_{6} powder at 1800 °C for 2 hours under vacuum produced material with approximately 93% of its theoretical density. Addition of 5 wt.% B_{4}C as a sintering aid increased the density to 99.9% of the theoretical value.

== Electron emission ==
Rare-earth hexaborides are of interest as thermionic and field-emission materials because of their relatively low work functions. Measurements by ultraviolet photoelectron spectroscopy on the NdB_{6} (100) surface gave a work function of 2.806 eV. Thermionic-emission measurements gave an average effective work function of 2.8 ± 0.1 eV, in good agreement with theoretical calculations.

One-dimensional NdB_{6} nanostructures have consequently been investigated as field emitters. Single-crystalline nanowires prepared from neodymium metal and boron trichloride had a field-emission turn-on field of 5.55 V μm^{−1} at a current density of 10 μA cm^{−2} and a field-enhancement factor of 1037.

Vertically aligned NdB_{6} nanorods prepared by reaction of Nd(OH)_{3} with NaBH_{4} at 1000 °C have shown turn-on fields below 4.5 V μm^{−1} and field-enhancement factors as high as 2263.
