= Neodymium(III) nitride =

Chemical compound

Names
- Other names Neodymium mononitride, azanylidyneneodymium

Identifiers
CAS Number	25764-11-8
3D model (JSmol)	Interactive image
ChemSpider	105116
ECHA InfoCard	100.042.937
EC Number	247-246-7
PubChem CID	117628
CompTox Dashboard (EPA)	DTXSID4067141
- InChI: InChI=1S/N.Nd Key: OVMJQLNJCSIJCH-UHFFFAOYSA-N
- SMILES: N#[Nd]

Properties
Chemical formula	NdN
Molar mass	158.25 g/mol

Structure
Crystal structure	Rock Salt (cubic)
Space group	Fm3̅m (No. 225)
Lattice constant	a = 512.4 pm
Formula units (Z)	4

Hazards
- GHS labelling
Pictograms	(GHS07: Exclamation mark)

Related compounds
Other anions	Neodymium(III) arsenide Neodymium(III) phosphide Neodymium(III) antimonide Neodymium(III) bismuthide Neodymium(III) oxide
Other cations	PrN
- Except where otherwise noted, data are given for materials in their standard state (at 25 °C [77 °F], 100 kPa). verify (what is ?) Infobox references

Neodymium(III) nitride is a chemical compound of neodymium and nitrogen with the formula NdN in which neodymium exhibits the +3 oxidation state and nitrogen exhibits the −3 oxidation state. It is ferromagnetic, like gadolinium(III) nitride, terbium(III) nitride and dysprosium(III) nitride. Neodymium(III) nitride is not usually stoichiometric, and it is very hard to create pure stoichiometric neodymium nitride.

== Preparation ==
Neodymium(III) nitride can be prepared via an exothermic metathesis reaction between lithium nitride and anhydrous neodymium(III) chloride. Lithium chloride formed in the reaction can be removed by THF, a chemical in which lithium chloride dissolves.

NdCl_{3} + Li_{3}N → NdN + 3 LiCl

It can also be prepared directly when neodymium reacts directly with nitrogen:

2 Nd + N_{2} → 2 NdN

It can be prepared when decomposing neodymium amide:

Nd(NH_{2})_{3} → NdN + N_{2} + 3H_{2}

It can also be produced when neodymium is ignited in air (which contains nitrogen), but this also produces other compounds, such as neodymium oxide.

== See also ==
- Lanthanide
