= Neodymium monoxide =

Names
- IUPAC name Neodymium monoxide

Identifiers
CAS Number	12035-20-0
3D model (JSmol)	Interactive image
- InChI: InChI=1S/Nd.O
- SMILES: [Nd].[O]

Properties
Chemical formula	NdO
Molar mass	160.24 g/mol
Appearance	Golden-yellow solid with a metallic luster

Structure
Crystal structure	Cubic, rock salt
Space group	Fm3̅m (No. 225)
Lattice constant	a = 4.994(5) Å
Formula units (Z)	4
- Except where otherwise noted, data are given for materials in their standard state (at 25 °C [77 °F], 100 kPa). Infobox references

Neodymium monoxide is a binary inorganic compound of neodymium and oxygen with the formula NdO. It is a metastable rare-earth monoxide with the rock salt structure. Bulk NdO can be prepared by reaction of neodymium metal with neodymium(III) oxide at high pressure and temperature and is retained metastably after the pressure is released. It is metallic and has an electronic structure more complicated than the simple ionic formulation Nd^{2+}O^{2−}.

Epitaxial NdO thin films are ferromagnetic metals with a Curie temperature of approximately 19 K, in contrast to the paramagnetic behaviour reported for bulk polycrystalline material.

== Preparation ==
Bulk neodymium monoxide was first reliably prepared by reacting neodymium metal with neodymium(III) oxide under high pressure:

Nd_{2}O_{3} + Nd → 3NdO

The reaction was carried out at approximately 5 GPa and 1000 °C. The starting materials were heated for several hours in a boron nitride crucible using a tantalum heater. The resulting product was a golden-yellow solid with a metallic luster and could be recovered after decompression.

Oxidation measurements indicated that the product was close to the monoxide composition, with fewer than about 9% oxygen atom vacancies. Earlier materials assigned to NdO had substantially larger lattice parameters and were subsequently identified as phases containing nitrogen or hydrogen rather than pure neodymium monoxide.

A later synthesis carried out at 5 GPa and 1473 K again produced rocksalt-structure NdO and was used for thermochemical and X-ray photoelectron spectroscopy measurements.

NdO can also be stabilized as an epitaxial thin film. Rocksalt-structure NdO (001) films have been prepared by pulsed laser deposition from metallic neodymium onto YAlO_{3} substrates under low oxygen partial pressures. The films are protected from oxidation by an amorphous aluminium oxide capping layer.

== Properties ==
=== Structure and stability ===
Neodymium monoxide crystallizes in the cubic crystal system with the rock salt structure, space group Fm3̅m (No. 225). The high-pressure bulk material reported in 1980 had a lattice parameter of a = 4.994 ± 0.005 Å. Later experimental determinations have reported values close to 5.00 Å.

In the rock salt structure, each neodymium atom is surrounded octahedrally by six oxygen atoms and each oxygen atom by six neodymium atoms. The relatively small lattice parameter compared with compounds containing clearly divalent neodymium was one of the original indications that the electronic state of neodymium in NdO cannot be described simply as Nd^{2+}.

Bulk NdO is metastable at ambient conditions. On exposure to air, the high-pressure product slowly decomposes, forming hexagonal neodymium(III) hydroxide, Nd(OH)_{3}.

=== Electronic properties ===
Neodymium monoxide is metallic. Its electronic structure differs from that of EuO and other monoxides containing conventional divalent lanthanide ions. In early rare-earth monoxides such as NdO, an electronic configuration involving essentially trivalent rare-earth ions together with an itinerant conduction electron has been proposed.

Electrical measurements of epitaxial NdO films show metallic temperature dependence. Hall-effect measurements indicate a high electron concentration consistent with approximately one itinerant electron per neodymium atom. X-ray photoelectron spectroscopy of bulk high-pressure NdO shows a shift of the Nd 3d levels to higher binding energy relative to Nd_{2}O_{3}, further indicating that the electronic state in NdO is not adequately represented by a simple localized Nd^{2+} model.

=== Magnetic properties ===
Bulk polycrystalline NdO prepared under high pressure was reported to be paramagnetic. Epitaxial thin films behave differently. A 2019 study found ferromagnetism in rocksalt NdO films with a Curie temperature of 19.1 ± 1.8 K. The ferromagnetism was attributed primarily to direct Nd–Nd exchange interactions associated with the comparatively short distance between neodymium atoms. The films also exhibit negative magnetoresistance and an anomalous Hall effect.

The magnetic and electrical properties depend strongly on film thickness. In films with thicknesses decreasing from 45 to 3 nm, electrical resistivity increases and the Curie temperature decreases. Films 9 and 12 nm thick retain a small remanent magnetization and anomalous Hall effect at temperatures as high as approximately 40 K, well above the main ferromagnetic transition. This has been interpreted as evidence for an additional weakly ferromagnetic state.

== Thermochemistry ==
The formation of NdO from neodymium metal and neodymium(III) oxide is thermodynamically unfavourable at ambient pressure, explaining the requirement for high-pressure synthesis.

High-temperature solution calorimetry of high-pressure NdO gave an enthalpy of 26 ± 9 kJ mol^{−1} for the reaction

1/_{3} Nd_{2}O_{3} + 1/_{3} Nd (bcc) → NdO

where the neodymium metal is in its high-pressure body-centered cubic modification. Differential scanning calorimetry gave an enthalpy of approximately 5.2 kJ mol^{−1} for conversion of ordinary double hexagonal close-packed neodymium to the body-centered cubic phase.

From these measurements, the calculated pressure–temperature boundary for NdO formation has a negative slope of approximately −1.68×10^{−4} GPa K^{−1}, consistent with stabilization of the monoxide by elevated pressure.

== See also ==
- Neodymium(III) oxide
- Samarium monoxide
- Europium(II) oxide
