= Neodymium =

Neodymium, _{60}Nd
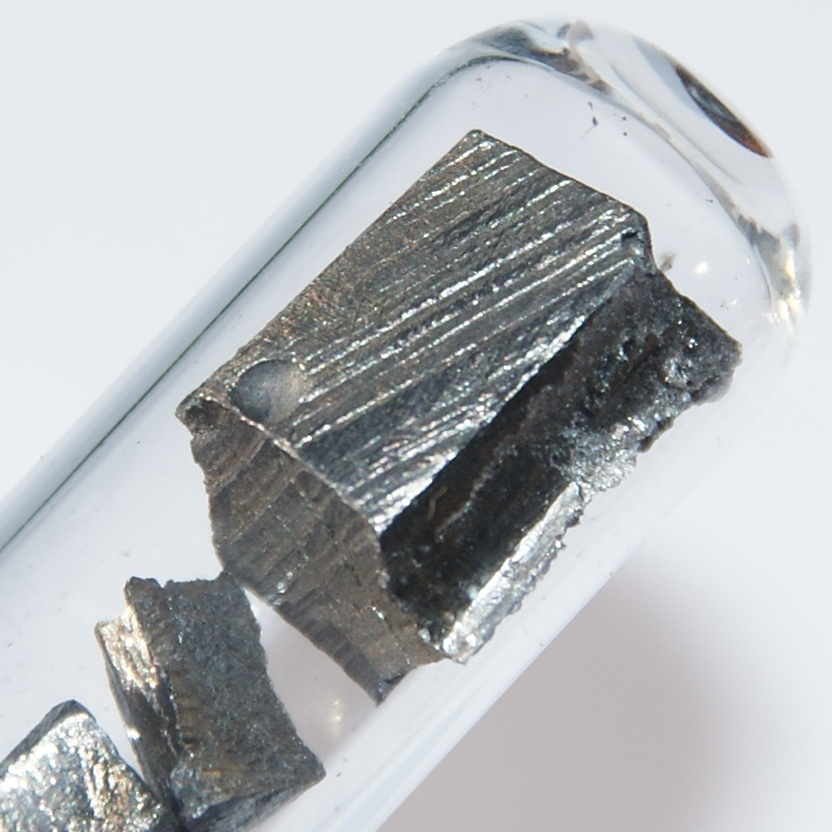
- Neodymium metal in a glass vial

Neodymium
- Pronunciation: /ˌniːoʊˈdɪmiəm/ (nee-oh-DIM-ee-əm)
- Appearance: silvery white

Standard atomic weight A_{r}°(Nd)
- 144.242±0.003; 144.24±0.01 (abridged)

Neodymium in the periodic table
| Hydrogen | | | | | | | | | | | | | | | | | | | | | | | | | | | | | | | Helium |
| Lithium | Beryllium | | | | | | | | | | | | | | | | | | | | | | | | | Boron | Carbon | Nitrogen | Oxygen | Fluorine | Neon |
| Sodium | Magnesium | | | | | | | | | | | | | | | | | | | | | | | | | Aluminium | Silicon | Phosphorus | Sulfur | Chlorine | Argon |
| Potassium | Calcium | | | | | | | | | | | | | | | Scandium | Titanium | Vanadium | Chromium | Manganese | Iron | Cobalt | Nickel | Copper | Zinc | Gallium | Germanium | Arsenic | Selenium | Bromine | Krypton |
| Rubidium | Strontium | | | | | | | | | | | | | | | Yttrium | Zirconium | Niobium | Molybdenum | Technetium | Ruthenium | Rhodium | Palladium | Silver | Cadmium | Indium | Tin | Antimony | Tellurium | Iodine | Xenon |
| Caesium | Barium | Lanthanum | Cerium | Praseodymium | Neodymium | Promethium | Samarium | Europium | Gadolinium | Terbium | Dysprosium | Holmium | Erbium | Thulium | Ytterbium | Lutetium | Hafnium | Tantalum | Tungsten | Rhenium | Osmium | Iridium | Platinum | Gold | Mercury (element) | Thallium | Lead | Bismuth | Polonium | Astatine | Radon |
| Francium | Radium | Actinium | Thorium | Protactinium | Uranium | Neptunium | Plutonium | Americium | Curium | Berkelium | Californium | Einsteinium | Fermium | Mendelevium | Nobelium | Lawrencium | Rutherfordium | Dubnium | Seaborgium | Bohrium | Hassium | Meitnerium | Darmstadtium | Roentgenium | Copernicium | Nihonium | Flerovium | Moscovium | Livermorium | Tennessine | Oganesson |
–
↑
Nd
↓
U
praseodymium ← neodymium → promethium
- Atomic number (Z): 60
- Group: f-block groups (no number)
- Period: period 6
- Block: f-block
- Electron configuration: [Xe] 4f^{4} 6s^{2}
- Electrons per shell: 2, 8, 18, 22, 8, 2

Physical properties
- Phase at STP: solid
- Melting point: 1295 K (1022 °C, 1872 °F)
- Boiling point: 3347 K (3074 °C, 5565 °F)
- Density (at 20° C): 7.007 g/cm^{3}
- when liquid (at m.p.): 6.89 g/cm^{3}
- Heat of fusion: 7.14 kJ/mol
- Heat of vaporization: 289 kJ/mol
- Molar heat capacity: 27.45 J/(mol·K)
- Specific heat capacity: 190.308 J/(kg·K)
Vapor pressure
| P (Pa) | 1 | 10 | 100 | 1 k | 10 k | 100 k |
|---|---|---|---|---|---|---|
| at T (K) | 1595 | 1774 | 1998 | (2296) | (2715) | (3336) |

Atomic properties
- Oxidation states: common: +3; 0, +2, +4
- Electronegativity: Pauling scale: 1.14
- Ionization energies: 1st: 533.1 kJ/mol; 2nd: 1040 kJ/mol; 3rd: 2130 kJ/mol
- Atomic radius: empirical: 181 pm
- Covalent radius: 201±6 pm
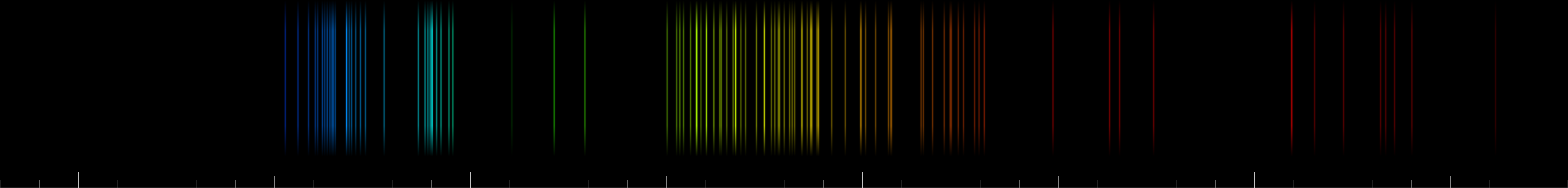
- Spectral lines of neodymium

Other properties
- Natural occurrence: primordial
- Crystal structure: double hexagonal close-packed (dhcp) (hP4)
- Lattice constants: a = 0.36583 nm c = 1.17968 nm (at 20 °C)
- Thermal expansion: 6.7×10^{−6}/K (at 20 °C) (Note: The thermal expansion is anisotropic: the parameters (at 20 °C) for each crystal axis are α_{a} = 4.8×10^{−6}/K, α_{c} = 10.5×10^{−6}/K, and α_{average} = α_{V}/3 = 6.7×10^{−6}/K.)
- Thermal conductivity: 16.5 W/(m⋅K)
- Electrical resistivity: poly: 643 nΩ⋅m
- Magnetic ordering: paramagnetic, antiferromagnetic below 20 K
- Molar magnetic susceptibility: +5628.0×10^{−6} cm^{3}/mol (287.7 K)
- Young's modulus: 41.4 GPa
- Shear modulus: 16.3 GPa
- Bulk modulus: 31.8 GPa
- Speed of sound thin rod: 2330 m/s (at 20 °C)
- Poisson ratio: 0.281
- Vickers hardness: 345–745 MPa
- Brinell hardness: 265–700 MPa
- CAS Number: 7440-00-8

History
- Naming: after Greek νέος, "new", and δίδυμος, "twin" (of lanthanum)
- Discovery: Carl Gustaf Mosander (1841)
- First isolation: Carl Auer von Welsbach (1885)
- Named by: Carl Auer von Welsbach (1885)

Isotopes of neodymium
| Main isotopes | | | Decay | |
| Isotope | abundance | half-life (t_{1/2}) | mode | product |
|---|---|---|---|---|
| ^{140}Nd | synth | 3.37 d | β^{+} | ^{140}Pr |
| ^{142}Nd | 27.2% | stable | | |
| ^{143}Nd | 12.2% | stable | | |
| ^{144}Nd | 23.8% | 2.29×10^{15} y | α | ^{140}Ce |
| ^{145}Nd | 8.3% | stable | | |
| ^{146}Nd | 17.2% | stable | | |
| ^{147}Nd | synth | 10.98 d | β^{−} | ^{147}Pm |
| ^{148}Nd | 5.8% | stable | | |
| ^{150}Nd | 5.6% | 9.3×10^{18} y | β^{−}β^{−} | ^{150}Sm |

Neodymium is a chemical element with the symbol Nd and atomic number 60. It is a silvery-white metal belonging to the lanthanide series and is one of the rare-earth elements. The metal tarnishes in air and reacts with water. Its compounds predominantly contain neodymium in the +3 oxidation state, although +2 and +4 compounds are also known. Natural neodymium contains seven isotopes, two of which are radioactive with extremely long half-lives.

The Austrian chemist Carl Auer von Welsbach discovered neodymium in 1885 when he separated didymium, previously regarded as an element, into neodymium and praseodymium. Its name derives from the Greek for 'new twin'. Neodymium occurs with other rare-earth elements in minerals such as bastnäsite and monazite, from which it is separated during refining. China is the largest producer and refiner of the rare-earth elements used in magnets, including neodymium.

Neodymium is used in neodymium–iron–boron magnets, which produce strong magnetic fields from small, lightweight components. These permanent magnets are used in audio equipment, computer hard disk drives, electric vehicle motors and the generators of some wind turbines. Neodymium compounds are also used as catalysts in the manufacture of synthetic rubber.

Neodymium imparts color to glass and is used in decorative glassware and optical filters. Its selective absorption of light can make the glass appear different colors under different illumination. Neodymium ions also provide the active component in solid-state lasers, including Nd:YAG lasers and neodymium-glass lasers, used in manufacturing, medicine and inertial confinement fusion research. Neodymium isotope ratios are used in dating rocks and tracing geological processes and past ocean circulation. Neodymium can serve as an enzyme cofactor in certain bacteria, while finely divided metal and powerful neodymium magnets present chemical and physical hazards.

== Physical properties ==
Neodymium is a silvery-white metal with a density of 7.01 g/cm^{3} at room temperature. The freshly exposed metal has a bright luster but soon tarnishes in air. It melts at approximately 1,024 °C (1,875 °F) and boils at 3,074 °C (5,565 °F).

High-purity polycrystalline neodymium has a measured electrical resistivity of approximately 65 μΩ·cm at 18 °C (64 °F). Ultrasonic measurements have yielded ambient-pressure bulk and shear moduli of approximately 33 and 14 GPa, respectively, describing the metal's resistance to compression and shear deformation.

At room temperature and atmospheric pressure, neodymium has a double hexagonal close-packed (dhcp) structure. Its close-packed atomic layers repeat in an ABAC sequence, creating two distinct environments for the atoms: those in the A layers have approximately cubic local symmetry, whereas those in the B and C layers have hexagonal local symmetry. On heating at atmospheric pressure, this structure transforms into a body-centered cubic phase at about 863 °C (1,585 °F).

Compression produces a different sequence of transformations. At room temperature, the metal passes through face-centered cubic and distorted face-centered cubic phases before adopting a monoclinic structure at pressures above approximately 75 GPa.

Neodymium is paramagnetic at room temperature and develops antiferromagnetic order below approximately 19.9 K. Further cooling produces several magnetic phases involving the two types of atomic site. Their arrangement depends on temperature and on the strength and direction of an applied magnetic field.

Experiments on crystalline neodymium films have identified a self-induced spin-glass state, in which the magnetic arrangement remains disordered and evolves slowly despite the ordered crystal lattice. On warming, these films can become more magnetically ordered, with a glassy state observed near 5 K and extended ordered domains at 11 K.

== Chemical properties ==
Neodymium lies between praseodymium and promethium in the lanthanide series of the periodic table. Its electron configuration is [Xe]4f^{4}6s^{2}: four 4f electrons and two 6s electrons lie outside a closed-shell xenon core. Its most common oxidation state is +3. Formation of the Nd^{3+} ion removes the two 6s electrons and one 4f electron, leaving the configuration [Xe]4f^{3}. The remaining 4f electrons are more tightly bound, favoring the trivalent state. Compounds containing neodymium in the +2 and +4 oxidation states are also known.

The metal tarnishes in air. Its surface oxide can flake away, exposing fresh metal and allowing oxidation to continue. On burning in oxygen, it forms neodymium(III) oxide:

4 Nd + 3 O_{2} → 2 Nd_{2}O_{3}

Neodymium is electropositive and reacts with water to produce neodymium(III) hydroxide and hydrogen. The reaction is slow in cold water and faster in hot water:

2 Nd + 6 H_{2}O → 2 Nd(OH)_{3} + 3 H_{2}

It also dissolves in dilute sulfuric acid, releasing hydrogen and forming a solution containing hydrated neodymium(III) ions.

2 Nd(s) + 3 H_{2}SO_{4}(aq) → 2 Nd^{3+}(aq) + 3 SO_{4}^{2−}(aq) + 3 H_{2}(g)

In aqueous solution, water molecules bind to neodymium(III) ions. Spectroscopic measurements are consistent with a hydrated ion containing nine directly coordinated water molecules, [Nd(H_{2}O)_{9}]^{3+}.

== Compounds ==
Neodymium most commonly forms compounds in the +3 oxidation state. Its chloride and nitrate are soluble in water, whereas its oxide and hydroxide are poorly soluble. Dissolved neodymium salts can precipitate as the hydroxide at neutral or alkaline pH.

Neodymium salts can appear different colors under different types of illumination.

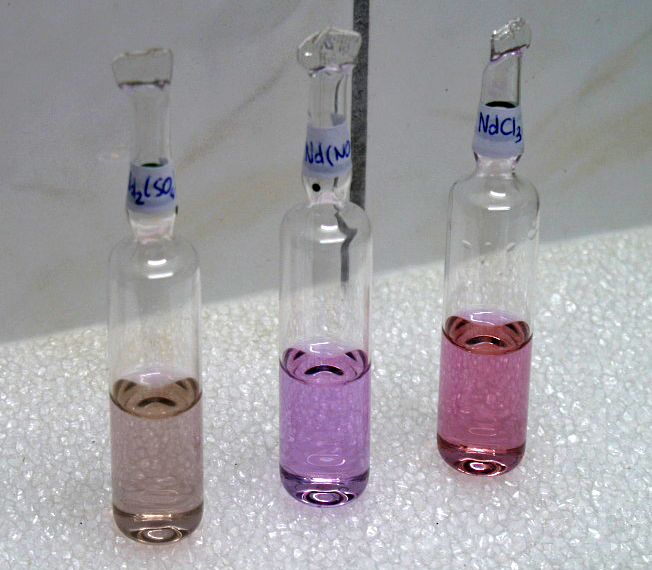
Solutions of neodymium(III) sulfate, nitrate, and chloride (left to right) under fluorescent tube lighting

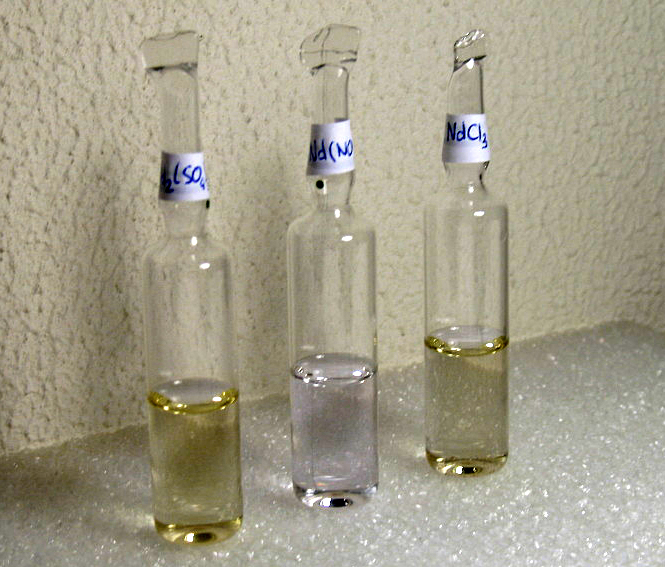
The same solutions under compact fluorescent lighting

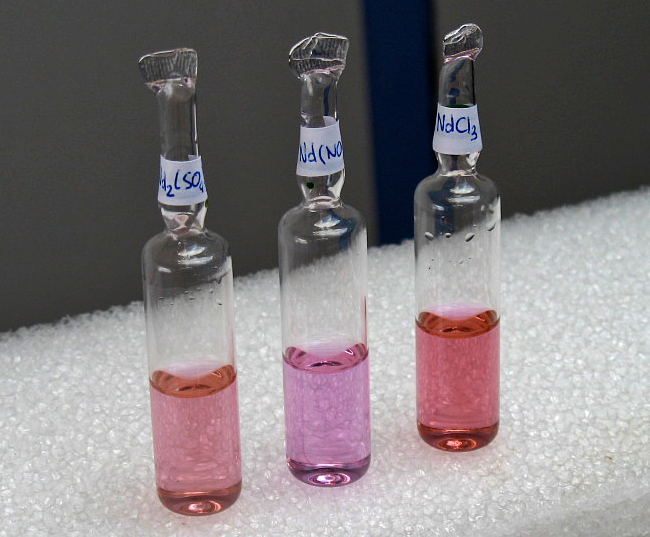
The same solutions in daylight

=== Oxides ===
Neodymium(III) oxide, Nd_{2}O_{3}, also called neodymia, occurs in hexagonal and cubic crystal forms. Both react with atmospheric moisture and carbon dioxide, undergoing hydration and carbonation; these changes occur more rapidly in the cubic samples studied. The oxide can also be prepared by heating neodymium(III) oxalate, which decomposes through stages that depend on the surrounding atmosphere.

Neodymium monoxide, NdO, has also been synthesized at high pressure and temperature. It adopts the rock-salt structure and is metastable. One preparation used a pressure of 5 GPa and a temperature of 1,473 K (1,200 °C). Thin NdO films 45 nm thick have been reported to become ferromagnetic below about 19 K.

=== Chalcogenides ===
Neodymium forms compounds with sulfur, selenium, and tellurium, including the monochalcogenides NdS, NdSe, and NdTe. These are metallic compounds with the rock-salt structure. Neutron diffraction measurements show that all three develop antiferromagnetic order at low temperatures.

Neodymium telluride is stable at high temperatures, with a reported melting point of about 2,025 °C (3,677 °F). Its formation has been investigated as a way of binding neodymium produced in uranium–zirconium nuclear fuel, thereby limiting its availability to react with the fuel cladding.

=== Halides ===
Neodymium reacts with fluorine, chlorine, bromine, and iodine to form the corresponding trihalides: NdF_{3}, NdCl_{3}, NdBr_{3}, and NdI_{3}. These reactions can be represented by the general equation below, where X denotes a halogen:

2 Nd + 3 X_{2} → 2 NdX_{3}

The fluoride and bromide are violet, the chloride is mauve, and the iodide is green.

Neodymium(III) chloride can also be prepared in an anhydrous form by heating neodymium(III) oxide with ammonium chloride. The resulting chloride is sensitive to moisture.

Lower halides include neodymium(II) chloride, NdCl_{2}, and neodymium(II) iodide, NdI_{2}. Neodymium(II) iodide can be prepared by reacting neodymium metal with iodine under controlled conditions. The diiodide acts as a reducing agent: in tetrahydrofuran, it converts several alkyl and aryl halides into the corresponding hydrocarbons.

=== Borides ===
Neodymium forms borides including the tetraboride, NdB_{4}, and hexaboride, NdB_{6}. The tetraboride has a tetragonal structure. Competing magnetic interactions give rise to several low-temperature phases, and its response to an applied magnetic field depends strongly on the field's direction relative to the crystal axes.

Neodymium hexaboride, NdB_{6}, has a cubic structure and becomes antiferromagnetic below a Néel temperature of approximately 8.6 K. Large single crystals of both borides can be grown by the floating-zone method, in which a molten region is moved along a rod of the starting material.

=== Hydroxide and salts ===
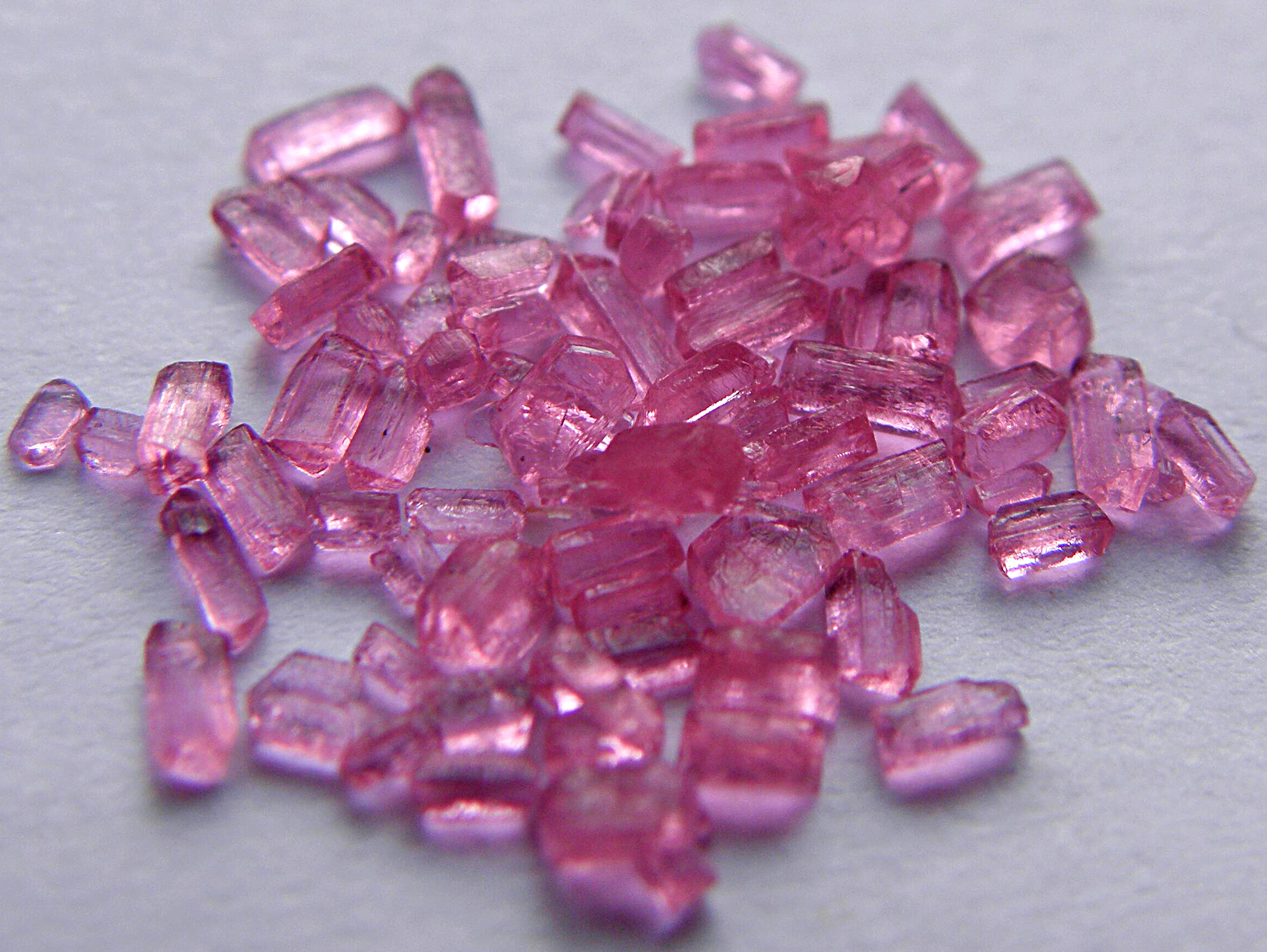
Neodymium(III) sulfate octahydrate

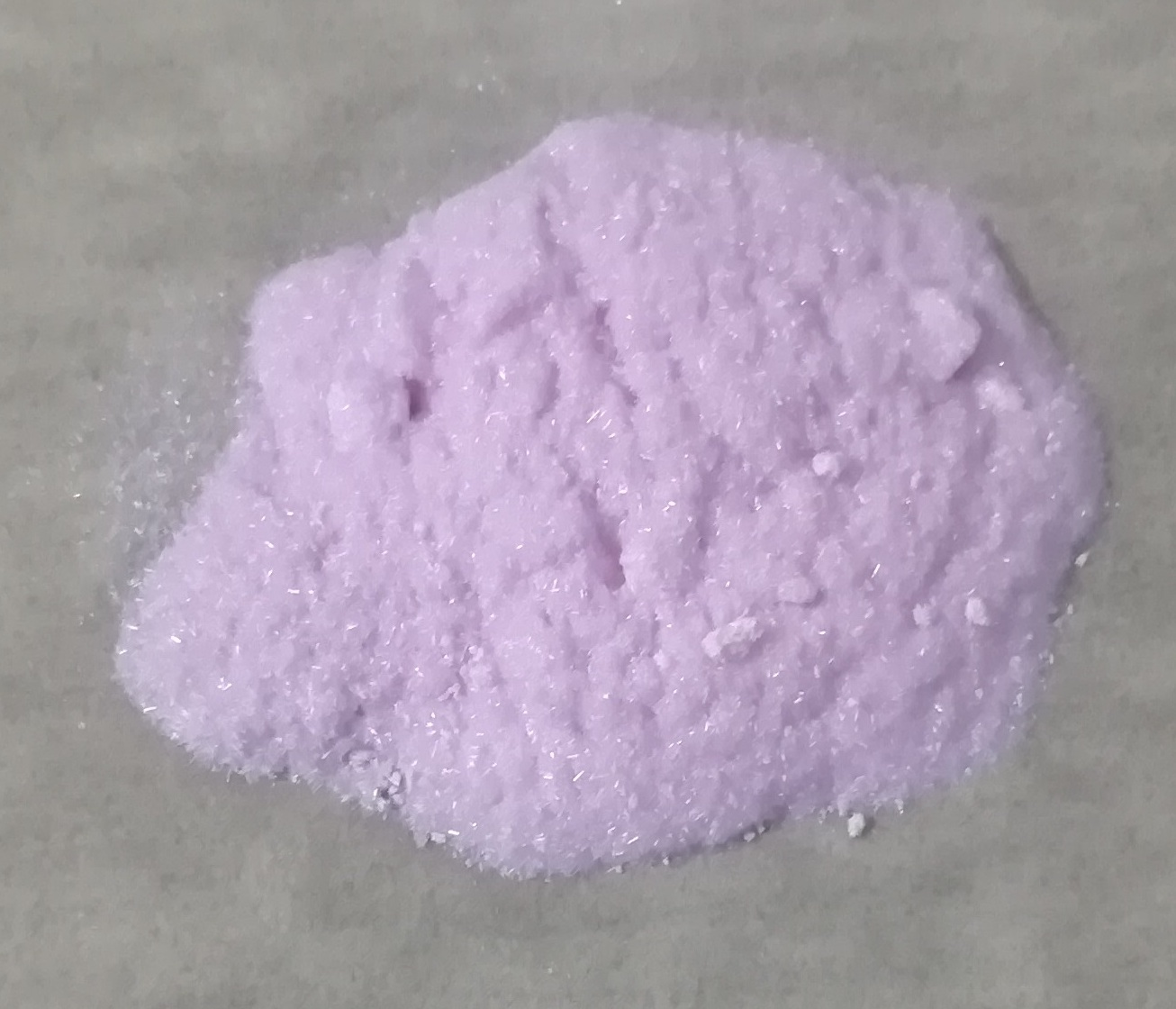
Neodymium(III) acetate

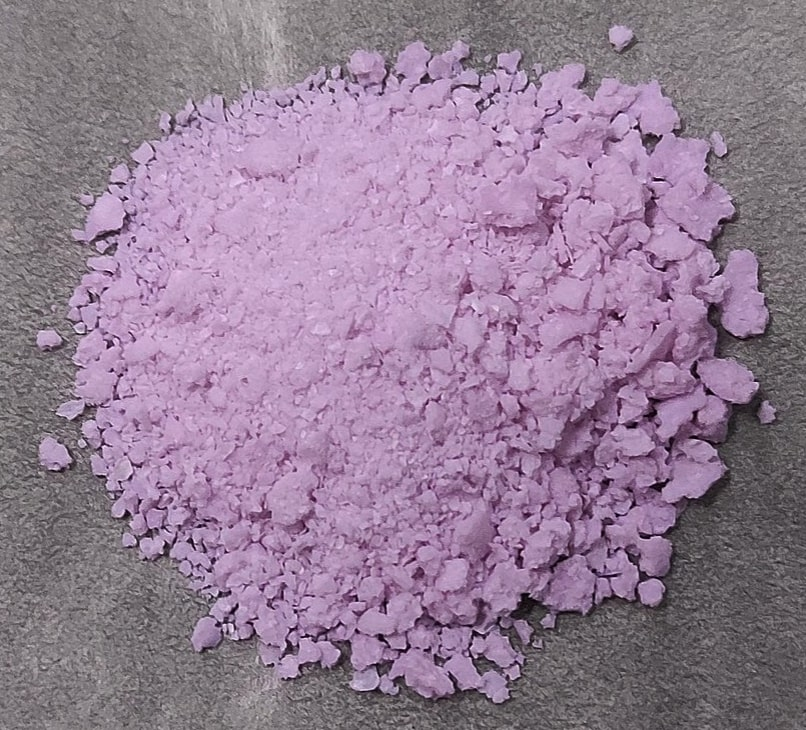
Neodymium(III) hydroxide

Neodymium(III) hydroxide, Nd(OH)_{3}, is sparingly soluble in water but dissolves in hydrochloric acid.

Several neodymium salts form hydrates, whose crystals incorporate water molecules. These include the octahydrates of neodymium(III) carbonate, Nd_{2}(CO_{3})_{3}·8H_{2}O, and neodymium(III) sulfate, Nd_{2}(SO_{4})_{3}·8H_{2}O.

Neodymium(III) acetate, Nd(CH_{3}COO)_{3}, also forms a monohydrate. Heating removes its water of crystallization; further heating decomposes the acetate through intermediate compounds to an oxycarbonate.

=== Other inorganic compounds ===
Neodymium forms hydrides whose structures depend on their hydrogen content. The trihydride, NdH_{3}, has a trigonal structure related to that of tysonite, whereas hydrogen-deficient compositions can have a cubic metal sublattice.

Neodymium nitride, NdN, has been studied as a magnetic semiconductor. Thin films grown by molecular beam epitaxy have shown an optical band gap of about 0.9 eV and ferromagnetic ordering below about 43 K.

Neodymium also forms binary compounds with other pnictogens, including the phosphide NdP, arsenide NdAs, and antimonide NdSb. These have the rock-salt structure and show antiferromagnetic ordering at low temperatures. Its carbides include the tetragonal dicarbide, NdC_{2}, and cubic sesquicarbide, Nd_{2}C_{3}.

=== Organometallic compounds ===
Organoneodymium compounds contain bonds between neodymium and carbon. They include cyclopentadienyl complexes, in which neodymium binds to carbon rings, and compounds with σ-bonded alkyl or aryl groups. Studies of substituted cyclopentadienyl complexes have found that their neodymium–ligand bonding is predominantly electrostatic, with little covalent character.

== Isotopes ==
Isotopes of neodymium (_{60}Nd)
| Main isotopes | | | Decay | |
| Isotope | abundance | half-life (t_{1/2}) | mode | product |
|---|---|---|---|---|
| ^{140}Nd | synth | 3.37 d | β^{+} | ^{140}Pr |
| ^{142}Nd | 27.2% | stable | | |
| ^{143}Nd | 12.2% | stable | | |
| ^{144}Nd | 23.8% | 2.29×10^{15} y | α | ^{140}Ce |
| ^{145}Nd | 8.3% | stable | | |
| ^{146}Nd | 17.2% | stable | | |
| ^{147}Nd | synth | 10.98 d | β^{−} | ^{147}Pm |
| ^{148}Nd | 5.8% | stable | | |
| ^{150}Nd | 5.6% | 9.3×10^{18} y | β^{−}β^{−} | ^{150}Sm |

Standard atomic weight A_{r}°(Nd)
- 144.242±0.003; 144.24±0.01 (abridged)

Natural neodymium contains seven isotopes: ^{142}Nd, ^{143}Nd, ^{144}Nd, ^{145}Nd, ^{146}Nd, ^{148}Nd, and ^{150}Nd. The most abundant is ^{142}Nd, which accounts for approximately 27.2% of natural neodymium. Five of these isotopes have no observed radioactive decay. Of those five, ^{143}Nd, ^{145}Nd, ^{146}Nd, and ^{148}Nd are predicted to undergo extremely slow alpha decay and are therefore described as observationally stable.

The other two natural isotopes are primordial radionuclides, whose long half-lives have allowed them to survive since before the formation of Earth. Neodymium-144 undergoes alpha decay to ^{140}Ce with a half-life of (2.29±0.16)×10^{15} years. Neodymium-150 undergoes double beta decay to ^{150}Sm; the NEMO-3 experiment measured a half-life of approximately 9.3×10^{18} years for decay to the ground state of samarium-150.

The other known radioisotopes have much shorter half-lives. The longest-lived of these is ^{147}Nd, with a half-life of 10.98 days, followed by ^{140}Nd at 3.37 days. Neutron-deficient isotopes generally decay by electron capture or positron emission to praseodymium, whereas neutron-rich isotopes generally undergo beta-minus decay to promethium. Neodymium also has numerous nuclear isomers, in which the nucleus occupies a relatively long-lived excited state. The longest-lived is ^{139m}Nd, with a half-life of 5.5 hours; other examples include ^{135m}Nd at 5.5 minutes and ^{133m1}Nd at approximately 70 seconds.

The alpha decay of ^{147}Sm to ^{143}Nd, with a half-life of approximately 1.07×10^{11} years, forms the basis of samarium–neodymium dating.

Neodymium isotopes are also used as targets for producing other radionuclides. Neutron capture by ^{146}Nd produces ^{147}Nd, which undergoes beta-minus decay to ^{147}Pm. Irradiation of enriched ^{146}Nd targets has been investigated as a source of ^{147}Pm for betavoltaic batteries, which convert energy from beta radiation into electricity. Bombardment of natural neodymium with deuterons has also been used to produce promethium isotopes. Enriched ^{142}Nd targets have been used with fluorine and neon ion beams to produce short-lived thulium and ytterbium isotopes.

Several neodymium isotopes occur among the products of nuclear fission. Measurements of ^{148}Nd in spent nuclear fuel are used to determine burnup, the extent to which the fuel has undergone fission. Measurements of other neodymium isotopes can provide additional estimates and reduce uncertainty.

Neodymium-150 is studied in experiments on double beta decay. Its relatively high decay energy of about 3.37 MeV makes it a candidate for searches for neutrinoless double beta decay, a hypothetical process that would establish that the neutrino is its own antiparticle. Its observed two-neutrino decay, in which two electrons and two antineutrinos are emitted, has been measured for transitions to both the ground state and an excited state of ^{150}Sm. These measurements help test nuclear models used to interpret searches for neutrinoless decay.

== History ==
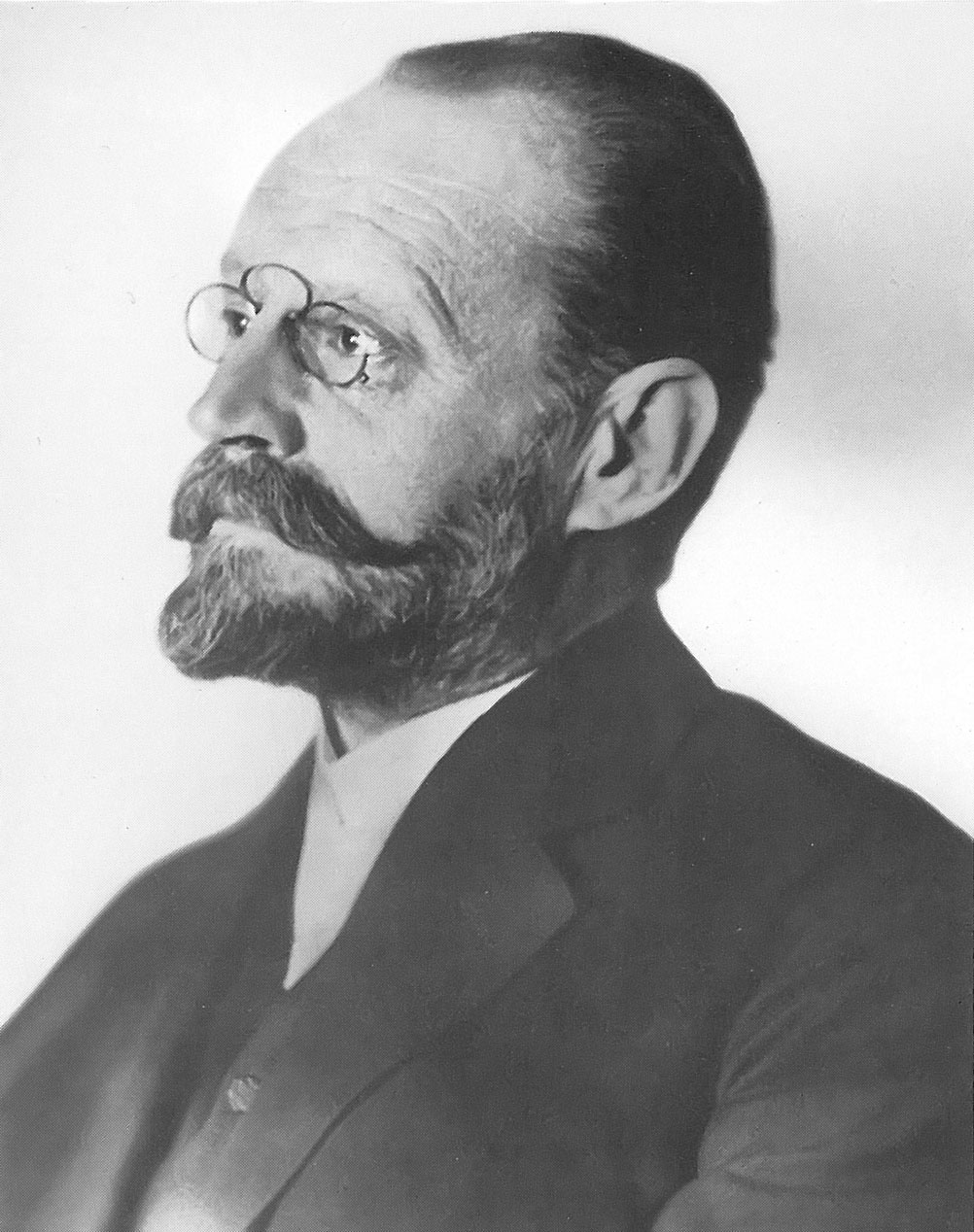
Carl Auer von Welsbach, who discovered neodymium in 1885

The discovery of neodymium followed investigations of cerite, the mineral in which Jöns Jacob Berzelius and Wilhelm Hisinger, and independently Martin Heinrich Klaproth, identified cerium in 1803.

During the late 1830s and early 1840s, Carl Gustaf Mosander's studies of cerium compounds led to the identification of lanthanum and a further component that he named didymium. The name, derived from the Greek for 'twin', referred to didymium's close association with lanthanum. Didymium was initially accepted as an element and appeared in Dmitri Mendeleev's 1869 periodic table. However, its composition was questioned as further samples were studied. In 1882, Bohuslav Brauner reported that didymium obtained from different minerals varied in composition.

In 1885, the Austrian chemist Carl Auer von Welsbach separated didymium into praseodymium and neodymium in Vienna. He used repeated fractional crystallization of double ammonium nitrate salts, exploiting small differences in their solubility. The smaller fraction, which formed green salts, was named praseodymium, while the larger fraction was named neodymium. Spectroscopic analysis distinguished the two components. The name neodymium combines the Greek neos ('new') and didymos ('twin'). Although the element had been identified in its compounds, neodymium metal was not isolated in relatively pure form until 1925.

Separation of the rare-earth elements continued to rely on laborious fractional crystallization methods into the twentieth century, before the development of ion exchange techniques in the 1940s. In 1947, Frank Spedding and his colleagues reported the separation of neodymium and praseodymium using ion-exchange columns. Subsequent improvements at Iowa State College, including the use of EDTA as a complexing agent, led to a pilot plant operating by 1953. These methods were scaled up to produce kilogram quantities of purified rare-earth salts and were adopted by commercial producers, increasing the availability of the separated elements for research and industrial use.

== Occurrence and production ==
=== Occurrence ===
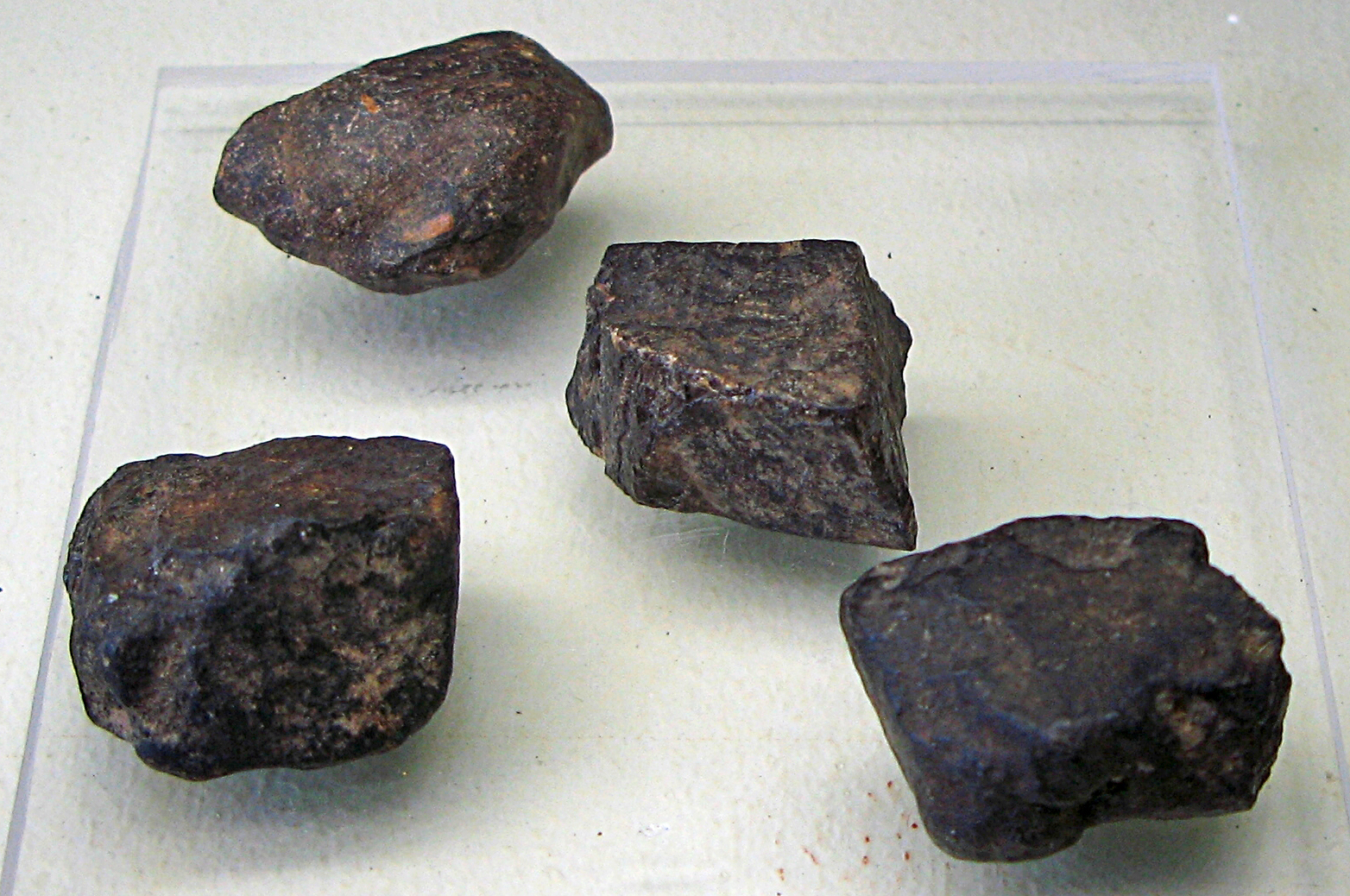
Bastnäsite, an important source of neodymium and other light rare-earth elements

Abundances of elements in the Earth's crust

Neodymium occurs naturally in minerals containing other rare-earth elements. Its estimated abundance in the Earth's crust is about 41 mg/kg, comparable to that of lanthanum. Although rare-earth elements are relatively widespread, deposits in which they are sufficiently concentrated for economic extraction are less common.

Like the other lanthanides, neodymium has a strong affinity for oxygen and occurs in phosphate, carbonate and silicate minerals. The size of the Nd^{3+} ion is similar to those of the neighboring light lanthanides, which allows these elements to occupy the same sites in mineral structures. Consequently, neodymium commonly accompanies lanthanum, cerium and praseodymium.

The principal commercial sources include bastnäsite, a group of rare-earth fluorocarbonates, and monazite, a group of rare-earth phosphates. Both generally contain mixtures of rare-earth elements. Minerals in which neodymium is the dominant rare-earth constituent include monazite-(Nd), (Nd,La,Ce)PO_{4}, and kozoite-(Nd), NdCO_{3}(OH). The latter was first described from cavities and fissures in basalt in Saga Prefecture, Japan, where it forms pale pinkish-purple to white aggregates.

Major light-rare-earth deposits are associated with carbonatites and related igneous and hydrothermal activity. Examples include Mountain Pass in California and Bayan Obo in Inner Mongolia. Weathering can further concentrate rare-earth minerals, as at Mount Weld in Western Australia. Monazite also accumulates in placer deposits, where erosion and sedimentary sorting concentrate dense minerals in river or coastal sands.

Neodymium is also present in meteorites and the solar photosphere. A 2025 compilation estimated its Solar System abundance at approximately 0.88 atoms per million silicon atoms, adopting the abundance measured in CI chondrites.

=== Production ===
==== Ore processing ====
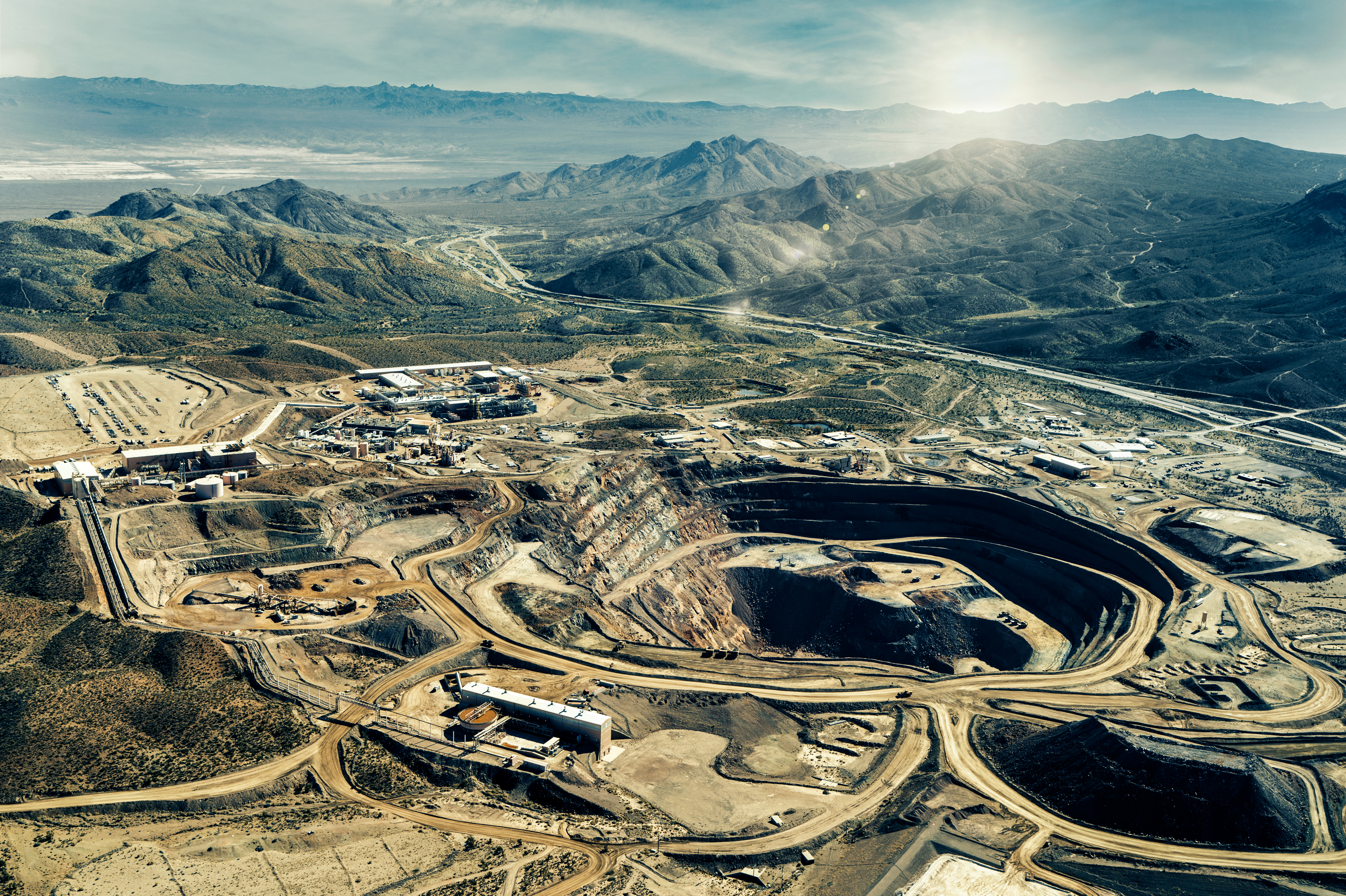
The Mountain Pass mine in California, a major rare-earth mining and processing facility.

Production begins with the concentration of rare-earth-bearing minerals. For hard-rock ores, crushing and grinding liberate mineral grains from the surrounding rock. Froth flotation, gravity separation, magnetic separation and electrostatic separation are used in different combinations according to the ore's mineralogy. These operations exploit differences in surface properties, density, magnetism or electrical conductivity to separate the valuable minerals from gangue. They produce a mineral concentrate containing a mixture of rare-earth elements.

The concentrate is then chemically treated to bring the rare-earth elements into solution. One industrial method is the sulfuric acid bake and leach process: heating the concentrate with concentrated acid converts rare-earth minerals into sulfates, which can subsequently be dissolved by leaching with water. The acid requirement and heating conditions are adapted to the minerals in the feedstock.

Ore composition also affects the treatment of impurities and residues. Monazite commonly contains thorium, whereas bastnäsite generally contains less. Processing separates these radioactive constituents from the rare-earth products and produces residues that require management; the quantities depend on the deposit and processing route.

==== Separation and purification ====
Separating neodymium from the other rare-earth elements is difficult because their trivalent ions have similar chemical properties. Industrial separation principally uses solvent extraction, in which an aqueous solution is contacted with an organic liquid containing an extractant. The elements partition differently between the two liquids, allowing successive extraction and washing stages to enrich particular rare earths. The extracted metals are subsequently transferred back into an aqueous solution in a step known as stripping. Complete separation can require many stages arranged in mixer-settler systems.

Depending on the intended product, a separation plant may recover neodymium individually or produce a mixed praseodymium–neodymium fraction for permanent-magnet manufacture. Ion exchange is also used to obtain smaller quantities of highly purified rare earths. In this process, dissolved ions bind reversibly to charged sites on a solid resin. Differences in their interactions with the resin and the solutions passed through it allow them to be separated.

Following separation, neodymium can be recovered from solution by precipitation as an oxalate. Heating the precipitate converts it into neodymium(III) oxide, Nd_{2}O_{3}, which serves as a starting material for production of the metal.

==== Metal production ====
An industrial route to neodymium metal is electrolysis of its oxide dissolved in a molten mixture of neodymium(III) fluoride and lithium fluoride. Neodymium ions are reduced at the cathode, and the molten metal collects at the bottom of the cell. A graphite anode is consumed during the process, producing carbon monoxide and carbon dioxide. The preparation of the fluoride electrolyte and the electricity consumed during electrolysis contribute to the environmental impacts of metal production.

The metal can also be prepared by reducing anhydrous neodymium halides with calcium. For neodymium(III) fluoride, the reaction produces neodymium metal and calcium fluoride:

2 NdF_{3} + 3 Ca → 2 Nd + 3 CaF_{2}

=== Supply ===
Neodymium is produced and refined alongside other rare-earth elements used in magnets. According to the International Energy Agency, China accounted for 60% of global mined output and 91% of refined output of neodymium, praseodymium, dysprosium and terbium combined in 2024.

Permanent magnets in electric vehicles, wind turbines and industrial motors contribute to demand. In its 2026 assessment, the agency reported that demand for the four magnet rare earths had doubled since 2015 and projected a further increase of approximately one-third by 2030 under the policies in place at the time.

=== Recycling ===
Scrap from magnet manufacture and discarded neodymium–iron–boron magnets provide secondary sources of neodymium. These magnets typically contain approximately 31–32% rare-earth elements by mass, principally neodymium and praseodymium, with some grades also containing dysprosium or terbium. Recovering magnets from discarded products can require dismantling equipment and removing coatings, adhesives and other attached materials.

Recycling routes either recover the rare-earth elements chemically or reuse the magnetic alloy. Hydrometallurgical methods dissolve the material and separate the rare earths from iron and other constituents before recovering rare-earth compounds. Direct recycling instead preserves the alloy for remelting or reprocessing into magnets. The choice of recycling process depends on the alloy composition and on how much the scrap has oxidized or become contaminated.

One direct-recycling method uses hydrogen to break sintered magnets into a demagnetized, hydrogenated powder. The powder can be mechanically separated from components such as hard disk drives and cleaned to reduce contamination from coatings. It can then be blended and resintered into new magnets, remelted, or subjected to further processing. The properties obtainable from the recycled material depend on the feedstock and the treatment used.

== Applications ==
=== Permanent magnets ===
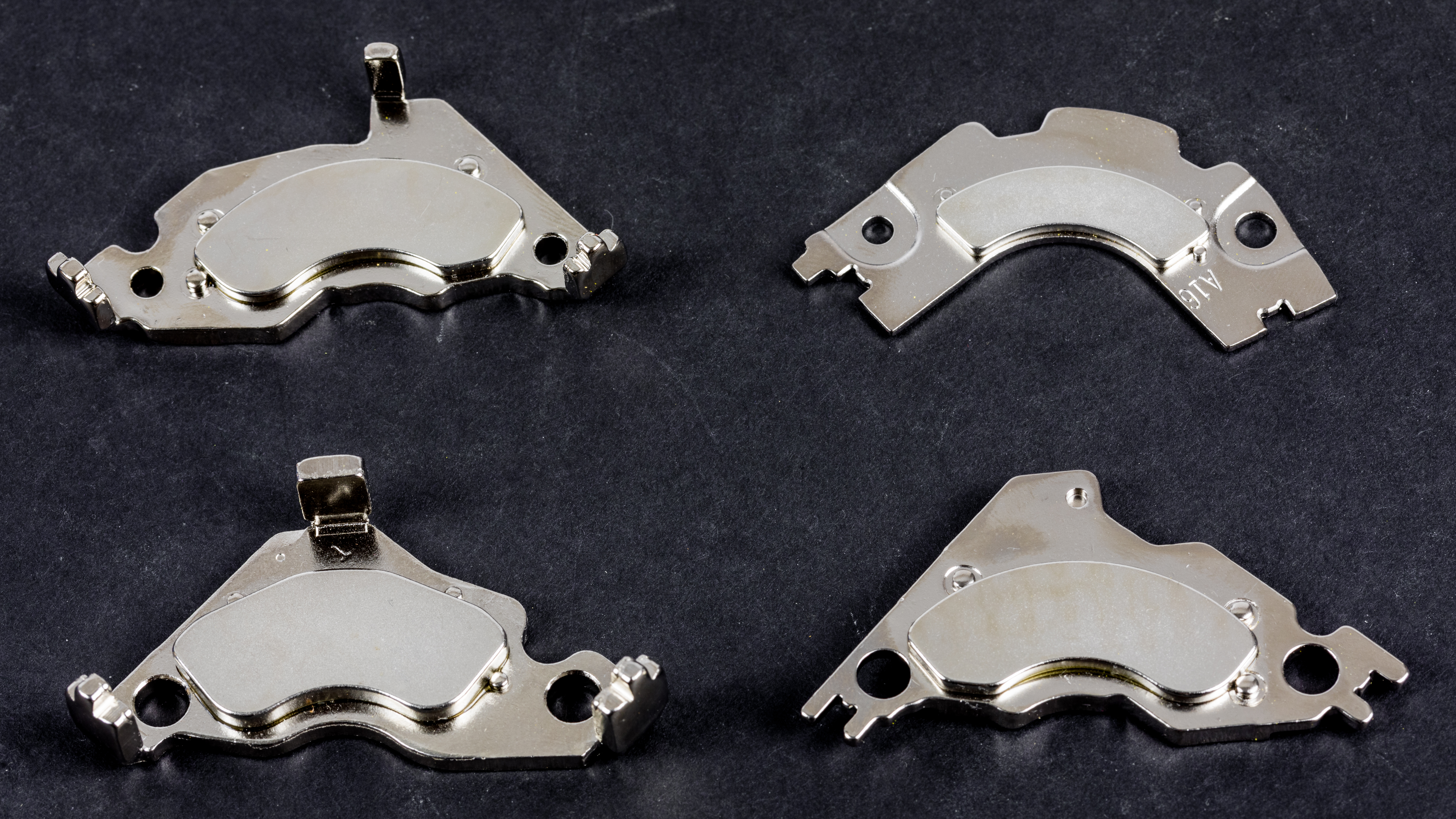
Neodymium magnets and their mounting brackets recovered from hard disk drives

An important application of neodymium is in neodymium–iron–boron (Nd–Fe–B) permanent magnets, whose principal magnetic phase is the intermetallic compound Nd_{2}Fe_{14}B. Described in 1984, they became commercially available that year. Their high maximum energy product, a measure of permanent-magnet performance, allows small, lightweight components to produce strong magnetic fields. Nd–Fe–B is the strongest widely available permanent-magnet material.

The magnetic properties arise from the combination of the large magnetization contributed by iron and the strong magnetocrystalline anisotropy associated with neodymium and the compound's tetragonal structure. This anisotropy favors magnetization along a particular crystal direction. The arrangement of the magnetic grains and the material between them also strongly influences coercivity, the resistance to demagnetization by an opposing field.

Commercial forms include sintered and polymer-bonded magnets. Sintered magnets are made from fine alloy powder, with the particles aligned in a magnetic field and consolidated by pressing and heating. Bonded magnets contain magnetic powder held together by a polymer and can be molded into more complex shapes. They generally have lower magnetic energy products than sintered magnets because the binder reduces the fraction of magnetic material and, in isotropic grades, the magnetic grains are not aligned.

Their performance decreases with increasing temperature, particularly through a reduction in coercivity. Substituting dysprosium or terbium for some of the neodymium improves resistance to demagnetization at elevated temperatures, although dysprosium additions also reduce magnetization. Samarium–cobalt magnets retain advantages for applications requiring higher temperatures, despite their generally higher cost and lower magnetization. Refining the grain structure and modifying grain boundaries can reduce the amount of heavy rare earths required.

Nd–Fe–B magnets are susceptible to corrosion, and sintered magnets are brittle. Protective treatments include metallic and polymer coatings, which limit contact between the magnetic material and the surrounding environment. The effectiveness of the protection depends on the coating's composition, adhesion and continuity.

Their magnetic strength has enabled the miniaturization of devices such as mobile phones, microphones and loudspeakers. Other audio applications include headphones. Neodymium-based magnetic materials have also been investigated for use in magnetic pickups for guitars. They are also used in computer hard disk drives, including the voice-coil actuators that position the read/write heads.

Larger applications include electric motors in industrial equipment, robots and electric vehicles. In permanent-magnet drive motors, the magnets provide the rotor's magnetic field without an electrically powered excitation winding, helping achieve high efficiency and compact construction. Nd–Fe–B magnets are also used in the generators of some wind turbines. Permanent-magnet generators can be coupled to the turbine through a gearbox or used in direct-drive arrangements, in which the turbine drives the generator without a gearbox.

Neodymium magnets have also been used in low-field magnetic resonance imaging systems. A portable brain-imaging prototype used an array of Nd–Fe–B magnets arranged as a Halbach cylinder to generate an 80 mT field. The permanent-magnet assembly maintained its field without electrical power or the cryogenic cooling required by conventional superconducting MRI magnets.

=== Glass and optical filters ===
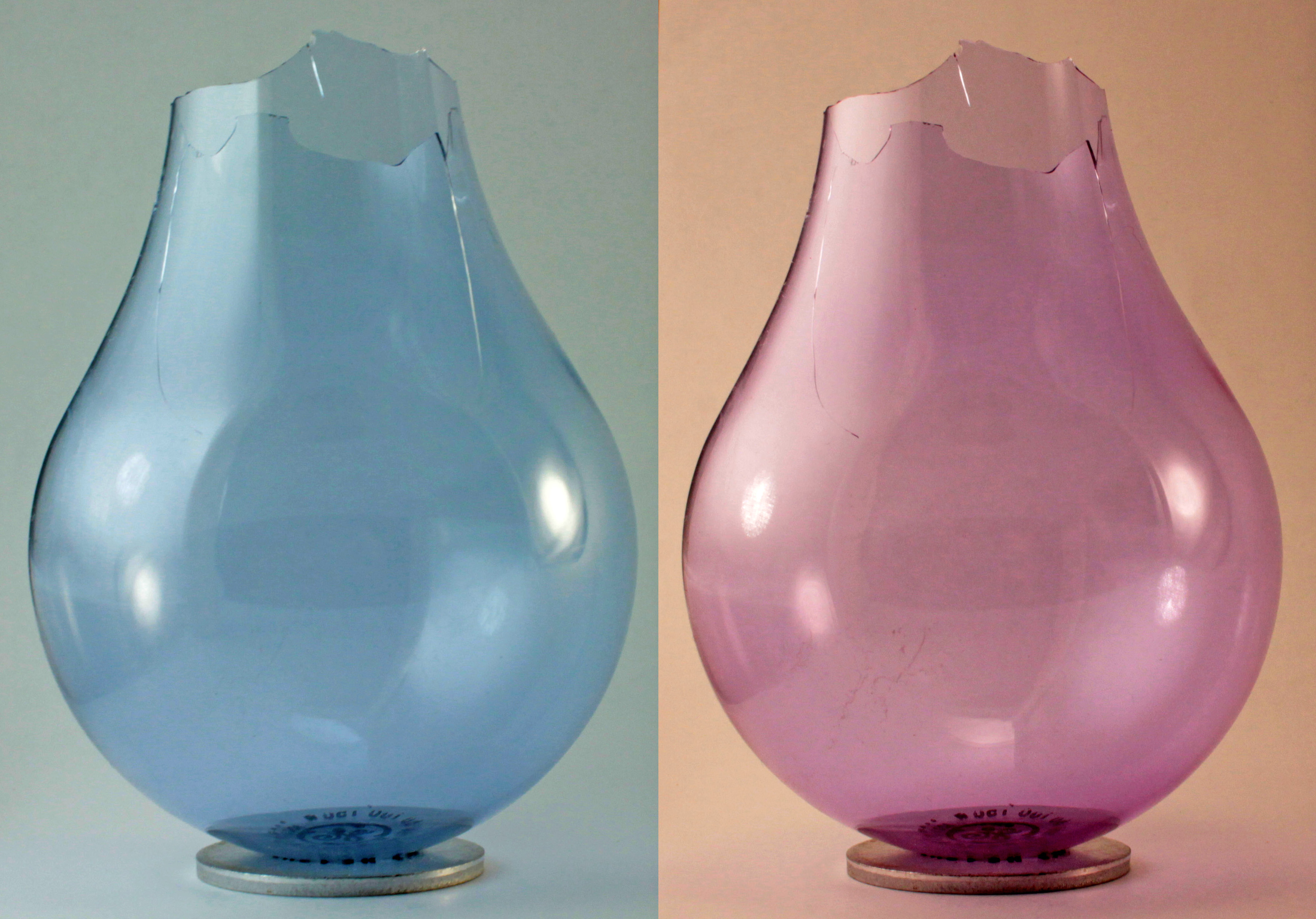
A neodymium glass light bulb, with its base and inner coating removed, under fluorescent light (left) and incandescent light (right).

Neodymium(III) oxide (Nd_{2}O_{3}) is used to color glass, introducing Nd^{3+} ions into the glass during melting. The resulting glass can appear lavender, blue or reddish-purple, depending on the illumination and the thickness of the glass. Its selective absorption filters different wavelengths from each light source, changing the apparent color. Combinations of neodymium and praseodymium have also been investigated for making glass that imitates the color change of alexandrite, appearing greenish in simulated daylight and reddish under incandescent illumination.

The color arises from electronic transitions within the neodymium ions' 4f shell. These electrons are shielded by outer electron shells, so their absorption bands are relatively narrow and less affected by the surrounding glass than those of many transition metal colorants. The absorption is also comparatively weak, requiring higher concentrations to produce strongly colored glass.

Neodymium glass has been used in decorative glassware since the 1920s. At the Moser glassworks, Leo Moser and the German scientist Franz Weidert developed a color-changing glass through a series of experiments; Moser patented the process in 1929. The firm's "Alexandrite" glass was used in cut vessels whose varying thicknesses accentuated the color differences. In the United States, Heisey produced its own neodymium-containing Alexandrite glass from 1930 to 1935, including stemware and decorative objects.

Neodymium can also compensate for the greenish tint caused by iron impurities. This is a form of physical decolorization: its absorption complements that of the iron ions, making the transmitted light more nearly neutral in color. The cost of neodymium restricts this use principally to higher-value products such as lead crystal.

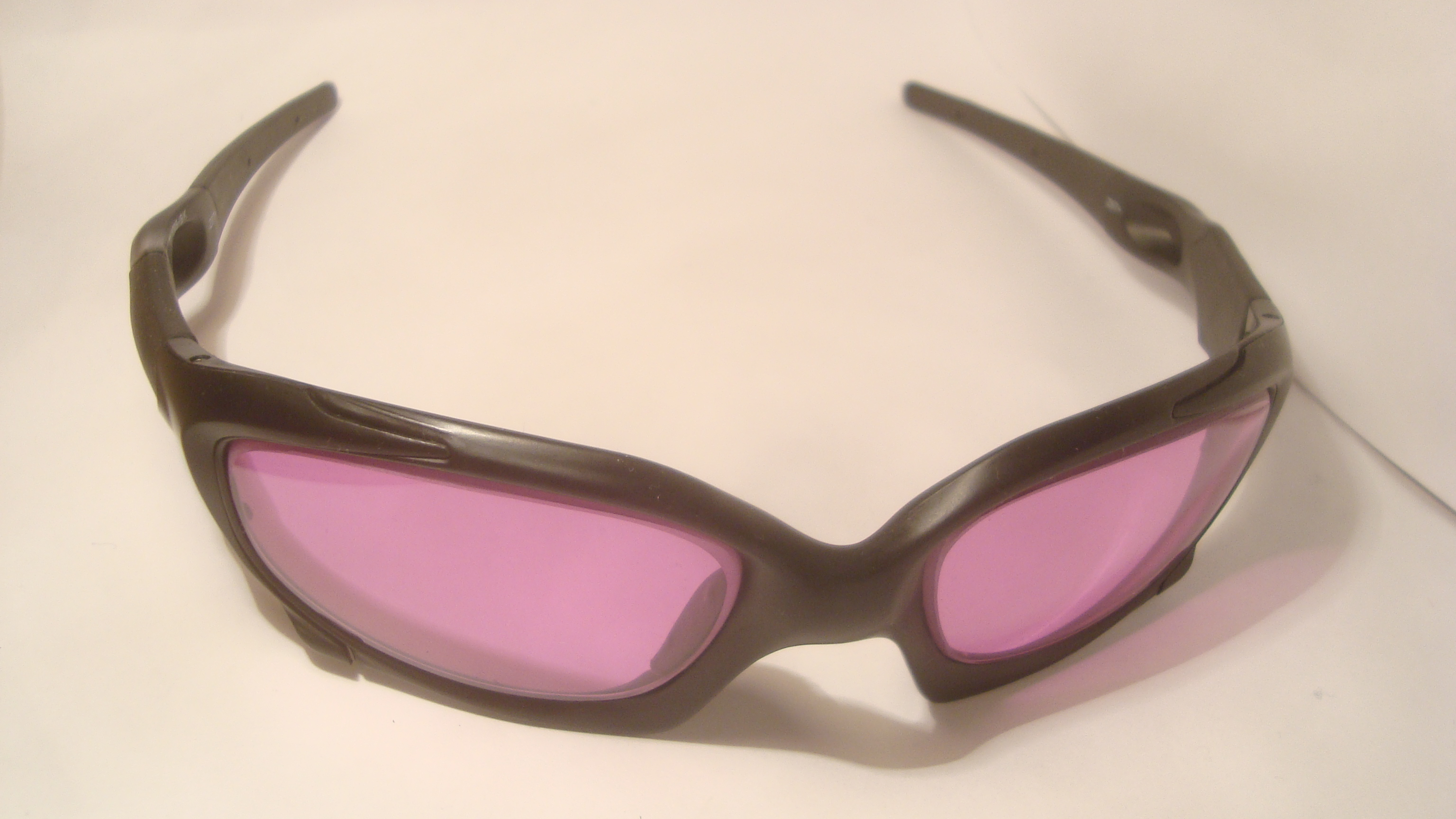
Didymium glasses used to suppress the yellow glare produced during glassworking.

Didymium glass contains both neodymium and praseodymium and is used in protective glasses for glassworkers. It absorbs the intense yellow sodium emission near 589 nm produced when glass is heated in a flame, allowing the worker to see the hot glass more clearly.

Didymium filters are also used in photomicrography to alter color contrast. By absorbing strongly in the yellow-orange region, around 580–590 nm, they can increase the apparent saturation of red, blue and brown features in stained specimens. Neodymium glass is used in astronomical filters intended to reduce the effects of light pollution and improve contrast in observations of the Moon and planets.

Neodymium glass has been used to filter the light from incandescent lamps, absorbing part of the yellow output and increasing the apparent saturation of some illuminated colors. Neodymium-containing phosphor-in-glass materials have also been investigated for LED backlights in liquid-crystal displays. Their absorption separates the green and red emission bands more clearly, widening the range of colors that the display can reproduce.

The distinct absorption bands of didymium glass also provide reference points for calibrating the wavelength scales of spectrophotometers. The United States National Bureau of Standards supplied certified didymium glass filters for this purpose. Comparing the measured positions of their absorption features with reference values allows errors in an instrument's wavelength scale to be identified and corrected.

=== Lasers ===
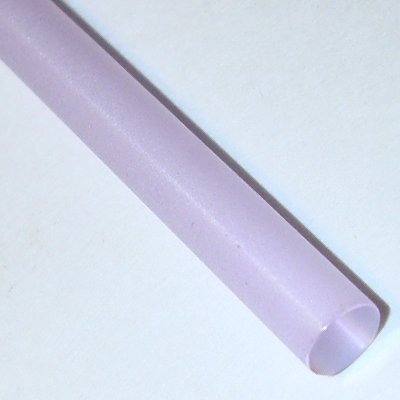
A Nd:YAG laser rod. Neodymium ions provide the laser-active component of the crystal.

Neodymium is used as a dopant in solid-state lasers. Trivalent neodymium ions (Nd^{3+}), incorporated into a transparent crystal or glass, provide the active centers that amplify light. Host materials include yttrium aluminium garnet (Y_{3}Al_{5}O_{12}; Nd:YAG), yttrium lithium fluoride (Nd:YLF), yttrium orthovanadate (Nd:YVO_{4}), and glass. Yttrium aluminium perovskite (Nd:YAP) is another crystalline host.

In Nd:YAG, neodymium ions replace some of the yttrium ions in the crystal lattice. These lasers are optically pumped, using light from a lamp or laser diode to excite the neodymium ions. Nd:YAG commonly emits infrared light at 1064 nm through a four-level laser transition. After emission, the ions rapidly leave the lower laser level, helping to maintain a population inversion: more ions in the upper laser level than in the lower one. Other emission wavelengths are available, depending on the host and the transition used. For example, Nd:YAG and Nd:YAP can also operate on transitions near 1.3 μm.

Neodymium lasers were developed during the early 1960s. Laser operation in neodymium-doped glass was reported in 1961, and continuous operation in neodymium-doped calcium tungstate was reported in 1962. In 1964, J. E. Geusic, H. M. Marcos and L. G. Van Uitert reported laser operation in neodymium-doped garnets, including YAG.

Nd:YAG lasers are used in manufacturing for welding, cutting, marking and trimming components. Their output can be adapted to different tasks by varying the pulse duration, repetition rate and power. They also have medical applications, particularly in ophthalmology, where short pulses are used to disrupt tissue during procedures such as posterior capsulotomy and laser peripheral iridotomy.

Nonlinear optical crystals can convert the infrared output to other wavelengths. Some green laser pointers contain a diode-pumped solid-state laser in which an 808 nm diode pumps Nd:YVO_{4}, producing 1064 nm light. A potassium titanyl phosphate crystal then doubles its frequency, producing green light at 532 nm.

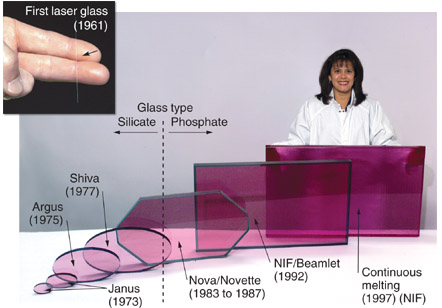
Neodymium-doped glass slabs used in high-energy laser systems for inertial confinement fusion research.

Neodymium-doped glass is particularly useful in large laser systems because it can be manufactured in much larger pieces than crystalline gain media. At the National Ignition Facility in the United States, flashlamps excite neodymium ions in phosphate-glass slabs, which amplify infrared pulses at approximately 1053 nm. The facility's 192-beam system delivers pulses with energies measured in megajoules and peak powers of hundreds of terawatts. Before reaching the fusion target, the light is frequency-tripled to 351 nm in the ultraviolet, which couples more efficiently to the target than the original infrared light.

Neodymium-glass lasers are also used to investigate matter under extreme temperatures and pressures. At the United Kingdom's Atomic Weapons Establishment, the HELEN facility supported plasma-physics research until its retirement in 2009. Its successor, Orion, uses a neodymium-glass laser system to study high-energy-density conditions relevant to nuclear-warhead physics.

=== Catalysis ===
Possible modes of butadiene polymerization, including formation of cis-1,4-polybutadiene. Neodymium-based catalysts are used to obtain high proportions of the cis-1,4 product.

Neodymium compounds are used as catalysts in the industrial production of polybutadiene, a synthetic rubber. These catalysts produce polybutadiene with a high proportion of cis-1,4 units. Polybutadiene with a high proportion of these units is used in tire manufacture because of its resistance to abrasion and low heat build-up during repeated deformation.

Common catalyst systems combine a neodymium carboxylate with organoaluminium compounds and a halogen source. Neodymium complexes have also been investigated as catalysts for producing other polymers, including polyisoprene, polystyrene, and polycaprolactone.

=== Geochemistry ===
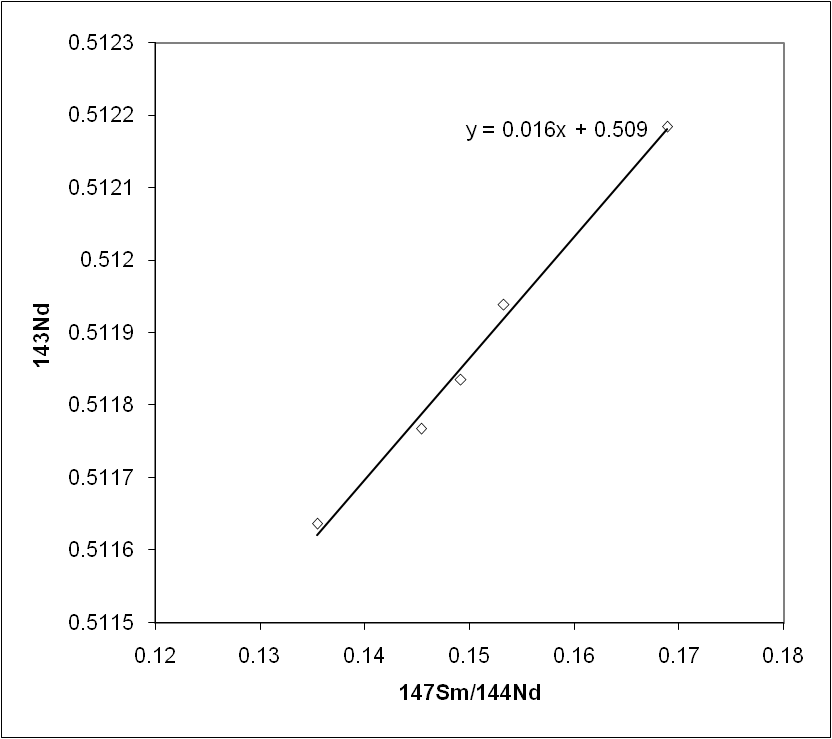
An Sm–Nd isochron for samples from the Great Dyke, Zimbabwe. The slope of an isochron can be used to determine the age of a rock system.

Neodymium isotope ratios are used to determine the ages and origins of rocks and meteorites. Samarium–neodymium dating uses the radioactive decay of ^{147}Sm to ^{143}Nd; measurements of samarium and neodymium isotope ratios provide information about the time elapsed since minerals formed. Variations in the ^{143}Nd/^{144}Nd ratio are also used to investigate the sources of magma and the evolution of Earth's crust and mantle.

In oceanography, neodymium isotope ratios help trace the movement and mixing of water masses. Isotopic records preserved in marine sediments are used to reconstruct changes in past ocean circulation. These records reflect differences in the isotopic composition of neodymium supplied to the ocean and its subsequent transport by currents. Interpretation must also account for exchanges of neodymium between seawater, suspended particles, and seafloor sediments, which can alter the isotopic signal independently of changes in circulation.

=== Other applications ===
- Neodymium is a constituent of mischmetal, a mixture of rare-earth metals whose traditional composition contains about 18% neodymium.
- Neodymium metal has been investigated as a regenerator material in cryocoolers because of its high heat capacity at low temperatures. In this application, small spheres of the metal form a matrix that stores and releases heat during the refrigeration cycle. Neodymium regenerators have been tested in Gifford–McMahon cryocoolers operating near 4 K (−269 °C).
- Neodymium acetate has been investigated as a contrast stain for biological specimens in transmission electron microscopy, as an alternative to uranyl acetate. It produced comparable contrast in several tested tissue-staining applications, although the relative contrast of individual structures differed between the two stains.
- Neodymium salts are used to color enamels. Neodymium oxide has also been studied as a colorant in porcelain, producing colors that vary with the illumination.

== Biological role and hazards ==
=== Biological role ===
Neodymium can serve as a metal cofactor in bacterial methanol dehydrogenase, an enzyme involved in the metabolism of methanol. The methane-oxidizing bacterium Methylacidiphilum fumariolicum SolV, isolated from an acidic volcanic mudpot in Italy, requires a lanthanide for growth. Neodymium can fulfill this requirement, as can lanthanum, cerium, and praseodymium.

The effects of neodymium on plants have been investigated experimentally. In oilseed rape seedlings grown in a calcium-deficient nutrient solution, treatment with neodymium nitrate alleviated symptoms of calcium deficiency and reduced measures of cell-membrane damage. Rare-earth mixtures have been used as fertilizers, particularly in China. Their effects depend on the dose and growing conditions: low concentrations can stimulate growth, while higher concentrations can inhibit growth or cause cellular damage.

=== Hazards ===
Neodymium (powder)
Hazards
- GHS labelling
| Pictograms | (GHS02: Flammable) (GHS07: Exclamation mark) |
| Signal word | Danger |
| Hazard statements | H228, H251, H315, H319 |
| Precautionary statements | P210, P235, P240, P241, P302+P352, P305+P351+P338 |
| NFPA 704 (fire diamond) | 2 3 2 W |

Neodymium (solid ingot)
Hazards
- GHS labelling
| Pictograms | (GHS07: Exclamation mark) |
| Signal word | Warning |
| Hazard statements | H315, H319, H335 |
| Precautionary statements | P261, P305+P351+P338 |
| NFPA 704 (fire diamond) | 0 0 0 |

Finely divided neodymium metal is flammable and can undergo self-heating sufficient to cause ignition. Neodymium powder can also irritate the skin and eyes.

Occupational exposure to dusts containing mixtures of rare-earth elements, including neodymium, has been associated with pneumoconiosis and pulmonary fibrosis. These reports do not establish the contribution of neodymium independently of other components of the dust. Early clinical experiments found that intravenously administered neodymium salts prolonged blood clotting, but investigation of their use as anticoagulants was discontinued following adverse reactions.

Corrosion and potential cytotoxicity are considerations in the use of neodymium–iron–boron magnets in medical devices. The magnetic core can be enclosed in a biocompatible coating, such as titanium, parylene, or gold, to isolate it from surrounding tissues and reduce corrosion.

Neodymium magnets also present mechanical hazards. Large magnets can cause crushing injuries when body parts become trapped between two magnets or between a magnet and a magnetic metal surface. Colliding magnets can chip or shatter, producing fragments that can injure the eyes. Their magnetic fields can interfere with cardiac pacemakers and implantable cardioverter-defibrillators when brought close to the devices.

Swallowed magnets can attract one another, or another magnetic object, across the walls of the gastrointestinal tract, trapping tissue and causing intestinal perforation, obstruction, or other potentially fatal injuries. Reports of injuries requiring surgery led to recalls of magnetic products, including Buckyballs and Buckycubes in the United States in 2014.

== Bibliography ==
- Greenwood, N. N.; Earnshaw, A. (1997). Chemistry of the Elements (2nd ed.). Butterworth-Heinemann. ISBN 978-0-7506-3365-9.
- Cotton, F. Albert; Wilkinson, Geoffrey; Murillo, Carlos A.; Bochmann, Manfred (1999). Advanced Inorganic Chemistry (6th ed.). John Wiley & Sons. ISBN 978-0-471-19957-1.
