= Neodymium(III) carbonate =

Names
- IUPAC name neodymium(3+);tricarbonate
- Other names neodymium(III) carbonate

Identifiers
| CAS Number | 38245-38-4 |
| 3D model (JSmol) | Interactive image |
| ChemSpider | 188213 |
| ECHA InfoCard | 100.025.072 |
| EC Number | 628-324-3 |
| PubChem CID | 217202 |
| CompTox Dashboard (EPA) | DTXSID20890602 |
- InChI: InChI=1S/3CH2O3.2Nd.H2O/c3*2-1(3)4;;;/h3*(H2,2,3,4);;;1H2/q;;;2*+3;/p-6 Key: CZXBEKQIOBCHSG-UHFFFAOYSA-H
- SMILES: C(=O)([O-])[O-].C(=O)([O-])[O-].C(=O)([O-])[O-].O.[Nd+3].[Nd+3]

Properties
| Chemical formula | Nd_{2}(CO_{3})_{3} |
| Molar mass | 468.53 |

Hazards
- GHS labelling
| Pictograms | (GHS07: Exclamation mark) |
| Signal word | Warning |
| Hazard statements | H315, H319, H335 |
| Precautionary statements | P261, P264, P271, P280, P302+P352, P304+P340, P305+P351+P338, P321, P362+P364, P403+P233, P405, P501 |

Related compounds
| Other anions | neodymium(III) oxide, neodymium(III) hydroxide |
| Other cations | praseodymium(III) carbonate samarium(III) carbonate |
- Except where otherwise noted, data are given for materials in their standard state (at 25 °C [77 °F], 100 kPa). Infobox references

Neodymium(III) carbonate is an inorganic compound, a salt, where neodymium is in the +3 oxidation state and the carbonate ion has charge −2. It has a chemical formula of Nd_{2}(CO_{3})_{3}. The anhydrous form is purple-red, while the octahydrate is a pink solid. Both of these salts are insoluble in water.

== Preparation ==
Neodymium(III) carbonate can be created by the reaction between neodymium(III) hydroxide and carbon dioxide:

2Nd(OH)_{3} + 3CO_{2} → Nd_{2}(CO_{3})_{3} + 3H_{2}O

Neodymium(III) carbonate can also be created by passing carbon dioxide under pressure through a solution of neodymium(III) chloride containing aniline:

2NdCl_{3} + 3CO_{2} + 6C_{6}H_{2}NH_{2} + H_{2}O → Nd_{2}(CO_{3})_{3} + 6C_6H_5NH_2·HCl

It can also be obtained from the hydrolysis of neodymium(III) chloroacetate:

2Nd(C_{2}Cl_{3}O_{2})_{3} + 3H_{2}O → Nd_{2}(CO_{3})_{3} + 6CHCl_{3} + 3CO_{2}

Another way to obtain neodymium(III) carbonate is by reacting neodymium(III) chloride with ammonium bicarbonate in water.

== Properties ==
=== Chemical properties ===
Neodymium(III) carbonate dissolves in acids and releases carbon dioxide:

Nd_{2}(CO_{3})_{3} + 6H^{+} → 2Nd^{3+} + 3H_{2}O + 3CO_{2}↑

Neodymium(III) carbonate can react with an acid to produce many neodymium salts. For example, to create neodymium acetate with neodymium(III) carbonate:

6CH_{3}COOH + 2Nd_{2}(CO_{3})_{3} → 2Nd(CH_{3}COO)_{3} + 3H_{2}O + 3CO_{2}

Neodymium(III) carbonate can form complexes with ammonium carbonate, sodium carbonate and potassium carbonate and many other salts, which explains their greater solubility in aqueous solutions than in distilled water. It can easily be converted into other neodymium compounds, such as neodymium(III) oxide when heated. It can also form compounds with hydrazine, such as Nd_{2}(CO_{3})_{3}·12N_{2}H_{4}·4H_{2}O which is a transparaent crystal that is slightly soluble in water but insoluble in benzene, d_{20°C} = 1.96 g/cm^{3}.

=== Physical properties ===
Neodymium(III) carbonate forms crystals and has a crystalline hydrate composition of Nd_{2}(CO_{3})_{3}·nH_{2}O, where n = 2.5 and 8. It does not dissolve in water.

=== Applications ===
Neodymium carbonate can be used for lasers, glass coloring and tinting, and dielectrics.

== See also ==
- Neodymium
- Carbonate
- Lanthanide
