= Neodymium chloride =

Neodymium chloride may refer to:

- Neodymium(II) chloride (neodymium dichloride), NdCl_{2}
- Neodymium(III) chloride (neodymium trichloride), NdCl_{3}
- Neodymium(III) chloride hexahydrate, H_{12}Cl_{3}NdO_{6}
