= Low-field magnetic resonance imaging =

Low-Field MRI

Low-field magnetic resonance imaging (LFMRI) is a form of medical imaging that uses a system of magnets with field strengths of approximately 0.25 to 1 Tesla (T) to generate detailed images of tissue structures. Traditional clinical MRI systems usually operate at a range of 1.5 to 3 T or higher, since the signal-to-noise ratio (SNR), a key metric of image quality, is roughly proportional to magnetic field strength. However, advances in technology have enabled the production of clinically useful images at significantly lower field strengths.

== Background ==
Unlike high-field MRI systems that require cryogenic cooling, extensive radio frequency (RF) shielding, and heavy infrastructure, low-field MRI scanners can be built using permanent or resistive magnets, reducing cost, complexity, and power requirements. These systems are often smaller, lighter, and more portable, making them suitable for point-of-care imaging, emergency or bedside use, and deployment in resource-limited or remote environments. LFMRI therefore has many global health applications, especially in low- and middle-income countries (LMICs), where conventional MRI is often unavailable due to its expense and logistical demands.

Traditional MRI scanners were developed in the late 1970s, and these first models used resistive electromagnets below 3 T. However, in the 1980s, as the technology developed, the resistive magnets were replaced with superconductor magnets due to the homogeneity of the magnetic fields and the high field strengths, which allowed for higher image quality. However, since 2018, several LFMRIs have been approved by the FDA for use in clinical settings. These scanners have been used in emergency departments, for neonatal imaging, and for portable diagnostic settings. Overall, LFMRI has the potential to expand the accessibility of MRI images and high-quality diagnostic healthcare across the globe.

== Technical principles of traditional MRI ==
MRI is based on the behavior of hydrogen nuclei in strong external magnetic fields. The applied magnetic field aligns a portion of the hydrogen protons in the body, creating a net magnetization that can be measured to create the image.

=== Gradients and slice selection ===
MRI relies on two key magnetic field components: the strong static field B_{0} and the gradient fields that vary linearly in space. The B_{0} field, produced by the main magnet, aligns hydrogen protons and sets a uniform Larmor frequency throughout the scanner. To localize signals and form images, MRI systems apply gradient fields along the x, y, and z axes, slightly altering the magnetic field strength in different regions of the body. Because the Larmor frequency depends on magnetic field strength, these gradients cause proton precession frequencies to vary with position. Slice selection uses this principle by applying an RF pulse simultaneously with a gradient field (along the z axis or along the body head to toe), so that only spins whose Larmor frequency falls within the narrow bandwidth of the RF pulse are excited. By choosing the gradient orientation and RF bandwidth, the system can excite a single slice of tissue at a specific z-axis location, enabling spatially resolved imaging in three dimensions.

The Larmor frequency can be described by the equation ω_{0} = γB_{0}, where γ is the gyromagnetic ratio specific to hydrogen protons, and B_{0}. This means that the Larmor Frequency increases linearly with magnetic field strength. High-field MRI systems therefore, operate at comparatively high radio frequency (RF) ranges, which enhances the strength of the detectable signal.

=== Image generation ===
The RF pulse tips the protons in the specific slice into alignment with the pulse (away from the B field). Once the RF pulse is turned off, the protons begin to "relax" back toward equilibrium. The recovery of magnetization along the direction of B_{0} is called longitudinal relaxation, characterized by the T_{1} relaxation time. The changing magnetic flux induces voltages in receiver coils, allowing the MRI system to detect the returning signal.

In addition to T_{1} recovery, protons also undergo transverse dephasing, described by the T_{2} relaxation time. After excitation, the spins precess in unison in the transverse plane, generating a strong detectable signal. However, interactions between neighboring spins cause them to spin out of sync over time, leading to a decay of the transverse magnetization. This process is represented by the T_{2} relaxation constant, which is similarly picked up by receiver coils.

=== Image reconstruction ===
Once relaxation signals are measured by the receiver coils, the MRI system must convert them into an image. The signal data are first encoded in k-space, a frequency–spatial domain that represents how the signal varies with the applied gradient fields. Each z-slice determined by RF slice selection has its own k-space data, allowing for spatially localized information for the image. After sufficient data are acquired, mathematical operations, primarily the Fourier transform, are used to convert the k-space data into a spatial image. The resulting image reflects how T_{1}, T_{2}, and proton density vary across tissues, enabling detailed visualization of anatomical and physiological structures.

=== Equipment specifications of traditional MRI ===
Traditional MRI systems rely on superconducting magnets, which provide highly uniform and stable magnetic fields. These magnets are cooled with liquid helium to maintain superconductivity, enabling systems to operate with minimal resistive losses. However, the need for cryogenic cooling, RF shielding, and extensive site preparation makes these scanners large, expensive, and stationary. Despite the logistical demands, superconducting magnets remain the standard in clinical imaging due to the high field strengths and image quality they enable.

== LFMRI system design and components ==
=== Magnet system ===
At the center of an LFMRI scanner is a magnet that establishes a static magnetic field B_{0}. LFMRI systems use either permanent magnets or resistive electromagnets. High-strength NdFeB permanent magnets are most commonly used because of their strength and stability.

=== Gradient coils and amplifiers ===
Gradient coils in LFMRI encode the MR signal, but they are designed to operate efficiently at lower Larmor frequencies and in systems with less strict magnetic shielding. Since LFMRI systems are small and often have open geometry, superconducting RF coils that are designed for use at high or low temperatures are used to minimize resistance and thermal noise while improving SNR.

=== RF transmission and receive chain ===
The RF subsystem is a critical component of LFMRI since SNR is heavily influenced by coil design at low B_{o}. Modern LFMRI systems use high-efficiency RF coils that have specific architectures that enhance B_{1} uniformity and reduce coil resistance.

=== Data acquisition and reconstruction hardware ===
Data is acquired in LFMRI systems via digital receivers that are capable of sampling at lower bandwidths and capturing low-SNR signals without phase drift. MRI Image reconstruction pipelines often use advanced computational methods, and for portable systems such as the Hyperfine Swoop, machine learning assisted reconstruction is used to produce clinically useful images from raw data.

=== System housing ===
One of the defining features of an LFMRI machine is its smaller, portable design. Since permanent magnets do not require the complex cooling systems that high-field MRI machines need, system housing can be made substantially smaller. Additionally, the fringe field strength of these magnets is much lower, meaning that little to no RF shielding is required. This means that LFMRI systems are able to be placed in open areas and can be made portable.

=== Key differences from high-field MRI ===
LFMRI differs from conventional high-field MRI systems in several ways. The most important distinctions stem from the fact that the magnetic field strength influences key physical behavior within the system, including proton alignment, precession frequency, and signal noise. One of the most central distinctions is the reduction in signal amplitude at lower magnetic fields. Since SNR increases roughly linearly with the magnitude of B_{0}, high-field systems produce substantially higher signals compared to low-field systems. However, modern developments, including improved receive-coil engineering and optimized pulse sequences, have been able to improve SNR at lower fields. Nevertheless, this inherent difference remains one of the defining distinctions between the two modalities.

Another key difference lies in the radio frequency (RF) of the system. Given that the Larmor frequency of an MRI system is dictated by ω_{0}=γB_{0}, it scales linearly with magnetic field strength. This means that LFMRI systems operate at lower frequency ranges compared to standard MRI. Using lower frequencies influences the behavior of both the transmit and receive RF systems. This means that the LFMRI systems can utilize different coil configurations, which are less susceptible to dielectric loading and B_{1} inhomogeneity effects. These issues are more prevalent at higher frequencies because tissue permittivity interacts more strongly at shorter RF wavelengths. The specific absorption rate (SAR), which scales approximately with the square of RF frequency, is also substantially lower in LFMRI, resulting in reduced RF heating compared to high-field systems.

Additionally, the physical setup of LFMRI differs from standard MRI machines. Traditional scanners rely on superconducting magnets that require liquid helium cooling and extensive site preparation. LFMRI systems, by contrast, are often built using permanent magnets or resistive electromagnets that operate at room temperature. High field MRIs are optimized for maximal field uniformity and image quality; LFMRI systems typically prioritize stability and manufacturability.

Finally, there are differences in the relaxation behavior between the two systems that impact contrast mechanisms. T_{1} relaxation times decrease significantly at low magnetic fields, which reduces the T_{1}-weighted contrast. T_{2} relaxation time tends to increase, making T_{2}^{*} effects less pronounced due to reduced susceptibility-induced dephasing. As a result, LFMRI often requires different sequence parameters to maintain effective image contrast.

=== Benefits and advantages of LFMRI ===
One of the most significant benefits of LFMRI is the lowered cost and infrastructure requirements. Since low-field systems rely on permanent magnets rather than the large, superconducting coils of high-field systems, they eliminate the need for much of the complex, specialized infrastructure. This substantially reduces the installation and maintenance costs, which allows them to be used in settings where traditional MRI machines would be too expensive and inaccessible. Additionally, LFMRI has lower energy demands and does not need cryogen handling, which means it can be used in locations with limited electrical access.

LFMRIs are also much more portable. Many low-field scanners are lightweight enough to be wheeled to a patient's bedside or transported between clinical sites. This mobility allows for MRI to be used in places where conventional scanners cannot be installed, including ICU's emergency rooms, or rural clinics. Having technology that can move to patients offers the possibility of earlier intervention as well as improved patient outcomes.

Many of the inherent safety risks associated with traditional MRI machines are due to the sheer strength of the magnetic field they produce. Therefore, LFMRI systems provide important safety advantages. The weaker field produces minimal projectile risk and can also reduce the possibility of interaction with metallic implants and electronics, allowing for more patients to be scanned. As previously mentioned, LFMRI works with lower RF frequencies and produces a lower SAR, which decreases the risk of RF heating and limits the potential risk of thermal burns to patients. LFMRI also produces different artifact behavior. Since susceptibility-induced distortions and metal artifacts increase with field strength, low field scanners often produce cleaner images in the tissue near metal implants or air-tissue interfaces.

Finally, the use of LFMRI has substantial implications for global health. Many LMICs lack access to traditional MRI scanners due to their cost and maintenance requirements. LFMRI systems offer an imaging option that can be used in rural hospitals, disaster zones, and mobile clinics. Since the training burden is lower and the systems require less maintenance, LFMRI offers the chance to improve diagnostic capabilities in settings that have once been out of reach.

== Why does LFMRI still work? ==
Although LFMRI operated with a substantially reduced SNR, recent innovations have enabled these machines to still be useful in diagnostic imaging even at magnetic fields lower than traditional scanners. Two of the biggest issues that LFMRI initially faced were the lower net magnetization and altered relaxation behavior of the protons; technological advances have allowed machines to overcome this.

One of the major advancements that has allowed the development of LFMRI is the development of high-performance RF coils and low-noise receive electronics. Recent work in coil development has focused on "coupled stacked-up volume" RF coils, which use multilayer winding patterns and inductive coupling to optimize current distributions and maximize B_{1} sensitivity while simultaneously minimizing coil resistance. These coils concentrate the magnetic field in the imaging region, and suppress noise contributions that usually limit low-field performance. When used in tandem with a low-noise preamplifier and digitally controlled tuning methods, these systems significantly improve receiving sensitivity and SNR, which compensates for the reduced net magnetization.

Another important advancement is the creation of pulse sequences that have been tailored specifically for the relaxation behavior found in low-field systems. Since T_{1} becomes shorter and T_{2}/T_{2}^{*} become longer in these systems, traditional sequences do not produce adequate imaging. Researchers have developed optimized ultrashort echo-time (UTE) methods and image distortion correction algorithms that capture the signal before significant decay and make use of the extended T_{2} window that occurs at lower B_{0}.

Significant progress has also been made in the field of magnet engineering, allowing the production of stronger, more homogeneous magnets without increasing the size or cost. LFMRI relies on permanent magnets, which are usually high-strength Neodymium-iron-boron (NbFeB) permanent magnets that range from about 1.2 to 1.425 T in remanence. Remanence (B_{r}) is described as the magnetic flux density after a material has been magnetized, with a stronger B_{r} indicating a stronger magnetic field both in and around the magnet. For MRI applications, recent improvements have shown how these magnets can be shaped and segmented to optimize field uniformity. Additionally, fine-tuning of homogeneity is done through the use of shim pieces, which are small, movable magnetic pieces that correct spatial variations in B_{0}. These improvements have enabled LFMRI systems to achieve the field stability necessary for high-quality imaging.

== Clinical applications ==
Despite historically being limited by lower SNR ratios and altered proton relaxation behavior, technological advancements have created several use cases for clinical applications of low-field MRI over regular MRI. First, low-field MRI can act as a direct substitute to regular MRI, especially in lower-income countries. Accessibility to these machines is much greater than regular MRI machines due to lower installation and maintenance costs, reduced reliance on liquid helium as a cooling mechanism, and more flexible requirements for machine placement due to the lower footprints and less need for strong shielding. These requirements make low-field MRI perfect for developing countries without the infrastructure necessary for a typical MRI machine.

Another key area where low-field MRI can be applied is to patients with metal implants or devices. Lower fields cause less pulling of metal, and lower SAR and consequently less RF thermal heating decreases the risk to patients with implants, especially to patients with cardiac implants. Furthermore, lower fields cause less noise and artifact damage to images, making these MRIs perfect for patients with metallic devices.

In terms of specific imaging techniques, major opportunities for applications lie in cardiac and thoracic imaging. First, the improvements to imaging with metallic devices and lower SAR are beneficial to this field. Due to the reduced magnetohydrodynamic effect, ECG gating is improved under lower fields. Furthermore, with metallic devices causing less of a hazard, interventional techniques such as cardiac catheterization can be performed in conjunction with MRI imaging

In terms of thoracic imaging, in regular MRIs of the lungs, air frequently causes distortions to the images. However, in lower-field MRI, this obstruction is greatly reduced, and doctors can even use inhaled oxygen as a contrast agent to view lung tissue and blood movement through the chest. Lung tissues are also much more visible under lower fields due to the longer T2 times under lower fields.

Other novel clinical applications for low-field MRI include other typical MRI use cases in point-of-care settings. For example, neurological cases where the patient cannot be transported could be served by smaller, portable low-field MRI machines without the logistical considerations of transportation. These techniques are also improved by AI developments such as IQT, or image quality transfer, which can help improve image quality without the need for a higher magnetic field

== Current and future industry plans ==
Low-field MRI is undergoing massive and rapid advances in innovation, primarily driven by advances in hardware such as high-performance RF coils and low-noise receive electronics. Current avenues of development are improving diagnostic quality in images through deep-learning reconstruction methods, such as IQT or denoising, and targeting specialized applications such as cardiac imaging. Several companies have taken prominent roles in low-field MRI advancement. Hyperfine, Inc. has enrolled patients in clinical trials about neurological evaluation with AI-powered portable MRI (PMR) technology. Siemens Healthineers has also taken a leading role in the modification of current 1.5T MRI devices to use the lower 0.55T magnetic fields characteristic of low-field MRI. Some projections of the field indicate growth from a market size of US$1 billion to over US$4 billion by 2033, primarily driven by the increasing need for point-of-care MRI diagnostics. Thus, it is expected that future directions for this technology prioritize those point-of-care applications as well as further development of more refined gradient coils and hardware.
