= Praseodymium(III) carbonate =

Names
- IUPAC name Praseodymium(III) carbonate

Identifiers
CAS Number	anhydrous: 5895-45-4; octahydrate: 14948-62-0
3D model (JSmol)	anhydrous: Interactive image; octahydrate: Interactive image
ChemSpider	anhydrous: 144967; octahydrate: 21241398
EC Number	anhydrous: 227-578-9
PubChem CID	anhydrous: 165369; octahydrate: 25022096
CompTox Dashboard (EPA)	anhydrous: DTXSID00648481
- InChI: anhydrous: InChI=1S/3CH2O3.2Pr/c3*2-1(3)4;;/h3*(H2,2,3,4);;/q;;;2*+3/p-6 Key: XIRHLBQGEYXJKG-UHFFFAOYSA-H; octahydrate: InChI=1S/3CH2O3.8H2O.2Pr/c3*2-1(3)4;;;;;;;;;;/h3*(H2,2,3,4);8*1H2;;/q;;;;;;;;;;;2*+3/p-6 Key: SEHQEMTYQGRHIC-UHFFFAOYSA-H
- SMILES: anhydrous: C(=O)([O-])[O-].C(=O)([O-])[O-].C(=O)([O-])[O-].[Pr+3].[Pr+3]; octahydrate: C(=O)([O-])[O-].C(=O)([O-])[O-].C(=O)([O-])[O-].O.O.O.O.O.O.O.O.[Pr+3].[Pr+3]

Properties
Chemical formula	Pr_{2}(CO_{3})_{3}
Molar mass	461.849 (anhydrous); 605.977 (octahydrate)
Appearance	green crystals (octahydrate)
Solubility in water	insoluble (1.99×10^{−6}mol/L)

Related compounds
Other anions	Praseodymium(III) chloroacetate Praseodymium(III) sulfate Praseodymium(III) nitrate
Other cations	cerium carbonate neodymium carbonate
- Except where otherwise noted, data are given for materials in their standard state (at 25 °C [77 °F], 100 kPa). Infobox references

Praseodymium(III) carbonate is an inorganic compound, with a chemical formula of Pr_{2}(CO_{3})_{3}. The anhydrous form is olive green, and many of its hydrates such as heptahydrate and octahydrate are known. They are all insoluble in water.

== Preparation ==
Praseodymium(III) carbonate can be obtained by the hydrolysis of praseodymium(III) chloroacetate:

2 Pr(C_{2}Cl_{3}O_{2})_{3} + 3 H_{2}O → Pr_{2}(CO_{3})_{3} + 6 CHCl_{3} + 3 CO_{2}

It can also be obtained by reacting sodium bicarbonate saturated with carbon dioxide with a praseodymium chloride solution.

== Chemical properties ==
Praseodymium(III) carbonate is soluble in acids, and emits carbon dioxide:

Pr_{2}(CO_{3})_{3} + 6 H^{+} → 2 Pr^{3+} + 3 H_{2}O + 3 CO_{2}↑

However, it is insoluble in water.

== Other compounds ==
Praseodymium(III) carbonate forms compounds with N_{2}H_{4}, such as Pr_{2}(CO_{3})_{3}•12N_{2}H_{4}•5H_{2}O which is a pale green crystal that is slightly soluble in water but insoluble in benzene, with d20°C = 1.873 g/cm^{3}.
