= Neodymium oxide =

Neodymium oxide may refer to:

- Neodymium monoxide (Neodymium(II) oxide), NdO
- Neodymium(III) oxide (Neodymium sesquioxide), Nd_{2}O_{3}
