= Neodymium(III) hydroxide =

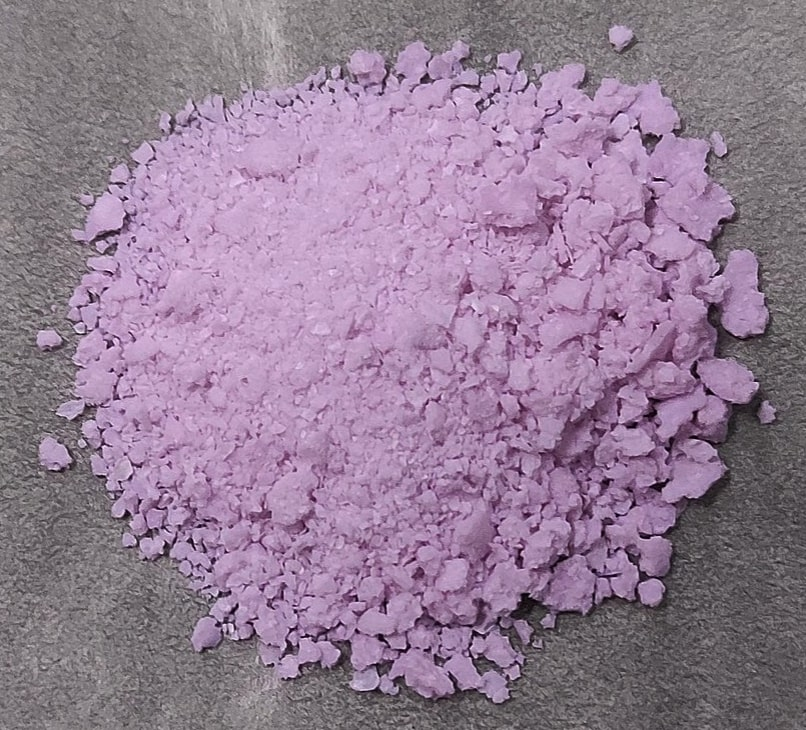

Identifiers
CAS Number	16469-17-3
3D model (JSmol)	Interactive image
ChemSpider	77047
ECHA InfoCard	100.036.816
EC Number	240-514-4
PubChem CID	85433
- InChI: InChI=1S/Nd.3H2O/h;3*1H2/q+3;;;/p-3 Key: ZBAQHMBLDSQPHC-UHFFFAOYSA-K
- SMILES: [Nd+3].[OH-].[OH-].[OH-]

Properties
Chemical formula	Nd(OH)_{3}
Molar mass	195.266
Appearance	rose solid

Related compounds
Other anions	neodymium(III) oxide
Other cations	praseodymium(III) hydroxide samarium(III) hydroxide
- Except where otherwise noted, data are given for materials in their standard state (at 25 °C [77 °F], 100 kPa). Infobox references

Neodymium(III) hydroxide is an insoluble inorganic compound with the chemical formula Nd(OH)_{3}.

== Preparation ==
Neodymium(III) nitrate and ammonia water will react to produce neodymium(III) hydroxide:

Nd(NO_{3})_{3} + 3 NH_{3}·H_{2}O → Nd(OH)_{3}↓ + 3 NH_{4}NO_{3}

If the amount of Nd(NO_{3})_{3} is 40g/L, the amount of ammonia water needed is 0.50 mol/L. The ammonia water is mixed into the Nd(NO_{3})_{3} solution at the speed of 1.5mL/min, and polyethylene glycol is used to control pH. The process will produce neodymium(III) hydroxide powder with grain size ≤1μm.

== Chemical properties ==
Neodymium(III) hydroxide can react with acid and produce neodymium salts:

Nd(OH)_{3} + 3 H^{+} → Nd^{3+} + 3 H_{2}O

For example, to create neodymium acetate with neodymium(III) hydroxide:

Nd(OH)_{3} + 3CH_{3}COOH → Nd(CH_{3}COO)_{3} + 3H_{2}O

== See also ==
- Neodymium
- Hydroxide
- Lanthanide
