= Neodymium(III) oxide =

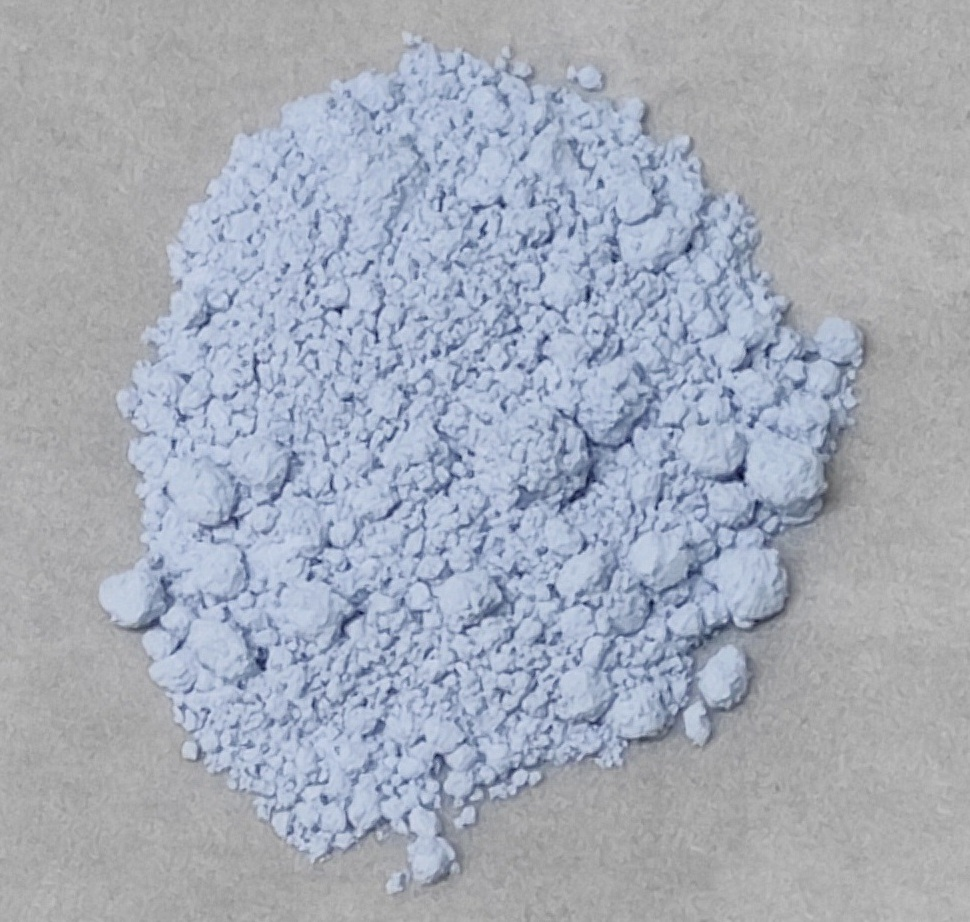

Names
- IUPAC name Neodymium(III) oxide
- Other names Neodymium oxide, Neodymium sesquioxide

Identifiers
CAS Number	1313-97-9
3D model (JSmol)	Interactive image
ChemSpider	3407022
ECHA InfoCard	100.013.832
EC Number	215-214-1
PubChem CID	4196641
UNII	AYT3H319PN
CompTox Dashboard (EPA)	DTXSID2051479
- InChI: InChI=1S/2Nd.3O Key: HBPPDPSYLUIKHU-UHFFFAOYSA-N
- SMILES: O=[Nd]O[Nd]=O

Properties
Chemical formula	Nd_{2}O_{3}
Molar mass	336.48 g/mol
Appearance	light bluish gray hexagonal crystals
Density	7.24 g/cm^{3}
Melting point	2,233 °C (4,051 °F; 2,506 K)
Boiling point	3,760 °C (6,800 °F; 4,030 K)
Solubility in water	.0003 g/100 mL (75 °C)
Magnetic susceptibility (χ)	+10,200.0·10^{−6} cm^{3}/mol

Structure
Crystal structure	Hexagonal, hP5
Space group	P-3m1, No. 164

Thermochemistry
Heat capacity (C)	111.3 J·mol^{−1}·K^{−1}
Std molar entropy (S^{⦵}_{298})	158.6 J·mol^{−1}·K^{−1}
Std enthalpy of formation (Δ_{f}H^{⦵}_{298})	−1807.9 kJ·mol^{−1}

Related compounds
Other anions	Neodymium(II) chloride Neodymium(III) chloride
Other cations	Uranium(VI) oxide Praseodymium(III) oxide Promethium(III) oxide
- Except where otherwise noted, data are given for materials in their standard state (at 25 °C [77 °F], 100 kPa). verify (what is ?) Infobox references

Neodymium(III) oxide or neodymium sesquioxide is the chemical compound composed of neodymium and oxygen with the formula Nd_{2}O_{3}. It forms very light grayish-blue hexagonal crystals. The rare-earth mixture didymium, previously believed to be an element, partially consists of neodymium(III) oxide.

== Uses ==
Neodymium(III) oxide is used to dope glass, including sunglasses, to make solid-state lasers, and to color glasses and enamels. Neodymium-doped glass turns purple due to the absorbance of yellow and green light, and is used in welding goggles. Some neodymium-doped glass is dichroic; that is, it changes color depending on the lighting. One kind of glass named for the mineral alexandrite appears blue in sunlight and red in artificial light. About 7000 tonnes of neodymium(III) oxide are produced worldwide each year. Neodymium(III) oxide is also used as a polymerization catalyst.

== Reactions ==
Neodymium(III) oxide is formed when neodymium(III) nitride or neodymium(III) hydroxide is roasted in air.

== Structure ==
Neodymium(III) oxide has a low-temperature trigonal A form in space group P3̅m1. This structure type is favoured by the early lanthanides. At higher temperatures it adopts two other forms, the hexagonal H form in space group P6_{3}/mmc and the cubic X form in Im3̅m. The high-temperature forms exhibit crystallographic disorder.

Crystal structure of the A form of neodymium(III) oxide
Packing	Neodymium coordination	Oxygen O1 coordination	Oxygen O2 coordination
A-M_{2}O_{3} structure type	approximately capped octahedral	octahedral	approximately tetrahedral
