= Praseodymium compounds =

Chemical compounds

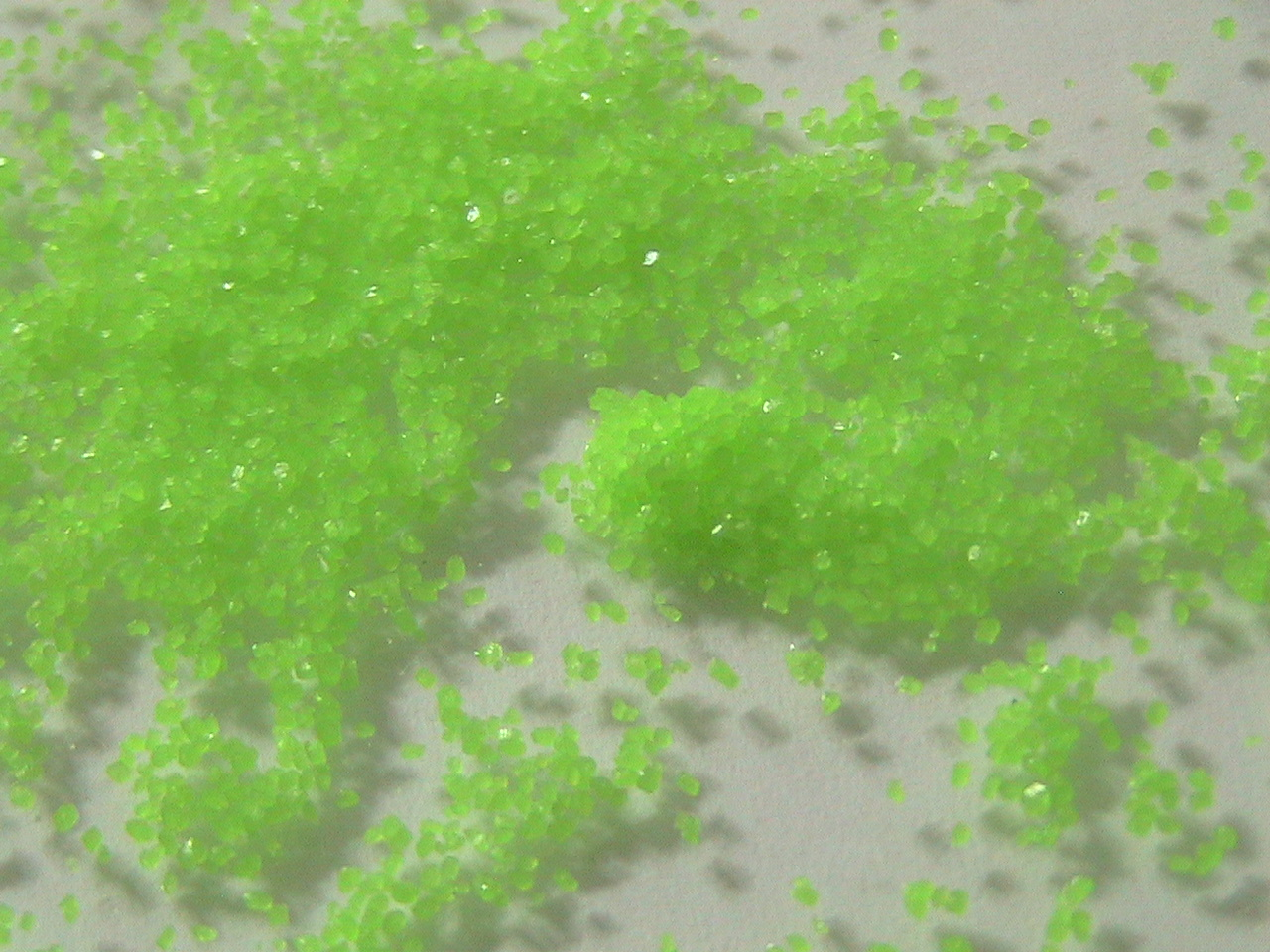
Praseodymium sulfate, a compound of praseodymium

Praseodymium compounds are chemical compounds containing the lanthanide element praseodymium (Pr). The chemistry of praseodymium is dominated by the +3 oxidation state, and many Pr^{3+} compounds are ionic and characteristically green. The +4 oxidation state is also well established, particularly in oxides, fluorides and coordination compounds. Molecular compounds containing Pr^{2+} are known, while praseodymium is currently the only lanthanide for which the formal +5 oxidation state has been experimentally established.

Praseodymium forms a wide variety of inorganic, coordination and organometallic compounds, including oxides, halides, chalcogenides, hydrides, borides, carbides, silicides and pnictides. Its oxide chemistry is especially complex because of the coexistence of Pr^{3+} and Pr^{4+}, while its higher oxidation states and low-valent organometallic chemistry distinguish it from most other lanthanides. Praseodymium compounds are also used or studied in optical materials, ceramic pigments, catalysts, magnetic intermetallics and high-k dielectric materials.

== Properties of praseodymium compounds ==
Selected crystallographic properties of praseodymium compounds are listed below. Lattice parameters refer to the reported crystalline modification and are given in nanometres.

Formula	Appearance	Crystal system	Space group	No.	a (nm)	b (nm)	c (nm)	Density (g/cm^{3})	Ref.
β-PrF_{3}	Green	Hexagonal	P3̅c1	165	0.70795	—	0.72380	6.28	
PrCl_{3}	Blue-green	Hexagonal	P6_{3}/m	176	0.7423	—	0.4272	4.03	
PrBr_{3}	Green	Hexagonal	P6_{3}/m	176	0.79248	—	0.43886	5.28	
PrI_{3}	Green	Orthorhombic	Cmcm	63	0.43281	1.4003	0.9988	5.8	
A-Pr_{2}O_{3}	—	Hexagonal	P3̅m1	164	0.3857	—	0.6016	—	
PrO_{2}	Dark brown	Cubic	Fm3̅m	225	0.5393	—	—	—	
PrS	—	Cubic	Fm3̅m	225	0.5743	—	—	6.065	
PrAs	—	Cubic	Fm3̅m	225	0.6009	—	—	6.607	
PrSb	—	Cubic	Fm3̅m	225	0.6366	—	—	6.762	
PrTe_{2}	—	Tetragonal	P4	75	0.89680	—	1.8119	—	
PrB_{4}	—	Tetragonal	P4/mbm	127	0.7235	—	0.4116	—	
PrB_{6}	—	Cubic	Pm3̅m	221	0.413	—	—	—	
PrC_{2}	—	Tetragonal	I4/mmm	139	0.3855	—	0.6434	5.728	
Pr_{2}C_{3}	—	Cubic	I4̅3d	220	0.86072	—	—	6.621	
Pr(OH)_{3}	Light green	Hexagonal	P6_{3}/m	176	0.6456	—	0.3769	—	

== Halides ==
=== Trihalides ===
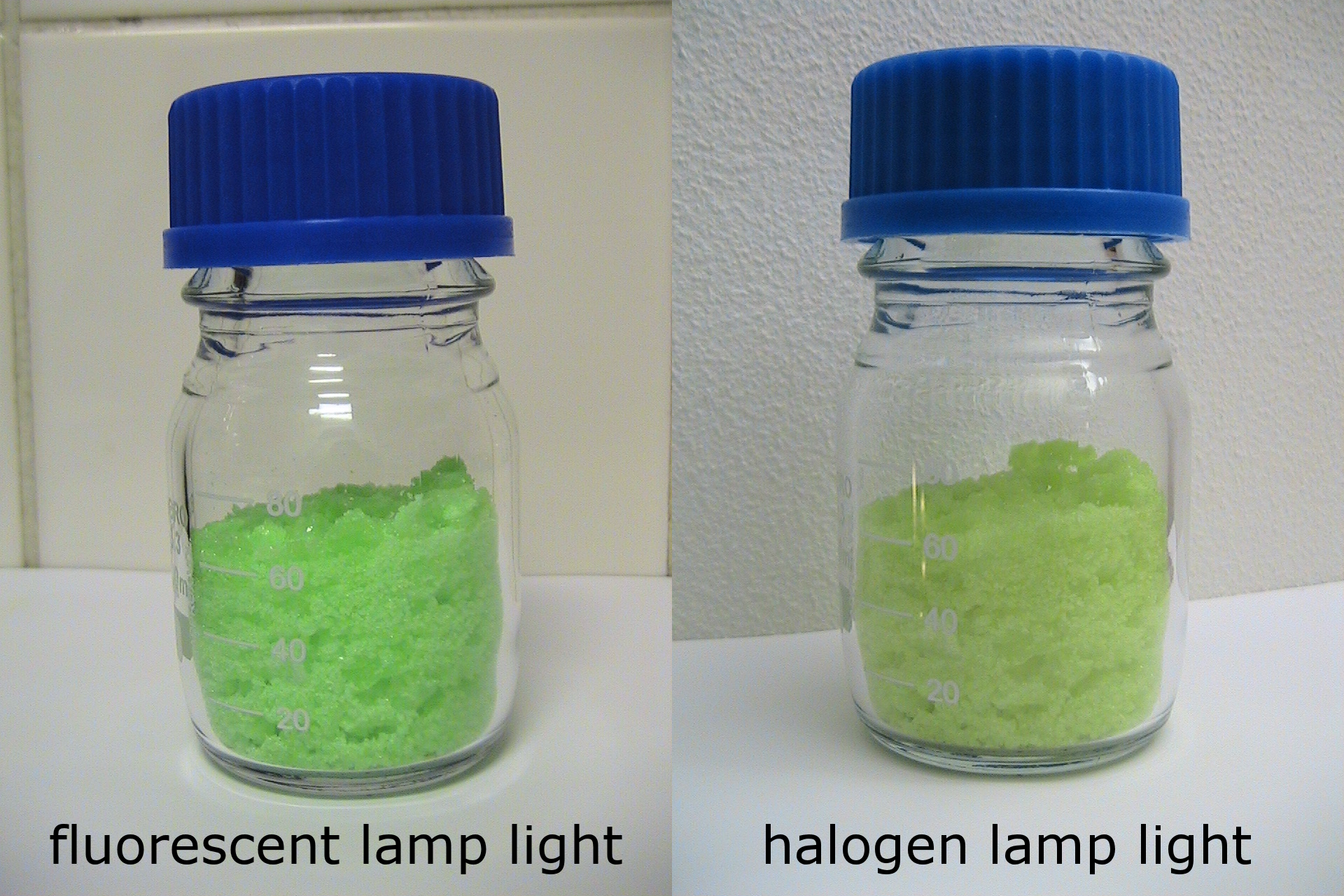
Praseodymium(III) chloride heptahydrate under fluorescent light (left) and halogen light (right).

Praseodymium forms the four trihalides PrF_{3}, PrCl_{3}, PrBr_{3} and PrI_{3}, all containing Pr^{3+}. They can be prepared by direct reaction of praseodymium metal with the corresponding halogen. Their structures change across the series as the halide ion becomes larger: PrF_{3} is nine-coordinate and adopts the tysonite-type structure, PrCl_{3} and PrBr_{3} have the hexagonal UCl_{3} structure type, and PrI_{3} adopts the orthorhombic PuBr_{3} type.

Praseodymium(III) fluoride, PrF_{3}, is a green crystalline solid and is the thermodynamically stable binary fluoride of Pr^{3+}. It can be precipitated from aqueous praseodymium(III) salts with fluoride ions; reaction of praseodymium(III) nitrate with sodium fluoride, for example, has been used to prepare hollow PrF_{3} nanoparticles by microwave-assisted hydrothermal synthesis.

Praseodymium(III) chloride, PrCl_{3}, is a blue-green anhydrous solid that readily forms hydrated salts, most notably the light-green heptahydrate. Anhydrous material can be purified by vacuum sublimation, while rapid heating of hydrated PrCl_{3} may cause partial hydrolysis. Like other early-lanthanide trichlorides, PrCl_{3} is a hard Lewis acid. It forms ternary chlorides with alkali-metal chlorides; reaction with potassium chloride gives K_{2}PrCl_{5}, whose optical and magnetic properties have been investigated spectroscopically.

Praseodymium(III) bromide, PrBr_{3}, adopts the hexagonal UCl_{3} structure type. The Pr^{3+} ions are nine-coordinate in a tricapped trigonal-prismatic environment. Neutron-diffraction measurements give two sets of Pr–Br distances, approximately 3.05 and 3.13 Å, and have also been used to determine the crystal-field splitting of Pr^{3+} in both PrBr_{3} and PrCl_{3}.

Praseodymium(III) iodide, PrI_{3}, can be prepared either by heating praseodymium with iodine under an inert atmosphere or by reaction of the metal with mercury(II) iodide. It is a hygroscopic green solid with the orthorhombic PuBr_{3} structure type, space group Cmcm. Reported lattice parameters are a = 0.43281(6) nm, b = 1.4003(6) nm and c = 0.9988(3) nm. Although that study principally concerns PrI_{2}, it also reports crystallographic data for PrI_{3} and praseodymium oxyiodide.

=== Praseodymium(IV) fluoride ===
Praseodymium(IV) fluoride, PrF_{4}, is one of the few simple binary halides containing tetravalent praseodymium. It can be prepared by fluorination of a mixture of PrF_{3} and sodium fluoride to give Na_{2}PrF_{6}, followed by extraction of the sodium fluoride component with liquid hydrogen fluoride. PrF_{4} forms pale yellow crystals with the UF_{4} structure type. The +4 oxidation state is strongly oxidising: the tetrafluoride decomposes on heating to PrF_{3} and fluorine and reacts with water rather than forming a stable aqueous Pr^{4+} species.

Other complex Pr^{4+} fluorides are more stable than the binary tetrafluoride because the high oxidation state is stabilized within extended fluoride lattices. Hexafluoropraseodymate(IV) salts such as Na_{2}PrF_{6} are therefore important intermediates in the preparation and chemistry of PrF_{4}.

=== Reduced halides ===
Praseodymium also forms several electron-rich halides with halogen-to-metal ratios below three. The best known is bronze-coloured praseodymium diiodide, PrI_{2}. Despite its formal stoichiometry, it is not best described as an ionic Pr^{2+} salt. Its short Pr–I distances, metallic conductivity and electronic structure instead support the formulation Pr^{3+}I_{2}(e^{−}): praseodymium remains essentially trivalent and the additional electron occupies a metal-derived conduction band.

At least five structural modifications of PrI_{2} are known. Four are related to familiar layered structure types, including MoS_{2}- and CdCl_{2}-type arrangements, while modification V has a cubic structure containing cubane-like [Pr_{4}I_{4}]^{4+} clusters. In the latter phase the praseodymium atoms form tetrahedral groups and the observed distortions have been attributed to Pr–Pr bonding. The cubic modification crystallizes in space group F4̅3m with a ≈ 1.236 nm.

Intermediate compositions are also known in the bromide and iodide systems. Pr_{2}Br_{5} and Pr_{2}I_{5} are isostructural layered compounds and are likewise better described as “free-electron” halides, (Pr^{3+})_{2}(X^{−})_{5}(e^{−}), rather than conventional mixed-valence Pr^{2+}/Pr^{3+} salts. Both are semiconducting and show unusually high magnetic ordering temperatures for praseodymium halides: Pr_{2}Br_{5} orders antiferromagnetically at 50(1) K and Pr_{2}I_{5} at 37(1) K. The structure of Pr_{2}X_{5} can be regarded as an intergrowth of structural motifs related to the corresponding trihalide and reduced-halide phases, with two crystallographically inequivalent Pr^{3+} sites.

== Chalcogenides ==
=== Oxides ===
Praseodymium forms an unusually complex series of oxides spanning compositions from praseodymium(III) oxide, Pr_{2}O_{3}, to praseodymium(IV) oxide, PrO_{2}. Between these end members is a homologous series of mixed-valence oxides with the general composition Pr_{n}O_{2n-2}. The most stable oxide in air at room temperature is praseodymium(III,IV) oxide, Pr_{6}O_{11}, in which both Pr^{3+} and Pr^{4+} are present.

Praseodymium(III) oxide, Pr_{2}O_{3}, is yellow-green and occurs in two principal polymorphs. The thermodynamically stable high-temperature form has the hexagonal A-type rare-earth sesquioxide structure, whereas a metastable cubic C-type form with the bixbyite structure can also be obtained. The hexagonal phase has lattice parameters of approximately a = 0.3859 nm and c = 0.6008 nm.

Praseodymium(IV) oxide, PrO_{2}, crystallizes in the cubic fluorite structure, with Pr^{4+} eight-coordinate to oxygen. It is less stable than Pr_{6}O_{11} under ambient conditions and requires strongly oxidizing conditions for bulk preparation; highly oxidized material can also be obtained by prolonged treatment of Pr_{6}O_{11} with hot water.

Praseodymium(III,IV) oxide, Pr_{6}O_{11}, has a defect-fluorite-derived structure and is black. It readily exchanges oxygen with the surrounding atmosphere, and heating or cooling at different oxygen partial pressures produces a sequence of intermediate oxide phases between Pr_{2}O_{3} and PrO_{2}. This ability to reversibly incorporate and release lattice oxygen is responsible for much of the catalytic interest in praseodymium oxides.

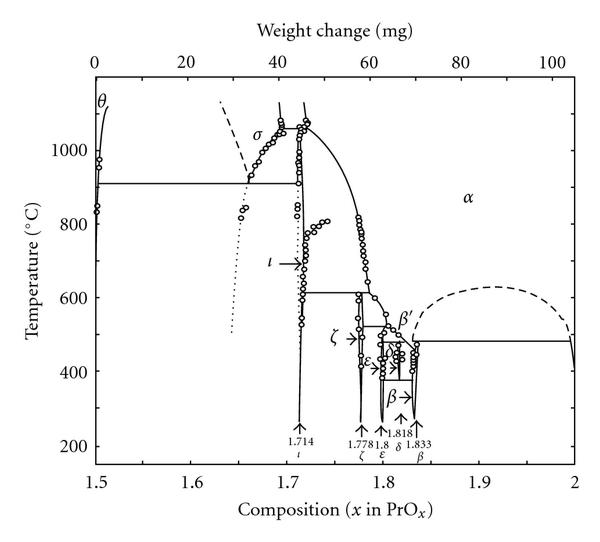
Praseodymium–oxygen system

The well-established members of the homologous oxide series include:

Formula	Phase	x in PrO_{x}	Average oxidation state of Pr
Pr_{2}O_{3}	θ	1.500	+3
Pr_{7}O_{12}	ι	1.714	+3.429
Pr_{9}O_{16}	ζ	1.778	+3.556
Pr_{5}O_{9}	ε	1.800	+3.600
Pr_{11}O_{20}	δ	1.818	+3.636
Pr_{6}O_{11}	β	1.833	+3.667
PrO_{2}	α	2.000	+4

=== Other chalcogenides ===
Praseodymium forms monochalcogenides PrS, PrSe and PrTe. All three adopt the cubic sodium chloride structure at ambient pressure and are metallic. Although the 1:1 stoichiometry might suggest Pr^{2+}, electronic-structure studies instead support predominantly trivalent praseodymium with two localized 4f electrons and an additional conduction electron. Among them, PrTe undergoes an experimentally observed pressure-induced transition from the sodium chloride structure to the caesium chloride structure near 9 GPa, accompanied by a volume collapse of about 11.5%.

Praseodymium(III) sulfide, Pr_{2}S_{3}, crystallizes at ambient conditions in the orthorhombic A-type rare-earth sesquisulfide structure, space group Pnma. Its lattice parameters are approximately a = 0.74822 nm, b = 0.40551 nm and c = 1.56074 nm, and the two crystallographically distinct Pr^{3+} sites have coordination numbers of seven and eight. Single crystals can be grown by reaction of reduced praseodymium chlorides with sulfur in the presence of an alkali-halide flux.

The praseodymium–selenium system is particularly rich. In addition to Pr_{2}Se_{3} and PrSe, several selenium-rich phases occur between Pr_{2}Se_{3} and PrSe_{2}. Pr_{2}Se_{3} has been reported in the cubic Th_{3}P_{4} structure type, space group I4̅3d, with a lattice parameter of approximately 0.891 nm.

Thermal decomposition of praseodymium diselenide, PrSe_{2}, proceeds stepwise through discrete intermediate phases with approximate compositions PrSe_{1.90}, PrSe_{1.85} and PrSe_{1.80} before reaching Pr_{2}Se_{3}. PrSe_{2} itself is monoclinic and contains Se^{2−}_{2} dimers in planar selenium layers, while PrSe_{1.85} has an incommensurately modulated structure arising from ordered selenium vacancies and charge-density modulation.

The praseodymium–tellurium system contains a similarly broad range of phases, including PrTe, Pr_{2}Te_{3}, several intermediate compositions, and the polytelluride PrTe_{2}. Praseodymium ditelluride, PrTe_{2}, can be prepared by chemical vapour transport from praseodymium and tellurium using iodine as a transport agent. It crystallizes in a tetragonal superstructure, space group P4, with lattice parameters a = 0.89680 nm and c = 1.8119 nm. Its structure contains alternating praseodymium–tellurium slabs and planar tellurium layers in which Te atoms form several polyanionic motifs, including Te_{2} dumbbells and four-membered Te_{4} units.

== Hydrides ==
Praseodymium forms a continuous series of hydrogen-rich phases conventionally described in terms of the dihydride PrH_{2} and trihydride PrH_{3}. At ordinary pressures, compositions between approximately PrH_{2} and PrH_{3} retain the cubic fluorite-derived metal sublattice: in the dihydride the hydrogen atoms occupy tetrahedral interstices, while additional hydrogen at higher H/Pr ratios enters octahedral interstices. The cubic lattice parameter decreases from about 0.5515 nm for PrH_{2} to about 0.5486 nm near the trihydride composition. Measurements of hydrogen dissociation pressures between 250 and 450 °C show that the cubic hydride accommodates substantial additional hydrogen continuously over compositions PrH_(^{+}_{2}x), rather than undergoing the structural change found in several heavier rare-earth hydrides. Subsequent thermal studies likewise found no phase transition within the PrH^{−}_{2}PrH_{3} system under hydrogen pressures near atmospheric pressure.

At very high pressures, much more hydrogen-rich praseodymium hydrides can be formed. Laser heating of praseodymium in a hydrogen-rich environment above 100 GPa produces superhydride PrH_{9} in both cubic F4̅3m and hexagonal P6_{3}/mmc modifications. At 120 GPa the measured lattice parameters are a = 0.4967 nm for the cubic phase and a = 0.3588 nm, c = 0.5458 nm for the hexagonal phase. Electrical-resistance measurements showed a field-dependent drop below about 9 K, interpreted as a possible superconducting transition, although zero resistance was not reached because the samples contained mixed phases.

== Borides ==
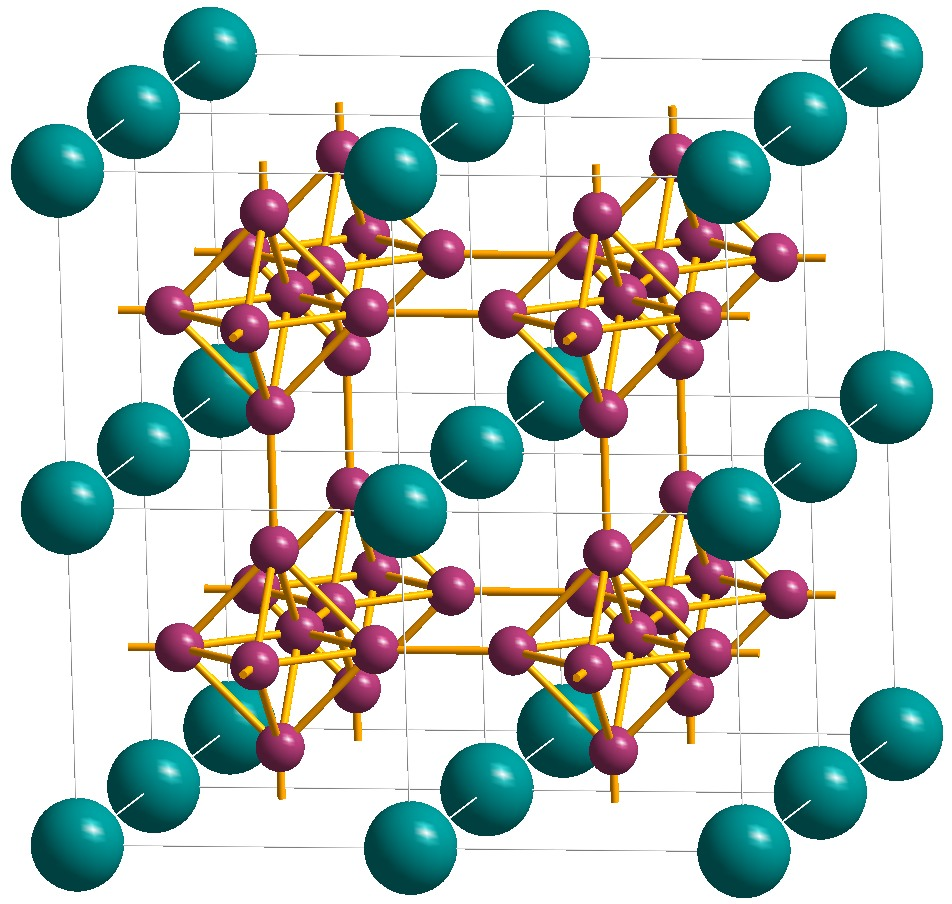
Structure of praseodymium hexaboride (PrB_{6})

The praseodymium–boron system contains several binary borides, including Pr_{2}B_{5}, PrB_{4} and PrB_{6}; the boron-richer dodecaboride PrB_{12} has also been synthesized under high pressure. The structures of these compounds contain increasingly extensive boron frameworks. PrB_{4} and PrB_{6} were among the earliest well-characterized praseodymium borides: PrB_{4} has the tetragonal ThB_{4} structure type, whereas PrB_{6} adopts the cubic calcium hexaboride structure built from interconnected B_{6} octahedra.

Pr_{2}B_{5} crystallizes in a monoclinic structure of space group C2/c, with lattice parameters a = 1.51603 nm, b = 0.72771 nm, c = 0.73137 nm and β = 109.607°. Its structure contains a three-dimensional boron framework incorporating B_{6} octahedra together with additional boron atoms; it is closely related to the structures of Gd_{2}B_{5} and Sm_{2}B_{5}.

Praseodymium tetraboride, PrB_{4}, crystallizes in the tetragonal space group P4/mbm. Its boron substructure consists of chains of B_{6} octahedra parallel to the c axis, linked by B_{2} units, with the praseodymium atoms occupying channels within the boron framework. It shows strongly anisotropic low-temperature magnetism arising from crystal-field-split Pr^{3+} states. Measurements on single crystals reveal two magnetic transitions, with antiferromagnetic long-range order appearing below about 19.5 K and a first-order transition near 15.9 K to an induced-moment ferromagnetic ground state; the low-temperature saturation moment reaches approximately 2.1 μ_{B} per Pr ion.

Praseodymium hexaboride, PrB_{6}, crystallizes in the cubic CaB_{6} structure type, space group Pm3̅m, in which a three-dimensional framework of linked B_{6} octahedra encloses the praseodymium atoms. It is a metallic antiferromagnet and undergoes two low-temperature magnetic transitions: an incommensurate antiferromagnetic phase develops at approximately 6.9 K, followed near 4.2 K by a transition into a commensurate magnetic phase. Neutron diffraction gives a low-temperature ordered moment of about 1.77 μ_{B} per Pr ion, while inelastic-neutron studies show that the Γ_{5} crystal-field triplet is split on entering the magnetically ordered phases.

Praseodymium dodecaboride, PrB_{12}, was first synthesized at high pressure in 2022. It can be produced from a stoichiometric mixture of PrB_{6} and boron in a laser-heated diamond anvil cell, with formation observed at approximately 35 GPa. Relative to PrB_{6}, the coordination environment of the rare-earth atom changes from a truncated cube to a larger truncated-octahedral boron cage, producing shorter Pr–B distances and increased bulk modulus and hardness.

== Carbides and silicides ==
=== Carbides ===
Praseodymium forms two well-characterized binary carbides, praseodymium dicarbide (PrC_{2}) and praseodymium sesquicarbide (Pr_{2}C_{3}). At ambient conditions, PrC_{2} crystallizes in the body-centred tetragonal calcium carbide structure type. Neutron diffraction studies show that the compound contains discrete C_{2} units and that the Pr atoms remain essentially trivalent. PrC_{2} is metallic and shows unusual low-temperature magnetic behaviour: neutron diffraction indicates antiferromagnetic ordering near 18 K, while low-field susceptibility measurements show a ferromagnetic transition near 7 K.

Pr_{2}C_{3} crystallizes in the body-centred cubic Pu_{2}C_{3} structure type, space group I4̅3d, and also contains discrete C_{2} units. Neutron diffraction gives a C–C distance of about 1.239 Å and indicates that the praseodymium atoms have the trivalent Hund-rule ground state. The sesquicarbide becomes antiferromagnetic below approximately 8.2 K. Its ordered magnetic moment is strongly reduced from the free-ion Pr^{3+} value, a consequence of the particularly strong crystal-field effects in the praseodymium carbides.

=== Silicides ===
The praseodymium–silicon system contains a considerably larger number of binary phases. Well-established compounds include Pr_{5}Si_{3}, Pr_{5}Si_{4}, PrSi, Pr_{3}Si_{4}, PrSi_{1.33} and silicon-deficient disilicide PrSi_{2-x}. A systematic reinvestigation of the binary system confirmed the existence and structure types of these phases and showed that, with the exception of PrSi_{2-x}, they generally undergo ferromagnetic ordering below about 110 K. Pr_{5}Si_{3} crystallizes in the body-centred tetragonal Cr_{5}B_{3} structure type and orders ferromagnetically at about 44–47 K; Pr_{5}Si_{4} and PrSi have Curie temperatures of about 40 and 51 K, respectively. Pr_{3}Si_{4}, whose crystal structure is orthorhombic and isotypic with Ho_{3}Si_{4}, orders near 105 K and shows magnetic behaviour consistent with a ferrimagnetic component, whereas PrSi_{2-x} is antiferromagnetic below about 11 K and undergoes a further spin reorientation near 9 K.

Among these phases, Pr_{5}Si_{3} has received particular attention because of its comparatively large magnetocaloric response. Polycrystalline samples show a reversible magnetic entropy change of about 11.6 J kg^{−1} K^{−1} for a field change of 50 kOe near 47 K, associated with a second-order ferromagnetic-to-paramagnetic transition. Single crystals have also been grown by the floating-zone method, allowing the strong magnetic anisotropy and metallic electrical transport of Pr_{5}Si_{3} to be studied directly.

== Pnictides ==
=== Monopnictides ===
Praseodymium forms the five monopnictides PrN, PrP, PrAs, PrSb and PrBi. They adopt the cubic sodium chloride structure type, as is characteristic of most rare-earth monopnictides.

Praseodymium nitride, PrN, has a room-temperature lattice parameter of approximately 0.5135 nm. Like the other rare-earth mononitrides, it is sensitive to oxidation and hydrolysis, which historically made preparation of stoichiometric material difficult. The electronic structure of PrN has consequently been studied extensively by first-principles methods; calculations generally find the rocksalt phase to be the most stable ambient-pressure structure, although details of its magnetic and electronic ground state depend strongly on how the localized 4f electrons are treated.

The heavier monopnictides PrP, PrAs, PrSb and PrBi are metallic compounds in which the praseodymium 4f electrons remain largely localized. PrP, PrAs and PrSb have been grown as single crystals and show Van Vleck paramagnetism with no long-range magnetic ordering in the temperature range studied; their low-temperature susceptibility is governed by crystal-field splitting of the Pr^{3+} states. Similar Van Vleck behaviour is observed in PrBi, PrSb and PrAs; pressure increases their low-temperature magnetic susceptibility without inducing magnetic order.

PrSb and PrBi have attracted renewed interest because of their electronic-transport properties. Both show extremely large, nonsaturating magnetoresistance at low temperature, together with quantum oscillations arising from small electron and hole Fermi surfaces. Combined photoemission and transport measurements indicate that the large magnetoresistance can be explained primarily by high carrier mobility and near compensation between electron and hole populations rather than by topological surface states.

=== Other pnictides ===
The praseodymium–phosphorus system contains several phosphorus-rich compounds in addition to PrP, including PrP_{2}, PrP_{5} and PrP_{7}. PrP_{2} has the monoclinic NdAs_{2} structure type, whereas PrP_{5} adopts the NdP_{5} structure type and PrP_{7} the LaP_{7} type. The reported lattice parameters of PrP_{2} are approximately a = 0.4032 nm, b = 0.6553 nm and c = 1.0105 nm with β = 105.97°, illustrating the increasingly complex phosphorus substructures formed as the P:Pr ratio increases.

Praseodymium diantimonide, PrSb_{2}, is a layered orthorhombic compound of the LaSb_{2} structure type. Its lattice parameters are approximately a = 0.6230 nm, b = 0.6063 nm and c = 1.789 nm. Unlike the Van Vleck-paramagnetic monopnictides, PrSb_{2} undergoes antiferromagnetic ordering near 5 K and shows field-induced metamagnetic transitions. Applying hydrostatic pressure raises the Néel temperature at about 1.3–1.6 K GPa^{−1}, while also changing the fields at which the metamagnetic transitions occur.

== Other compounds ==
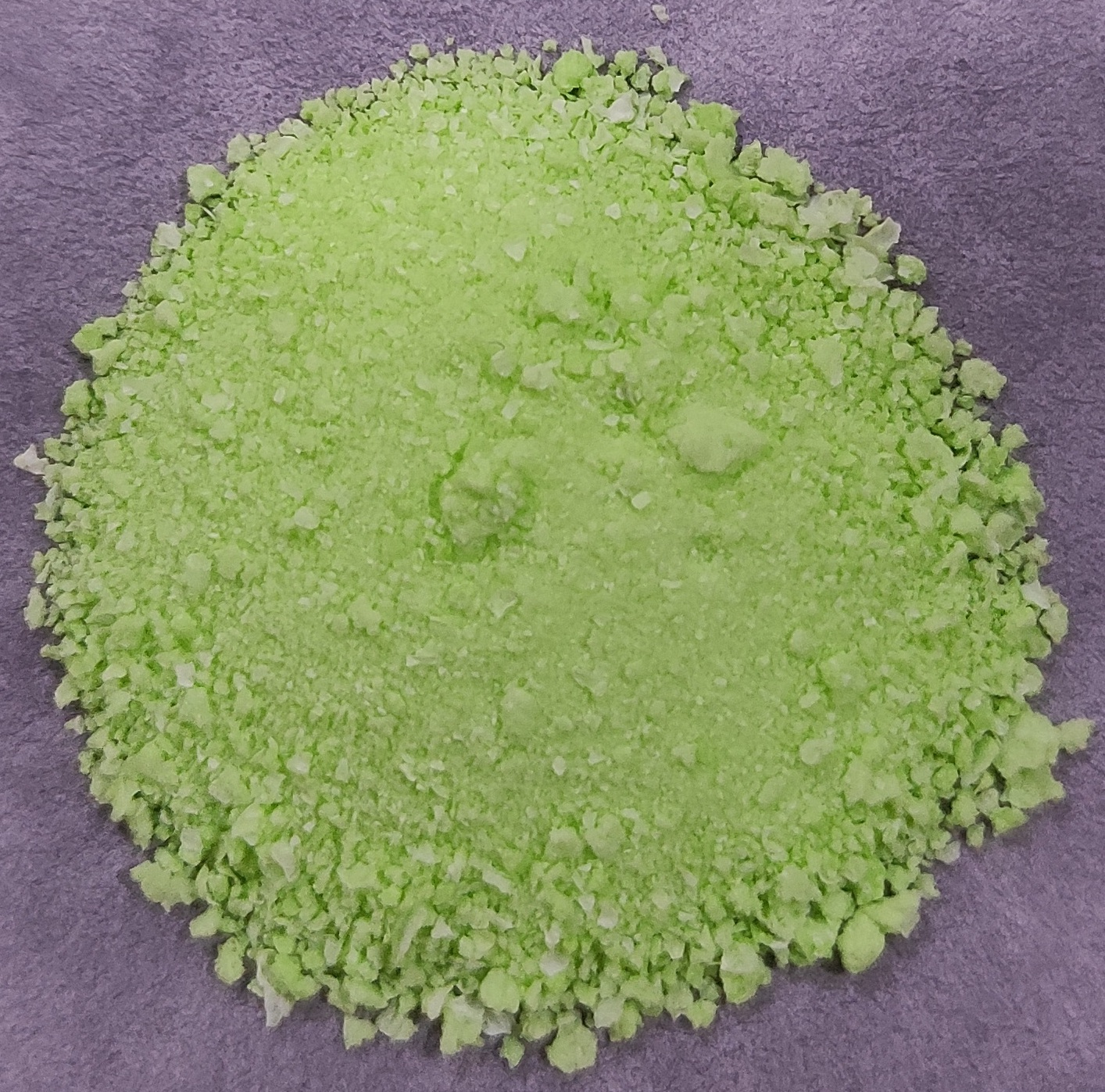
Praseodymium(III) hydroxide

Praseodymium(III) hydroxide, Pr(OH)_{3}, is a light green solid that can be precipitated from aqueous Pr^{3+} solutions by addition of a strong base. It crystallizes in a hexagonal structure; hydrothermally prepared material has reported lattice parameters of approximately a = 0.6456 nm and c = 0.3769 nm. On heating, Pr(OH)_{3} is converted ultimately to mixed-valence Pr_{6}O_{11}; the morphology of the resulting oxide depends strongly on that of the hydroxide precursor. Thermal decomposition studies of hydroxide and hydrated carbonate precursors likewise give Pr_{6}O_{11} as the final oxide at high temperature.

Praseodymium(III) nitrate, Pr(NO_{3})_{3}, readily forms hydrated crystals. The commonly characterised hexahydrate is more precisely formulated as [Pr(NO_{3})_{3}(H_{2}O)_{4}]·2H_{2}O. Single-crystal X-ray diffraction shows that each Pr^{3+} ion is ten-coordinate, surrounded by three bidentate nitrate ions and four directly coordinated water molecules in a distorted bicapped square-antiprismatic environment; two additional water molecules occupy lattice sites and participate in an extended hydrogen-bonding network. Thermal decomposition of hydrated praseodymium nitrate produces water and nitrogen oxides and ultimately yields Pr_{6}O_{11}, with the oxide phase and surface area depending on the decomposition conditions.

Praseodymium(III) sulfate, Pr_{2}(SO_{4})_{3}, is known in both anhydrous and hydrated forms. The octahydrate Pr_{2}(SO_{4})_{3}·8H_{2}O forms light green monoclinic crystals in space group C2/c; at room temperature its lattice parameters are a = 1.37058 nm, b = 0.68664 nm, c = 1.84702 nm and β = 102.816°. Each Pr^{3+} centre is eight-coordinate, bonded to four sulfate oxygen atoms and four water molecules, while bridging sulfate groups link the coordination polyhedra into a three-dimensional network. Anhydrous Pr_{2}(SO_{4})_{3} is also monoclinic, C2/c, and shows strongly anisotropic thermal expansion; in an argon atmosphere it remains stable to approximately 870 °C. An earlier single-crystal study of the octahydrate likewise found eight-coordinate praseodymium and sulfate ions acting as bridging ligands between neighbouring metal centres.

Praseodymium(III) oxalate forms hydrated coordination polymers. The hexahydrate is more precisely described as [Pr_{2}(C_{2}O_{4})_{3}(H_{2}O)_{4}]·2H_{2}O and crystallizes in the monoclinic space group P2_{1}/c. In its structure, each Pr^{3+} ion is nine-coordinate in a distorted tricapped trigonal-prismatic environment, while oxalate groups bridge adjacent praseodymium centres to generate a three-dimensional network; coordinated and lattice water molecules further link the structure through hydrogen bonding. Other hydrated oxalates have also been reported. On heating in air, hydrated praseodymium oxalate loses water in several stages before decomposing through oxycarbonate intermediates to mixed-valence Pr_{6}O_{11}.

Praseodymium(III) acetate, Pr(CH_{3}COO)_{3}, forms both hydrated and anhydrous phases. Anhydrous Pr(CH_{3}COO)_{3} crystallizes in the tetragonal space group P4̅2_{1}c, with a = 2.1065 nm and c = 1.3236 nm. There are three crystallographically distinct Pr^{3+} sites, coordinated by nine or ten oxygen atoms, and the acetate ligands bridge the metal centres to form a complicated three-dimensional network. The anhydrous compound can be obtained by dehydration of Pr(CH_{3}COO)_{3}·1.5H_{2}O at 180 °C, and further heating leads through basic acetate and oxycarbonate intermediates before ultimately producing praseodymium oxide.

Praseodymium(III) phosphate, PrPO_{4}, adopts the monoclinic monazite structure, space group P2_{1}/n, with lattice parameters a = 0.6741 nm, b = 0.6961 nm, c = 0.6416 nm and β = 103.63°. Each Pr^{3+} ion is coordinated by nine oxygen atoms, while slightly distorted PO_{4} tetrahedra link the praseodymium coordination polyhedra into the extended monazite lattice. Hydrated praseodymium phosphate can instead adopt a hexagonal rhabdophane-type structure; hydrothermal synthesis of hydrated PrPO_{4} followed by heating transforms the material to the denser monoclinic monazite phase.

== Coordination compounds ==
Ball-and-stick model of the eight-coordinate [Pr(DMSO)_{8}]^{3+} cation

The coordination chemistry of praseodymium is dominated by the large, electropositive Pr^{3+} ion and broadly resembles that of the other early lanthanides, particularly La^{3+}, Ce^{3+} and Nd^{3+}. High coordination numbers are common because bonding is largely ionic and shows relatively little directional preference. An example is the octakis(dimethyl sulfoxide) complex [Pr(DMSO)_{8}]^{3+}, in which eight dimethyl sulfoxide (DMSO) ligands coordinate through oxygen to give a distorted square-antiprismatic coordination environment. The ion has been crystallographically characterized in the salt [Pr(DMSO)_{8}]_{2}[Mo_{6}Ag_{6}S_{24}].

Praseodymium nitrate forms both 1:1 and 4:3 complexes with 18-crown-6. The 1:1 compound [Pr(NO_{3})_{3}(^{−}_{18}crown^{−}_{6})] has been structurally characterized and contains a twelve-coordinate Pr^{3+} centre surrounded by the six oxygen atoms of the crown ether and three bidentate nitrate ions, giving an approximately icosahedral coordination environment. The complex crystallizes in the orthorhombic space group Pbca. More recent studies of [Pr(NO_{3})_{3}(^{−}_{18}crown^{−}_{6})] and its aza-crown analogue have examined their magnetic relaxation behaviour, although unlike the corresponding cerium and neodymium complexes they do not show slow magnetic relaxation under the conditions studied.

Bulky ligands can instead enforce unusually low coordination numbers. The volatile amide Pr[N(SiMe_{3})_{2}]_{3} is a three-coordinate molecular Pr^{3+} compound whose structure has been investigated by gas-phase electron diffraction. Addition of two isocyanide ligands gives five-coordinate complexes such as Pr[N(SiMe_{3})_{2}]_{3}(CNBut)_{2}, in which the Pr^{3+} centre has a trigonal-bipyramidal environment.

Molecular coordination chemistry of Pr^{4+} is much less extensive but has developed rapidly. In 2020 the first molecular Pr^{4+} complex, [Pr(OSiPh_{3})_{4}(MeCN)_{2}], was isolated by oxidation of the Pr^{3+} precursor [KPr(OSiPh_{3})_{4}(THF)_{3}]; crystallography, spectroscopy, magnetometry and electrochemistry supported assignment of the +4 oxidation state. Oxo and siloxide ligands have subsequently enabled substantially more stable high-valent species. In 2026, oxo-bridged mixed-valent Pr^{3+}/Pr^{4+} and Pr^{4+}/Pr^{4+} dinuclear complexes were isolated; the mixed-valent compound contains a short, strongly polarized Pr^{IV}–O interaction with appreciable multiple-bond character, while the fully oxidized Pr^{4+} complex remains stable in solution at room temperature for extended periods.

== Praseodymium(V) compounds ==
Praseodymium is currently the only lanthanide for which the +5 oxidation state has been experimentally established. Interest in pentavalent praseodymium dates back more than a century: Pr(V) was proposed in the early twentieth century, and a supposed pentavalent praseodymium oxide was reported in 1938, but later work showed that the material contained only Pr^{3+} and Pr^{4+}. For much of the twentieth century, +4 therefore remained the highest securely established oxidation state of praseodymium.

=== Gas-phase and matrix-isolated compounds ===
Structural formula of PrNO, a matrix-isolated compound containing praseodymium in the +5 oxidation state.

The first experimentally confirmed Pr^{5+} species were reported in 2016. Laser-ablation and matrix-isolation experiments produced the oxide species PrO_{4} and PrO^{+}_{2}, and infrared spectroscopy together with quantum-chemical calculations showed that the praseodymium centres have the formal +5 oxidation state. These compounds established that removal of the final 4f electron from Pr^{4+} to give the formally 4f^{0} Pr^{5+} configuration is chemically possible when sufficiently electronegative ligands are present.

A second family of Pr^{5+} species was identified in 2017 with the linear nitride oxide PrNO. It is formed by co-condensation of laser-ablated praseodymium atoms with nitric oxide in a solid neon matrix and contains a formally triple Pr≡N bond together with a Pr=O double bond. Electronic-structure calculations assign the neutral PrNO molecule a 4f^{0} Pr^{5+} centre, whereas the related anion PrO^{−} has a 4f^{1} configuration and is better described as Pr^{4+}.

Fluoride ligands have also been investigated as possible stabilizers of Pr^{5+}. Matrix-isolation experiments in 2015 detected PrF_{3} and PrF_{4}, together with evidence for lower fluorides, but did not produce the predicted molecule PrF_{5}; calculations indicated that isolated PrF_{5} is strongly susceptible to decomposition.

=== Molecular and solid-state compounds ===
In 2025, the first isolable molecular complex of praseodymium in the formal +5 oxidation state was reported. Oxidation of a four-coordinate Pr^{4+} imidophosphorane precursor at low temperature gave salts containing the cation [Pr(NP(t^{−}Bu)_{3})_{4}]^{+}, with either hexafluorophosphate or tetrakis(pentafluorophenyl)borate as the counter-ion. Single-crystal X-ray diffraction, solution spectroscopy, magnetic measurements and multireference calculations support the Pr^{5+} assignment. The cation has a highly multiconfigurational singlet ground state and an inverted ligand field, in which substantial ligand-to-metal donation populates Pr-centred orbitals despite the formal +5 oxidation state. The strongly donating imidophosphorane ligands therefore stabilize a high formal oxidation state while reducing the effective positive charge at the metal centre.

Extended solid Pr^{5+} compounds have also been explored theoretically. In 2024, quantum-chemical structure searches predicted that CsPrF_{6} should be thermodynamically stable, with octahedral [PrF_{6}]^{−} anions containing closed-shell Pr^{5+} embedded in a Cs^{+} lattice. CsPrF_{6} has not yet been experimentally isolated, but the calculations indicate that ionic lattice stabilization may make condensed-phase fluoride chemistry of Pr^{5+} feasible.

== Organopraseodymium compounds ==
Organopraseodymium compounds contain direct praseodymium–carbon bonds. As in other organolanthanide compounds, these bonds are strongly polarized because of the electropositive character of the metal, making σ-bonded alkyl and aryl compounds highly reactive toward air and moisture. Cyclopentadienyl ligands are particularly important because their delocalized bonding stabilizes otherwise reactive praseodymium centres. Both Pr^{3+} and Pr^{2+} organometallic compounds are known.

=== Cyclopentadienyl complexes ===
Structure of Pr(C_{5}H_{5})_{3}.

Tris(cyclopentadienyl)praseodymium, Pr(C_{5}H_{5})_{3}, was among the first rare-earth cyclopentadienyl compounds, being reported by Geoffrey Wilkinson and J. M. Birmingham in 1954. It can be prepared by salt metathesis between sodium cyclopentadienide and anhydrous PrCl_{3},

3 NaC_{5}H_{5} + PrCl_{3} → Pr(C_{5}H_{5})_{3} + 3 NaCl

and related substituted cyclopentadienyl complexes have subsequently become important starting materials in organopraseodymium chemistry.

Reduction of suitably substituted tris(cyclopentadienyl) Pr^{3+} complexes has also allowed isolation of molecular Pr^{2+} compounds. For example, reduction of Cp''_{3}Pr, where Cp'' is 1,3-bis(trimethylsilyl)cyclopentadienyl, with potassium graphite in the presence of [2.2.2]Cryptand gives the crystallographically characterized salt [K(crypt)][Cp''_{3}Pr]. Similar Pr^{2+} compounds can be stabilized by mono(trimethylsilyl)- or tetramethyl-substituted cyclopentadienyl ligands. These compounds demonstrate that the +2 oxidation state of praseodymium can be stabilized in molecular organometallic systems despite Pr^{3+} being overwhelmingly favoured in conventional chemistry.

=== σ-Bonded complexes ===
Direct Pr–C σ bonds are also found in alkyl compounds. Classical examples include [PrMe_{6}]^{3−} and the sterically protected alkyl Pr[CH(SiMe_{3})_{2}]_{3}. More elaborate methyl complexes can be stabilized by additional donor ligands. Reaction of praseodymium tetramethylaluminate, Pr(AlMe_{4})_{3}, with crown ethers gives cationic compounds containing genuine Pr–CH_{3} bonds; structurally characterized examples include [PrMe(^{−}_{12}crown^{−}_{4})_{2}]^{2+} and [PrMe(^{−}_{18}crown^{−}_{6})(THF)_{2}]^{2+}. The combination of strongly ionic Pr–C bonding with bulky or chelating ligands allows such compounds to be isolated despite the generally high reactivity of simple rare-earth alkyls.

== Alloys and intermetallic compounds ==
=== Didymium ===
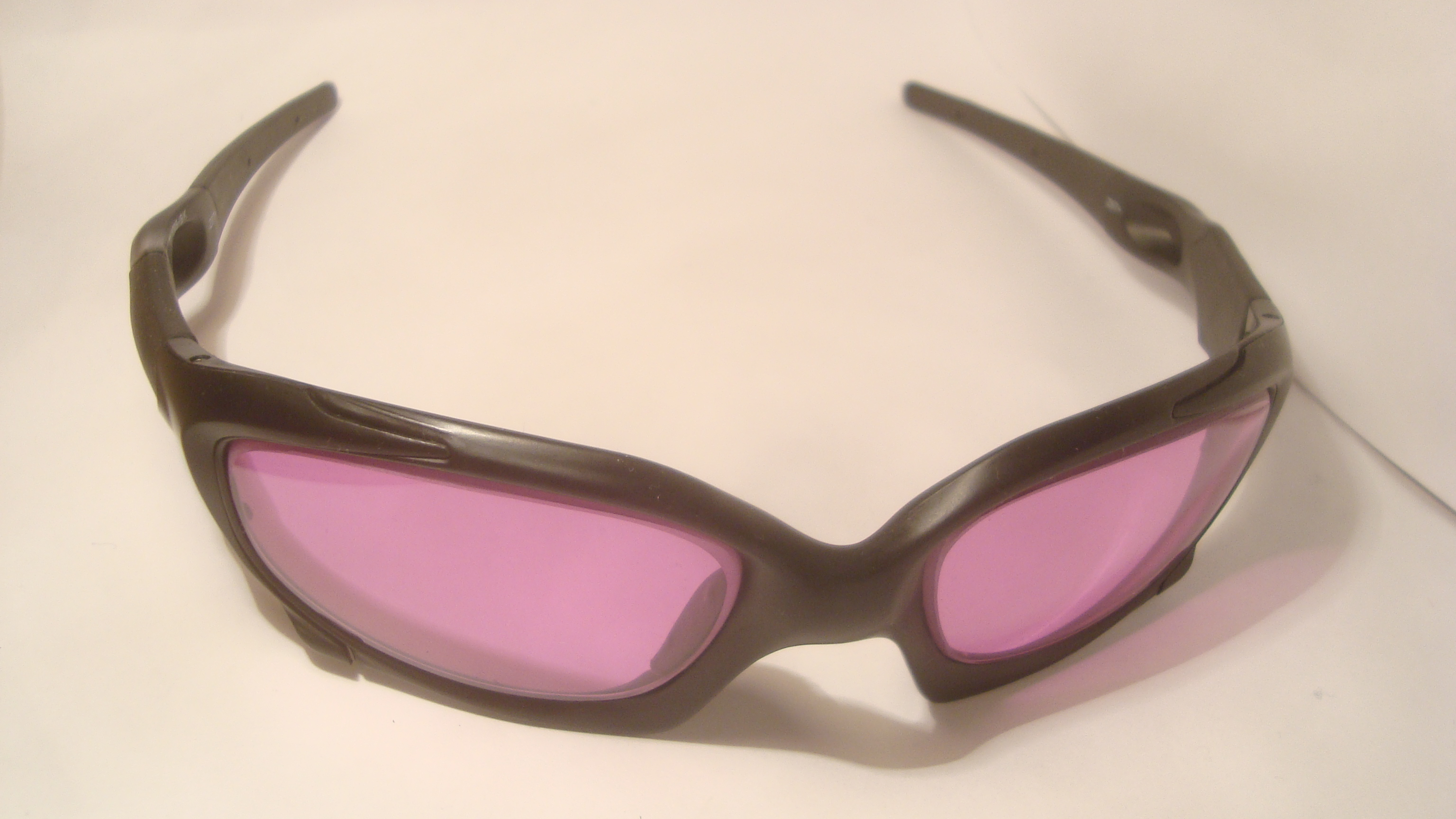
Didymium glasses

Didymium is the traditional name for mixtures containing principally praseodymium and neodymium. It was originally regarded as a single element before being separated into its principal components in the late nineteenth century, but the name remains in use for Pr–Nd mixtures and materials derived from them. Didymium-containing glass is used for protective eyewear in glassworking because the combined absorption bands of praseodymium and neodymium strongly suppress the intense yellow-orange sodium emission produced by hot glass, while transmitting much of the remainder of the visible spectrum.

=== Praseodymium–nickel intermetallics ===
The best-known praseodymium–nickel intermetallic is PrNi_{5}, which crystallizes in the hexagonal CaCu_{5} structure type. Its low-temperature magnetism is dominated not by conventional long-range magnetic ordering but by crystal-field effects on Pr^{3+}. Measurements of heat capacity, magnetic susceptibility and electrical resistivity from 2 to 300 K show a broad maximum in the magnetization near 16 K without the λ-type heat-capacity anomaly expected for a magnetic phase transition; this behaviour is instead attributed to Van Vleck paramagnetism, with the Pr^{3+} crystal-field ground state being a singlet. The weak electronic magnetism and strong hyperfine enhancement of the praseodymium nuclei make PrNi_{5} useful for extremely low-temperature refrigeration: hyperfine-enhanced nuclear adiabatic demagnetization experiments have cooled it to the millikelvin range.

=== Praseodymium–cobalt intermetallics ===
PrCo_{5} is a hexagonal CaCu_{5}-type intermetallic and a strongly anisotropic ferromagnet. At room temperature it has an anisotropy field of about 145 kOe and a saturation induction of about 12.4 kG, while its Curie temperature is approximately 905 K. These intrinsic properties give PrCo_{5} considerable potential as a high-energy permanent-magnet material; its theoretical maximum energy product is about 39 MGOe, greater than that of SmCo_{5}, although praseodymium-based RCo_{5} magnets have historically been much less commercially important than samarium–cobalt magnets. Processing strongly influences its useful magnetic properties: nanocrystalline PrCo_{5} prepared by mechanical milling and brief annealing retains the CaCu_{5} structure and can develop coercivities above 1 MA/m, with the enhanced remanence attributed to exchange coupling between nanoscale crystallites.

Another important cobalt-rich phase is Pr_{2}Co_{17}. Its magnetic behaviour reflects competing contributions from the praseodymium and cobalt sublattices, giving strong temperature-dependent anisotropy and, in suitably substituted materials, spin-reorientation transitions. Substitution on the cobalt sublattice has therefore been widely investigated as a way of tuning these properties. In Pr_{2}Co^{−}_{17}xAlx, for example, increasing aluminium content reverses the cobalt-sublattice anisotropy from easy-plane to easy-axis and lowers both the Curie temperature and spin-reorientation temperature, while silicon substitution similarly modifies the anisotropy and can induce spin-reorientation transitions above room temperature.

== Applications ==
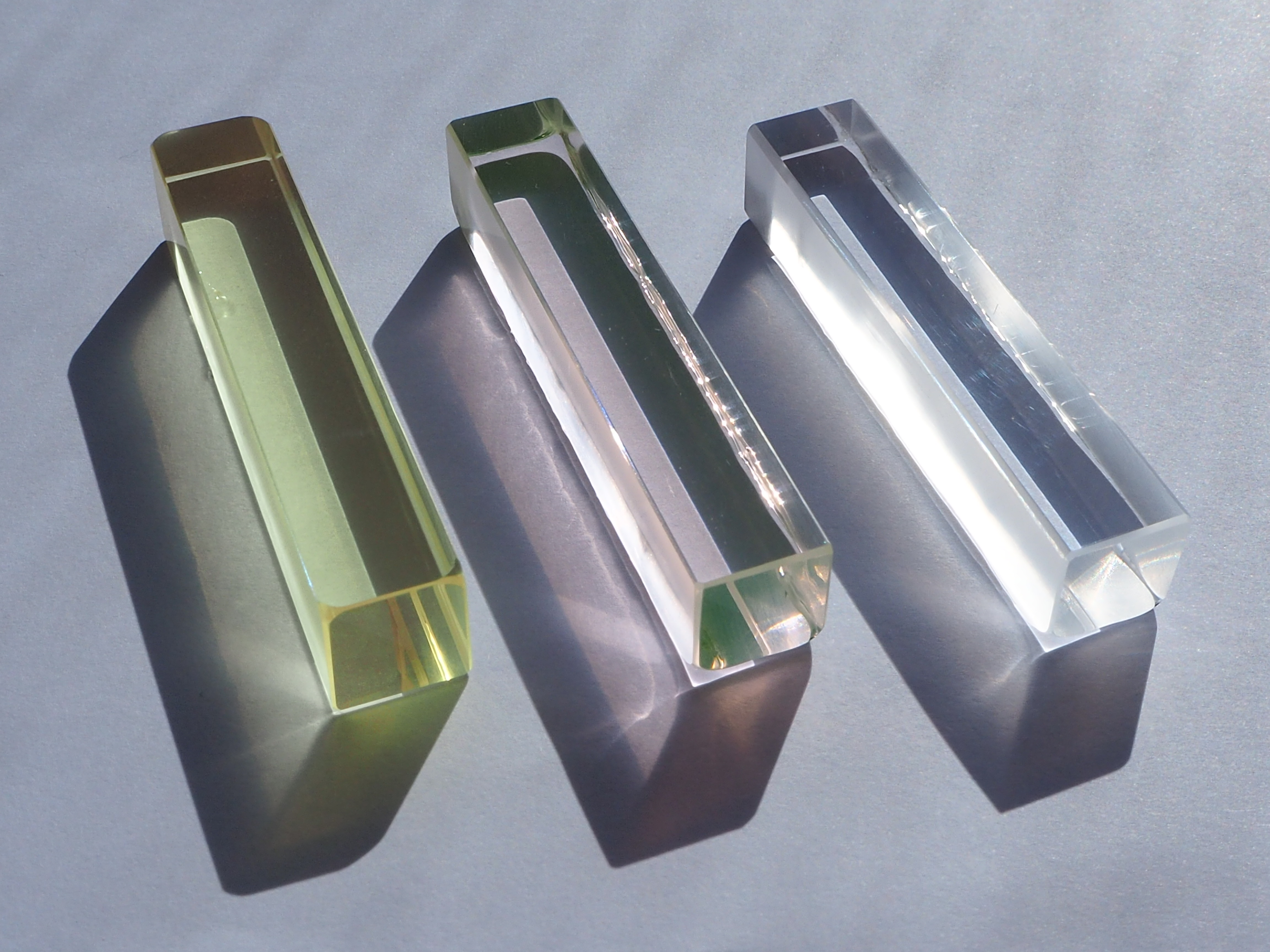
ZBLAN glass samples doped with praseodymium (left) and erbium (centre), alongside undoped glass (right).

Praseodymium compounds are used in optical materials because of the characteristic electronic transitions of Pr^{3+}. In particular, Pr^{3+}-doped fluoride glasses and optical fibres were developed as gain media for amplification in the 1.3 μm telecommunications band. A Pr^{3+}-doped fluoride fibre amplifier operating at 1.31 μm was demonstrated in 1991, establishing praseodymium-doped fluoride glass as a practical amplifier medium for the second optical-communication window. Praseodymium-doped fluoride fibres were also developed as lasers near 1.3 μm; in 1994, a Pr^{3+}-doped fluoride fibre laser was demonstrated to generate femtosecond pulses at this wavelength.

Praseodymium is also an important colourant in ceramic materials. Praseodymium-doped zircon, Pr–ZrSiO_{4}, is a commercially important yellow ceramic pigment valued for its bright colour, high-temperature durability and chemical stability. It is widely used in the decoration of porcelain, ceramic tiles and sanitary ware. The colour originates from praseodymium incorporated into the zircon lattice, and the optical properties depend on its oxidation state, concentration and distribution within the pigment particles.

The reversible Pr^{3+}/Pr^{4+} redox chemistry and high lattice-oxygen mobility of praseodymium oxides make them useful catalytic materials. Nanostructured Pr_{6}O_{11}, for example, catalyses the oxidation of carbon monoxide to carbon dioxide; samples prepared by several synthetic routes reached approximately 95–96% CO conversion near 550 °C, with activity at lower temperatures influenced by crystallite size and oxygen-ion mobility. Pr_{6}O_{11} has also been investigated as an electrocatalytic and oxygen-electrode material because of its mixed electronic–ionic transport. Nanorod electrodes show increasing conductivity and decreasing impedance at elevated temperature.

Praseodymium(III) oxide, Pr_{2}O_{3}, has been investigated as a high-k dielectric for microelectronic devices. Epitaxial Pr_{2}O_{3} films can be grown directly on silicon and show dielectric constants around 30 together with very low leakage-current densities, making them candidates for replacement gate dielectrics in highly scaled silicon devices. Subsequent work confirmed epitaxial growth of crystalline Pr_{2}O_{3} on Si(001) and Si(111), although oxidation and interfacial reactions can affect the stability of the dielectric films.

== Gallery ==
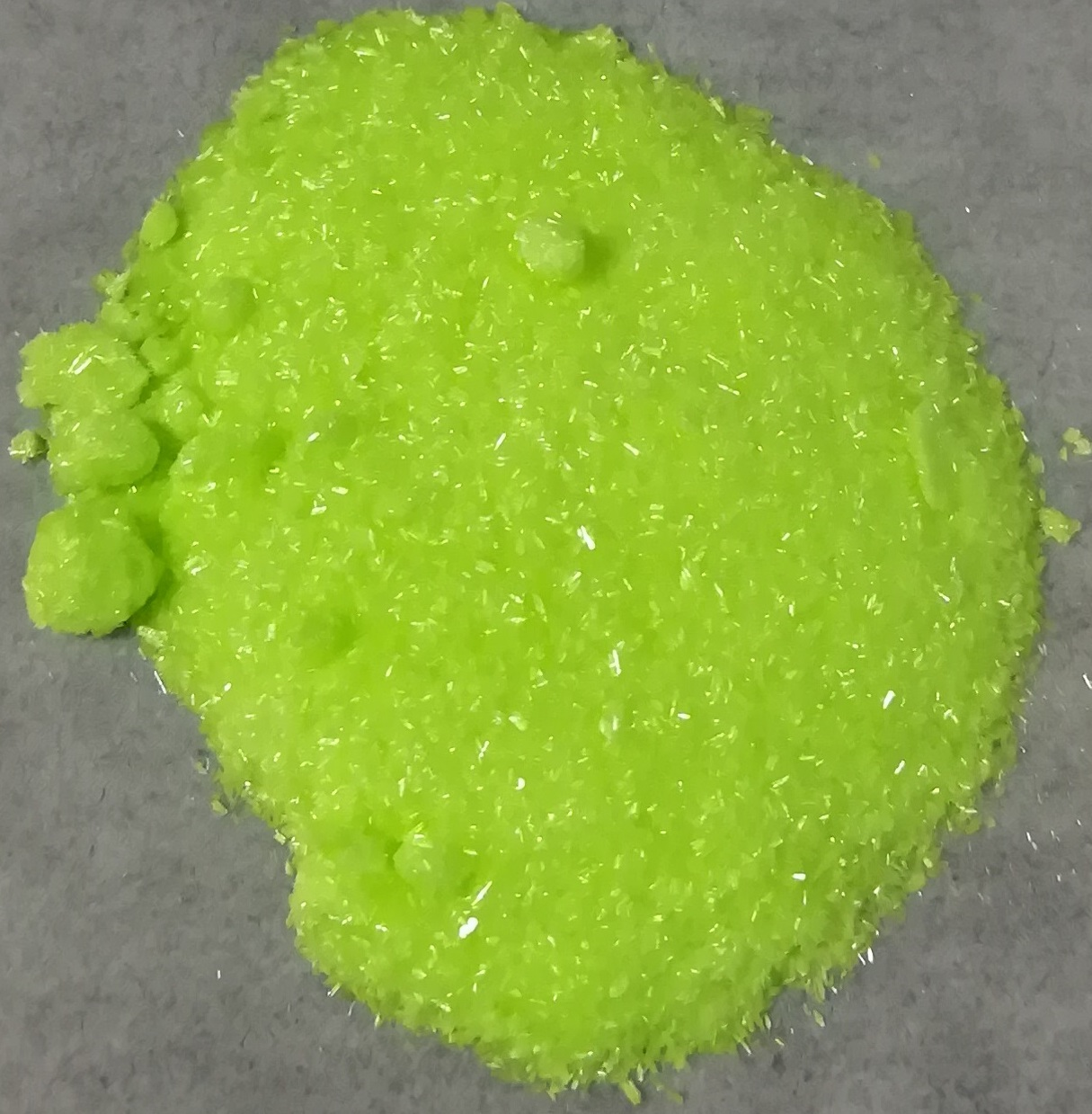
Praseodymium(III) acetate (Pr(CH_{3}COO)_{3})

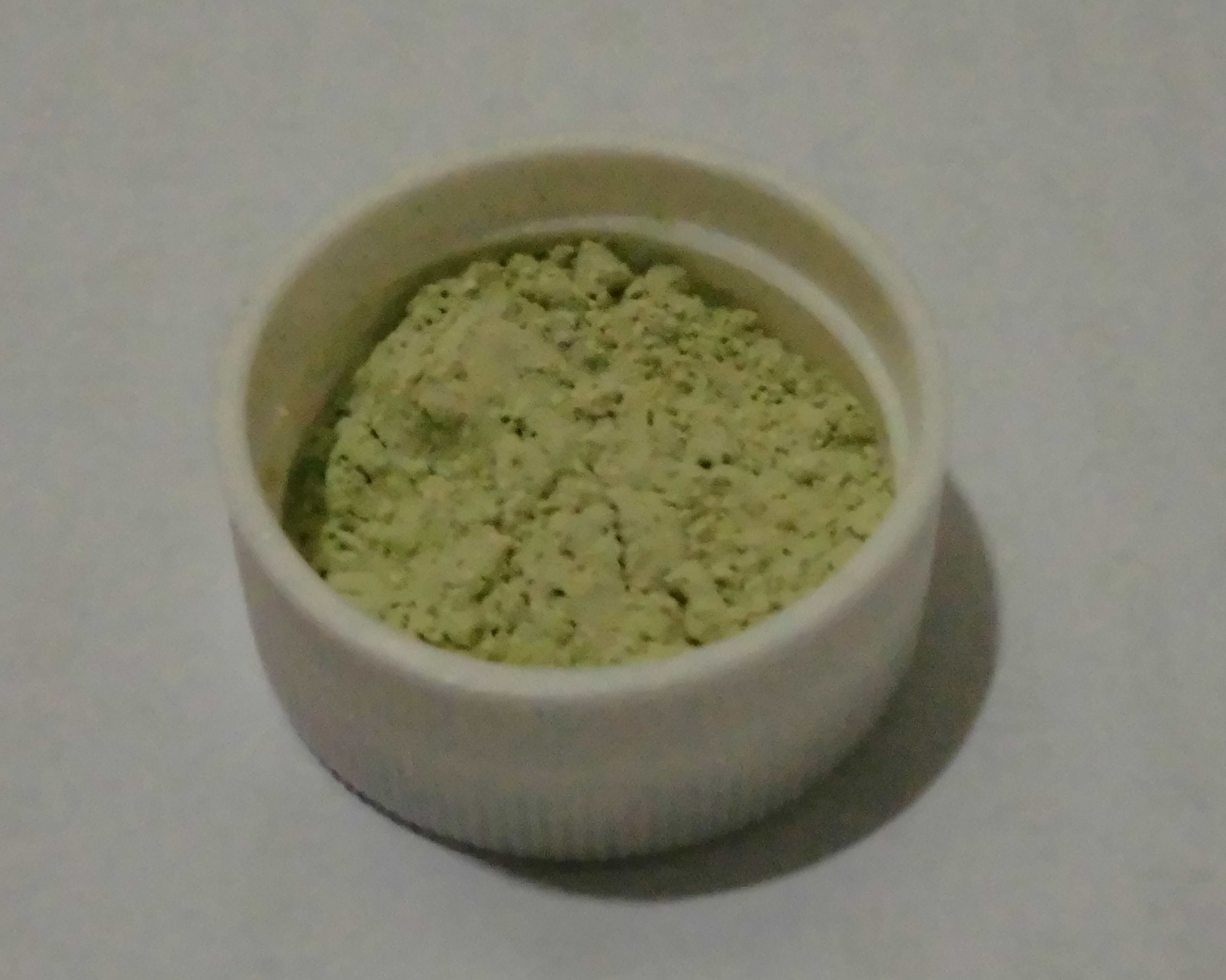
Praseodymium(III) oxide (Pr_{2}O_{3})

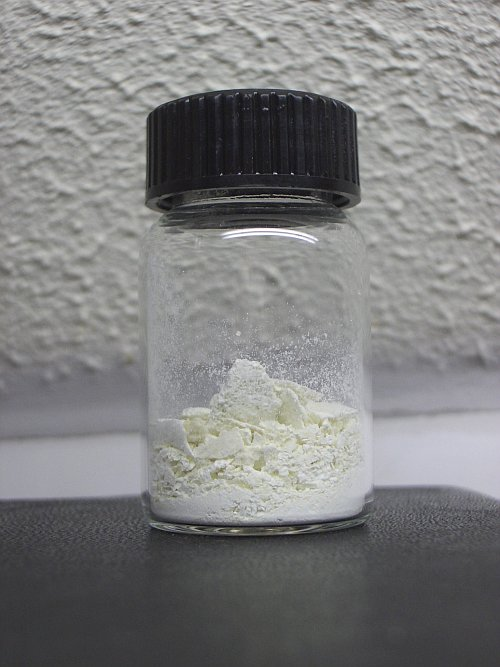
Praseodymium(III) chloride (PrCl_{3})

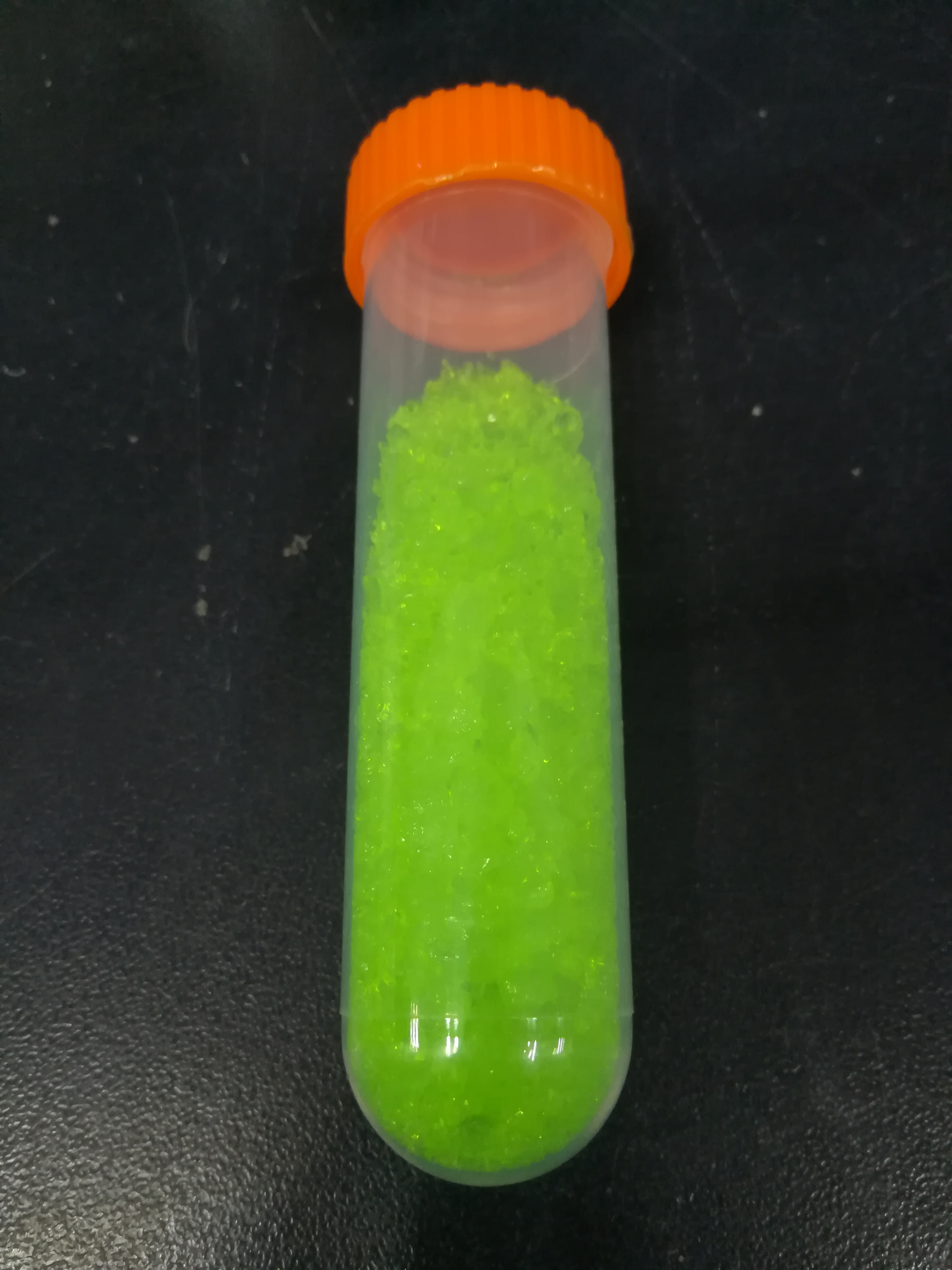
Praseodymium(III) nitrate (Pr(NO_{3})_{3})

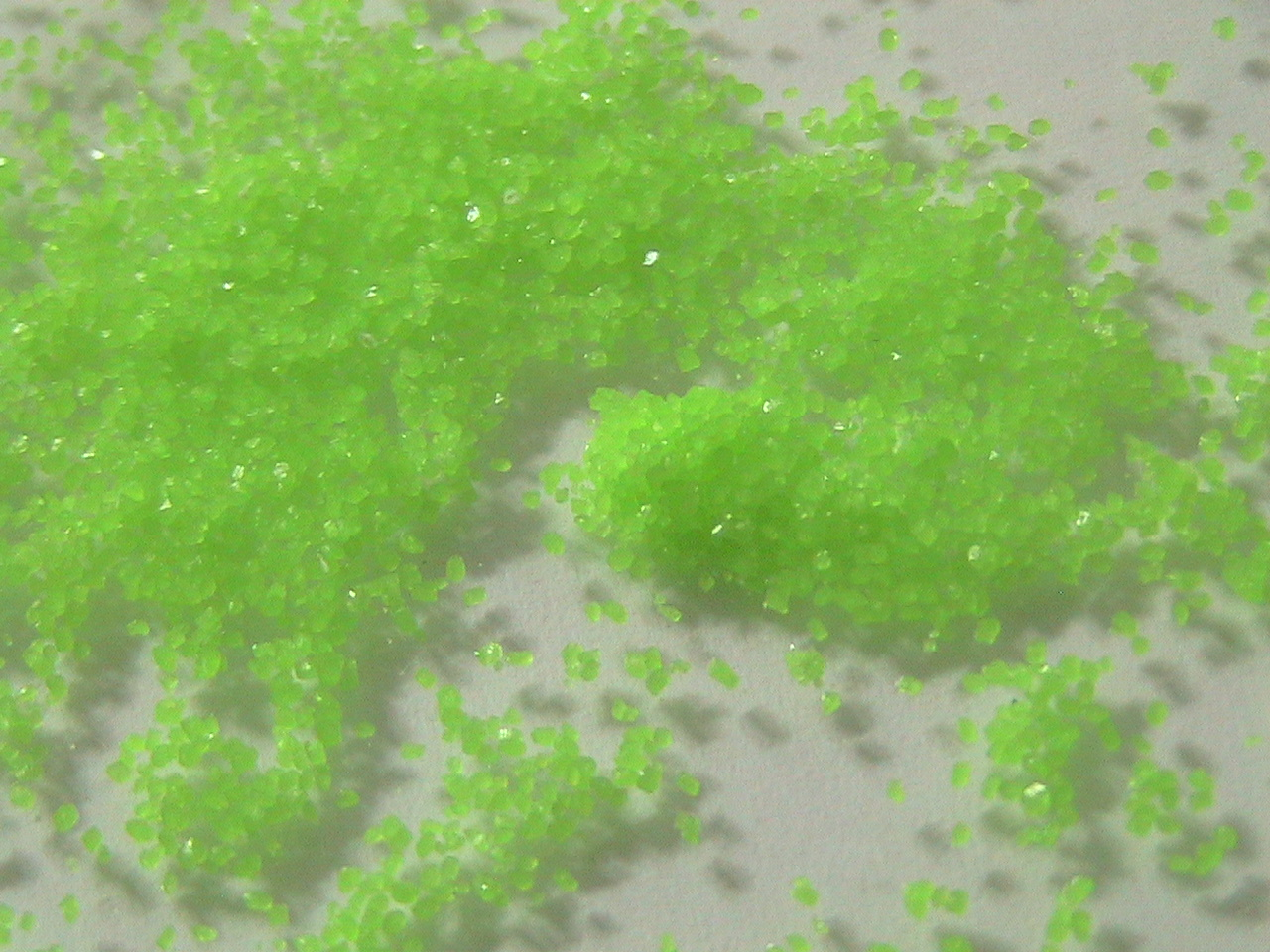
Praseodymium(III) sulfate octahydrate (Pr_{2}(SO_{4})_{3}·8H_{2}O)

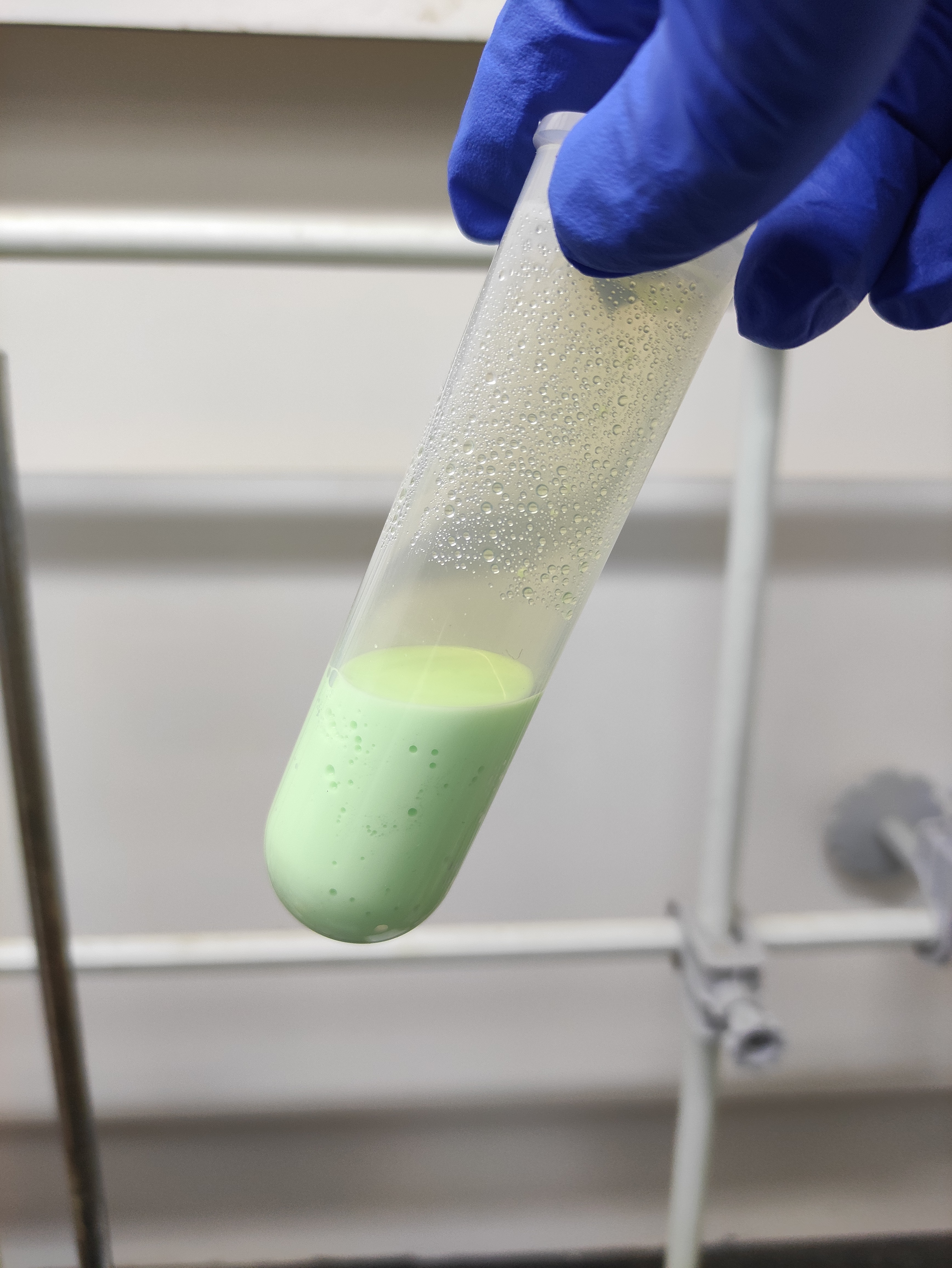
Praseodymium(III) phosphate (PrPO_{4})

== See also ==
- Cerium compounds
- Neodymium compounds
- Protactinium compounds
