= Praseodymium(III) iodide =

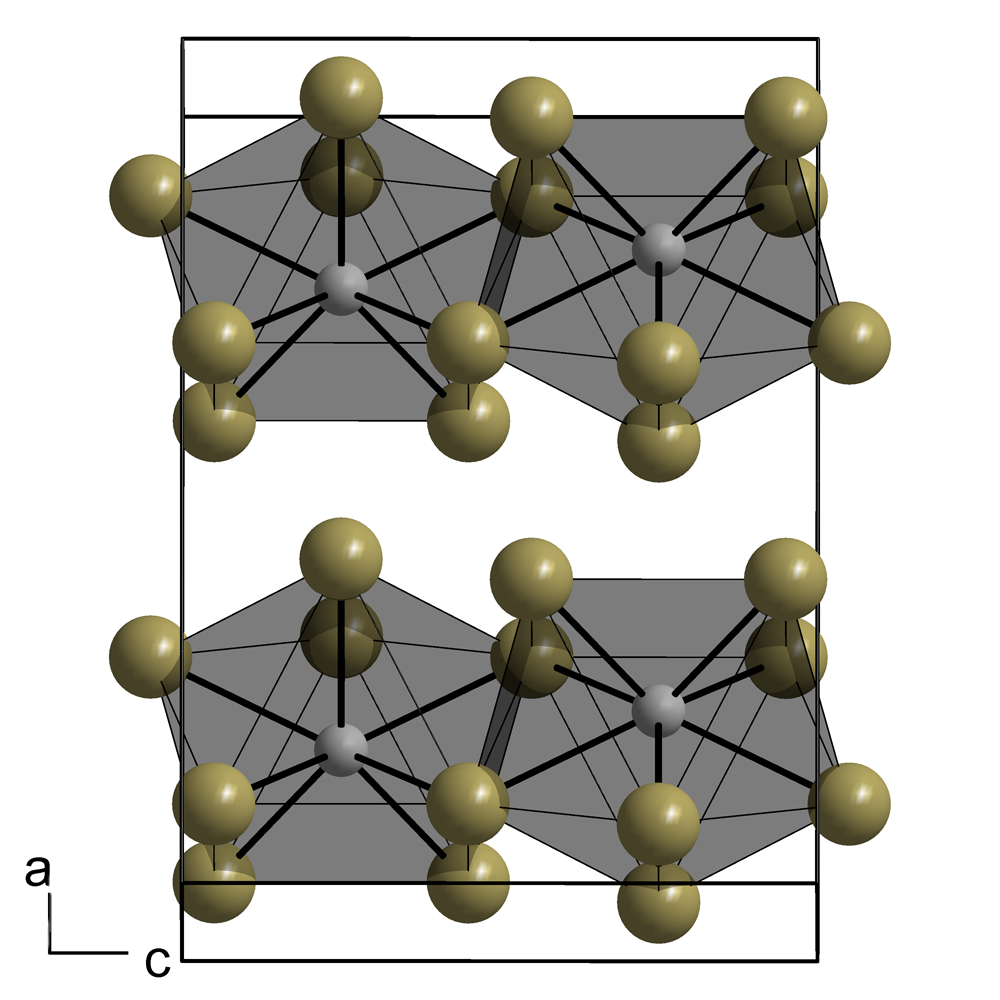

Names
- Other names Praseodymium triiodide

Identifiers
CAS Number	13813-23-5
3D model (JSmol)	Interactive image
ChemSpider	75566
ECHA InfoCard	100.034.046
EC Number	237-466-1
PubChem CID	83744
UNII	S5VBM2EKJ8
CompTox Dashboard (EPA)	DTXSID5065641
- InChI: InChI=1S/3HI.Pr/h3*1H;/q;;;+3/p-3 Key: PVEVRIVGNKNWML-UHFFFAOYSA-K
- SMILES: I[Pr](I)I

Properties
Chemical formula	PrI_{3}
Molar mass	521.619 g/mol 683.75652 g/mol (nonahydrate)
Appearance	hygroscopic green crystals
Density	5.8 g/cm^{3}
Melting point	738 °C (1,360 °F; 1,011 K)
Boiling point	1,380 °C (2,520 °F; 1,650 K)
Solubility in water	213.9 g/100 mL

Hazards
- GHS labelling
Pictograms	(GHS07: Exclamation mark) (GHS08: Health hazard)
Signal word	Danger
Hazard statements	H317, H360
Precautionary statements	P203, P261, P272, P280, P302+P352, P318, P321, P333+P313, P362+P364, P405, P501

Related compounds
Other anions	Praseodymium(III) fluoride Praseodymium(III) chloride Praseodymium(III) bromide
Other cations	Cerium(III) iodide Neodymium(III) iodide
- Except where otherwise noted, data are given for materials in their standard state (at 25 °C [77 °F], 100 kPa). Infobox references

Praseodymium(III) iodide is an inorganic salt, consisting of the rare-earth metal praseodymium and iodine, with the chemical formula PrI_{3}. It forms green crystals. It is soluble in water.

== Preparation ==
- Heating praseodymium and iodine in an inert atmosphere produces praseodymium(III) iodide:

$$\mathsf{2Pr + 3I_2 \ \xrightarrow{T}\ 2PrI_3}$$

- It can also be obtained by heating praseodymium with mercury(II) iodide:

$$\mathsf{2Pr + 3HgI_2 \ \xrightarrow{T}\ 2PrI_3 + 3Hg}$$

== Properties ==
Praseodymium(III) iodide forms green crystals, which are soluble in water. It forms orthorhombic crystals which are hygroscopic. It crystallizes in the PuBr_{3} type with space group Cmcm (No. 63) with a = 4.3281(6) Å, b = 14.003(6) Å and c = 9.988(3) Å. It decomposes through an intermediate phase 2 PrI_{3}·PrOI to a mixture of praseodymium oxyiodide and praseodymium oxide (5 PrOI·Pr_{2}O_{3}).

=== Reactions ===
- PrI_{3} forms compounds with hydrazine, like I_{3}Pr·3N_{2}H_{4}·4H_{2}O which has pale yellow crystals and soluble in methanol, slightly soluble in water, and insoluble in benzene, d_{20 °C} = 2.986 g/cm^{3}.
- PrI_{3} forms compounds with urea, like I_{3}Pr·5CO(NH_{2})_{2} which has pale green crystals.
- PrI_{3} forms compounds with thiourea, like I_{3}Pr·2CS(NH_{2})_{2}·9H_{2}O which is a green crystal with d = 2.27 g/cm^{3}.
- Praseodymium(III) iodide forms a nonahydrate, PrI_{3}·9H_{2}O. It can be obtained by dissolving praseodymium(III) oxide in concentrated aqueous hydroiodic acid:

Pr_{2}O_{3} + 6 HI + 15H_{2}O → 2 PrI_{3}·9H_{2}O

- It adopts the same structure as other light rare earth iodides (La–Ho) and contains a triangular tricapped prismatic nonaaqua ion [Pr(OH_{2})_{9}]^{3+} and iodide counterions.
- Praseodymium(III) iodide reacts with praseodymium metal at elevated temperatures to form praseodymium diiodide:

2 PrI_{3} + Pr → 3 PrI_{2}

== See also ==
- Praseodymium diiodide
- Praseodymium compounds
