= Praseodymium(III) iodate =

Identifiers
CAS Number	14945-15-4 anhydrous; 56491-63-5 monohydrate; 56491-62-4 pentahydrate
3D model (JSmol)	Interactive image
ChemSpider	20082428
EC Number	239-021-7
PubChem CID	21149368
CompTox Dashboard (EPA)	DTXSID80164270
- InChI: InChI=1S/3HIO3.Pr/c3*2-1(3)4;/h3*(H,2,3,4);/q;;;+3/p-3 Key: CIFGBMZYGQOOKC-UHFFFAOYSA-K
- SMILES: [O-]I(=O)=O.[O-]I(=O)=O.[O-]I(=O)=O.[Pr+3]

Properties
Chemical formula	Pr(IO_{3})_{3}
Molar mass	665.62
Density	4.89 g·cm^{−3} (pentahydrate)
- Except where otherwise noted, data are given for materials in their standard state (at 25 °C [77 °F], 100 kPa). Infobox references

Praseodymium(III) iodate is an inorganic compound with the chemical formula Pr(IO_{3})_{3}.

== Preparation ==
Praseodymium(III) iodate can be obtained by reacting praseodymium(III) nitrate and potassium iodate in a hot aqueous solution:

Pr(NO_{3})_{3} + 3 KIO_{3} → Pr(IO_{3})_{3} + 3 KNO_{3}

== Properties ==
Praseodymium(III) iodate can be thermally decomposed as follows:

7 Pr(IO_{3})_{3} → Pr_{5}(IO_{6})_{3} + Pr_{2}O_{3} + 9 I_{2} + 21 O_{2}
