= Praseodymium oxyiodide =

Names
- Other names Praseodymium oxide iodide

Identifiers
3D model (JSmol)	Interactive image
- InChI: InChI=1S/HI.O.Pr/h1H;;/q;-2;+3/p-1 Key: OUGSUJMGINWFDI-UHFFFAOYSA-M
- SMILES: [I-].[O-2].[Pr+3]

Properties
Chemical formula	PrOI
Molar mass	283.811 g/mol
Density	5.46 g/cm^{3}
- Except where otherwise noted, data are given for materials in their standard state (at 25 °C [77 °F], 100 kPa). Infobox references

Praseodymium oxyiodide or praseodymium oxide iodide is an inorganic compound of praseodymium, oxygen, and iodine with the chemical formula PrOI.

== Synthesis ==
PrOI can be synthesized by reacting praseodymium triiodide (PrI_{3}) with oxygen at a controlled partial pressure.

Alternatively, PrOI can form as a decomposition product of praseodymium diiodide PrI_{2} in the presence of moisture, or through the reaction of PrI_{3} with praseodymium oxide (Pr_{2}O_{3}).

2 PrI_{2} + 2 H_{2}O → 2 PrOI + H_{2}↑ + 2 HI
