= Praseodymium oxide =

Praseodymium oxide may refer to:

- Praseodymium(III) oxide (dipraseodymium trioxide), Pr_{2}O_{3}
- Praseodymium(III,IV) oxide, Pr_{6}O_{11}
- Praseodymium(IV) oxide (praseodymium dioxide), PrO_{2}

== See also ==
- Praseodymium compounds#Oxides
