= Praseodymium(III) acetate =

Compound of praseodymium

Praseodymium acetate
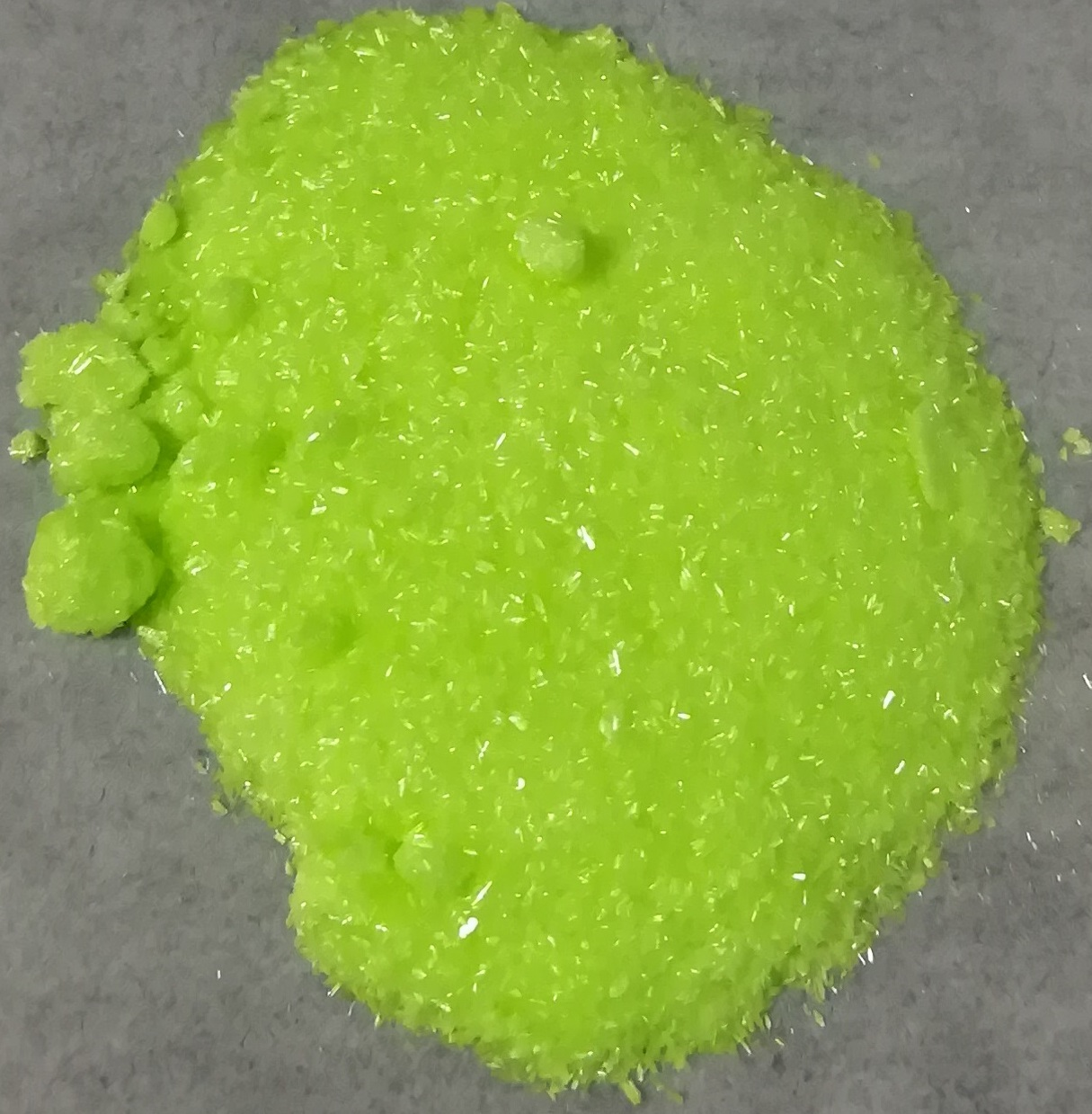
- Neodymium acetate

Names
- IUPAC names Tetra-μ^{2}-acetatodiaquadipraseodymium(III) praseodymium (3+) triacetate
- Other names Praseodymium ethanoate

Identifiers
CAS Number	6192-12-7
3D model (JSmol)	Interactive image
ChEBI	CHEBI:63078
ChemSpider	145010
ECHA InfoCard	100.025.676
EC Number	228-242-4
PubChem CID	165418
CompTox Dashboard (EPA)	DTXSID50890615
- InChI: InChI=1S/3C2H4O2.Pr/c3*1-2(3)4;/h3*1H3,(H,3,4);/q;;;+3/p-3 Key: KPXRPRLCONABEG-UHFFFAOYSA-K
- SMILES: [Pr+3].O=C([O-])C.[O-]C(=O)C.[O-]C(=O)C

Properties
Chemical formula	Pr(O_{2}C_{2}H_{3})_{3}
Appearance	Green solid

Hazards
- GHS labelling
Pictograms	(GHS07: Exclamation mark)
Signal word	Warning
Hazard statements	H315, H319, H335
Precautionary statements	P261, P264, P264+P265, P271, P280, P302+P352, P304+P340, P305+P351+P338, P319, P321, P332+P317, P337+P317, P362+P364, P403+P233, P405, P501
- Except where otherwise noted, data are given for materials in their standard state (at 25 °C [77 °F], 100 kPa). verify (what is ?) Infobox references

Praseodymium(III) acetate is an inorganic salt composed of a Praseodymium atom trication and three acetate groups as anions. This compound commonly forms the dihydrate, Pr(O_{2}C_{2}H_{3})_{3}·2H_{2}O.

== Preparation ==
Praseodymium(III) acetate can be formed by the reaction of acetic acid and praseodymium(III) oxide at elevated temperatures:

6 CH_{3}COOH + Pr_{2}O_{3} → 2 Pr(CH_{3}COO)_{3} + 3 H_{2}O

== Structure ==
According to X-ray crystallography, anhydrous praseodymium acetate is a coordination polymer. Each Pr(III) center is nine-coordinate, with two bidentate acetate ligands and the remaining sites occupied by oxygens provided by bridging acetate ligands. The lanthanum and holmium compounds are isostructural.

== Decomposition ==
When the dihydrate is heated, it decomposes to the anhydrous form, which then decomposes into praseodymium(III) oxyacetate (PrO(CH_{3}COO)) then to praseodymium(III) oxycarbonate, and at last to praseodymium(III) oxide.

== See also ==
- Neodymium acetate
- Praseodymium
- Acetic acid
- Lanthanide
