= Praseodymium(III) sulfate =

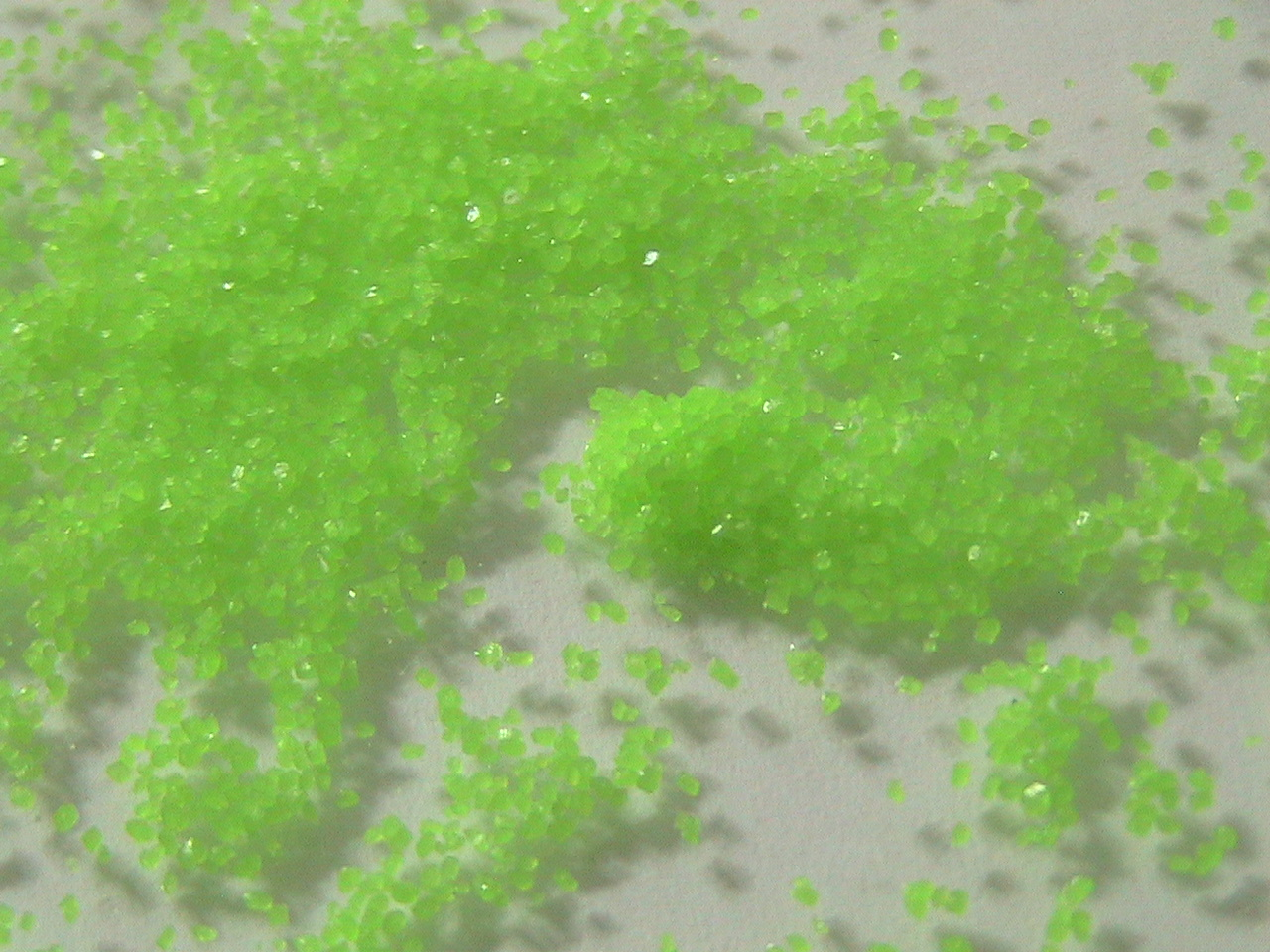
- Praseodymium sulfate octahydrate

Names
- IUPAC name praseodymium(3+); trisulfate
- Other names Praseodymium sulphate, dipraseodymium trisulphate, praseodymium(III) sulfate

Identifiers
CAS Number	10277-44-8; 13510-41-3 (octahydrate)
3D model (JSmol)	Interactive image
ChemSpider	145346
ECHA InfoCard	100.030.553
EC Number	233-622-8
PubChem CID	165851; 25022097 (octahydrate)
CompTox Dashboard (EPA)	DTXSID70890652
- InChI: InChI=1S/3H2O4S.2Pr/c3*1-5(2,3)4;;/h3*(H2,1,2,3,4);;/q;;;2*+3/p-6 Key: HWZAHTVZMSRSJE-UHFFFAOYSA-H; InChI=1S/3H2O4S.8H2O.2Pr/c3*1-5(2,3)4;;;;;;;;;;/h3*(H2,1,2,3, 4);8*1H2;;/q;;;;;;;;;;;2*+3/p-6 (octahydrate) Key: IJXLQIGVGZNKP-UHFFFAOYSA-H (octahyrate)
- SMILES: [O-]S(=O)(=O)[O-].[O-]S(=O)(=O)[O-].[O-]S(=O)(=O)[O-].[Pr+3].[Pr+3]; O.O.O.O.O.O.O.O.[O-]S(=O)(=O)[O-].[O-]S(=O)(=O)[O-].[O-]S(=O)(=O)[O-]. [Pr+3].[Pr+3] (octahyrate)

Properties
Chemical formula	Pr_{2}(SO_{4})_{3} Pr_{2}(SO_{4})_{3}·nH_{2}O, n=2,5,8
Molar mass	570.0031 g/mol 714.12534 g/mol (octahydrate)
Appearance	green crystalline solid
Density	3.72 g/cm^{3}
Melting point	1,010 °C (1,850 °F; 1,280 K) (decomposes)
Solubility in water	113.0 g/L (20 °C); 108.8 g/L (25 °C)
Magnetic susceptibility (χ)	+9660·10^{−6} cm^{3}/mol

Hazards
- GHS labelling
Pictograms	(GHS07: Exclamation mark)
Signal word	Warning
Hazard statements	H315, H319, H335
Precautionary statements	P261, P264, P271, P280, P302+P352, P304+P340, P305+P351+P338, P312, P321, P332+P313, P337+P313, P362, P403+P233, P405, P501
Flash point	Non-flammable

Related compounds
Other anions	Praseodymium carbonate Praseodymium chloride
Other cations	Neodymium sulfate
Related compounds	Praseodymium(III) oxide Praseodymium(III) sulfide
- Except where otherwise noted, data are given for materials in their standard state (at 25 °C [77 °F], 100 kPa). verify (what is ?) Infobox references

Praseodymium(III) sulfate is a praseodymium compound with formula Pr_{2}(SO_{4})_{3}. It is an odourless whitish-green crystalline salt. The anhydrous substance readily absorbs water forming pentahydrate and octahydrate.

== Properties ==
Praseodymium sulfate is stable under standard conditions. At elevated temperatures, it gradually loses water and becomes more whitish. Like all rare earth sulfates, its solubility decreases with temperature, a property once used to separate it from other, non-rare earth compounds.

Pentahydrate and octahydrate have monoclinic crystal structures with densities of 3.713 and 2.813 g/cm^{3}, respectively. The octahydrate crystals are optically biaxial, with refractive index components of n_{α} = 1.5399, n_{β} = 1.5494 and n_{γ} = 1.5607. They belong to the space group C12/c1 (No. 15) and have lattice constants a = 1370.0(2) pm, b = 686.1(1) pm, c = 1845.3(2) pm, β = 102.80(1)° and Z = 4.

== Synthesis ==
Crystals of octahydrate can be grown from solution obtained by dissolving wet Pr_{2}O_{3} powder with sulfuric acid. This procedure can be optimised by adding a few evaporation/dissolution steps involving organic chemicals.
