= Tris(cyclopentadienyl)praseodymium =

Names
- Other names: Tricyclopentadienylpraseodymium; Praseodymium tris(cyclopentadienide)

Identifiers
CAS Number	11077-59-1
3D model (JSmol)	Interactive image
ChemSpider	74693
ECHA InfoCard	100.031.168
EC Number	234-298-0
PubChem CID	82769
CompTox Dashboard (EPA)	DTXSID30911857
- InChI: InChI=1S/3C5H5.Pr/c3*1-2-4-5-3-1;/h3*1-5H;/q3*-1;+3 Key: CTHYOYODNXUAHW-UHFFFAOYSA-N
- SMILES: [CH-]1C=CC=C1.[CH-]1C=CC=C1.[CH-]1C=CC=C1.[Pr+3]

Properties
Chemical formula	Pr(C_{5}H_{5})_{3}
Molar mass	336.19 g/mol
Appearance	Pale green crystalline solid

Structure
Crystal structure	Monoclinic
Space group	P2_{1}, No. 4
Lattice constant	a = 0.8314 nm, b = 0.9714 nm, c = 0.8372 nm α = 90°, β = 116.06°, γ = 90°
- Except where otherwise noted, data are given for materials in their standard state (at 25 °C [77 °F], 100 kPa). Infobox references

Tris(cyclopentadienyl)praseodymium is an organopraseodymium compound with the formula Pr(C_{5}H_{5})_{3}, commonly abbreviated PrCp_{3}. It is a pale-green organometallic solid containing praseodymium in the +3 oxidation state and three cyclopentadienyl ligands. In the solid state it forms a polymeric chain structure rather than discrete PrCp_{3} molecules.

== Preparation ==
Tris(cyclopentadienyl)praseodymium was among the first organolanthanide cyclopentadienyl compounds reported by Wilkinson and Birmingham in 1954.

It can be prepared by reacting anhydrous praseodymium(III) chloride with sodium cyclopentadienide in tetrahydrofuran:

PrCl_{3} + 3 NaC_{5}H_{5} → Pr(C_{5}H_{5})_{3} + 3 NaCl

The crude product commonly contains coordinated THF and can be purified by sublimation under high vacuum. Preparative and spectroscopic studies have used sublimation at about 200–250 °C under pressures of approximately 10^{−2}–10^{−4} mmHg.

== Properties ==
=== Structure and bonding ===
Sublimed PrCp_{3} crystallizes in the monoclinic space group P2_{1}, with lattice parameters a = 8.314 Å, b = 9.714 Å, c = 8.372 Å and β = 116.06°. The solid forms polymeric chains. Each Pr^{3+} ion is η^{5}-coordinated by three nearby cyclopentadienyl ligands, while one of these Cp rings additionally bridges to a neighboring praseodymium ion through η^{2} coordination. This gives a formal coordination number of 11 around praseodymium. This behaviour reflects the large ionic radius and high preferred coordination number of early lanthanides. The bonding in lanthanide cyclopentadienyl complexes is substantially more ionic than in many transition-metal metallocenes, although covalent contributions from metal–ligand orbital interactions are also present.

=== Volatility and thermal behaviour ===
PrCp_{3} is sufficiently volatile to be purified by vacuum sublimation. Thermochemical measurements give a standard enthalpy of sublimation of about 125.5 kJ mol^{−1} near room temperature. The compound melts only at high temperature and begins to decompose on melting. Reported melting/decomposition temperatures are around 420–430 °C, while sublimation is practical at much lower temperature under vacuum.

=== Electronic properties ===
Photoelectron spectroscopy of gaseous PrCp_{3} has been used to investigate the electronic structure of the lanthanide–cyclopentadienyl bond. The spectra show ionizations associated with the cyclopentadienyl π orbitals together with localized Pr 4f-derived states. Comparison across Pr, Nd and Sm tris(cyclopentadienyl) complexes shows that the ligand-based ionization energies change relatively little across the series, while the 4f states shift more substantially.

== Coordination chemistry ==
PrCp_{3} acts as a Lewis-acidic organolanthanide fragment and can form adducts with donor ligands. For example, THF adducts of the type PrCp_{3}(THF) are known, and related tris(cyclopentadienyl)lanthanide complexes form adducts with nitriles and isocyanides. PrCp_{3} can also participate in formation of anionic cyclopentadienyl complexes. In the presence of 1,10-phenanthroline, reaction of PrCl_{3} with sodium cyclopentadienide gives the ion-pair complex [Na(phen)_{3}][Pr(C_{5}H_{5})_{3}Cl]·phen.
