= Praseodymium(III) phosphate =

Identifiers
CAS Number	14298-31-8
3D model (JSmol)	Interactive image
ChemSpider	2341292
ECHA InfoCard	100.034.740
EC Number	238-231-6
PubChem CID	3084189
CompTox Dashboard (EPA)	DTXSID90162267
- InChI: InChI=1S/H3O4P.Pr/c1-5(2,3)4;/h(H3,1,2,3,4);/q;+3/p-3 Key: KDCUNMWWJBHRSC-UHFFFAOYSA-K
- SMILES: [O-]P(=O)([O-])[O-].[Pr+3]

Properties
Chemical formula	O_{4}PPr
Molar mass	235.877 g·mol^{−1}
Appearance	solid

Hazards
- GHS labelling
Pictograms	(GHS07: Exclamation mark)
Signal word	Warning
Hazard statements	H315, H319, H335
Precautionary statements	P261, P264, P264+P265, P271, P280, P302+P352, P304+P340, P305+P351+P338, P319, P321, P332+P317, P337+P317, P362+P364, P403+P233, P405, P501
- Except where otherwise noted, data are given for materials in their standard state (at 25 °C [77 °F], 100 kPa). Infobox references

Praseodymium(III) phosphate is an inorganic compound with the chemical formula PrPO_{4}.

== Preparation ==
Praseodymium(III) phosphate hemihydrate can be obtained by reacting praseodymium chloride and phosphoric acid:

PrCl_{3} + H_{3}PO_{4} → PrPO_{4} + 3 HCl

It can also be produced by reacting silicon pyrophosphate (SiP_{2}O_{7}) and praseodymium(III,IV) oxide (Pr_{6}O_{11}) at 1200 °C.

== Properties ==
Praseodymium(III) phosphate forms light green crystals in the monoclinic crystal system, with space group P2_{1}/n and cell parameters a = 0.676 nm, b = 0.695 nm, c = 0.641 nm, β = 103.25°, Z = 4.

It forms a crystal hydrate of the composition PrPO_{4}·nH_{2}O, where n < 0.5, with light green crystals of hexagonal crystal system, space group P6_{2}22, and cell parameters a = 0.700 nm, c = 0.643 nm, Z = 3.

Praseodymium(III) phosphate reacts with sodium fluoride to obtain Na_{2}PrF_{2}(PO_{4}).

PrPO_{4} + 2 NaF → Na_{2}PrF_{2}(PO_{4})
