= Praseodymium iodide =

Praseodymium iodide may refer to:

- Praseodymium diiodide, PrI_{2}
- Praseodymium(III) iodide (praseodymium triiodide), PrI_{3}
