= Praseodymium(III) fluoride =

Names
- Other names Praseodymium trifluoride

Identifiers
| CAS Number | 13709-46-1 |
| 3D model (JSmol) | Interactive image |
| ChemSpider | 75500 |
| ECHA InfoCard | 100.033.853 |
| EC Number | 237-254-9 |
| PubChem CID | 50925288 |
| UNII | X3MG2Y9URW |
| CompTox Dashboard (EPA) | DTXSID2065593 |
- InChI: InChI=1S/3FH.Pr/h3*1H;/q;;;+3/p-3 Key: BOTHRHRVFIZTGG-UHFFFAOYSA-K
- SMILES: [F-].[F-].[F-].[Pr+3]

Properties
| Chemical formula | PrF_{3} |
| Appearance | green crystalline solid |
| Density | 6.267 g·cm^{−3} |
| Melting point | 1370 °C |

Hazards
- GHS labelling
| Pictograms | (GHS06: Toxic) (GHS07: Exclamation mark) |
| Signal word | Danger |
| Hazard statements | H301, H311, H315, H319, H331, H335, H413 |
- Except where otherwise noted, data are given for materials in their standard state (at 25 °C [77 °F], 100 kPa). Infobox references

Praseodymium(III) fluoride is an inorganic compound with the formula PrF_{3}, being the most stable fluoride of praseodymium.

== Preparation ==
The reaction between praseodymium(III) nitrate and sodium fluoride will obtain praseodymium(III) fluoride as a green crystalline solid:

Pr(NO_{3})_{3} + 3 NaF → 3 NaNO_{3} + PrF_{3}

There are also literature reports on the reaction between chlorine trifluoride and various oxides of praseodymium (Pr_{2}O_{3}, Pr_{6}O_{11} and PrO_{2}), where praseodymium(III) fluoride is the only product. The reaction between bromine trifluoride and praseodymium oxide left in the air for a period of time also produces praseodymium(III) fluoride, but the reaction is incomplete; the reaction between praseodymium(III) oxalate hydrate and bromine trifluoride can obtain praseodymium(III) fluoride, and carbon is also produced from this reaction. Praseodymium(III) fluoride can also be obtained by reacting praseodymium oxide and sulfur hexafluoride at 584 °C.

== Properties ==
=== Physical ===
Praseodymium(III) fluoride forms pale green crystals of trigonal system (or hexagonal system), space group P 3c1, (or P 6/mcm), cell parameters a = 0.7078 nm, c = 0.7239 nm, Z = 6, structure like cerium(III) fluoride (CeF_{3}).

=== Chemical ===
Praseodymium(III) fluoride is a green, odourless, hygroscopic solid that is insoluble in water.

== Uses ==
Praseodymium(III) fluoride is used as a doping material for laser crystals.

== See also ==
- Praseodymium(III) chloride
- Praseodymium(IV) fluoride
