= Praseodymium diselenide =

Names
- Other names Praseodymium(III) diselenide

Identifiers
3D model (JSmol)	Interactive image
- InChI: InChI=1S/2Pr.Se2.2Se/c;;1-2;;/q2*+3;3*-2 Key: CSMTWWRMXIQOKD-UHFFFAOYSA-N
- SMILES: [Pr+3].[Pr+3].[Se-2].[Se-2].[Se-][Se-]

Properties
Chemical formula	PrSe_{2}
Molar mass	298.83 g/mol

Structure
Crystal structure	Monoclinic, CeSe_{2} type
Space group	P2_{1}/a
Lattice constant	a = 0.8396 nm, b = 0.4184 nm, c = 0.8431 nm α = 90°, β = 90.08°, γ = 90°
Formula units (Z)	4
- Except where otherwise noted, data are given for materials in their standard state (at 25 °C [77 °F], 100 kPa). Infobox references

Praseodymium diselenide is an inorganic compound of praseodymium and selenium with the formula PrSe_{2}. It is a rare-earth polyselenide containing praseodymium in the +3 oxidation state. Its crystal structure contains both isolated selenide ions and Se_{2}^{2−} diselenide units.

== Preparation ==
Praseodymium diselenide can be prepared from pre-annealed praseodymium–selenium powders by chemical transport using iodine as transport agent. Single crystals were obtained over two weeks in a temperature gradient of about 800 to 600 °C.

== Properties ==
=== Structure ===
PrSe_{2} crystallizes in the monoclinic crystal system with the CeSe_{2} structure type, space group P2_{1}/a, with four formula units per unit cell. Its lattice parameters are a = 8.396(2) Å, b = 4.184(1) Å, c = 8.431(2) Å and β = 90.08(4)°. The structure consists of alternating puckered double layers containing praseodymium and selenium atoms and planar selenium layers. Selenium atoms in the planar layers form Se_{2}^{2−} dumbbells arranged in a herringbone pattern, with an Se–Se distance of 2.467(1) Å. The bonding can therefore be represented approximately as Pr^{3+}(Se^{2−})(Se_{2}^{2−})_{1/2}, giving an average selenium oxidation state of −1.5.

=== Non-stoichiometry ===
Praseodymium selenides form a series of selenium-deficient phases between Pr_{2}Se_{3} and PrSe_{2}. Compositions such as PrSe_{1.9} and PrSe_{1.85} are known and show ordered or modulated selenium-vacancy arrangements. In PrSe_{1.85}, the modulation originates from a selenium site-occupancy wave coupled to a charge-density wave in the planar selenium layer. Magnetic measurements across the PrSe_{2−x} series are consistent with essentially trivalent praseodymium.
