= Praseodymium(III) nitrate =

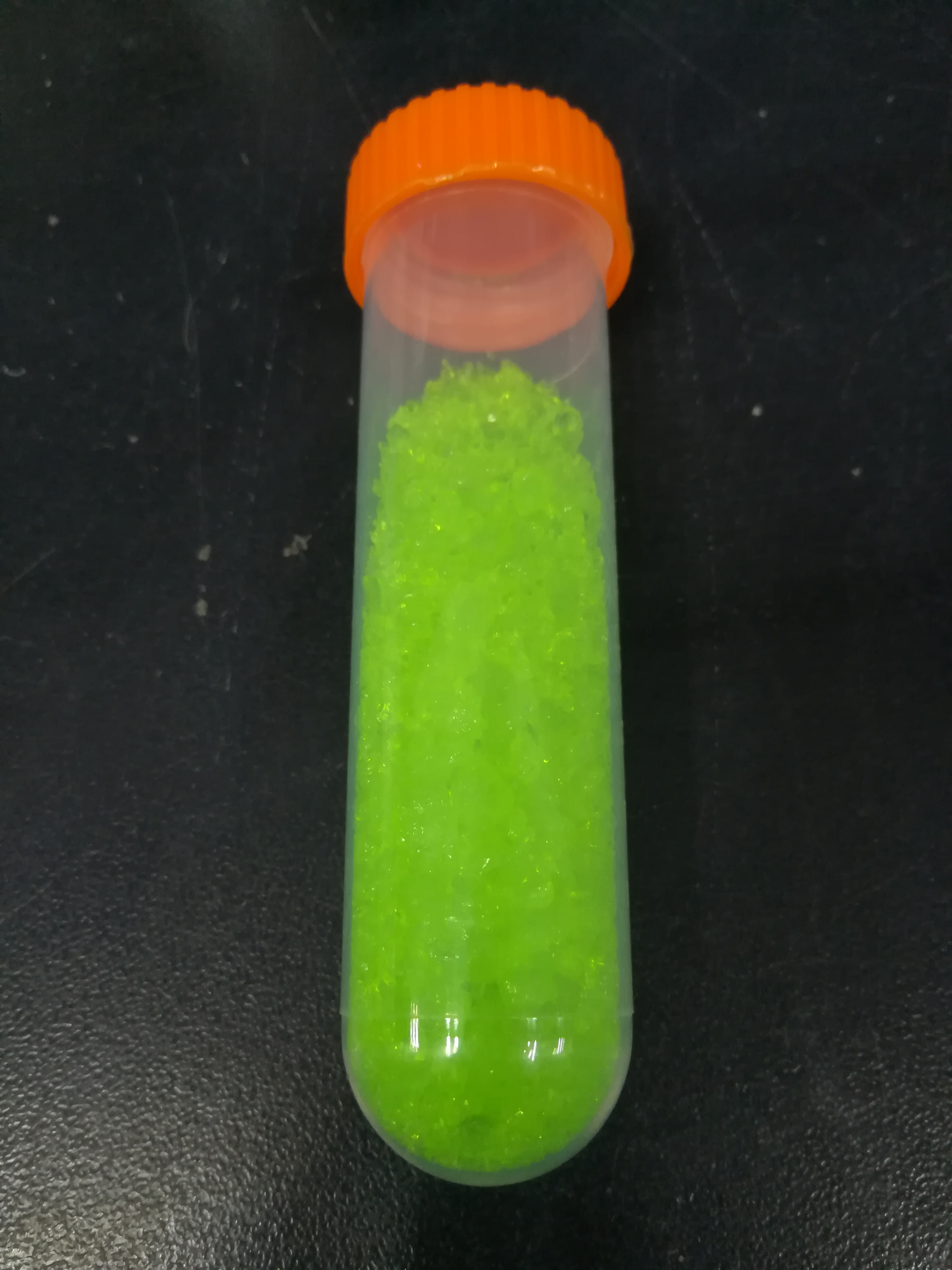
- Praseodymium nitrate hydrate

Names
- Other names: Praseodymium trinitrate

Identifiers
CAS Number	10361-80-5
3D model (JSmol)	Interactive image
ChemSpider	176852
ECHA InfoCard	100.030.711
EC Number	233-796-5
PubChem CID	498125
UNII	LQ73FSY2NF
CompTox Dashboard (EPA)	DTXSID10890656
- InChI: InChI=1S/3NO3.Pr/c3*2-1(3)4;/q3*-1;+3 Key: YWECOPREQNXXBZ-UHFFFAOYSA-N
- SMILES: [N+](=O)([O-])[O-].[N+](=O)([O-])[O-].[N+](=O)([O-])[O-].[Pr+3]

Properties
Chemical formula	Pr(NO_{3})_{3}
Molar mass	326.92 g/mol
Appearance	Green crystals
Solubility in water	Soluble
Solubility	Soluble in amine, ether, and acetonitrile

Hazards
- GHS labelling
Pictograms	(GHS03: Oxidizing) (GHS05: Corrosive) (GHS07: Exclamation mark) (GHS09: Environmental hazard)
Hazard statements	H272, H302, H315, H318, H410
Precautionary statements	P210, P220, P221, P261, P264, P270, P271, P273, P280, P301+P312, P302+P352, P304+P340, P305+P351+P338, P310, P312, P321, P330, P332+P313, P337+P313, P362, P370+P378, P391, P403+P233, P405, P501
NFPA 704 (fire diamond)	2 0 1 OX

Related compounds
Other anions	Praseodymium(III) sulfate
Other cations	Neodymium(III) nitrate
- Except where otherwise noted, data are given for materials in their standard state (at 25 °C [77 °F], 100 kPa). Infobox references

Praseodymium(III) nitrate is any inorganic compound with the chemical formula Pr(NO_{3})_{3}·xH_{2}O. These salts are used in the extraction and purification of praseodymium from its ores. The hexahydrate has been characterized by X-ray crystallography.

Praseodymium nitrate can be prepared by treating praseodymium oxide with nitric acid:

Pr_{2}O_{3} + 6 HNO_{3} → 2 Pr(NO_{3})_{3} + 3 H_{2}O
