= Praseodymium(III) sulfide =

Identifiers
CAS Number	12038-13-0
3D model (JSmol)	Interactive image
ChemSpider	145468
ECHA InfoCard	100.031.691
EC Number	234-874-1
PubChem CID	166019
CompTox Dashboard (EPA)	DTXSID60923362
- InChI: InChI=1S/2Pr.3S/q2*+3;3*-2 Key: VUXGXCBXGJZHNB-UHFFFAOYSA-N
- SMILES: [S-2].[S-2].[S-2].[Pr+3].[Pr+3]

Properties
Chemical formula	Pr_{2}S_{3}
Molar mass	378.00 g/mol
Appearance	brown powder
Odor	rotten egg
Density	5.042 g/cm^{3}, solid (11°C)
Magnetic susceptibility (χ)	+10,770·10^{−6} cm^{3}/mol

Hazards
NFPA 704 (fire diamond)	2 3 0
- Except where otherwise noted, data are given for materials in their standard state (at 25 °C [77 °F], 100 kPa). verify (what is ?) Infobox references

Praseodymium(III) sulfide is an inorganic chemical compound with chemical formula Pr_{2}S_{3}.

== Preparation ==
Praseodymium(III) sulfide can be obtained by reacting praseodymium(III) oxide and hydrogen sulfide at 1320 °C:

Pr_{2}O_{3} + 3H_{2}S → Pr_{2}S_{3} + 3H_{2}O

It could also be obtained by directly reacting sulfur with metallic praseodymium:

2Pr + 3S → Pr_{2}S_{3}
