= Praseodymium(III) chloride =

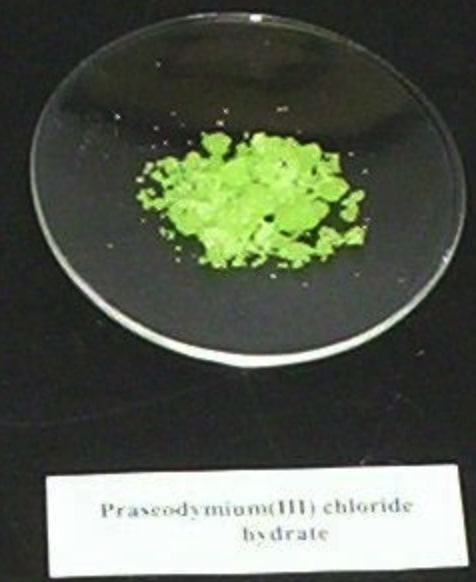

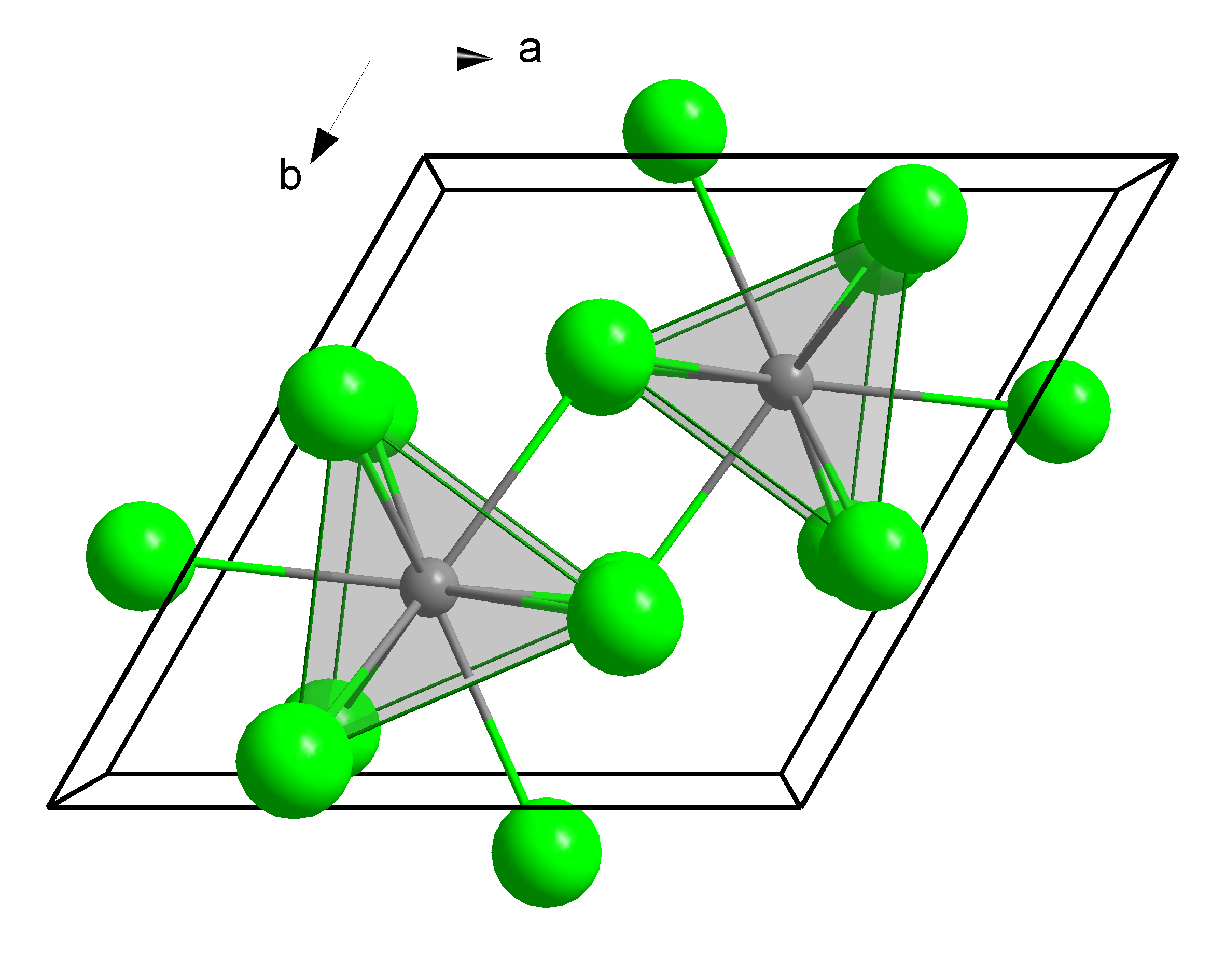

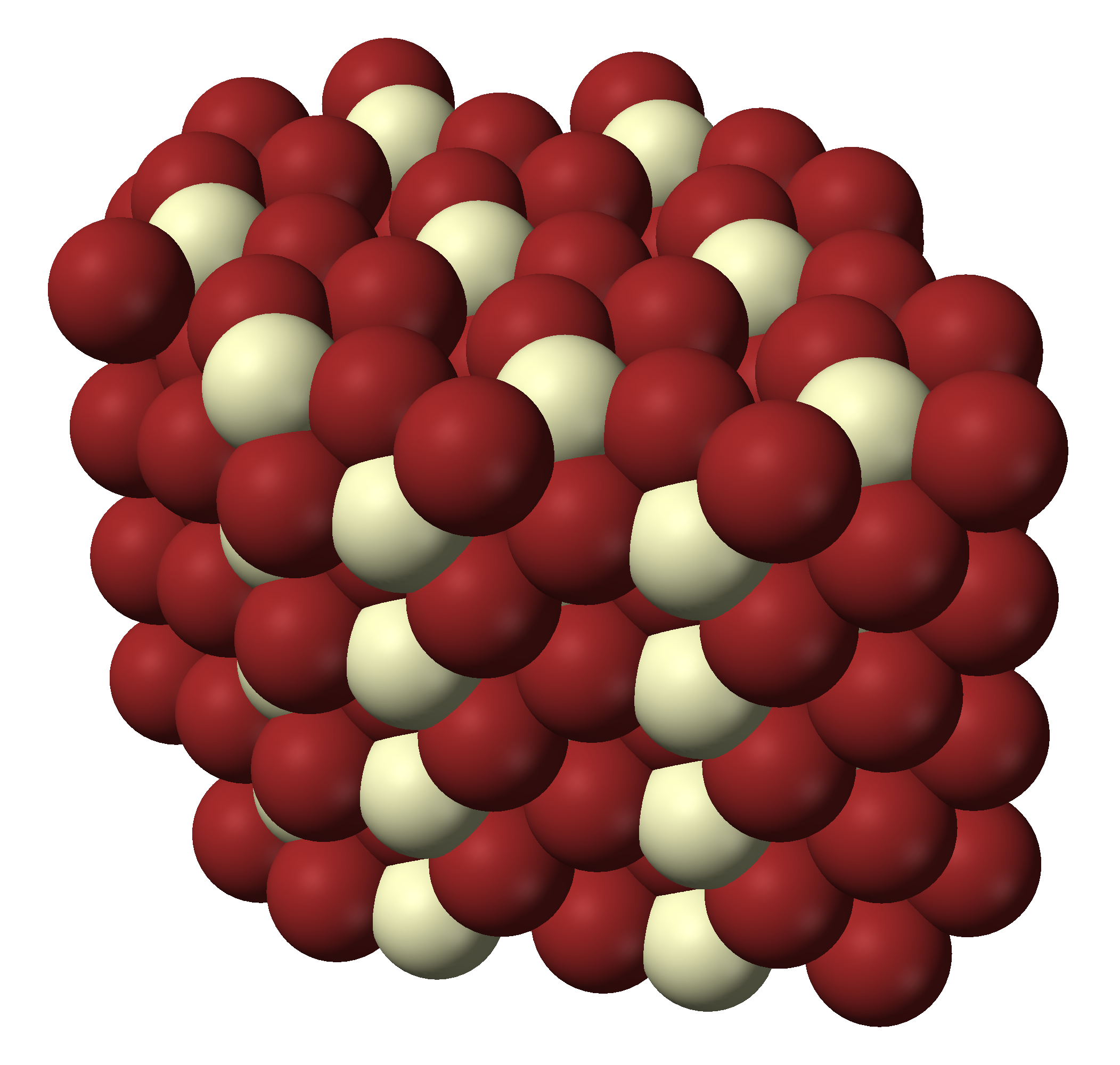

Names
- IUPAC name Praseodymium(III) chloride
- Other names Praseodymium chloride; praseodymium trichloride

Identifiers
CAS Number	10361-79-2; heptahydrate: 10025-90-8
3D model (JSmol)	Interactive image; heptahydrate: Interactive image
ChemSpider	59695
ECHA InfoCard	100.030.710
EC Number	233-794-4; heptahydrate: 812-561-6
PubChem CID	66317; heptahydrate: 21546488
UNII	1JB99PM4G8
CompTox Dashboard (EPA)	DTXSID7044766; heptahydrate: DTXSID60615795
- InChI: Key: LHBNLZDGIPPZLL-UHFFFAOYSA-K; InChI=1S/3ClH.Pr/h3*1H;/q;;;+3/p-3; heptahydrate: InChI=1S/3ClH.7H2O.Pr/h3*1H;7*1H2;/q;;;;;;;;;;+3/p-3 Key: RQHUQJCIAFYPAI-UHFFFAOYSA-K
- SMILES: Cl[Pr](Cl)Cl; heptahydrate: O.O.O.O.O.O.O.[Cl-].[Cl-].[Cl-].[Pr+3]

Properties
Chemical formula	PrCl_{3}
Molar mass	247.24 g/mol (anhydrous); 373.77 g/mol (heptahydrate)
Appearance	blue-green solid (anhydrous) light green solid (heptahydrate)
Density	4.02 g/cm^{3} (anhydrous); 2.250 g/cm^{3} (heptahydrate)
Melting point	786 °C (1,447 °F; 1,059 K)
Boiling point	1,710 °C (3,110 °F; 1,980 K)
Solubility in water	104.0 g/100 ml (13 °C)
Magnetic susceptibility (χ)	+44.5·10^{−6} cm^{3}/mol

Structure
Crystal structure	hexagonal (UCl_{3} type), hP8
Space group	P6_{3}/m, No. 176
Coordination geometry	Tricapped trigonal prismatic (nine-coordinate)

Hazards
- Occupational safety and health (OHS/OSH)
Main hazards	Irritant

Related compounds
Other anions	Praseodymium(III) oxide, Praseodymium(III) fluoride Praseodymium bromide praseodymium iodide
Other cations	Cerium(III) chloride Neodymium(III) chloride
- Except where otherwise noted, data are given for materials in their standard state (at 25 °C [77 °F], 100 kPa). verify (what is ?) Infobox references

Praseodymium(III) chloride is the inorganic compound with the formula PrCl_{3}. Like other lanthanide trichlorides, it exists both in the anhydrous and hydrated forms. It is a blue-green solid that rapidly absorbs water on exposure to moist air to form a light green heptahydrate.

== Preparation ==
Praseodymium(III) chloride is prepared by treating praseodymium metal with hydrogen chloride:

2 Pr + 6 HCl → 2 PrCl_{3} + 3 H_{2}

It is usually purified by vacuum sublimation.

Hydrated salts of praseodymium(III) chloride can be prepared by treatment of either praseodymium metal or praseodymium(III) carbonate with hydrochloric acid:

Pr_{2}(CO_{3})_{3} + 6 HCl + 15 H_{2}O → 2 [Pr(H_{2}O)_{9}]Cl_{3} + 3 CO_{2}

PrCl_{3}∙7H_{2}O is a hygroscopic substance, that will not crystallize from the mother liquor unless it is left to dry in a desiccator. Anhydrous PrCl_{3} can be made by thermal dehydration of the hydrate at 400 °C in the presence of ammonium chloride, the so-called ammonium chloride route. Alternatively the hydrate can be dehydrated using thionyl chloride.

== Reactions ==
Praseodymium(III) chloride is Lewis acidic, classified as "hard" according to the HSAB concept. Rapid heating of the hydrate may cause small amounts of hydrolysis. PrCl_{3} forms a stable Lewis acid-base complex K_{2}PrCl_{5} by reaction with potassium chloride; this compound shows interesting optical and magnetic properties.

Aqueous solutions of praseodymium(III) chloride can be used to prepare insoluble praseodymium(III) compounds. For example, praseodymium(III) phosphate and praseodymium(III) fluoride can be prepared by reaction with potassium phosphate and sodium fluoride, respectively:

PrCl_{3} + K_{3}PO_{4} → PrPO_{4} + 3 KCl
PrCl_{3} + 3 NaF → PrF_{3} + 3 NaCl
2PrCl_{3} + 3 Na_{2}CO_{3}----> Pr_{2}CO_{3} + 6NaCl

When heated with alkali metal chlorides, it forms a series of ternary (compounds containing three different elements) materials with the formulae MPr_{2}Cl_{7}, M_{3}PrCl_{6}, M_{2}PrCl_{5}, and M_{3}Pr_{2}Cl_{9} where M = K, Rb, Cs.

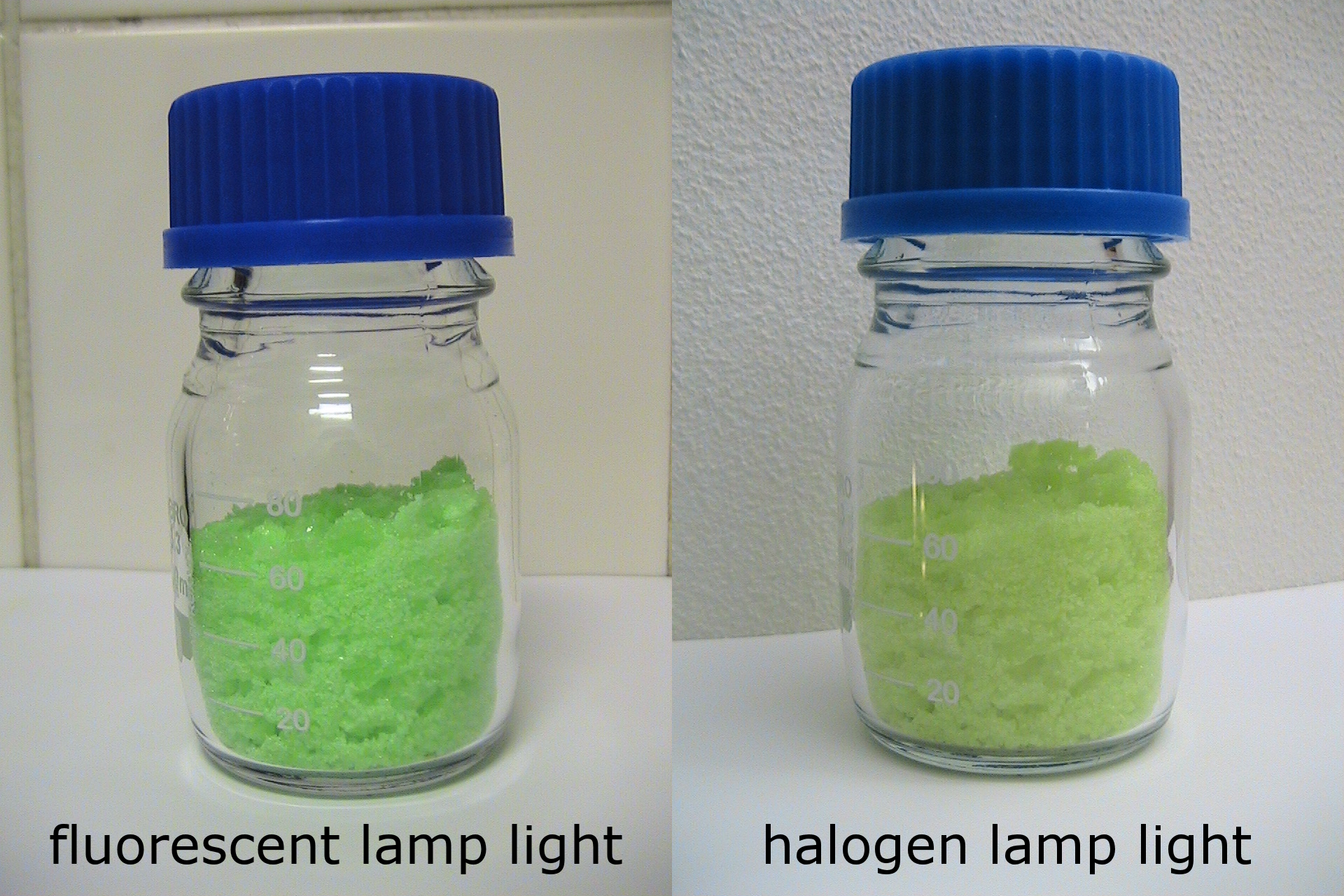
Praseodymium chloride heptahydrate under different light
