= Praseodymium(III) bromide =

Names
- IUPAC name Praseodymium(III) bromide

Identifiers
CAS Number	13536-53-3
3D model (JSmol)	Interactive image
ChemSpider	75391
ECHA InfoCard	100.033.524
EC Number	236-893-0236-893-0
PubChem CID	83561
CompTox Dashboard (EPA)	DTXSID9065524
- InChI: InChI=1S/3BrH.Pr/h3*1H;/q;;;+3/p-3 Key: PLKCYEBERAEWDR-UHFFFAOYSA-K
- SMILES: Br[Pr](Br)Br

Properties
Chemical formula	PrBr_{3}
Molar mass	380.62 g/mol
Appearance	Green crystalline solid
Density	5.28 g/cm^{3}
Melting point	691 °C (1,276 °F; 964 K) Some sources say 693 °C
Boiling point	1,547 °C (2,817 °F; 1,820 K)

Structure
Crystal structure	Tricapped trigonal prismatic
Coordination geometry	9

Hazards
- Occupational safety and health (OHS/OSH)
Main hazards	Irritation
- GHS labelling
Pictograms	(GHS07: Exclamation mark)
Signal word	Warning
Hazard statements	H315, H319
Precautionary statements	P261, P280, P305+P351+P338
- Except where otherwise noted, data are given for materials in their standard state (at 25 °C [77 °F], 100 kPa). Infobox references

Praseodymium(III) bromide is a crystalline compound of one praseodymium atom and three bromine atoms.

== Characteristics ==
=== Appearance ===
Praseodymium(III) bromide is a green solid at room temperature. It is usually handled as a powder.

=== Physical ===
Praseodymium(III) bromide's molecular weight is 380.62 g. Praseodymium bromide has a density of 5.28 g/cm^{2}.

PrBr_{3} adopts the UCl_{3} crystal structure. The praseodymium ions are 9-coordinate and adopt a tricapped trigonal prismatic geometry. The praseodymium–bromine bond lengths are 3.05 Å and 3.13 Å.

=== Chemical ===
Praseodymium(III) bromide is hygroscopic. Praseodymium(III) bromide has an oxidation number of 3.

=== Hazard ===
Praseodymium(III) bromide can cause skin irritation (H315/R38), eye irritation (H319/R36), and that breathing dust/fume/gas/mist/vapours/spray of Praseodymium(III) bromide should be avoided (P261/S23), that one should wash hands thoroughly after handling (P264), one should wear protective gloves and clothes clothing, and wear eye protection and face protection (P280/S36/S37/S39), and that if one gets Praseodymium(III) bromide in their eyes, that they should wash their eyes cautiously for several minutes, removing contact lenses if possible (P305).
