= Praseodymium(III) oxide =

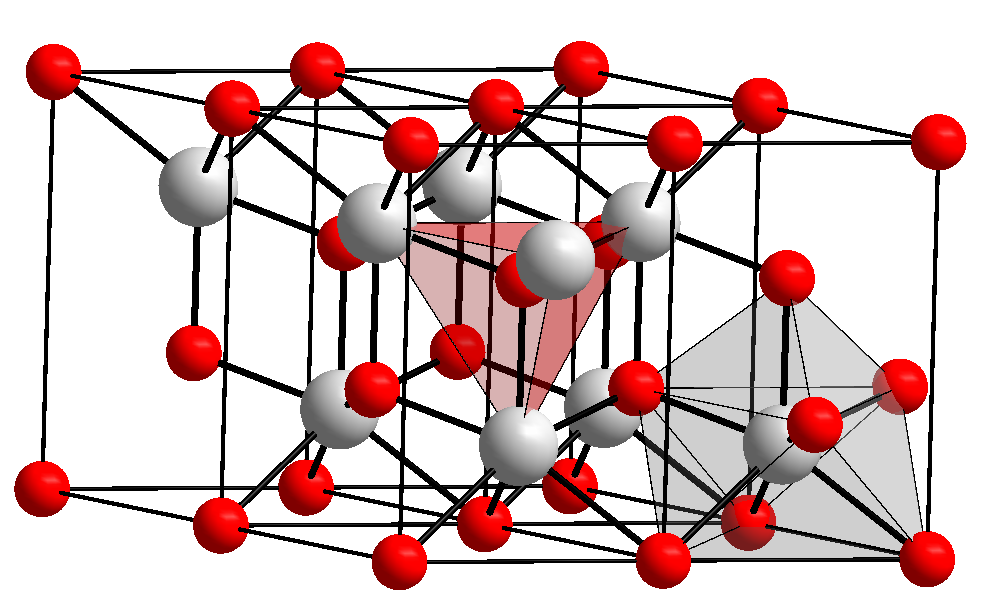
- Pr^{3+} O^{2−}

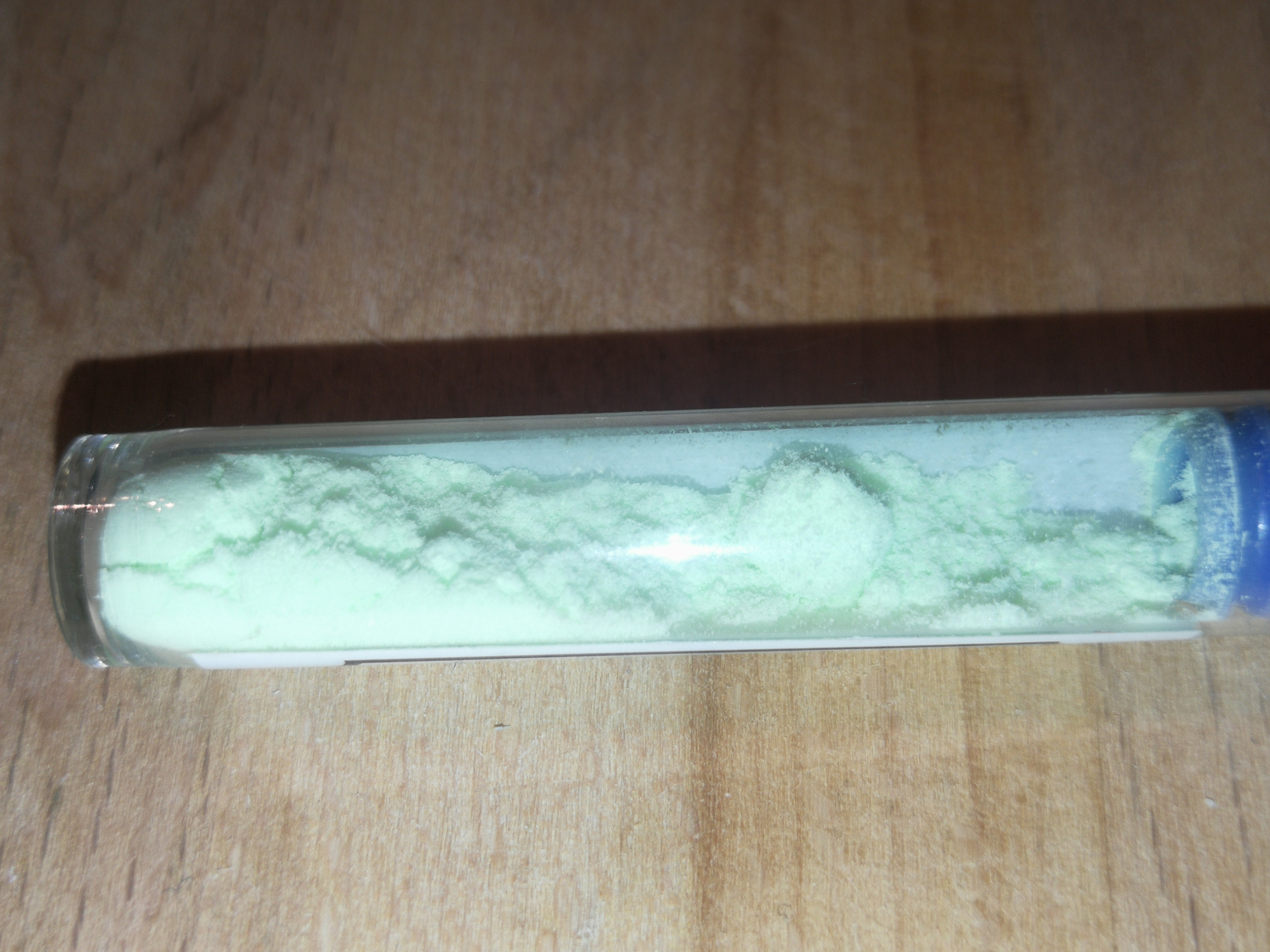

Names
- IUPAC name Praseodymium(III) oxide
- Other names Praseodymium oxide, Praseodymium sesquioxide

Identifiers
CAS Number	12036-32-7
3D model (JSmol)	Interactive image
ChemSpider	145400
ECHA InfoCard	100.031.665
EC Number	234-845-3
PubChem CID	165911
CompTox Dashboard (EPA)	DTXSID50884498
- InChI: InChI=1S/3O.2Pr/q3*-2;2*+3 Key: MMKQUGHLEMYQSG-UHFFFAOYSA-N
- SMILES: [O-2].[O-2].[O-2].[Pr+3].[Pr+3]

Properties
Chemical formula	Pr_{2}O_{3}
Molar mass	329.813 g/mol
Appearance	light green solid
Density	6.9 g/cm^{3}
Melting point	2,183 °C (3,961 °F; 2,456 K)
Boiling point	3,760 °C (6,800 °F; 4,030 K)
Magnetic susceptibility (χ)	+8994.0·10^{−6} cm^{3}/mol

Structure
Crystal structure	Hexagonal, hP5
Space group	P-3m1, No. 164

Thermochemistry
Heat capacity (C)	117.4 J•mol^{−1}•K^{−1}
Std enthalpy of formation (Δ_{f}H^{⦵}_{298})	−1809.6 kJ•mol^{−1}

Related compounds
Other anions	Praseodymium(III) chloride Praseodymium(III) sulfide
Other cations	Neodymium(III) oxide Promethium(III) oxide Cerium(III) oxide
Related compounds	Uranium(VI) oxide
- Except where otherwise noted, data are given for materials in their standard state (at 25 °C [77 °F], 100 kPa). verify (what is ?) Infobox references

Praseodymium(III) oxide, praseodymium oxide or praseodymia is the chemical compound composed of praseodymium and oxygen with the formula Pr_{2}O_{3}. It forms light green hexagonal crystals. Praseodymium(III) oxide crystallizes in the manganese(III) oxide or bixbyite structure.

== Uses ==
Praseodymium(III) oxide can be used as a dielectric in combination with silicon. Praseodymium-doped glass, called didymium glass, turns yellow and is used in welding goggles because it blocks infrared radiation. Praseodymium(III) oxide is also used to color glass and ceramics yellow. For coloring ceramics, also the very dark brown mixed-valence compound praseodymium(III,IV) oxide, Pr_{6}O_{11}, is used.
