= Praseodymium orthoscandate =

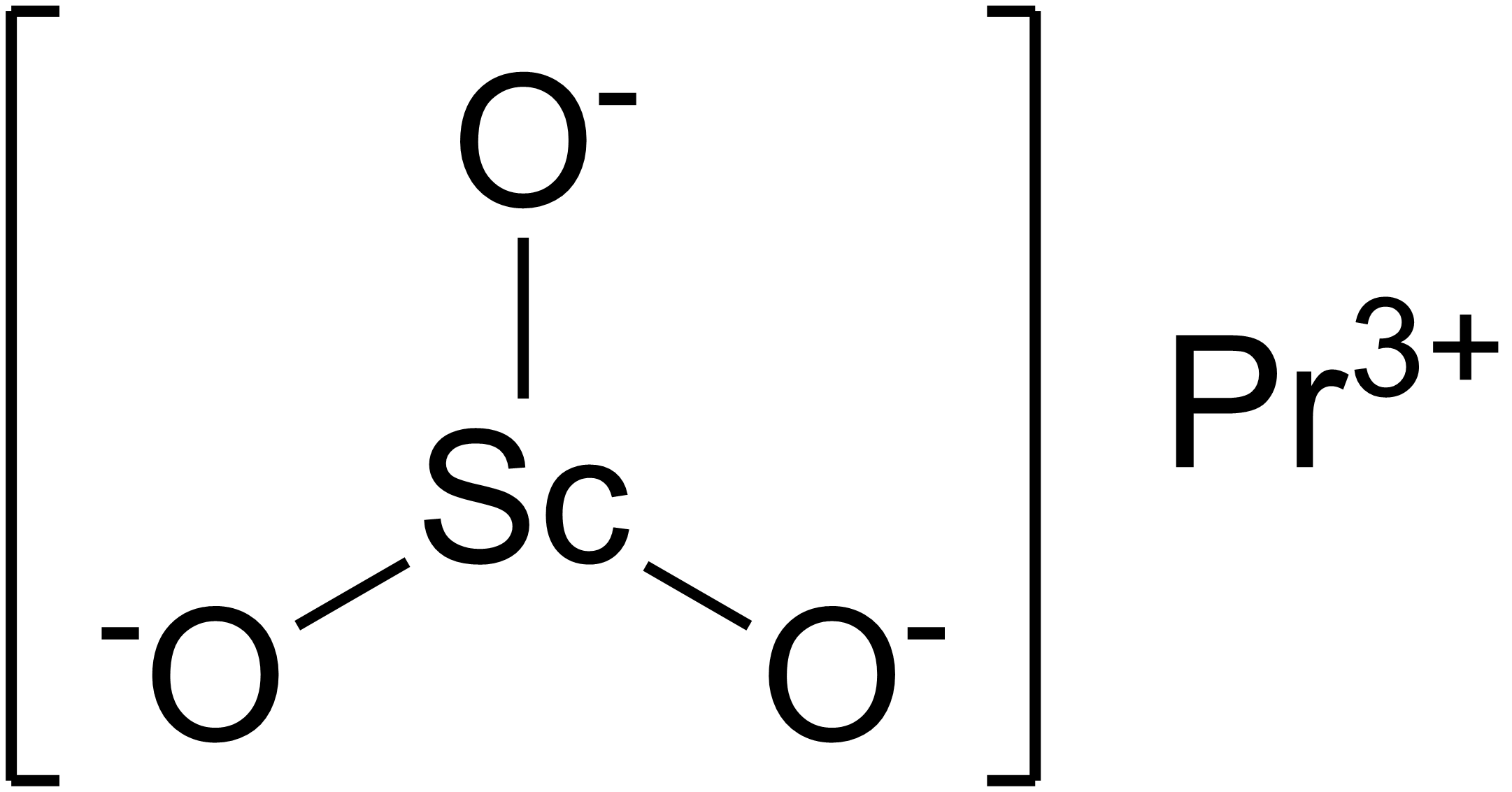

Names
- IUPAC name Praseodymium orthoscandate
- Other names: Praseodymium scandium oxide

Identifiers
CAS Number	60862-57-9
3D model (JSmol)	Interactive image
- InChI: InChI=1S/3O.Pr.Sc/q3*-2;2*+3 Key: AEHKERRAGQMUMT-UHFFFAOYSA-N
- SMILES: [Pr+3].[Sc+3].[O-2].[O-2].[O-2]

Properties
Chemical formula	PrScO_{3}
Appearance	green solid
Density	5.9 g/cm^{−3}
Melting point	2200°C
- Except where otherwise noted, data are given for materials in their standard state (at 25 °C [77 °F], 100 kPa). Infobox references

Praseodymium orthoscandate is a chemical compound, a rare-earth oxide with a perovskite structure. It has the chemical formula of PrScO_{3}.

== Preparation ==
Praseodymium orthoscandate can be obtained by reacting praseodymium(III,IV) oxide with scandium oxide.

== Properties ==
Praseodymium orthoscandate is a green solid. It has an orthorhombic perovskite-type crystal structure with space group Pnma (space group No. 62).

In 2021, with the help of electron ptychography, researchers were able to achieve the highest magnification. In this way, the researchers managed to enlarge the atoms of a praseodymium orthoscandate crystal by a factor of 100 million so as to present each atom as a separate entity, easily identifiable by element.

== See also ==
- Praseodymium
- Scandium
- Oxygen
