= Paul-Émile Lecoq de Boisbaudran =

French chemist (1838–1912)

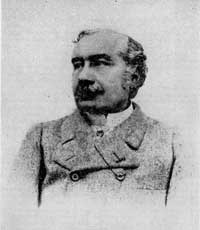
- Born: 18 April 1838; Cognac, France
- Died: 28 May 1912 (aged 74); Paris, France
- Known for: Discovery of gallium, samarium and dysprosium Contributions to spectroscopy
- Awards: Davy Medal (1879)
- Scientific career
- Fields: Chemistry, spectroscopy

Paul-Émile Lecoq de Boisbaudran, also called François Lecoq de Boisbaudran (18 April 1838 – 28 May 1912), was a self-taught French chemist known for his discoveries of the chemical elements gallium, samarium and dysprosium. He developed methods for separation and purification of the rare earth elements and was one of the pioneers of the science of spectroscopy.

== Biography ==
Lecoq de Boisbaudran was a member of a noble family of Huguenots from the French provinces of Poitou and Angoumois. The Huguenots were French Protestants, a population that was devastated during the French Wars of Religion (1561–1598). The Edict of Nantes (1598) granted substantial civil rights to the Huguenots even though it maintained Catholicism's position as the established religion of France. The Edict of Nantes was overturned by the Edict of Fontainebleau (1685), which officially sanctioned persecution of Protestants. The Lecoq de Boisbaudran family was of considerable fortune until the revocation of the Edict of Nantes, after which much of their property was confiscated and sold.

Paul-Émile (Francois) Lecoq de Boisbaudran was a son of Paul Lecoq de Boisbaudran (1801–1870) and his wife Anne Louise. Paul Lecoq de Boisbaudran established a successful wine business in Cognac, benefiting from the hard work of the entire family including young Paul-Émile.

Anne Louise Lecoq de Boisbaudran was well educated and taught her son Paul-Émile history and foreign languages, including English. He obtained the syllabus of the École Polytechnique, and he studied the books assigned in its courses. In this way, he was self-taught as a scientist. As such, de Boisbaudran is an example of an autodidact. With the support of his family, he assembled a modest chemical laboratory on the second floor of their home on the Rue de Lusignan. In this laboratory, he repeated the experiments that he had studied in books. Through these experiments, he developed his theories of spectroscopy and made most of his discoveries, including the isolation of gallium.

Lecoq de Boisbaudran married Jeannette Nadault-Valette (1852–1926) on 27 December 1897. They had no children. He developed ankylosis of the joints, and failing health hindered his work after 1895. He died in 1912, at the age of 74.

== Research ==
Lecoq de Boisbaudran's early investigations focused on understanding the phenomenon of supersaturation, in which substances can exist in solution in higher concentrations than is possible under normal conditions. He showed that contact of supersaturated solutions with crystals of an isomorphous salt causes the substance to precipitate from the solution. He further showed that many anhydrous salts can be dissolved to create a supersaturated solution. These investigations were carried out from 1866 to 1869.

In 1874 Lecoq de Boisbaudran found that certain crystal faces dissolve more rapidly than other crystal faces. Specifically, he found that octahedral faces are less readily soluble than cubic faces in the case of ammonium alum crystals.

Lecoq de Boisbaudran made major contributions to the then-new science of spectroscopy, which relates to the interaction of light and matter. He applied spectroscopy to characterize elements, particularly the rare-earth elements. He developed a theoretical framework of spectroscopy, based on molecular vibrations. Theorizing that spectral frequencies relate to the atomic weight of an element, he recognized spectral trends based upon atomic masses.

Boisbaudran developed new experimental apparatus and used these to carry out spectral analyses of various chemical elements. Through systematic experimentation, he analysed spectra of 35 elements, using the Bunsen burner, electric spark or both to induce luminescence of samples of the elements. The results of his early investigations were published in his Spectres lumineux : spectres prismatiques et en longueurs d'ondes destinés aux recherches de chimie minérale (1874).

To observe spark spectra in his experimental protocols, he typically placed a solution of a salt in a sealed glass tube, with a platinum wire in the solution as a negative pole, and another platinum wire above the surface of the liquid as a positive pole. In 1885, he experimented with reversing the polarity of the electric current. In this way, he obtained phosphorescent bands in the spectra providing further insight into the spectral characteristics of various chemical elements. Using this apparatus, he discovered the lanthanides samarium (1880), dysprosium (1886) and europium (1890). In 1885, he also spectroscopically characterized gadolinium in 1885, an element previously discovered in 1880 by J. C. Galissard de Marignac.

=== Samarium ===
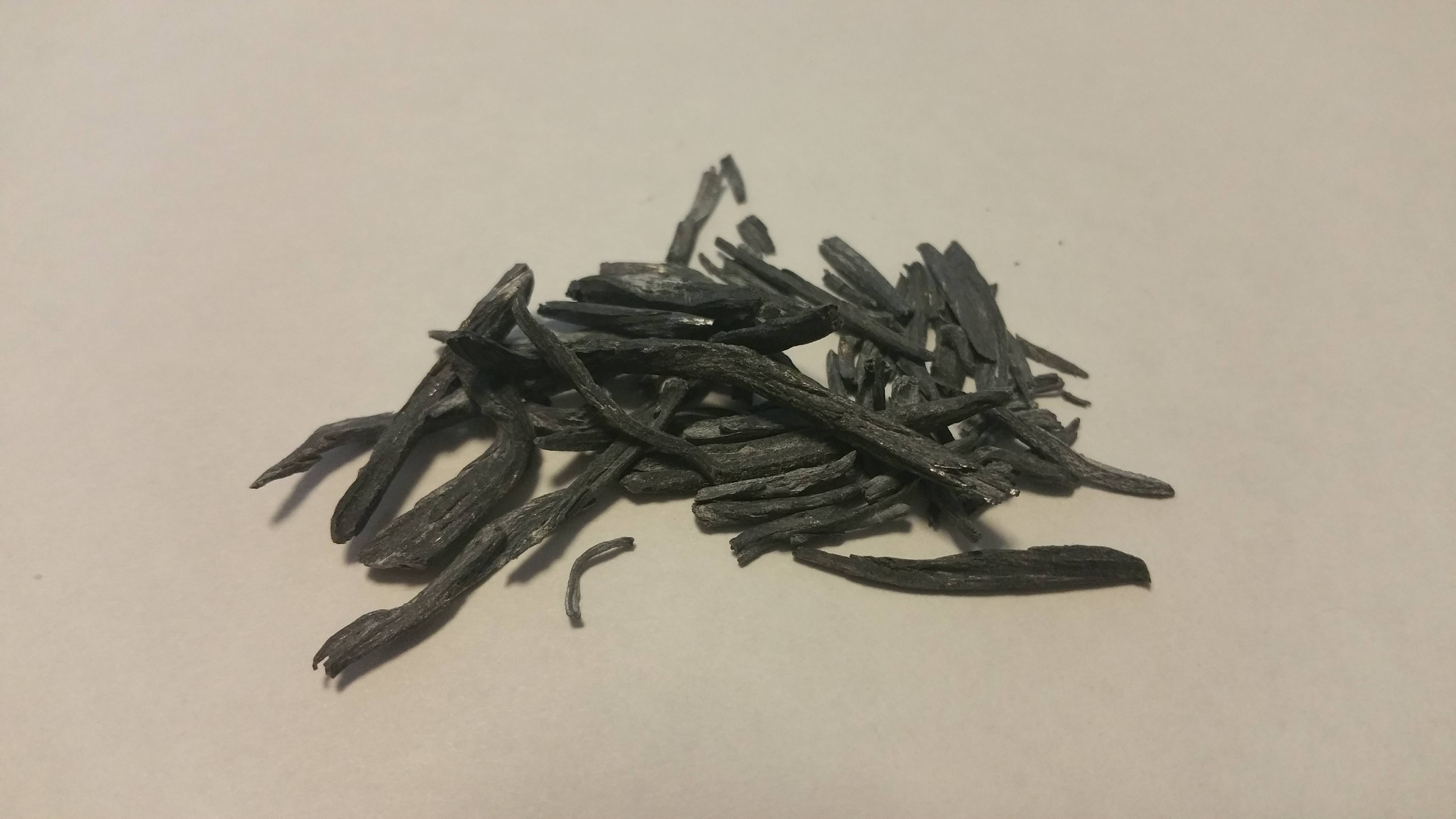
Samarium

Lecoq de Boisbaudran discovered samarium in 1879 after first isolating samarium oxide. He identified the presence of a new element by using spectroscopy to observe its characteristic sharp optical absorption lines.

He named his new element "samarium" after the mineral samarskite from which it was isolated. The mineral itself was earlier named for a Russian mine official, Colonel Vassili Samarsky-Bykhovets.

=== Gallium ===
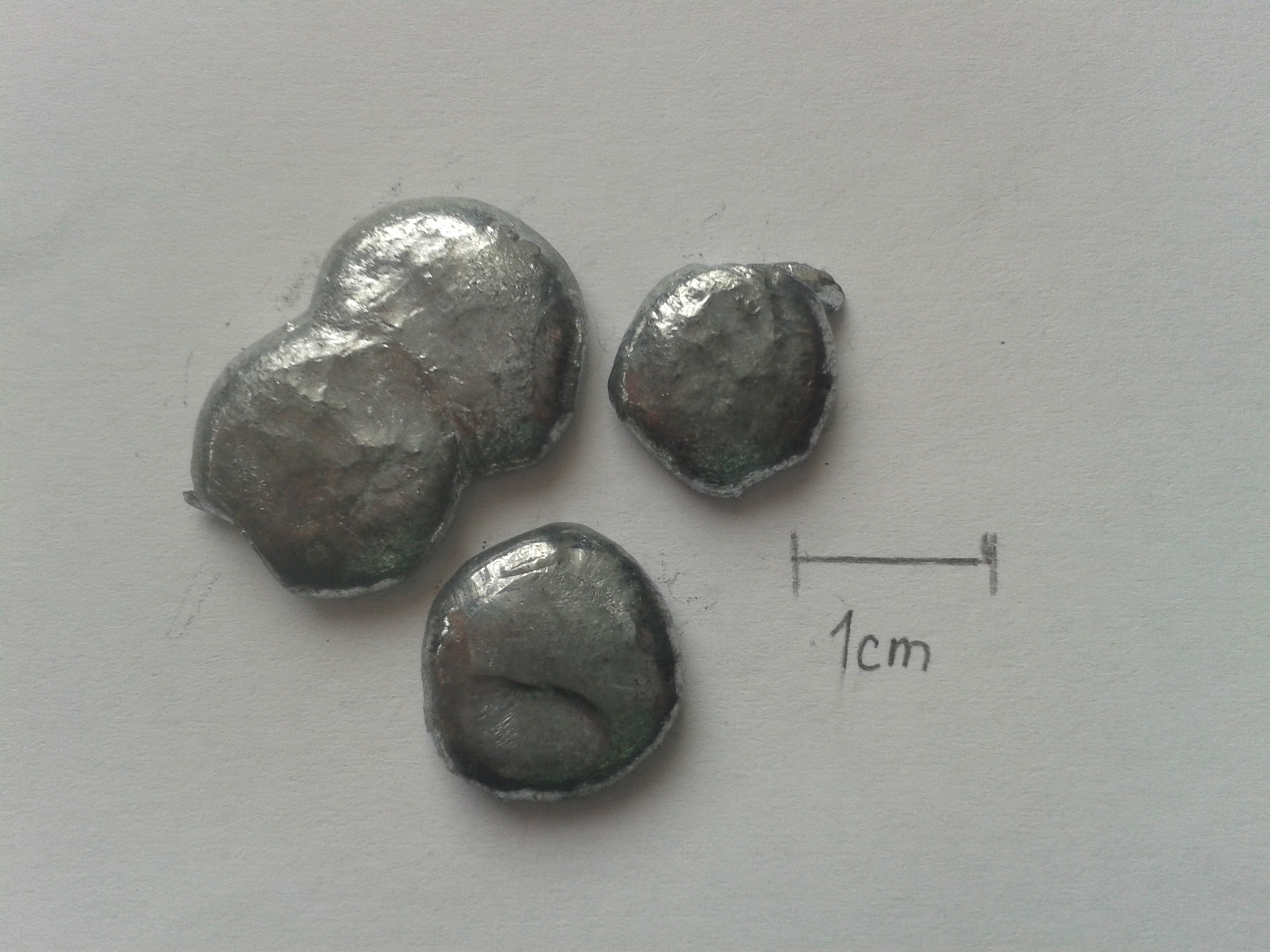
Gallium

A significant achievement of Lecoq de Boisbaudran was his discovery of the element gallium in 1875. Beginning in 1874, Lecoq de Boisbaudran investigated a sample of 52 kg of the mineral ore sphalerite obtained from the Pierrefitte mine in the Pyrenees. From it, he extracted several milligrams of gallium chloride. Using spectroscopic methods, he observed what appeared to be two previously unreported lines in the sample's spectrum, at wavelengths of 4170 and 4031 angstroms.

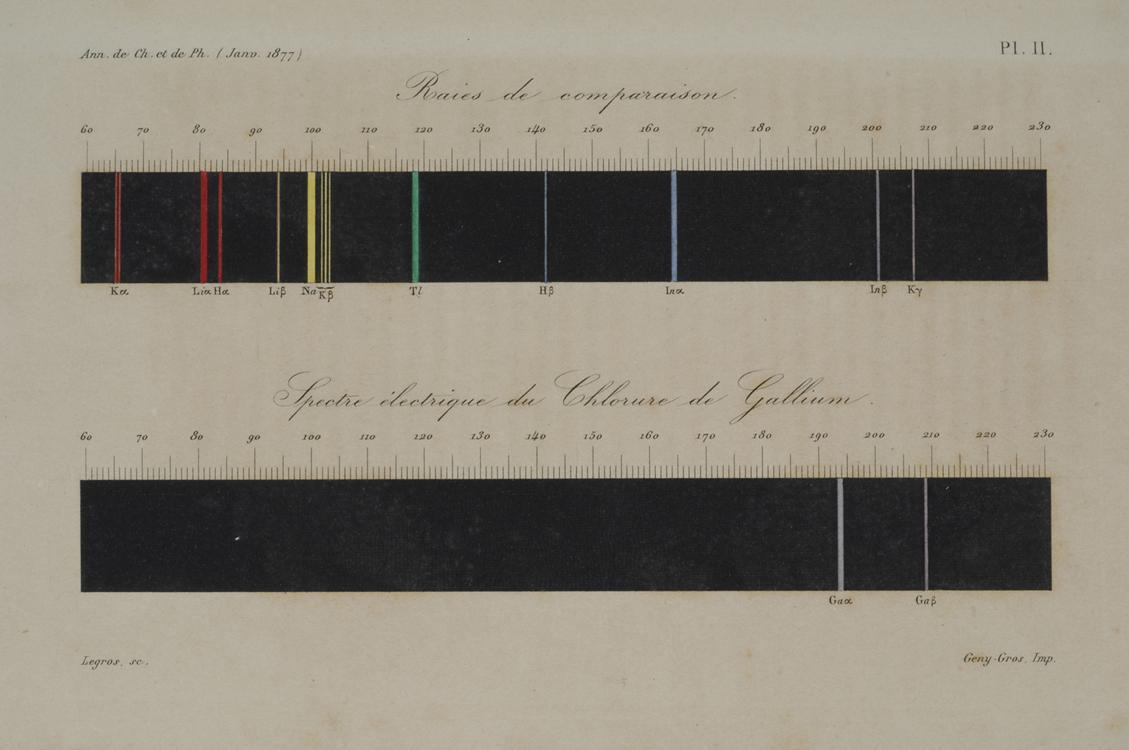
Spectre electrique du Chlorure de Gallium, 1877

He continued his experiments using several hundred kilograms of crude zinc ore and in the same year isolated more than one gram of a near-pure metal by electrolysis of a solution of the metal in its form as a hydroxide compound, dissolved in potassium hydroxide solution. Later he prepared 75 grams of gallium using more than 4 tonnes of crude ore. He confirmed its spectral characteristics, consisting of two spectral lines in the violet portion of the spectrum of the mineral sphalerite. In this way, he ruled out the possibility that the spectral characteristics were an accident of the extraction process, rather than being an indication of a new element.

He named his discovery "gallium", from the Latin Gallia meaning Gaul, in honor of his native land of France. It was later suggested that Lecoq de Boisbaudran had named the element after himself, since gallus is the Latin translation of the French le coq. Lecoq de Boisbaudran denied this suggestion in an article in 1877. He published an account of his investigations on the new element in Sur un nouveau metal, le gallium (1877).

De Boisbaudran calculated the atomic mass of gallium as 69.86, close to the currently accepted value of 69.723. Unknown to Lecoq de Boisbaudran, the existence of gallium had been predicted during 1871 by Dmitri Mendeleev, who gave it the name eka-aluminium. De Boisbaudran's discovery of gallium was significant support for Mendeleev's theory of the periodicity of the elements.

=== Dysprosium ===
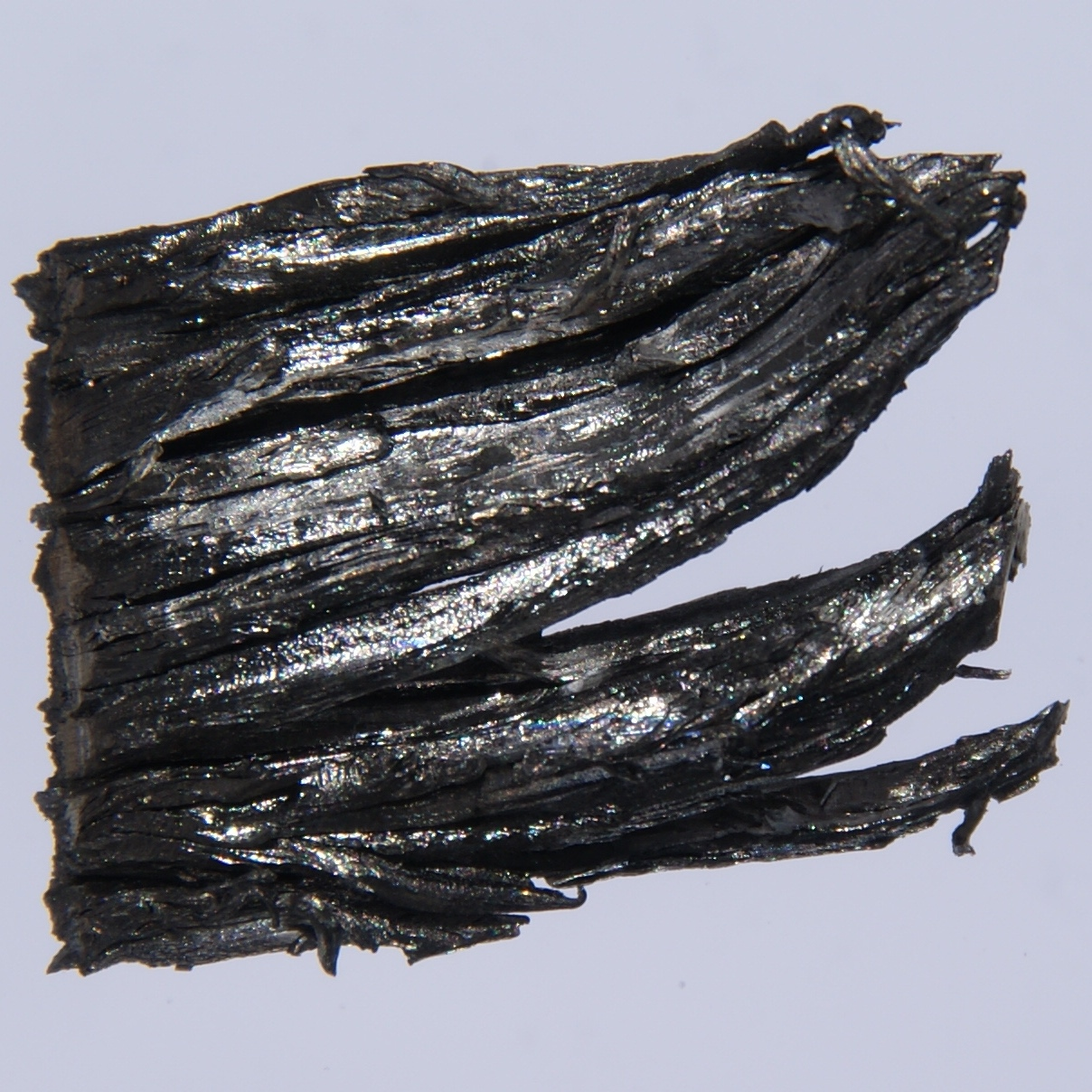
Dysprosium

Lecoq de Boisbaudran experimented with the precipitation of rare earth compounds from water solution using potassium sulfate to induce precipitation. He then measured the spectra of solutions in which the liquid served as a positive pole. Lecoq de Boisbaudran noted a spectral band in the yellow-green portion of the spectrum, indicative of a new element. In 1886 he succeeded in isolating a purified sample of the source of the new spectral band. He named the element dysprosium, meaning "difficult to obtain" in the Greek language.

=== Periodic classification of elements ===
Lecoq de Boisbaudran contributed to the development of the periodic classification of elements. This contribution occurred when he proposed that the newly discovered element argon was a member of a new, previously unrecognized, chemical series of elements that came to be known as the noble gases.

== Awards and honors ==
For his accomplishments, Lecoq de Boisbaudran was awarded the Cross of the Legion of Honour (1876), the Bordin Prize from the French Academy of Sciencies (1872), the Davy Medal (1879) and the Prix Lacaze of 10,000 francs (1879). In 1888 he was elected a foreign member of the British Royal Society.

== Sources ==
- This article incorporates text from Obituary notices, by William Ramsay, a publication from 1913, now in the public domain in the United States.
