= Decipium =

Proposed chemical element

Decipium was the proposed name for a new chemical element isolated by Marc Delafontaine from the mineral samarskite. He published his discovery in 1878 and later published a follow-up paper in 1881.

Decipium was considered to be in the cerium group of rare earths.

In 1880, spectral analysis proved that decipium had a high samarium content. It is now believed that Delafontaine's decipium sample was a mixture of samarium with traces of other rare earth elements.
