= Samarium =

Samarium, _{62}Sm
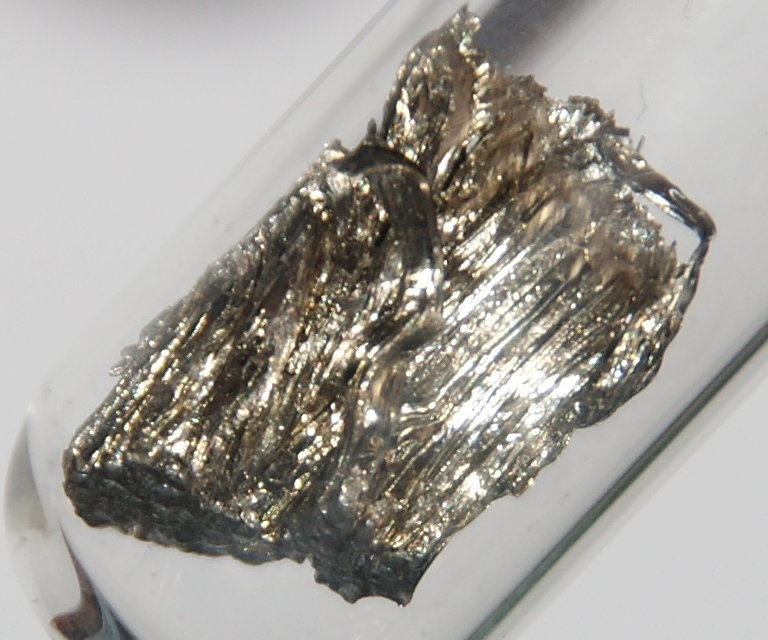

Samarium
- Pronunciation: /səˈmɛəriəm/ (sə-MAIR-ee-əm)
- Appearance: silvery white

Standard atomic weight A_{r}°(Sm)
- 150.36±0.02; 150.36±0.02 (abridged)

Samarium in the periodic table
Hydrogen																															Helium
Lithium	Beryllium																									Boron	Carbon	Nitrogen	Oxygen	Fluorine	Neon
Sodium	Magnesium																									Aluminium	Silicon	Phosphorus	Sulfur	Chlorine	Argon
Potassium	Calcium															Scandium	Titanium	Vanadium	Chromium	Manganese	Iron	Cobalt	Nickel	Copper	Zinc	Gallium	Germanium	Arsenic	Selenium	Bromine	Krypton
Rubidium	Strontium															Yttrium	Zirconium	Niobium	Molybdenum	Technetium	Ruthenium	Rhodium	Palladium	Silver	Cadmium	Indium	Tin	Antimony	Tellurium	Iodine	Xenon
Caesium	Barium	Lanthanum	Cerium	Praseodymium	Neodymium	Promethium	Samarium	Europium	Gadolinium	Terbium	Dysprosium	Holmium	Erbium	Thulium	Ytterbium	Lutetium	Hafnium	Tantalum	Tungsten	Rhenium	Osmium	Iridium	Platinum	Gold	Mercury (element)	Thallium	Lead	Bismuth	Polonium	Astatine	Radon
Francium	Radium	Actinium	Thorium	Protactinium	Uranium	Neptunium	Plutonium	Americium	Curium	Berkelium	Californium	Einsteinium	Fermium	Mendelevium	Nobelium	Lawrencium	Rutherfordium	Dubnium	Seaborgium	Bohrium	Hassium	Meitnerium	Darmstadtium	Roentgenium	Copernicium	Nihonium	Flerovium	Moscovium	Livermorium	Tennessine	Oganesson
–
↑
Sm
↓
Pu
promethium ← samarium → europium
- Atomic number (Z): 62
- Group: f-block groups (no number)
- Period: period 6
- Block: f-block
- Electron configuration: [Xe] 4f^{6} 6s^{2}
- Electrons per shell: 2, 8, 18, 24, 8, 2

Physical properties
- Phase at STP: solid
- Melting point: 1345 K (1072 °C, 1962 °F)
- Boiling point: 2173 K (1900 °C, 3452 °F)
- Density (at 20° C): 7.518 g/cm^{3}
- when liquid (at m.p.): 7.16 g/cm^{3}
- Heat of fusion: 8.62 kJ/mol
- Heat of vaporization: 192 kJ/mol
- Molar heat capacity: 29.54 J/(mol·K)
- Specific heat capacity: 196.462 J/(kg·K)
Vapor pressure
P (Pa)	1	10	100	1 k	10 k	100 k
at T (K)	1001	1106	1240	(1421)	(1675)	(2061)

Atomic properties
- Oxidation states: common: +3; 0, +1, +2
- Electronegativity: Pauling scale: 1.17
- Ionization energies: 1st: 544.5 kJ/mol; 2nd: 1070 kJ/mol; 3rd: 2260 kJ/mol
- Atomic radius: empirical: 180 pm
- Covalent radius: 198±8 pm
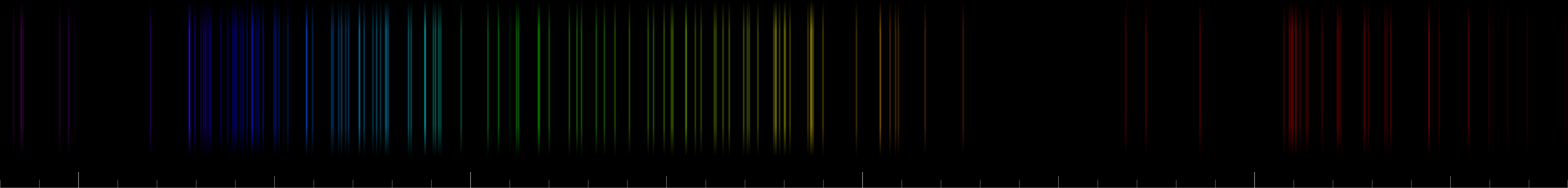
- Spectral lines of samarium

Other properties
- Natural occurrence: primordial
- Crystal structure: rhombohedral (hR3)
- Lattice constants: a_{r} = 0.89834 nm α = 23.307° a_{h} = 0.36291 nm c_{h} = 2.6207 nm (at 20 °C)
- Thermal expansion: poly: 12.7 (at r.t.) µm/(m⋅K)
- Thermal conductivity: 13.3 W/(m⋅K)
- Electrical resistivity: α, poly: 0.940 (at r.t.) µΩ⋅m
- Magnetic ordering: paramagnetic
- Molar magnetic susceptibility: +1860.0×10^{−6} cm^{3}/mol (291 K)
- Young's modulus: 49.7 GPa
- Shear modulus: 19.5 GPa
- Bulk modulus: 37.8 GPa
- Speed of sound thin rod: 2130 m/s (at 20 °C)
- Poisson ratio: 0.274
- Vickers hardness: 410–440 MPa
- Brinell hardness: 440–600 MPa
- CAS Number: 7440-19-9

History
- Naming: after the mineral samarskite (itself named after Vassili Samarsky-Bykhovets)
- Discovery: Lecoq de Boisbaudran (1879)
- First isolation: Wilhelm Muthmann (1903)

Isotopes of samarium
Main isotopes			Decay	
Isotope	abundance	half-life (t_{1/2})	mode	product
^{144}Sm	3.08%	stable		
^{145}Sm	synth	340 d	ε	^{145}Pm
^{146}Sm	trace	9.20×10^{7} y	α	^{142}Nd
^{147}Sm	15%	1.066×10^{11} y	α	^{143}Nd
^{148}Sm	11.3%	6.3×10^{15} y	α	^{144}Nd
^{149}Sm	13.8%	stable		
^{150}Sm	7.37%	stable		
^{151}Sm	synth	94.6 y	β^{−}	^{151}Eu
^{152}Sm	26.7%	stable		
^{153}Sm	synth	46.285 h	β^{−}	^{153}Eu
^{154}Sm	22.7%	stable		

Samarium is a chemical element; it has symbol Sm and atomic number 62. It is a moderately hard silvery metal that slowly oxidizes in air. Being a typical member of the lanthanide series, samarium usually has the oxidation state +3. Compounds of samarium(II) are also known, most notably the monoxide SmO, monochalcogenides SmS, SmSe and SmTe, as well as samarium(II) iodide.

Discovered in 1879 by French chemist Paul-Émile Lecoq de Boisbaudran, samarium was named after the mineral samarskite from which it was isolated. The mineral was named after a Russian mine official, Vassili Samarsky-Bykhovets, who thus became the first person to have a chemical element named after him, though the name was indirect.

Samarium occurs in concentration up to 2.8% in several minerals including cerite, gadolinite, samarskite, monazite and bastnäsite, the last two being the most common commercial sources of the element. These minerals are mostly found in China, the United States, Brazil, India, Sri Lanka and Australia; China is by far the world leader in samarium mining and production.

The main commercial use of samarium is in samarium–cobalt magnets, which have permanent magnetization second only to neodymium magnets; however, samarium compounds can withstand significantly higher temperatures, above 700 °C (1,292 °F), without losing their permanent magnetic properties. The radioisotope samarium-153 is the active component of the drug samarium (^{153}Sm) lexidronam (Quadramet), which kills cancer cells in lung cancer, prostate cancer, breast cancer and osteosarcoma. Another isotope, samarium-149, is a strong neutron absorber and so is added to control rods of nuclear reactors. It also forms as a decay product during reactor operation and is one of the important factors considered in reactor design and operation. Other uses of samarium include catalysis of chemical reactions, radioactive dating and X-ray lasers. Samarium(II) iodide, in particular, is a common reducing agent in chemical synthesis.

Samarium has no biological role; some samarium salts are slightly toxic.

== Physical properties ==
Samarium is a rare earth element with a hardness and density similar to zinc. With a boiling point of 1,794 °C (3,261 °F), samarium is the third most volatile lanthanide after ytterbium and europium and comparable in this respect to lead and barium; this helps separation of samarium from its ores. When freshly prepared, samarium has a silvery lustre, and takes on a duller appearance when oxidized in air. Samarium is calculated to have one of the largest atomic radii of the elements; with a radius of 238 pm, only potassium, praseodymium, barium, rubidium and caesium are larger.

In ambient conditions, samarium has a rhombohedral structure (α form). Upon heating to 731 °C (1,348 °F), its crystal symmetry changes to hexagonal close-packed (hcp), though its actual transition temperature depends on the metal purity. Further heating to 922 °C (1,692 °F) transforms the metal into a body-centered cubic (bcc) phase. Heating to 300 °C (572 °F) plus compression to 40 kbar results in a double-hexagonally close-packed structure (dhcp). Higher pressure of the order of hundreds or thousands of kilobars induces a series of phase transformations, in particular with a tetragonal phase appearing at about 900 kbar. In one study, the dhcp phase could be produced without compression, using a nonequilibrium annealing regime with a rapid temperature change between about 400 °C (752 °F) and 700 °C (1,292 °F), confirming the transient character of this samarium phase. Thin films of samarium obtained by vapor deposition may contain the hcp or dhcp phases in ambient conditions.

Samarium and its sesquioxide are paramagnetic at room temperature. Their corresponding effective magnetic moments, below 2 bohr magnetons, are the third-lowest among lanthanides (and their oxides) after lanthanum and lutetium. The metal transforms to an antiferromagnetic state upon cooling to 14.8 K. Individual samarium atoms can be isolated by encapsulating them into fullerene molecules. They can also be intercalated into the interstices of the bulk C_{60} to form a solid solution of nominal composition Sm_{3}C_{60}, which is superconductive at a temperature of 8 K. Samarium doping of iron-based superconductors – a class of high-temperature superconductor – increases their transition to normal conductivity temperature up to 56 K, the highest value achieved so far in this series.

== Chemical properties ==
In air, samarium slowly oxidizes at room temperature and spontaneously ignites at 150 °C (302 °F). Even when stored under mineral oil, samarium gradually oxidizes and develops a grayish-yellow powder of the oxide-hydroxide mixture at the surface. The metallic appearance of a sample can be preserved by sealing it under an inert gas such as argon.

Samarium is quite electropositive and reacts slowly with cold water and rapidly with hot water to form samarium hydroxide:

2Sm_{(s)} + 6H_{2}O_{(l)} → 2Sm(OH)_{3}_{(aq)} + 3H_{2}_{(g)}

Samarium dissolves readily in dilute sulfuric acid to form solutions containing the yellow to pale green Sm(III) ions, which exist as [Sm(OH_{2})_{9}]^{3+} complexes:

2Sm_{(s)} + 3H_{2}SO_{4}_{(aq)} → 2Sm^{3+}_{(aq)} + 3SO^{2−}_{4}_{(aq)} + 3H_{2}_{(g)}

Samarium is one of the few lanthanides with a relatively accessible +2 oxidation state, alongside Eu and Yb. Sm^{2+} ions are blood-red in aqueous solution.

== Compounds ==
Formula	Color	Symmetry	Space group	No.	Pearson symbol	a (pm)	b (pm)	c (pm)	Z	Density, g/cm^{3}
Sm	silvery	trigonal	R3̅m	166	hR9	362.9	362.9	2621.3	9	7.52
Sm	silvery	hexagonal	P6_{3}/mmc	194	hP4	362	362	1168	4	7.54
Sm	silvery	tetragonal	I4/mmm	139	tI2	240.2	240.2	423.1	2	20.46
SmO	golden	cubic	Fm3̅m	225	cF8	494.3	494.3	494.3	4	9.15
Sm_{2}O_{3}		trigonal	P3̅m1	164	hP5	377.8	377.8	594	1	7.89
Sm_{2}O_{3}		monoclinic	C2/m	12	mS30	1418	362.4	885.5	6	7.76
Sm_{2}O_{3}		cubic	Ia3̅	206	cI80	1093	1093	1093	16	7.1
SmH_{2}		cubic	Fm3̅m	225	cF12	537.73	537.73	537.73	4	6.51
SmH_{3}		hexagonal	P3̅c1	165	hP24	377.1	377.1	667.2	6	
Sm_{2}B_{5}	gray	monoclinic	P2_{1}/c	14	mP28	717.9	718	720.5	4	6.49
SmB_{2}		hexagonal	P6/mmm	191	hP3	331	331	401.9	1	7.49
SmB_{4}		tetragonal	P4/mbm	127	tP20	717.9	717.9	406.7	4	6.14
SmB_{6}		cubic	Pm3̅m	221	cP7	413.4	413.4	413.4	1	5.06
SmB_{66}		cubic	Fm3̅c	226	cF1936	2348.7	2348.7	2348.7	24	2.66
Sm_{2}C_{3}		cubic	I4̅3d	220	cI40	839.89	839.89	839.89	8	7.55
SmC_{2}		tetragonal	I4/mmm	139	tI6	377	377	633.1	2	6.44
SmF_{2}	purple	cubic	Fm3̅m	225	cF12	587.1	587.1	587.1	4	6.18
SmF_{3}	white	orthorhombic	Pnma	62	oP16	667.22	705.85	440.43	4	6.64
SmCl_{2}	brown	orthorhombic	Pnma	62	oP12	756.28	450.77	901.09	4	4.79
SmCl_{3}	yellow	hexagonal	P6_{3}/m	176	hP8	737.33	737.33	416.84	2	4.35
SmBr_{2}	brown	orthorhombic	Pnma	62	oP12	797.7	475.4	950.6	4	5.72
SmBr_{3}	yellow	orthorhombic	Cmcm	63	oS16	404	1265	908	2	5.58
SmI_{2}	green	monoclinic	P2_{1}/c	14	mP12					
SmI_{3}	orange	trigonal	R3̅	63	hR24	749	749	2080	6	5.24
SmN		cubic	Fm3̅m	225	cF8	357	357	357	4	8.48
SmP		cubic	Fm3̅m	225	cF8	576	576	576	4	6.3
SmAs		cubic	Fm3̅m	225	cF8	591.5	591.5	591.5	4	7.23

=== Oxides ===
The most stable oxide of samarium is the sesquioxide Sm_{2}O_{3}. Like many samarium compounds, it exists in several crystalline phases. The trigonal form is obtained by slow cooling from the melt. The melting point of Sm_{2}O_{3} is high (2345 °C), so it is usually melted not by direct heating, but with induction heating, through a radio-frequency coil. Sm_{2}O_{3} crystals of monoclinic symmetry can be grown by the flame fusion method (Verneuil process) from Sm_{2}O_{3} powder, that yields cylindrical boules up to several centimeters long and about one centimeter in diameter. The boules are transparent when pure and defect-free and are orange otherwise. Heating the metastable trigonal Sm_{2}O_{3} to 1,900 °C (3,450 °F) converts it to the more stable monoclinic phase. Cubic Sm_{2}O_{3} has also been described.

Samarium is one of the few lanthanides that form a monoxide, SmO. This lustrous golden-yellow compound was obtained by reducing Sm_{2}O_{3} with samarium metal at high temperature (1000 °C) and a pressure above 50 kbar; lowering the pressure resulted in incomplete reaction. SmO has cubic rock-salt lattice structure.

=== Chalcogenides ===
Samarium forms a trivalent sulfide, selenide and telluride. Divalent chalcogenides SmS, SmSe and SmTe with a cubic rock-salt crystal structure are known. These chalcogenides convert from a semiconducting to metallic state at room temperature upon application of pressure. Whereas the transition is continuous and occurs at about 20–30 kbar in SmSe and SmTe, it is abrupt in SmS and requires only 6.5 kbar. This effect results in a spectacular color change in SmS from black to golden yellow when its crystals of films are scratched or polished. The transition does not change the lattice symmetry, but there is a sharp decrease (~15%) in the crystal volume. It exhibits hysteresis, i.e., when the pressure is released, SmS returns to the semiconducting state at a much lower pressure of about 0.4 kbar.

=== Halides ===
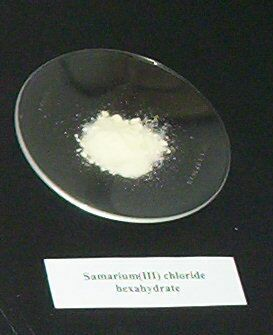
Samarium trichloride

Samarium metal reacts with all the halogens, forming trihalides:

2 Sm (s) + 3 X_{2} (g) → 2 SmX_{3} (s) (X = F, Cl, Br or I)

Their further reduction with samarium, lithium or sodium metals at elevated temperatures (about 700–900 °C) yields the dihalides. The diiodide can also be prepared by heating SmI_{3}, or by reacting the metal with 1,2-diiodoethane in anhydrous tetrahydrofuran at room temperature:

Sm (s) + ICH_{2}-CH_{2}I → SmI_{2} + CH_{2}=CH_{2}.

In addition to dihalides, the reduction also produces many non-stoichiometric samarium halides with a well-defined crystal structure, such as Sm_{3}F_{7}, Sm_{14}F_{33}, Sm_{27}F_{64}, Sm_{11}Br_{24}, Sm_{5}Br_{11} and Sm_{6}Br_{13}.

Samarium halides change their crystal structures when one type of halide anion is substituted for another, which is an uncommon behavior for most elements (e.g. actinides). Many halides have two major crystal phases for one composition, one being significantly more stable and another being metastable. The latter is formed upon compression or heating, followed by quenching to ambient conditions. For example, compressing the usual monoclinic samarium diiodide and releasing the pressure results in a PbCl_{2}-type orthorhombic structure (density 5.90 g/cm^{3}), and similar treatment results in a new phase of samarium triiodide (density 5.97 g/cm^{3}).

=== Borides ===
Sintering powders of samarium oxide and boron, in a vacuum, yields a powder containing several samarium boride phases; the ratio between these phases can be controlled through the mixing proportion. The powder can be converted into larger crystals of samarium borides using arc melting or zone melting techniques, relying on the different melting/crystallization temperature of SmB_{6} (2580 °C), SmB_{4} (about 2300 °C) and SmB_{66} (2150 °C). All these materials are hard, brittle, dark-gray solids with the hardness increasing with the boron content. Samarium diboride is too volatile to be produced with these methods and requires high pressure (about 65 kbar) and low temperatures between 1140 and 1240 °C to stabilize its growth. Increasing the temperature results in the preferential formation of SmB_{6}.

==== Samarium hexaboride ====
Samarium hexaboride is a typical intermediate-valence compound where samarium is present both as Sm^{2+} and Sm^{3+} ions in a 3:7 ratio. It belongs to a class of Kondo insulators; at temperatures above 50 K, its properties are typical of a Kondo metal, with metallic electrical conductivity characterized by strong electron scattering, whereas at lower temperatures, it behaves as a non-magnetic insulator with a narrow band gap of about 4–14 meV. The cooling-induced metal-insulator transition in SmB_{6} is accompanied by a sharp increase in the thermal conductivity, peaking at about 15 K. The reason for this increase is that electrons themselves do not contribute to the thermal conductivity at low temperatures, which is dominated by phonons, but the decrease in electron concentration reduces the rate of electron-phonon scattering.

=== Other inorganic compounds ===
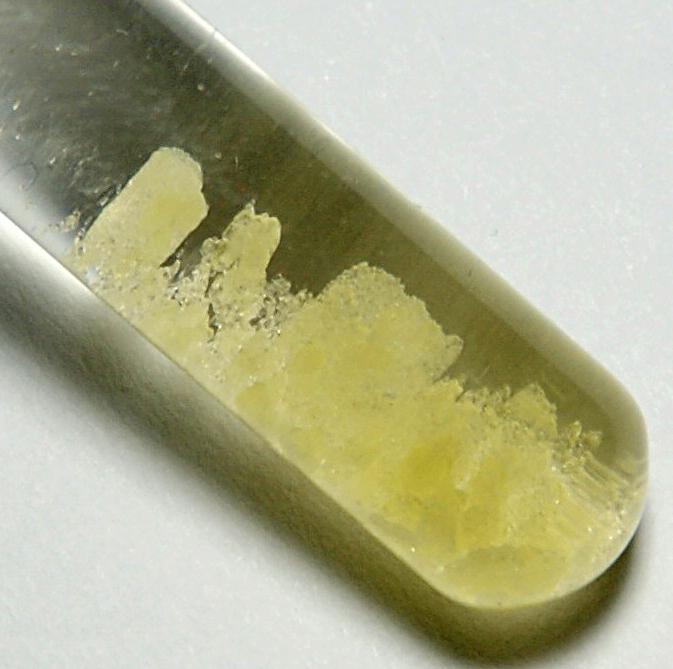
Samarium sulfate, Sm_{2}(SO_{4})_{3}

Samarium carbides are prepared by melting a graphite-metal mixture in an inert atmosphere. After the synthesis, they are unstable in air and need to be studied under an inert atmosphere. Samarium monophosphide SmP is a semiconductor with a bandgap of 1.10 eV, the same as in silicon, and electrical conductivity of n-type. It can be prepared by annealing at 1,100 °C (2,010 °F) an evacuated quartz ampoule containing mixed powders of phosphorus and samarium. Phosphorus is highly volatile at high temperatures and may explode, thus the heating rate has to be kept well below 1 °C/min. A similar procedure is adopted for the monarsenide SmAs, but the synthesis temperature is higher at 1,800 °C (3,270 °F).

Numerous crystalline binary compounds are known for samarium and one of the group 14, 15, or 16 elements X, where X is Si, Ge, Sn, Pb, Sb or Te, and metallic alloys of samarium form another large group. They are all prepared by annealing mixed powders of the corresponding elements. Many of the resulting compounds are non-stoichiometric and have nominal compositions Sm_{a}X_{b}, where the b/a ratio varies between 0.5 and 3.

=== Organometallic compounds ===
Samarium forms a cyclopentadienide Sm(C_{5}H_{5})_{3} and its chloroderivatives Sm(C_{5}H_{5})_{2}Cl and Sm(C_{5}H_{5})Cl_{2}. They are prepared by reacting samarium trichloride with NaC_{5}H_{5} in tetrahydrofuran. Contrary to cyclopentadienides of most other lanthanides, in Sm(C_{5}H_{5})_{3} some C_{5}H_{5} rings bridge each other by forming ring vertexes η^{1} or edges η^{2} toward another neighboring samarium, thus creating polymeric chains. The chloroderivative Sm(C_{5}H_{5})_{2}Cl has a dimer structure, which is more accurately expressed as (η(_{5})−C_{5}H_{5})_{2}Sm(−Cl)_{2}(η(_{5})−C_{5}H_{5})_{2}. There, the chlorine bridges can be replaced, for instance, by iodine, hydrogen or nitrogen atoms or by CN groups.

The (C_{5}H_{5})^{−} ion in samarium cyclopentadienides can be replaced by the indenide (C_{9}H_{7})^{−} or cyclooctatetraenide (C_{8}H_{8})^{2−} ring, resulting in Sm(C_{9}H_{7})_{3} or KSm(η(_{8})−C_{8}H_{8})_{2}. The latter compound has a structure similar to uranocene. There is also a cyclopentadienide of divalent samarium, Sm(C_{5}H_{5})_{2} a solid that sublimates at about 85 °C (185 °F). Contrary to ferrocene, the C_{5}H_{5} rings in Sm(C_{5}H_{5})_{2} are not parallel but are tilted by 40°.

A metathesis reaction in tetrahydrofuran or ether gives alkyls and aryls of samarium:

SmCl_{3} + 3LiR → SmR_{3} + 3LiCl
Sm(OR)_{3} + 3LiCH(SiMe_{3})_{2} → Sm{CH(SiMe_{3})_{2}}_{3} + 3LiOR

Here R is a hydrocarbon group and Me = methyl.

== Isotopes ==
Naturally occurring samarium is composed of five stable isotopes: ^{144}Sm, ^{149}Sm, ^{150}Sm, ^{152}Sm and ^{154}Sm, and two extremely long-lived radioisotopes, ^{147}Sm (half-life t_{1/2} = 1.066×10^{11} years) and ^{148}Sm (6.3×10^{15} years), with ^{152}Sm being the most abundant (26.75%). ^{149}Sm is listed by various sources as being stable, but some sources state that it is radioactive; the lower bound on its half-life is 2×10^{15} years. Some observationally stable samarium isotopes are predicted to decay to isotopes of neodymium. The long-lived isotopes ^{146}Sm, ^{147}Sm, and ^{148}Sm (and ^{149}Sm if it decays) undergo alpha decay to neodymium isotopes. Lighter unstable isotopes of samarium mainly decay by electron capture to promethium, while heavier ones beta decay to europium. The known isotopes range from ^{129}Sm to ^{168}Sm. The half-lives of ^{151}Sm and ^{145}Sm are 94.6 years and 340 days, respectively. All remaining radioisotopes have half-lives that are less than 2 days, and most these have half-life less than 48 seconds. Natural samarium has a radioactivity of 127 Bq/g, mostly due to ^{147}Sm, whose alpha decay to ^{143}Nd is used in samarium–neodymium dating. ^{146}Sm is an extinct radionuclide, with the half-life of 9.2×10^{7} years. There have been searches of samarium-146 as a primordial nuclide, because its half-life is long enough such that minute quantities of the element should persist today. It can be used in radiometric dating.

Samarium-149 is an observationally stable isotope of samarium and a product of the decay chain from the fission product ^{149}Nd (yield 1.0888%). ^{149}Sm is a significant neutron absorber in nuclear reactors, with a neutron poison effect that is second in importance for reactor design and operation only to ^{135}Xe. Its neutron cross section is 41000 barns for thermal neutrons. Because samarium-149 is not radioactive and is not removed by decay, it presents problems somewhat different from those encountered with xenon-135. The equilibrium concentration (and thus the poisoning effect) builds to an equilibrium value during reactor operations in about 500 hours (about three weeks) as the isotope does not measurably vanish except through neutron capture.

Chemical structure of Sm-EDTMP

Samarium-153 is a beta emitter with a half-life of 46.285 hours. It is used to kill cancer cells in lung cancer, prostate cancer, breast cancer, and osteosarcoma. For this purpose, samarium-153 is chelated with ethylene diamine tetramethylene phosphonate (EDTMP) and injected intravenously. The chelation prevents accumulation of radioactive samarium in the body that would result in excessive irradiation and generation of new cancer cells. The corresponding drug has several names including samarium (^{153}Sm) lexidronam; its trade name is Quadramet.

== History ==
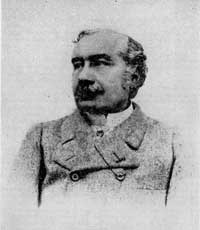
Paul Émile Lecoq de Boisbaudran, the discoverer of samarium

Detection of samarium and related elements was announced by several scientists in the second half of the 19th century; however, most sources give priority to French chemist Paul-Émile Lecoq de Boisbaudran. Boisbaudran isolated samarium oxide and/or hydroxide in Paris in 1879 from the mineral samarskite ((Y,Ce,U,Fe)_{3}(Nb,Ta,Ti)_{5}O_{16}) and identified a new element in it via sharp optical absorption lines. Swiss chemist Marc Delafontaine announced a new element decipium (from Latin: decipiens meaning "deceptive, misleading") in 1878, but later in 1880–1881 demonstrated that it was a mix of several elements, one being identical to Boisbaudran's samarium. Though samarskite was first found in the Ural Mountains in Russia, by the late 1870s it had been found in other places, making it available to many researchers. In particular, it was found that the samarium isolated by Boisbaudran was also impure and had a comparable amount of europium. The pure samarium(III) oxide was produced only in 1901 by Eugène-Anatole Demarçay, and in 1903 Wilhelm Muthmann isolated the element.

Boisbaudran named his element samarium after the mineral samarskite, which in turn honored Vassili Samarsky-Bykhovets (1803–1870). Samarsky-Bykhovets, as the Chief of Staff of the Russian Corps of Mining Engineers, had granted access for two German mineralogists, the brothers Gustav and Heinrich Rose, to study the mineral samples from the Urals. Samarium was thus the first chemical element to be named after a person. The word samaria is sometimes used to mean samarium(III) oxide, by analogy with yttria, zirconia, alumina, ceria, holmia, etc. The symbol Sm was suggested for samarium, but an alternative Sa was often used instead until the 1920s.

Before the advent of ion-exchange separation technology in the 1950s, pure samarium had no commercial uses. However, a by-product of fractional crystallization purification of neodymium was a mix of samarium and gadolinium that got the name "Lindsay Mix" after the company that made it, and was used for nuclear control rods in some early nuclear reactors. Nowadays, a similar commodity product has the name "samarium-europium-gadolinium" (SEG) concentrate. It is prepared by solvent extraction from the mixed lanthanides isolated from bastnäsite (or monazite). Since heavier lanthanides have more affinity for the solvent used, they are easily extracted from the bulk using relatively small proportions of solvent. Not all rare-earth producers who process bastnäsite do so on a large enough scale to continue by separating the components of SEG, which typically makes up only 1–2% of the original ore. Such producers therefore make SEG with a view to marketing it to the specialized processors. In this manner, the valuable europium in the ore is rescued for use in making phosphor. Samarium purification follows the removal of the europium. As of 2012, being in oversupply, samarium oxide is cheaper on a commercial scale than its relative abundance in the ore might suggest.

== Occurrence and production ==
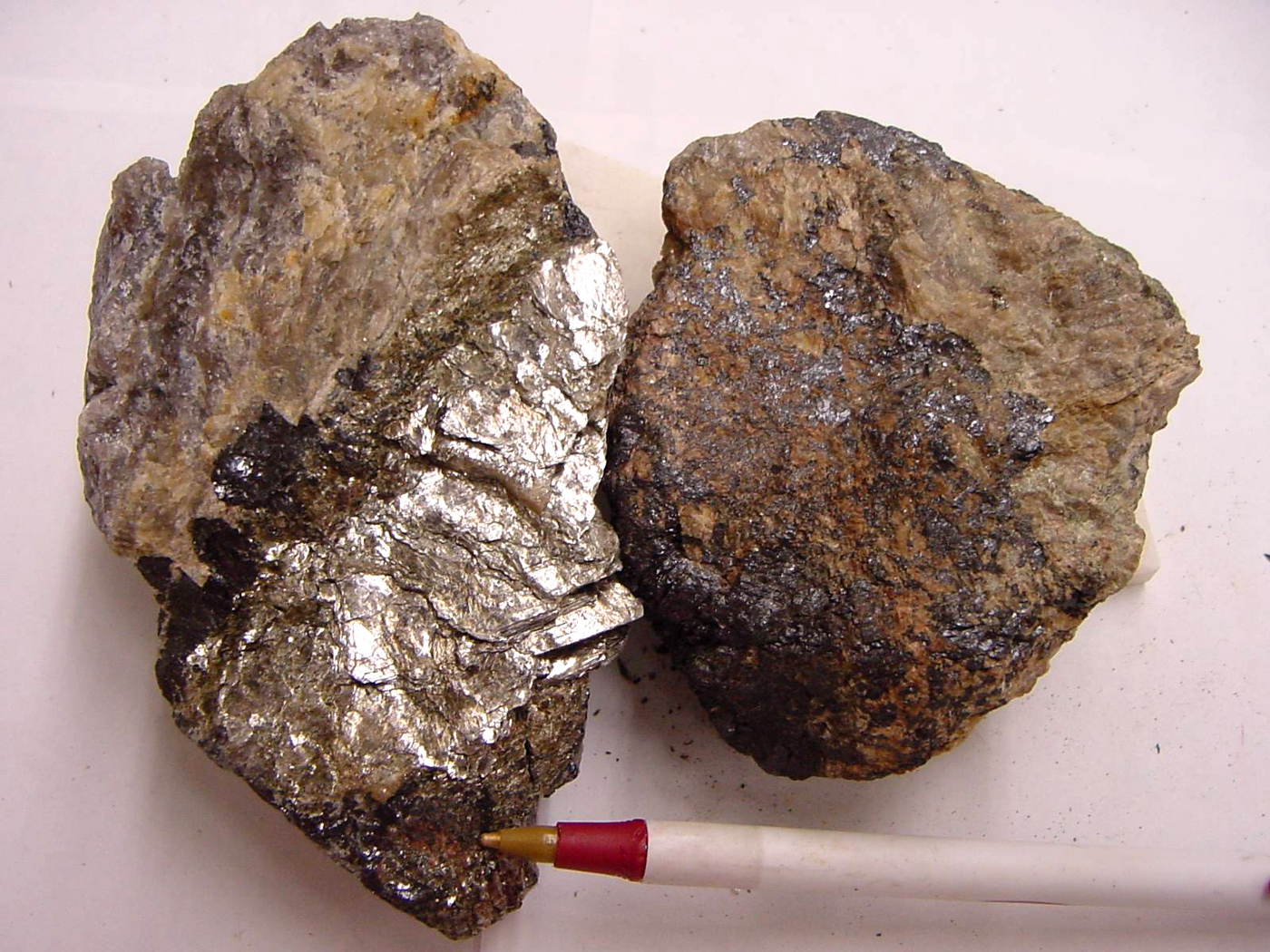
Samarskite

Samarium concentration in soils varies between 2 and 23 ppm, and oceans contain about 0.5–0.8 parts per trillion. The median value for its abundance in the Earth's crust used by the CRC Handbook is 7 parts per million (ppm) and is the 40th most abundant element. Distribution of samarium in soils strongly depends on its chemical state and is very inhomogeneous: in sandy soils, samarium concentration is about 200 times higher at the surface of soil particles than in the water trapped between them, and this ratio can exceed 1,000 in clays.

Samarium is not found free in nature, but, like other rare earth elements, is contained in many minerals, including monazite, bastnäsite, cerite, gadolinite and samarskite; monazite (in which samarium occurs at concentrations of up to 2.8%) and bastnäsite are mostly used as commercial sources. World resources of samarium are estimated at two million tonnes; they are mostly located in China, US, Brazil, India, Sri Lanka and Australia, and the annual production is about 700 tonnes. Country production reports are usually given for all rare-earth metals combined. By far, China has the largest production with 120,000 tonnes mined per year; it is followed by the US (about 5,000 tonnes) and India (2,700 tonnes). Samarium is usually sold as oxide, which at the price of about US$30/kg is one of the cheapest lanthanide oxides. Whereas mischmetal – a mixture of rare earth metals containing about 1% of samarium – has long been used, relatively pure samarium has been isolated only recently, through ion exchange processes, solvent extraction techniques, and electrochemical deposition. The metal is often prepared by electrolysis of a molten mixture of samarium(III) chloride with sodium chloride or calcium chloride. Samarium can also be obtained by reducing its oxide with lanthanum. The product is then distilled to separate samarium (boiling point 1,794 °C) and lanthanum (b.p. 3,464 °C).

Very few minerals have samarium being the most dominant element. Minerals with essential (dominant) samarium include monazite-(Sm) and florencite-(Sm). These minerals are very rare and are usually found containing other elements, usually cerium or neodymium. It is also made by neutron capture by samarium-149, which is added to the control rods of nuclear reactors. Therefore, ^{151}Sm is present in spent nuclear fuel and radioactive waste.

Separating samarium from minerals involves nearly 100 individual processes and extremely strong acids.

=== Geopolitics ===
Western militaries across the world relied on a single samarium production plant in La Rochelle, France from the 1970s until the plant's closure in 1994. The facility sourced its samarium from Australia. A $1 billion United States government effort to re-open a closed rare earths mine in Mountain Pass, California resulted in the facility going bankrupt.

As of 2025, China produces all of the world's usable samarium; refining is concentrated in Baotou. The Biden administration signed two contracts for samarium production plants in the United States, but neither materialized. During US president Donald Trump's second-term tariff war, China leveled strict limits on the export of samarium, among other rare earth metals, as part of the long-running rare earths trade dispute (and larger trade war) between the two nations.

== Applications ==
=== Magnets ===
An important use of samarium is samarium–cobalt magnets, which are nominally SmCo_{5} or Sm_{2}Co_{17}. They have high permanent magnetization, about 10,000 times that of iron and second only to neodymium magnets. However, samarium magnets resist demagnetization better; they are stable to temperatures above 700 °C (1,292 °F) (cf. 300–400 °C for neodymium magnets). These magnets are found in small motors, headphones, and high-end magnetic pickups for guitars and related musical instruments. For example, they are used in the motors of a solar-powered electric aircraft, the Solar Challenger, and in the Samarium Cobalt Noiseless electric guitar and bass pickups.

Due to their heat resistance, samarium magnets are also used for military applications and are needed to manufacture modern aircraft and missiles. A single F-35 fighter jet contains about 50 pounds (23 kg) of samarium magnets.

=== Chemical reagent ===
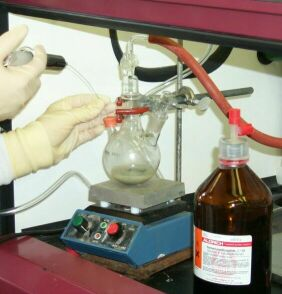
Barbier reaction using SmI_{2}

Samarium and its compounds are important as catalysts and chemical reagents. Samarium catalysts help the decomposition of plastics, dechlorination of pollutants such as polychlorinated biphenyls (PCB), as well as dehydration and dehydrogenation of ethanol. Samarium(III) triflate Sm(OTf)_{3}, that is Sm(CF_{3}SO_{3})_{3}, is one of the most efficient Lewis acid catalysts for a halogen-promoted Friedel–Crafts reaction with alkenes. Samarium(II) iodide is a very common reducing and coupling agent in organic synthesis, for example in desulfonylation reactions; annulation; Danishefsky, Kuwajima, Mukaiyama and Holton Taxol total syntheses; strychnine total synthesis; Barbier reaction and other reductions with samarium(II) iodide.

In its usual oxidized form, samarium is added to ceramics and glasses where it increases absorption of infrared light. As a (minor) part of mischmetal, samarium is found in the "flint" ignition devices of many lighters and torches.

=== Neutron absorber ===
Samarium-149 has a high cross section for neutron capture (41,000 barns) and so is used in control rods of nuclear reactors. Its advantage compared to competing materials, such as boron and cadmium, is stability of absorption – most of the fusion products of ^{149}Sm are other isotopes of samarium that are also good neutron absorbers. For example, the cross section of samarium-151 is 15,000 barns, it is on the order of hundreds of barns for ^{150}Sm, ^{152}Sm, and ^{153}Sm, and 6,800 barns for natural (mixed-isotope) samarium.

=== Lasers ===
Samarium-doped calcium fluoride crystals were used as an active medium in one of the first solid-state lasers designed and built by Peter Sorokin (co-inventor of the dye laser) and Mirek Stevenson at IBM research labs in early 1961. This samarium laser gave pulses of red light at 708.5 nm. It had to be cooled by liquid helium and so did not find practical applications. Another samarium-based laser became the first saturated X-ray laser operating at wavelengths shorter than 10 nanometers. It gave 50-picosecond pulses at 7.3 and 6.8 nm suitable for uses in holography, high-resolution microscopy of biological specimens, deflectometry, interferometry, and radiography of dense plasmas related to confinement fusion and astrophysics. Saturated operation meant that the maximum possible power was extracted from the lasing medium, resulting in the high peak energy of 0.3 mJ. The active medium was samarium plasma produced by irradiating samarium-coated glass with a pulsed infrared Nd-glass laser (wavelength ~1.05 μm).

=== Storage phosphor ===
In 2007 it was shown that nanocrystalline BaFCl:Sm^{3+} as prepared by co-precipitation can serve as a very efficient X-ray storage phosphor. The co-precipitation leads to nanocrystallites of the order of 100–200 nm in size and their sensitivity as X-ray storage phosphors is increased a remarkable ~500,000 times because of the specific arrangements and density of defect centers in comparison with microcrystalline samples prepared by sintering at high temperature. The mechanism is based on reduction of Sm^{3+} to Sm^{2+} by trapping electrons that are created upon exposure to ionizing radiation in the BaFCl host. The ^{5}D_{J}–^{7}F_{J} f–f luminescence lines can be very efficiently excited via the parity allowed 4f^{6}→4f^{5}5d transition at ~417 nm. The latter wavelength is ideal for efficient excitation by blue-violet laser diodes as the transition is electric dipole allowed and thus relatively intense (400 L/(mol⋅cm)). The phosphor has potential applications in personal dosimetry, dosimetry and imaging in radiotherapy, and medical imaging.

=== Non-commercial and potential uses ===
- The change in electrical resistivity in samarium monochalcogenides can be used in a pressure sensor or in a memory device triggered between a low-resistance and high-resistance state by external pressure, and such devices are being developed commercially. Samarium monosulfide also generates electric voltage upon moderate heating to about 150 °C (302 °F) that can be applied in thermoelectric power converters.
- Analysis of relative concentrations of samarium and neodymium isotopes ^{147}Sm, ^{144}Nd, and ^{143}Nd allows determination of the age and origin of rocks and meteorites in samarium–neodymium dating. Both elements are lanthanides and are very similar physically and chemically. Thus, Sm–Nd dating is either insensitive to partitioning of the marker elements during various geologic processes, or such partitioning can well be understood and modeled from the ionic radii of said elements.
- The Sm^{3+} ion is a potential activator for use in warm-white light emitting diodes. It offers high luminous efficacy due to narrow emission bands; but the generally low quantum efficiency and too little absorption in the UV-A to blue spectral region hinders commercial application.
- Samarium is used for ionosphere testing. A rocket spreads samarium monoxide as a red vapor at high altitude, and researchers test how the atmosphere disperses it and how it impacts radio transmissions.
- Samarium hexaboride, SmB_{6}, is both a topological insulator and a Kondo insulator with potential for use in spin-based electronics.

== Biological role and precautions ==
Samarium
Hazards
- GHS labelling
Pictograms	(GHS02: Flammable)
Signal word	Warning
Hazard statements	H261
Precautionary statements	P231+P232, P280, P370+P378, P501
NFPA 704 (fire diamond)	2 3 2 W

Samarium salts stimulate metabolism, but it is unclear whether this is from samarium or other lanthanides present with it. The total amount of samarium in adults is about 50 μg, mostly in liver and kidneys and with ~8 μg/L being dissolved in blood. Samarium is not absorbed by plants to a measurable concentration and so is normally not part of human diet. However, a few plants and vegetables may contain up to 1 part per million of samarium. Insoluble salts of samarium are non-toxic and the soluble ones are only slightly toxic. When ingested, only 0.05% of samarium salts are absorbed into the bloodstream and the remainder are excreted. From the blood, 45% goes to the liver and 45% is deposited on the surface of the bones where it remains for 10 years; the remaining 10% is excreted.

== Bibliography ==
- Greenwood, Norman N.; Earnshaw, Alan (1997). Chemistry of the Elements (2nd ed.). Butterworth–Heinemann. ISBN 978-0-08-037941-8.
