= Praseodymium(III) hydroxide =

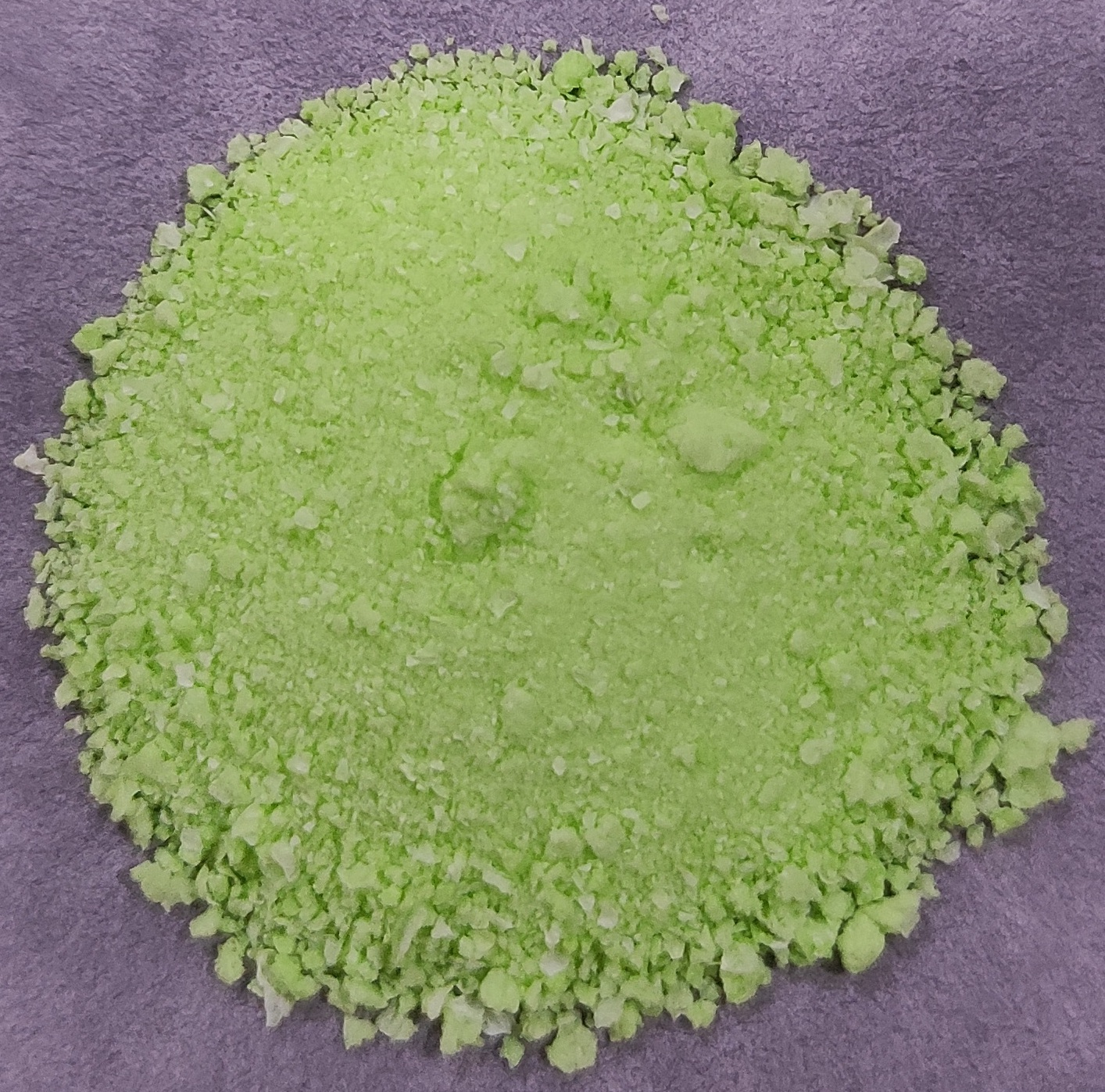

Identifiers
CAS Number	16469-16-2
3D model (JSmol)	Interactive image
ChemSpider	77046
ECHA InfoCard	100.036.815
EC Number	240-513-9
PubChem CID	85432
CompTox Dashboard (EPA)	DTXSID20936978
- InChI: InChI=1S/3H2O.Pr/h3*1H2;/q;;;+3/p-3 Key: ZLGIGTLMMBTXIY-UHFFFAOYSA-K
- SMILES: [Pr+3].[OH-].[OH-].[OH-]

Properties
Chemical formula	Pr(OH)_{3}
Molar mass	191.932
Appearance	green solid
Melting point	220 °C (493 K)（dissolves）
Solubility in water	Virtually insoluble in water
Solubility product (K_{sp})	3.39×10^{−24}

Related compounds
Other anions	Praseodymium(III) oxide
Other cations	Cerium(III) hydroxide Neodymium(III) hydroxide
- Except where otherwise noted, data are given for materials in their standard state (at 25 °C [77 °F], 100 kPa). Infobox references

Praseodymium(III) hydroxide is an inorganic compound with a chemical formula Pr(OH)_{3}.

== Production ==
The reaction between ammonia water and praseodymium(III) nitrate produces praseodymium(III) hydroxide:

Pr(NO_{3})_{3} + 3 NH_{3}·H_{2}O → Pr(OH)_{3}↓ + 3 NH_{4}NO_{3}

== Chemical properties ==
Praseodymium(III) hydroxide can react with acid and produce praseodymium salts:

Pr(OH)_{3} + 3 H^{+} → Pr^{3+} + 3 H_{2}O, for example;

Pr(OH)_{3} + 3CH_{3}COOH forms Pr(CH_{3}CO_{2})_{3} + 3H_{2}O;

Praseodymium(III) hydroxide + Acetic acid forms praseodymium(III) acetate and water.
