= Praseodymium(IV) oxide =

Praseodymium dioxide
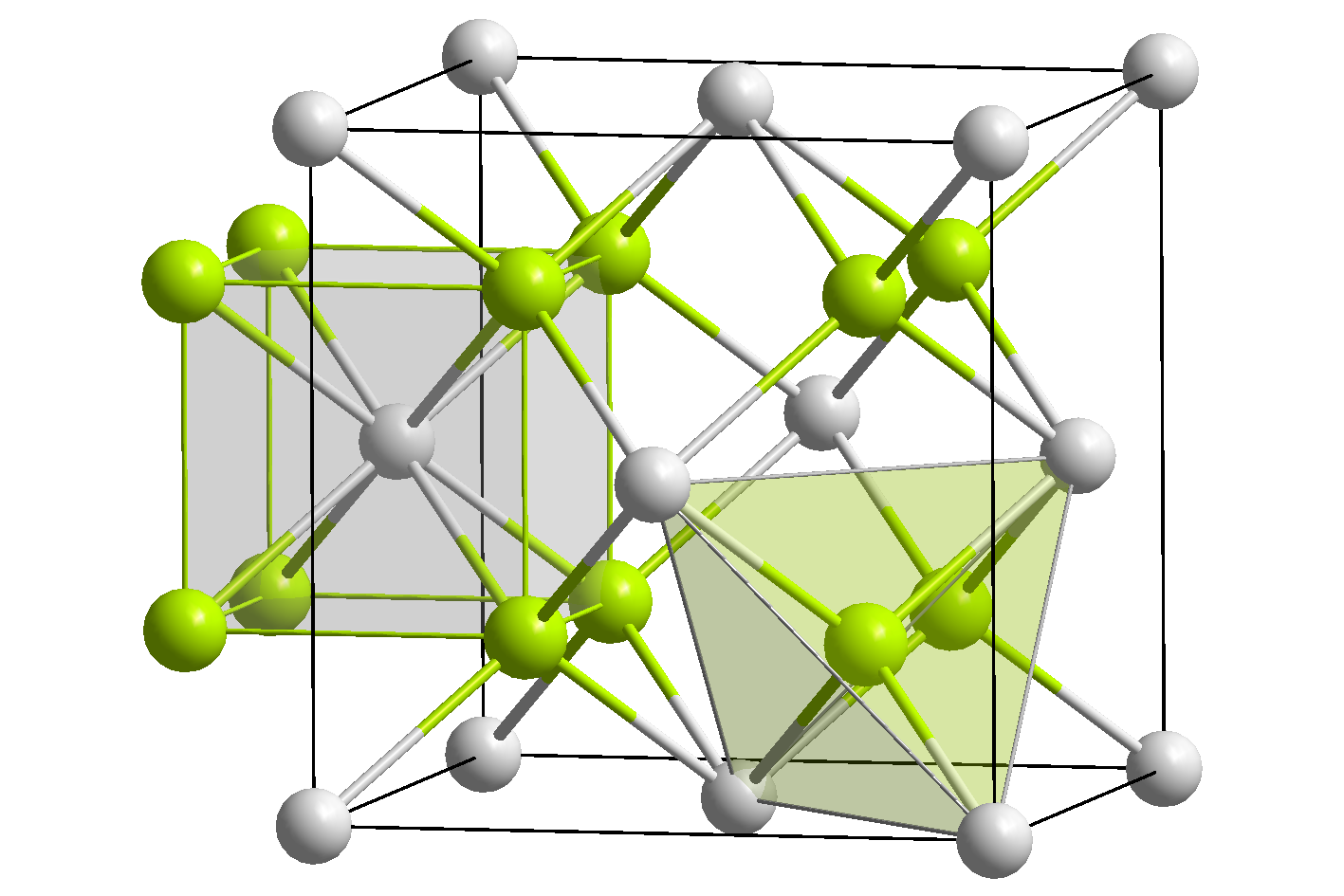

Names
- IUPAC name Praseodymium(IV) oxide

Identifiers
CAS Number	12036-05-4
3D model (JSmol)	Interactive image
ChemSpider	74758
ECHA InfoCard	100.031.658
EC Number	234-838-5
PubChem CID	82846
CompTox Dashboard (EPA)	DTXSID0065191
- InChI: InChI=1S/2O.Pr Key: BOWRJOSABXTXBI-UHFFFAOYSA-N
- SMILES: O=[Pr]=O

Properties
Chemical formula	PrO_{2}
Molar mass	172.91
Appearance	Dark brownish crystal

Structure
Crystal structure	Fluorite structure
Space group	Fm3̅m (No. 225)
Lattice constant	a = 539.3 pm
Formula units (Z)	4

Related compounds
Related compounds	Praseodymium(III) oxide Praseodymium(III,IV) oxide
- Except where otherwise noted, data are given for materials in their standard state (at 25 °C [77 °F], 100 kPa). Infobox references

Praseodymium(IV) oxide is an inorganic compound with chemical formula PrO_{2}.

== Production ==
Praseodymium(IV) oxide can be produced by boiling Pr_{6}O_{11} in water or acetic acid:

Pr_{6}O_{11} + 3 H_{2}O → 4 PrO_{2} + 2 Pr(OH)_{3}

== Chemical reactions ==
Praseodymium(IV) oxide starts to decompose at 320~360 °C, liberating oxygen.
