= Praseodymium(III,IV) oxide =

Names
- IUPAC name Praseodymium(III,IV) oxide

Identifiers
CAS Number	12037-29-5
3D model (JSmol)	Interactive image
ChemSpider	17339476
ECHA InfoCard	100.031.676
EC Number	234-857-9
PubChem CID	16211481
CompTox Dashboard (EPA)	DTXSID20894261
- InChI: InChI=1S/11O.6Pr Key: AICMLAQRDYRMRP-UHFFFAOYSA-N
- SMILES: O=[Pr]=O.O=[Pr]=O.O=[Pr]=O.O=[Pr]=O.O=[Pr]O[Pr]=O

Properties
Chemical formula	Pr_{6}O_{11}
Molar mass	1021.44 g/mol
Appearance	dark brown powder
Density	6.5 g/mL
Melting point	2,183 °C (3,961 °F; 2,456 K).
Boiling point	3,760 °C (6,800 °F; 4,030 K)

Hazards
- GHS labelling
Pictograms	(GHS07: Exclamation mark)
Signal word	Warning
Hazard statements	H315, H319, H335
Precautionary statements	P261, P305+P351+P338
- Lethal dose or concentration (LD, LC)
LD_{50} (median dose)	5000 mg·kg^{−1} Rat oral
- Except where otherwise noted, data are given for materials in their standard state (at 25 °C [77 °F], 100 kPa). Infobox references

Praseodymium(III,IV) oxide is the inorganic compound with the formula Pr_{6}O_{11} that is insoluble in water. It has a cubic fluorite structure. It is the most stable form of praseodymium oxide at ambient temperature and pressure.

== Properties and structure ==
Pr_{6}O_{11} adopts a cubic fluorite crystal structure, measured by XRD, TEM and SEM methods. It can be considered an oxygen deficient form of praseodymium(IV) oxide (PrO_{2}), with the Pr ions being in a mixed valency state Pr(III) and Pr(IV). This characteristic is what gives the oxide its many useful properties for its catalytic activity.

== Synthesis ==
Praseodymium oxide nanoparticles are generally produced via solid-state methods such as thermolysis, molten salt method, calcination or precipitation. Practically all processes, however, contain a calcination step in order to obtain a crystalline Pr_{6}O_{11} nanoparticles.

=== Calcination ===
Typically, praseodymium nitrate Pr(NO_{3})_{3}·6H_{2}O or praseodymium hydroxide Pr(OH)_{3} is heated at high temperatures (usually above 500 °C) under air to give praseodymium(III,IV) oxide. While less common, synthesis from other organic precursors such as praseodymium acetate, oxalate and malonate have also been reported in chemical literature.

The physical properties of the prepared nanoparticles such as particle shape or lattice parameter depend strongly on the conditions of calcination, such as the temperature or duration, as well as the different preparation methods (calcination, sol-gel, precipitation, for example). As a result, many synthesis routes have been explored to obtain the precise morphology desired.

== Uses ==
Praseodymium(III,IV) oxide has a number of potential applications in chemical catalysis, and is often used in conjunction with a promoter such as sodium or gold to improve its catalytic performance. It has a high-K dielectric constant of around 30 and very low leakage currents which have also made it a promising material for many potential applications in nanodevices and microelectronics.

=== Oxidative coupling of methane ===
Sodium or lithium promoted praseodymium(III,IV) oxide displays good conversion rate of methane with a good selectivity towards ethane and ethene as opposed to unwanted byproducts such as carbon dioxide. While the precise mechanism for this reaction is still under debate, it has been proposed that typically, methane is activated to a methyl radical by oxygen on the surface of the catalyst which combines to form ethane. Ethene is then formed by reduction of ethane either by the catalyst or spontaneously. The multiple oxidation states of Pr(III) and Pr(IV) allows rapid regeneration of the active catalyst species involving a peroxide anion O^{2−}_{2}.

This reaction is of particular interest as it enables the conversion of abundant methane gas (composing up to 60% of natural gas) into higher order hydrocarbons, which provide more applications. As a result, the oxidative coupling of methane is an economically desirable process.

=== CO oxidation ===
In the proposed mechanism for Pr_{6}O_{11}–catalysed oxidation of CO to CO_{2}, CO first binds to the catalyst surface to create a bidentate carbonate then converted to a monodentate carbonate species which can decompose as CO_{2}, completing the catalyst cycle. The conversion of a bidentate carbonate to a monodentate species leaves an oxygen vacancy on the catalyst surface which can quickly be filled due to the high oxygen mobility deriving from the mixed oxidation states of Pr centres. This proposed mechanism is presented schematically below, adapted from Borchert, et al.

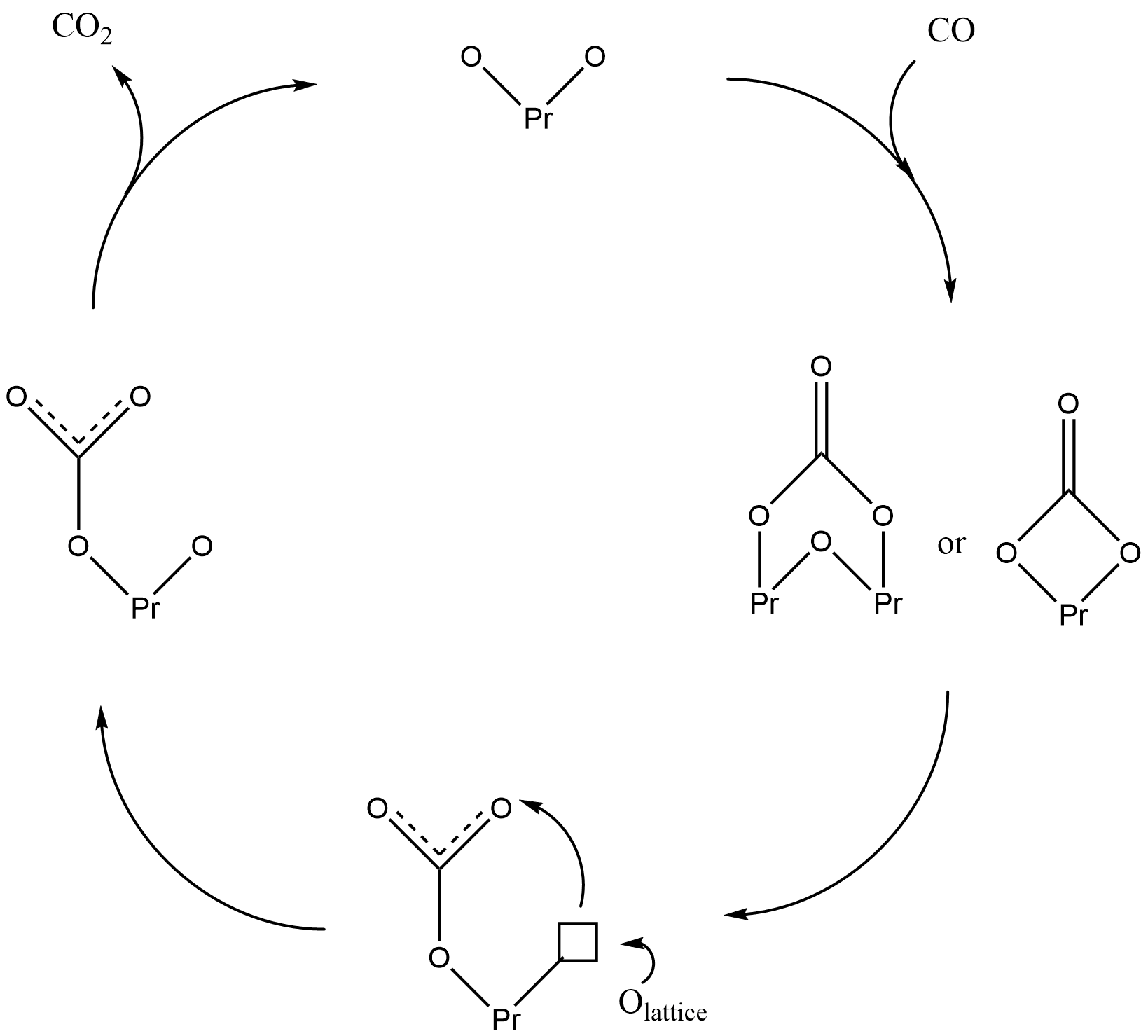
Praseodymium oxide-catalyzed CO oxidation mechanism

Addition of gold promoters to the catalyst may significantly lower the reaction temperature from 550 °C to 140 °C, but the mechanism is yet to be discovered. It is believed that there is a certain synergistic effect between gold and praseodymium(III,IV) oxide species.

The interest in CO oxidation lies in its ability to convert toxic CO gas to non-toxic CO_{2} and has applications in car exhaust, for example, which emits CO.

Pr_{6}O_{11} is also used in conjunction with other additives such as silica or zircon to produce pigments for use in ceramics and glass.
