= Samarskite-(Y) =

Rare earth oxide mineral

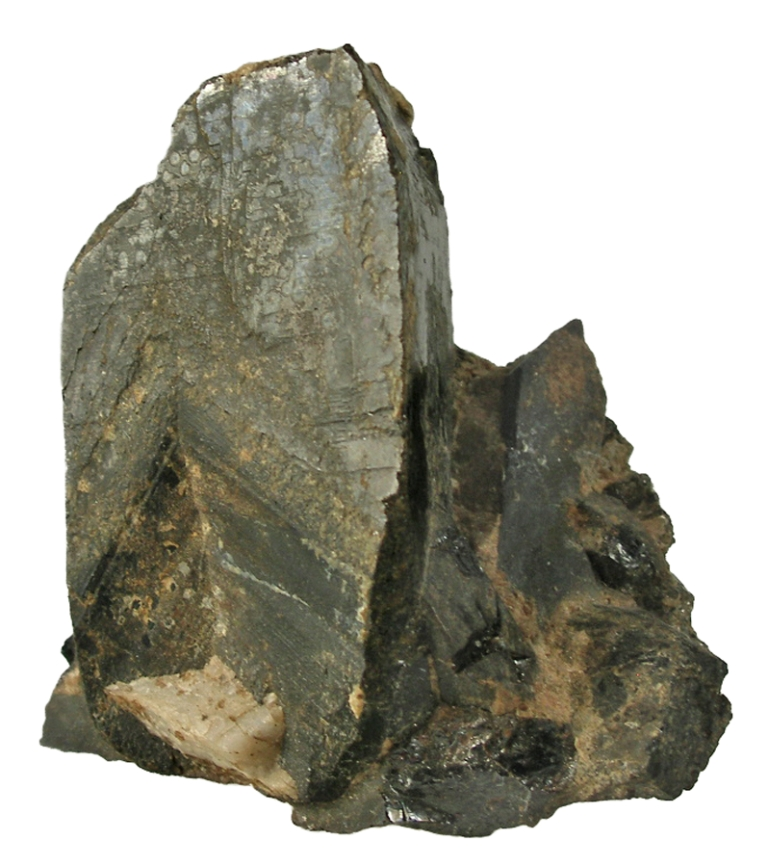

General
- Category: Oxide minerals
- Formula: (YFe^{3+}Fe^{2+}U,Th,Ca)_{2}(Nb,Ta)_{2}O_{8}
- IMA symbol: Smk-Y
- Strunz classification: 4.DB.25
- Crystal system: Orthorhombic
- Crystal class: Dipyramidal (mmm); H-M symbol: (2/m 2/m 2/m)
- Space group: Pbcn
- Unit cell: a = 5.687 Å, b = 4.925 Å c = 5.21 Å; Z = 2

Identification
- Color: Black, may have a brownish tint, brown to yellowish brown due to alteration; light to dark brown in transmitted light
- Crystal habit: Crystals elongated with pyramidal terminations; commonly granular to massive
- Cleavage: {010}, indistinct
- Fracture: Conchoidal fragments
- Tenacity: Brittle
- Mohs scale hardness: 5–6
- Luster: Vitreous – resinous
- Streak: Reddish brown
- Diaphaneity: Opaque, transparent in thin fragments
- Density: 5.6 – 5.8, Average = 5.69
- Optical properties: Appears isotropic
- Refractive index: n = 2.1–2.2
- Alters to: Metamict
- Other characteristics: Radioactive (Greater than 70 Bq / gram)

Samarskite is a radioactive rare earth mineral series which includes samarskite-(Y), with the chemical formula (YFe^{3+}Fe^{2+}U,Th,Ca)_{2}(Nb,Ta)_{2}O_{8} and samarskite-(Yb), with the chemical formula (YbFe^{3+})_{2}(Nb,Ta)_{2}O_{8}. The formula for samarskite-(Y) is also given as (Y,Fe^{3+},U)(Nb,Ta)O_{4}.

Samarskite crystallizes in the orthorhombic – dipyramidal class as black to yellowish brown stubby prisms although it is typically found as anhedral masses. Specimens with a high uranium content are typically metamict and appear coated with a yellow brown earthy rind.

Samarskite occurs in rare earth bearing granite pegmatites with other rare minerals. It occurs in association with columbite, zircon, monazite, uraninite, aeschynite, magnetite, albite, topaz, beryl, garnet, muscovite and biotite.

Samarskite was first described in 1847 for an occurrence in Miass, Ilmen Mountains, Southern Ural Mountains of Russia. The chemical element samarium was first isolated from a specimen of samarskite in 1879. Samarium was named after samarskite which was named for the Russian mine official, Colonel Vasili Samarsky-Bykhovets (1803–1870).

Samarskite-(Yb) was first described in 2004 for an occurrence in the South Platte Pegmatite District, Jefferson County, Colorado.

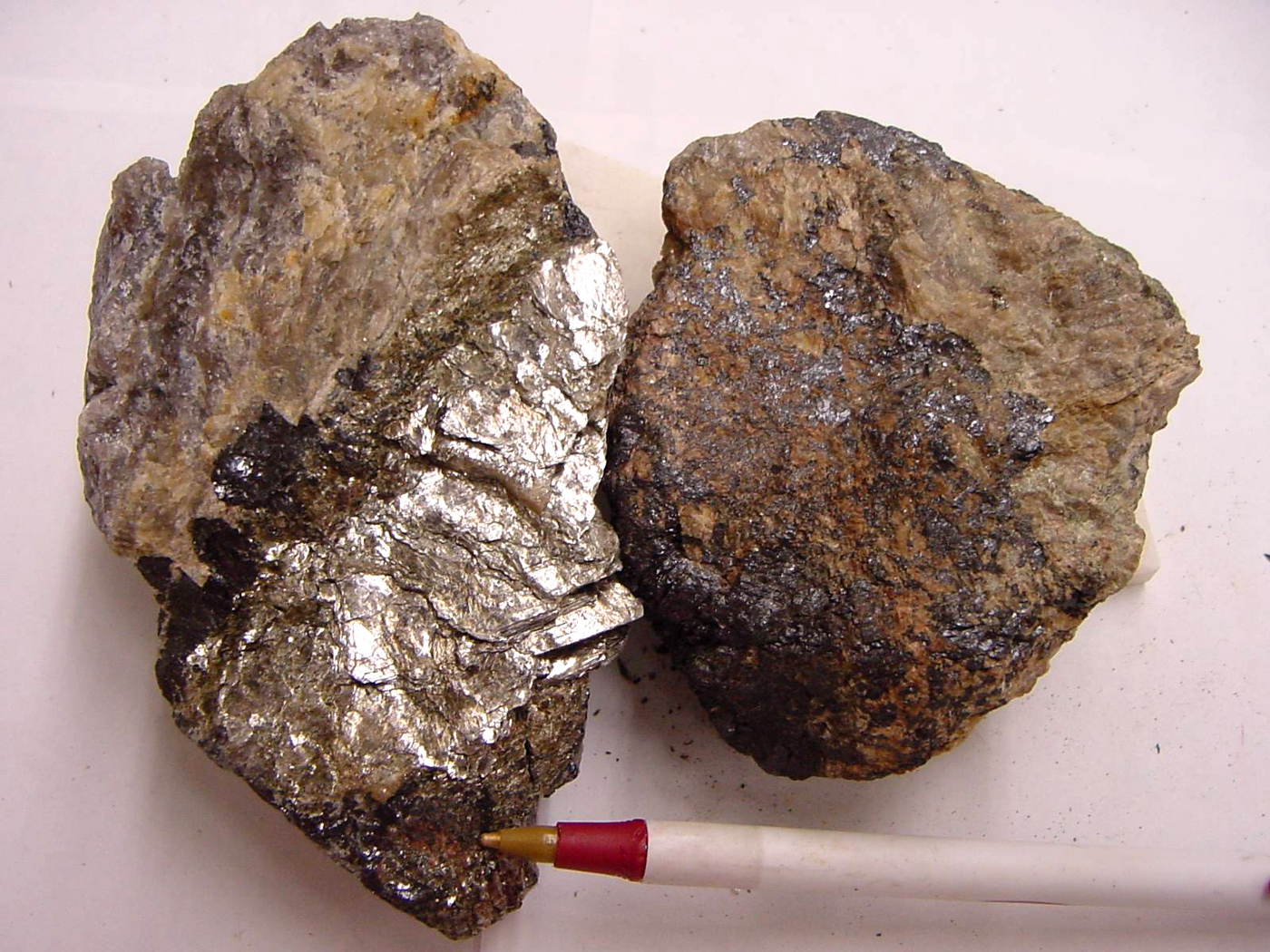
Samarskite specimen, broken to show fresh surface

== See also ==
- Decipium, a mis-identified new element, thought to have been extracted from samarskite in 1878 by Marc Delafontaine.
- List of minerals
- List of minerals named after people
