= Vassili Samarsky-Bykhovets =

Russian mining engineer

Vasili Yevgrafovich Samarsky-Bykhovets
- Born: 7 November 1803; Tomsk Governorate
- Died: 31 May 1870 (aged 66)

Vasili Yevgrafovich Samarsky-Bykhovets (Russian: Василий Евграфович Самарский-Быховец; 7 November 1803 – 31 May 1870) was a Russian mining engineer and the chief of Russian Mining Engineering Corps between 1845 and 1861. The mineral samarskite (samarskite-Y, samarskite-Yb and calciosamarskite), and chemical element samarium are named after him. He was the first person whose name was given to a chemical element.

== Biography ==
Samarsky-Bykhovets was born in a noble family in the Tomsk Governorate, located in the Asian part of Russia east of the Ural Mountains. He received military engineer education at the local Mining Cadet Corps, and after graduation in 1823 served in a military position at the Kolyvan-Resurrection plants and the associated mines in the Urals. In 1828, he was transferred to Saint Petersburg, where he consecutively assumed positions of an assistant in the Cabinet of His Imperial Majesty, chief clerk of the Mining Department, senior aide, and staff officer in the Corps of Mining Engineers. In 1834, he was promoted to the rank of captain and in 1845 to colonel. The next year he was appointed as Chief of Staff of the Corps of Mining Engineers and remained in that position until 1861. While Chief of Staff, he began teaching at Saint Petersburg Mining Institute and eventually became a member of the scientific council there. He was promoted to Lieutenant General in 1860, and in 1861 became chairman of the Board of the Corps of Mining Engineers, and also chairman of the Commission on the Revision of the Mining Charter. He took a three-months sabbatical leave in 1862 to attend an international scientific exhibition in London, and died in 1870.

== Relation to samarskite ==
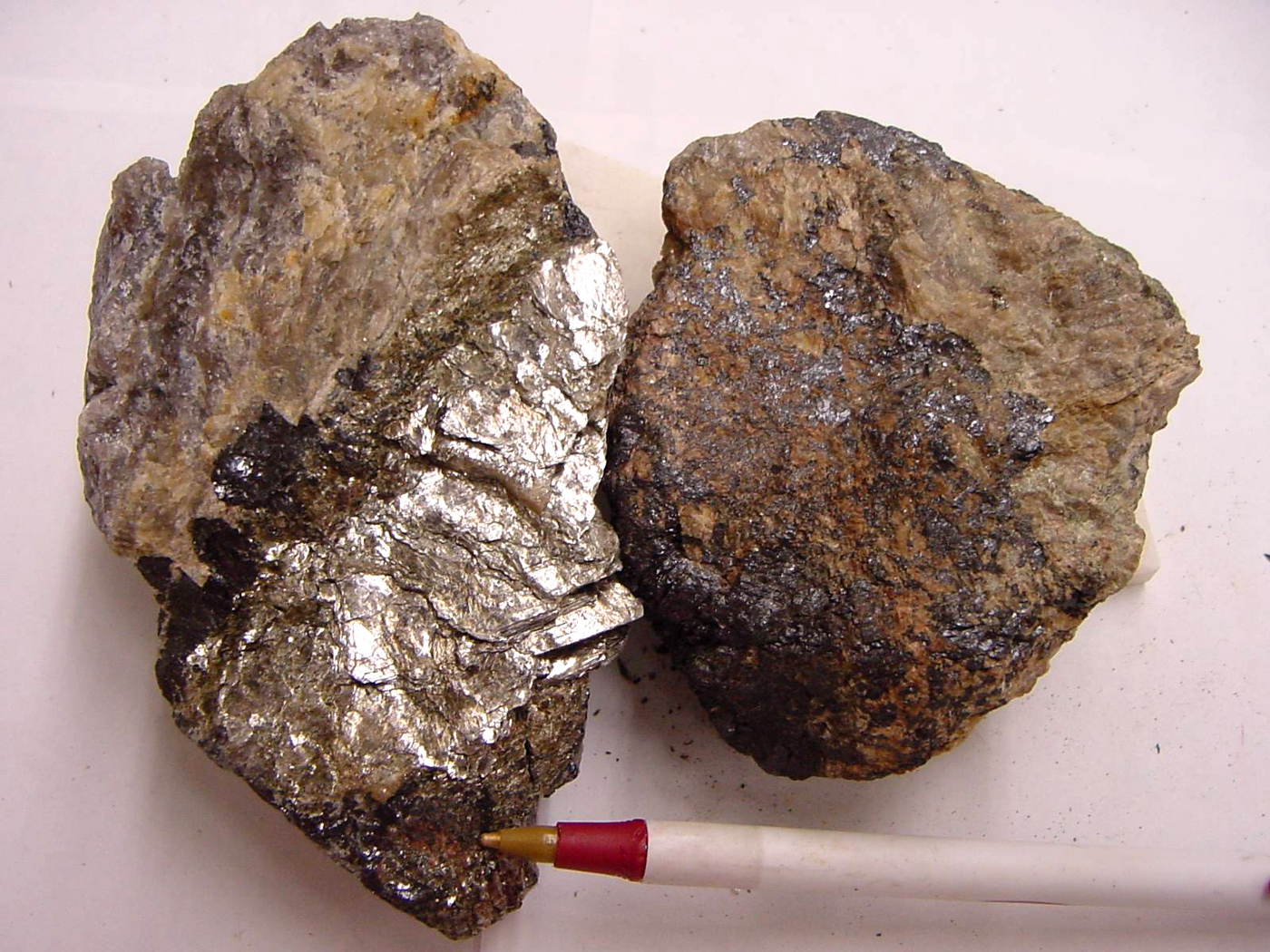
Samarskite specimen, broken to show fresh surface

Samarsky-Bykhovets himself was not involved in the studies of samarskite and samarium. As a mining official, he merely granted access to mineral samples from the Urals to the German mineralogist Gustav Rose and his brother Heinrich Rose. Gustav Rose in 1839 described a new mineral in those samples and named it uranotantalum believing that its composition was dominated by the chemical element tantalum. In 1846–47, his brother and colleague-mineralogist Heinrich Rose found the major component of the mineral to be niobium and suggested altering the name to avoid confusion. The newly chosen name samarskite acknowledged the role of Samarsky-Bykhovets in granting access to the mineral samples. Later, several lanthanide elements were isolated from this mineral, and one of them, samarium, was named after the mineral, once again honoring Samarsky-Bykhovets.
