= Sesquisulfide =

Α sesquisulfide is a compound that has the composition M_{2}S_{3} where M is the element and S is sulfur.

- Boron sesquisulfide, B_{2}S_{3}
- Aluminium sesquisulfide, Al_{2}S_{3}
- Phosphorus sesquisulfide, P_{4}S_{3}
- Scandium sesquisulfide, Sc_{2}S_{3}
- Titanium sesquisulfide, Ti_{2}S_{3}
- Chromium sesquisulfide, Cr_{2}S_{3}
- Gallium sesquisulfide, Ga_{2}S_{3}
- Arsenic sesquisulfide, As_{2}S_{3}
- Yttrium sesquisulfide, Y_{2}S_{3}
- Rhodium sesquisulfide, Rh_{2}S_{3}
- Antimony sesquisulfide, Sb_{2}S_{3}
- Cerium sesquisulfide, Ce_{2}S_{3}
- Praseodymium sesquisulfide, Pr_{2}S_{3}
- Neodymium sesquisulfide, Nd_{2}S_{3}
- Promethium sesquisulfide, Pm_{2}S_{3}
- Samarium sesquisulfide, Sm_{2}S_{3}
- Europium sesquisulfide, Eu_{2}S_{3}
- Gadolinium sesquisulfide, Gd_{2}S_{3}
- Terbium sesquisulfide, Tb_{2}S_{3}
- Dysprosium sesquisulfide, Dy_{2}S_{3}
- Holmium sesquisulfide, Ho_{2}S_{3}
- Erbium sesquisulfide, Er_{2}S_{3}
- Thulium sesquisulfide, Tm_{2}S_{3}
- Ytterbium sesquisulfide, Yb_{2}S_{3}
- Lutetium sesquisulfide, Lu_{2}S_{3}
- Iridium sesquisulfide, Ir_{2}S_{3}
- Gold sesquisulfide, Au_{2}S_{3}
- Bismuth sesquisulfide, Bi_{2}S_{3}
- Actinium sesquisulfide, Ac_{2}S_{3}
