= Corundum (structure) =

Type of crystal structure

Corundum is the name for a structure prototype in inorganic solids, derived from the namesake polymorph of aluminum oxide (α-Al_{2}O_{3}). Other compounds, especially among the inorganic solids, exist in corundum structure, either in ambient or other conditions. Corundum structures are associated with metal-insulator transition, ferroelectricity, polar magnetism, and magnetoelectric effects.

== Structure ==
The corundum structure has the space group R3̅c. It typically exists in binary compounds of the type A_{2}B_{3}, where A is metallic and B is nonmetallic, including sesquioxides (A_{2}O_{3}), sesquisulfides (A_{2}S_{3}), etc. When A is nonmetallic and B is metallic, the structure becomes the antiphase of corundum, called the anticorundum structure type, with examples including β-Ca_{3}N_{2} and borates. Ternary and multinary compounds can also exists in the corundum structure. The corundum-like structure with the composition A_{2}BB'O_{6} is called double corundum. A list of examples are tabulated below.

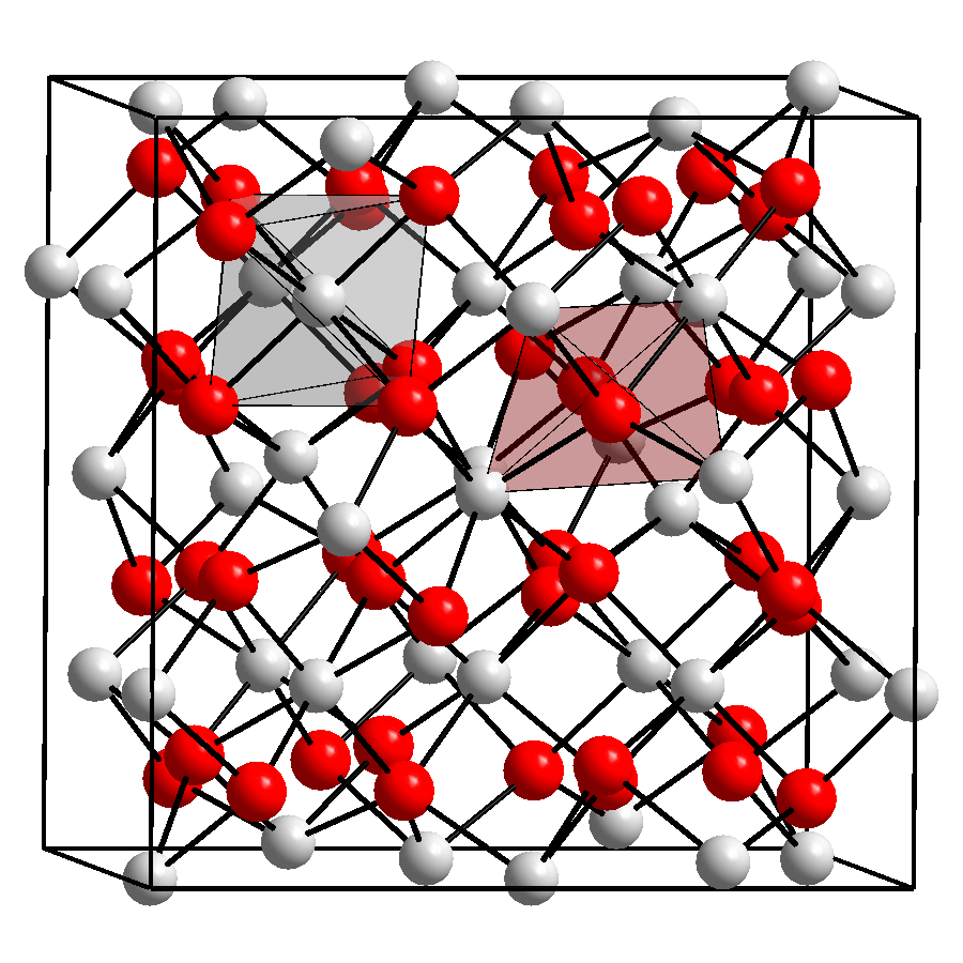
Crystal structure of corrundum. The unit cell contains 16 formulas R2W3 (R=red, W=white). Each red atom is surrounded by six white atoms, and each white by four red.

Materials that exist in the corundum structure
Chemical formula	Alternative name	Material type	Reference
Al_{2}O_{3}	α-Al_{2}O_{3} or corundum	Oxide	
V_{2}O_{3}		Oxide	
Cr_{2}O_{3}	α-Cr_{2}O_{3}	Oxide	
Fe_{2}O_{3}	α-Fe_{2}O_{3} or hematite	Oxide	
Ga_{2}O_{3}	α-Ga_{2}O_{3}	Oxide	
In_{2}O_{3}	rh-In_{2}O_{3}	Oxide	
Ti_{2}O_{3}	α-Ti_{2}O_{3}	Oxide	
Mn_{2}O_{3}	ε-Mn_{2}O_{3}	Oxide	
Rh_{2}O_{3}		Oxide	
Ir_{2}O_{3}	α-Ir_{2}O_{3}	Oxide	
Tl_{2}O_{3}		Oxide	
Ca_{3}N_{2}	β-Ca_{3}N_{2}	Nitride	
In_{2}S_{3}	ε-In_{2}S_{3}	Sulfide	
Tm_{2}S_{3}	E-Tm_{2}S_{3} or ε-Tm_{2}S_{3}	Sulfide	
Yb_{2}S_{3}	E-Yb_{2}S_{3} or ε-Yb_{2}S_{3}	Sulfide	
Lu_{2}S_{3}	E-Lu_{2}S_{3} or ε-Lu_{2}S_{3}	Sulfide	
Cr_{2}(CN_{2})_{3}		Carbodiimide	
Yb_{2}(CN_{2})_{3}		Carbodiimide	
Ca_{3}(BO_{3})_{2}		Borate	
Sr_{3}(BO_{3})_{2}		Borate	
Eu_{3}(BO_{3})_{2}		Borate	
ScFeO_{3}		Ferrite	
GaFeO_{3}		Ferrite	
InFeO_{3}		Ferrite	
CrTiO_{3}		Titanate	
NiCrO_{3}		Chromite	
InVO_{3}		Vanadate	
Ni_{3}TeO_{6}		Double oxide	
Ni_{2}InSbO_{6}		Double oxide	
Ni_{2}ScSbO_{6}		Double oxide	
Mn_{2}FeMoO_{6}		Double oxide	
Mn_{2}FeWO_{6}		Double oxide	
Co_{4}Ta_{2}O_{9}		Triple oxide	

== See also ==
- Corundum
- Ilmenite
- Perovskite (structure)
