= Yttriaite-(Y) =

General
- Category: Oxide minerals
- Formula: Y_{2}O_{3}
- IMA symbol: Yt-Y
- Crystal system: Isometric
- Unit cell: a = 10.6018 Å; Z = 16

Identification
- Color: White
- Cleavage: Distinct – good
- Fracture: Conchoidal
- Mohs scale hardness: 5–6
- Luster: Adamantine
- Streak: White
- Specific gravity: 5.073
- Refractive index: n = 1.931

Yttriaite-(Y) is an exceedingly rare mineral, a natural form of yttrium oxide, Y_{2}O_{3}. In terms of chemistry it is yttrium-analogue of kangite, arsenolite, avicennite and senarmontite (isometric minerals). Other minerals with the general formula A_{2}O_{3} include corundum, bismite, bixbyite, eskolaite, hematite, karelianite, sphaerobismoite, tistarite, and valentinite. Yttriaite-(Y) forms tiny inclusions in native tungsten.
