= Scandium perrhenate =

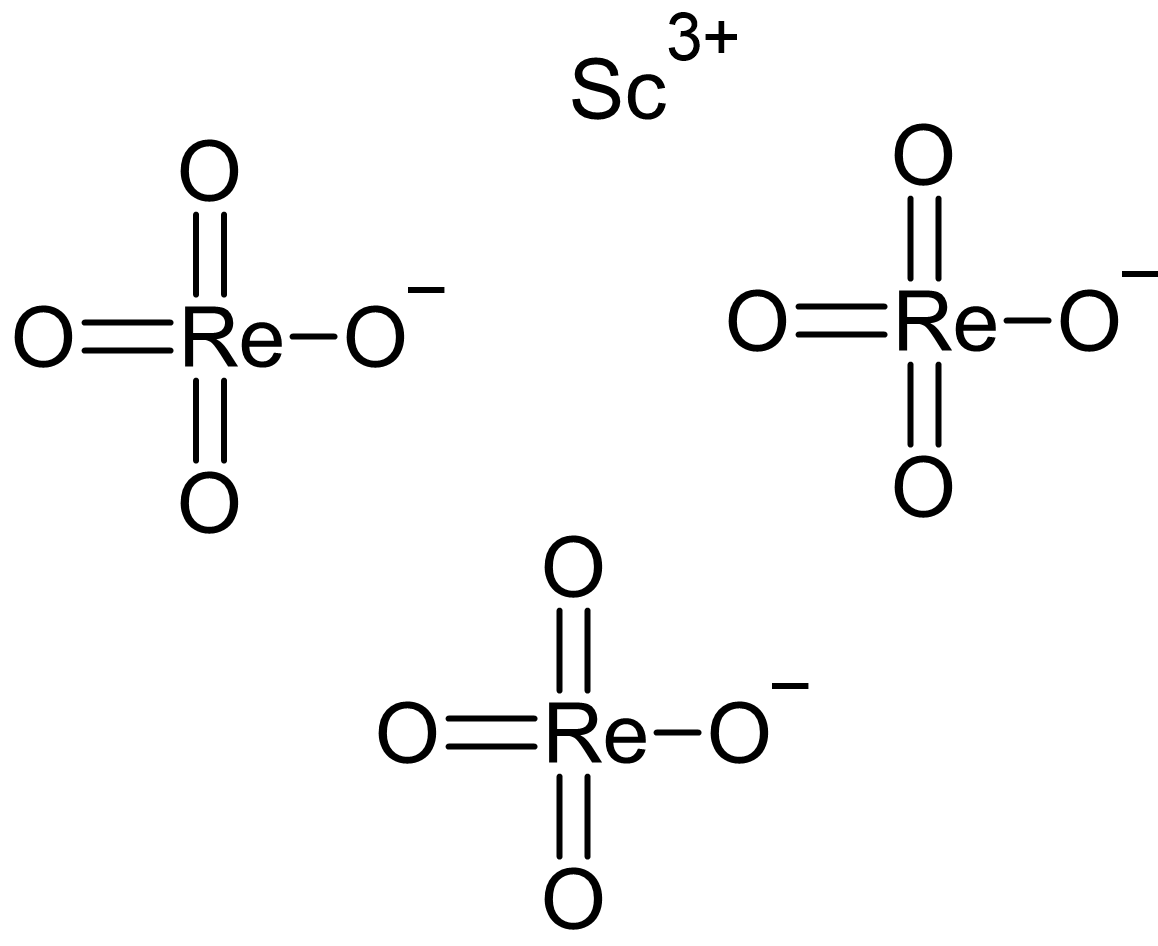

Names
- IUPAC name Scandium perrhenate(VI)
- Other names Scandium(III) perrhenate Scandium(III) perrhenate(VI)

Identifiers
CAS Number	anhydrous: 86498-49-9; trihydrate: 200715-49-7
3D model (JSmol)	anhydrous: Interactive image; trihydrate: Interactive image
- InChI: anhydrous: InChI=1S/12O.3Re.Sc/q;;;;;;;;;3*-1;;;;+3 Key: DQDFVDYBLKBMNM-UHFFFAOYSA-N; trihydrate: InChI=1S/3H2O.12O.3Re.Sc/h3*1H2;;;;;;;;;;;;;;;;/q;;;;;;;;;;;;3*-1;;;;+3 Key: OSEDDTYZDXOQRN-UHFFFAOYSA-N
- SMILES: anhydrous: [Sc+3].O=[Re](=O)(=O)[O-].O=[Re](=O)(=O)[O-].O=[Re](=O)(=O)[O-]; trihydrate: [Sc+3].O=[Re](=O)(=O)[O-].O=[Re](=O)(=O)[O-].O=[Re](=O)(=O)[O-].O.O.O

Properties
Chemical formula	Sc(ReO_{4})_{3}
Molar mass	795.577 (anhydrous); 813.593 (monohydrate); 849.625 (trihydrate)
Melting point	735°C
Solubility in water	very soluble

Related compounds
Other anions	Scandium nitrate Scandium perchlorate
Other cations	Yttrium perrhenate Lanthnaum perrhenate
Related compounds	Rhenium(VII) oxide Perrhenic acid
- Except where otherwise noted, data are given for materials in their standard state (at 25 °C [77 °F], 100 kPa). Infobox references

Scandium perrhenate is an inorganic compound, with the chemical formula Sc(ReO_{4})_{3}. Its thermal stability is lower than that of the corresponding compounds of the yttrium and lanthanum perrhenates.

== Preparation and properties ==
Scandium perrhenate can be obtained by reacting perrhenic acid with scandium oxide. From the solution, the trihydrate of scandium perrhenate can be precipitated, which loses water at 50 °C to obtain Sc(ReO_{4})_{3}·H_{2}O, and obtains the anhydrous form at 140 °C. Scandium oxide and rhenium(VII) oxide are formed at 550 °C.

Scandium perrhenate trihydrate is a crystal in the triclinic crystal system, with space group P1̅, a=7.333, b=7.985, c=20.825 Å; α=93.35, β=92.20, γ=97.42°.

Scandium perrhenate can crystallize with ammonium perrhenate in water to form NH_{4}Sc(ReO_{4})_{4}·4H_{2}O.
