= Lanthanum(III) sulfide =

Names
- IUPAC name lanthanum(3+);trisulfide
- Other names Dilanthanum trisulfide, lanthanum sesquisulfide

Identifiers
CAS Number	12031-49-1
3D model (JSmol)	Interactive image
ChemSpider	145449
ECHA InfoCard	100.031.580
EC Number	235-592-1
PubChem CID	165996
CompTox Dashboard (EPA)	DTXSID40923320
- InChI: InChI=1S/2La.3S/q2*+3;3*-2 Key: YTYSNXOWNOTGMY-UHFFFAOYSA-N
- SMILES: [S-2].[S-2].[S-2].[La+3].[La+3]

Properties
Chemical formula	La_{2}S_{3}
Molar mass	373.99 g·mol^{−1}
Appearance	reddish-yellow crystals
Density	4.9 g/cm^{3}
Melting point	2,100 °C (3,810 °F; 2,370 K)
Solubility in water	reacts with hot water

Hazards
- GHS labelling
Pictograms	(GHS07: Exclamation mark) (GHS02: Flammable)

Structure
Crystal structure	cubic

Related compounds
Other cations	Cerium(III) sulfide, Promethium(III) sulfide
- Except where otherwise noted, data are given for materials in their standard state (at 25 °C [77 °F], 100 kPa). Infobox references

Lanthanum(III) sulfide is a binary inorganic chemical compound of lanthanum metal and sulfur with the chemical formula La_{2}S_{3}. At least three polymorphs are known, referred to as α, β, and γ.

== Synthesis ==
Lanthanum(III) sulfide can directly be produced by treating metallic lanthanum with sulfur:

2La + 3S → La_{2}S_{3}

Once prepared, lanthanum(III) sulfide can be purified by chemical vapor transport using iodine.

Lanthanum(III) sulfide can also be prepared by treating the sulfate with hydrogen sulfide at elevated temperatures:

La_{2}(SO_{4})_{3} + 12 H_{2}S → La_{2}S_{3} + 12 H_{2}O + 12 S

== Physical properties ==
Dilanthanum trisulfide forms reddish-yellow crystals of the cubic system, with space group I43d, and unit cell parameters a = 0.8706 nm. The α polymorph features two types of La3+ centers, one with Capped trigonal prismatic molecular geometry and one is bicapped trigonal prismatic molecular geometry.

It does not dissolve in cold water.

== Chemical properties ==
- Reacts with hot water:

La_{2}S_{3} + 6 H_{2}O → 2 La(OH)_{3} + 3 HS

- Reacts with acids:

La_{2}S_{3} + 3 HCl → 2 LaCl_{3} + 3 H_{2}S

- Oxidized by oxygen in atmosphere:

2 La_{2}S_{3} + 9 O_{2} → 2 La_{2}O_{3} + 6 SO_{2}

== Uses ==
La_{2}S_{3} is used as a precursor to prepare complex compounds. It is also used in glass manufacturing and in optical fibers.
