= Titanium sulfide =

The titanium sulfides are a class of chemical compounds comprising titanium and sulfur in varying stoichiometries. They include:

- Titanium(II) sulfide, a rare mineral
- Titanium(III) sulfide, a refractory
- Titanium(IV) sulfide, used in batteries or other electrochemical cells
- Titanium "trisulfide", technically a mixed-valence sulfide and disulfide salt
