= Scandium sulfide =

Scandium sulfide can refer to two different sulfides of scandium:

- Scandium monosulfide, ScS
- Scandium(III) sulfide, Sc_{2}S_{3}

Detailed information on each of these compounds is found on the specific pages linked above.
