= William Fairburn =

William Fairburn may refer to:

- William Armstrong Fairburn (1876–1947), American author, naval architect, marine engineer, industrial executive, and chemist
- William Thomas Fairburn (1795–1859), New Zealand carpenter and missionary
