= Praseodymium telluride =

Praseodymium telluride may refer to:

- Praseodymium monotelluride, PrTe
- Praseodymium sesquitelluride, Pr_{2}Te_{3}
- Praseodymium ditelluride, PrTe_{2}
