= Neodymium tungstate =

Names
- Other names Neodymium(III) wolframate Neodymi(III) tungstate Neodymium wolframate

Identifiers
CAS Number	14014-27-8
3D model (JSmol)	Interactive image
ECHA InfoCard	100.034.376
EC Number	237-828-9
PubChem CID	44148797
- InChI: InChI=1S/2Nd.12O.3W/q2*+3;12*-2;;; Key: GXEGJIVZLXITCF-UHFFFAOYSA-N
- SMILES: [O-2].[O-2].[O-2].[O-2].[O-2].[O-2].[O-2].[O-2].[O-2].[O-2].[O-2].[O-2].[Nd+3].[Nd+3].[W].[W].[W]

Properties
Chemical formula	Nd_{2}(WO_{4})_{3}
Molar mass	1031,9968 g/mol (anhydrous); 1194,13432 g/mol (nonahydrate)
Appearance	light purple crystals
Density	7,02 g/cm^{3}
Melting point	1,135 °C (2,075 °F; 1,408 K)
Solubility in water	21 mg/100 mL (20 °C); 27 mg/100 mL (100 °C)

Related compounds
Other anions	Neodymium chromate Neodymium molybdate
Other cations	Praseodymium tungstate Promethium tungstate Samarium tungstate
- Except where otherwise noted, data are given for materials in their standard state (at 25 °C [77 °F], 100 kPa). Infobox references

Neodymium tungstate is an inorganic compound, a salt of neodymium and tungstic acid with the chemical formula Nd_{2}(WO_{4})_{3}. It forms hydrated light purple crystals that are slightly soluble in water.

== Properties ==
Neodymium tungstate forms the crystal of a monoclinic crystal system, with space group A 2/a, lattice constants a = 1.151 nm, b = 1.159 nm, c = 0.775 nm and β = 109.67 °. It is insoluble in ethanol and acetone and sparingly soluble in water. It forms the nonahydrate Nd_{2}(WO_{4})_{3}·9H_{2}O.
