= Scandium dodecaboride =

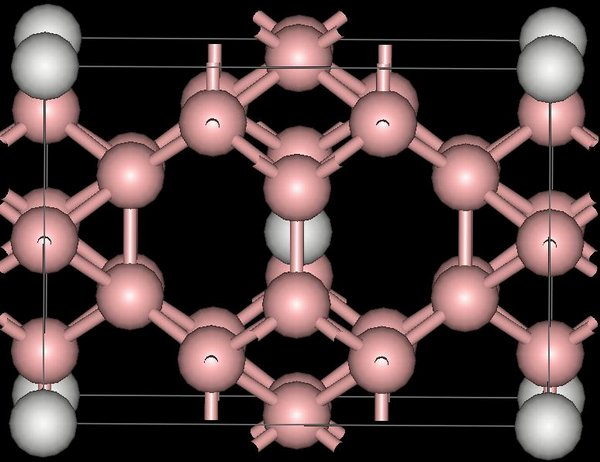

Names
- IUPAC name scandium dodecaboride

Identifiers
CAS Number	12230-35-2
3D model (JSmol)	Interactive image
- InChI: InChI=1S/12B.Sc
- SMILES: [B].[B].[B].[B].[B].[B].[B].[B].[B].[B].[B].[B].[Sc]

Properties
Chemical formula	ScB_{12}
Molar mass	174.69 g/mol

Structure
Crystal structure	Tetragonal, tI26
Space group	I4/mmm, No. 139
- Except where otherwise noted, data are given for materials in their standard state (at 25 °C [77 °F], 100 kPa). verify (what is ?) Infobox references

Scandium dodecaboride is a refractory metal boride.

== Synthesis ==
ScB_{12} is formed by mixing a 7:1 ratio of boron powder and scandium oxide powder, heating to 2500 °C with a plasma torch or similar, quenching in cold water and washing with concentrated hydrochloric acid.

== Crystallography ==
ScB_{12} was originally reported as having a cubic structure, later studies showed it to have tetragonal structure (unit cell with a=522pm, c=735pm). More recently it has been shown that there is indeed a cubic form but that it requires stabilization.
