= Promethium(III) sulfide =

Names
- Other names Dipromethium trisulfide

Identifiers
CAS Number	12337-21-2
3D model (JSmol)	Interactive image
- InChI: InChI=1S/2Pm.3S/q2*+3;3*-2 Key: DWKHKOHUCVHMOJ-UHFFFAOYSA-N
- SMILES: [Pm+3].[Pm+3].[S-2].[S-2].[S-2]

Properties
Chemical formula	Pm_{2}S_{3}
Molar mass	386 g·mol^{−1}
Appearance	garnet red crystals
Density	g/cm^{3}

Structure
Crystal structure	orthorhombic

Related compounds
Related compounds	Lanthanum(III) sulfide

Hazards
- Occupational safety and health (OHS/OSH)
Main hazards	radioactive
- Except where otherwise noted, data are given for materials in their standard state (at 25 °C [77 °F], 100 kPa). Infobox references

Promethium(III) sulfide is a binary inorganic compound with the chemical formula Pm_{2}S_{3}.

== Synthesis ==
Promethium(III) sulfide can be produced by treating metallic promethium with sulfur:

2Pm + 3S → Pm_{2}S_{3}

Once prepared, promethium(III) sulfide can be purified by chemical vapor transport using iodine.

Promethium(III) sulfide can also be prepared by treating the sulfate with hydrogen sulfide at elevated temperatures:

Pm_{2}(SO_{4})_{3} + 12 H_{2}S → Pm_{2}S_{3} + 12 H_{2}O + 12 S

== Physical properties ==
The compound forms garnet red crystals of the orthorhombic system, space group I4̅3d and exists in α and β forms.
