= Indium(III) oxalate =

Names
- Other names Indium oxalate

Identifiers
CAS Number	5066-15-9
3D model (JSmol)	Interactive image; decahydrate: Interactive image
ChemSpider	decahydrate: 29337514
PubChem CID	22492836
- InChI: InChI=1S/3C2H2O4.2In/c3*3-1(4)2(5)6;;/h3*(H,3,4)(H,5,6);;/q;;;2*+3/p-6 Key: LKEDUJPRSZGTHZ-UHFFFAOYSA-H; decahydrate: InChI=1S/3C2H2O4.2In.10H2O/c3*3-1(4)2(5)6;;;;;;;;;;;;/h3*(H,3,4)(H,5,6);;;10*1H2/q;;;2*+3;;;;;;;;;;/p-6 Key: KULOXGQOECPORB-UHFFFAOYSA-H
- SMILES: C(=O)(C(=O)[O-])[O-].C(=O)(C(=O)[O-])[O-].C(=O)(C(=O)[O-])[O-].[In+3].[In+3]; decahydrate: O.O.O.O.O.O.O.O.O.O.O=C([O-])C(=O)[O-].O=C([O-])C(=O)[O-].O=C([O-])C(=O)[O-].[In+3].[In+3]

Properties
Chemical formula	In_{2}(C_{2}O_{4})_{3}
Molar mass	493.69 g/mol
Appearance	White crystalline solid (hydrates)
- Except where otherwise noted, data are given for materials in their standard state (at 25 °C [77 °F], 100 kPa). Infobox references

Indium(III) oxalate is an inorganic compound of indium and the oxalate ion, with the formula In_{2}(C_{2}O_{4})_{3}. It forms several hydrated phases and on heating ultimately decomposes to indium(III) oxide.

== Preparation ==
Hydrated indium(III) oxalate can be prepared by precipitation from an aqueous solution containing indium(III) ions and oxalic acid. Older work on the indium chloride–oxalic acid–water system reported hydrated indium oxalate phases formed from aqueous solution.

The precipitation can be represented schematically as:

2 In^{3+} + 3 C_{2}O_{4}^{2−} → In_{2}(C_{2}O_{4})_{3}

Oxalic-acid precipitation has also been investigated as a method for recovering indium from industrial and electronic-waste solutions.

== Properties ==
=== Hydrates and structure ===
Several hydrated indium(III) oxalates are known. A hexahydrate with composition [In_{2}(C_{2}O_{4})_{3}(H_{2}O)_{4}]·2H_{2}O has been structurally characterized.

A decahydrate, conventionally written In_{2}(C_{2}O_{4})_{3}·10H_{2}O, has also been studied in detail. Structural analysis showed that its more informative formulation is [In_{2}(C_{2}O_{4})_{3}(H_{2}O)_{3}]·7H_{2}O.

This decahydrate crystallizes in the monoclinic crystal system, space group P2_{1}/c, with lattice parameters a = 8.7456 Å, b = 11.1479 Å, c = 21.9376 Å and β = 112.1°, with four formula units per unit cell.

Its structure consists of corrugated neutral layers built from indium coordination polyhedra and bridging oxalate ligands. Two crystallographically distinct indium sites occur, with seven- and eight-coordinate oxygen environments. Seven additional water molecules occupy the spaces between the layers and participate in hydrogen bonding.

=== Thermal behaviour ===
The decahydrate loses water stepwise on heating. Temperature-dependent X-ray diffraction and thermogravimetric measurements show a multistage dehydration sequence, including formation of a hexahydrate phase, followed by decomposition of the oxalate framework.

Further heating yields nanocrystalline indium(III) oxide, In_{2}O_{3}. The crystallite size of the oxide increases on annealing between about 500 and 750 °C.

A later study also used indium oxalate hexahydrate as a precursor in the preparation of indium-containing oxide materials from recycled liquid-crystal-display waste.

=== Complex oxalates ===
Indium(III) forms several soluble oxalato complexes. Depending on oxalate concentration and solution conditions, species such as [In(C_{2}O_{4})]^{+}, [In(C_{2}O_{4})_{2}]^{−} and [In(C_{2}O_{4})_{3}]^{3−} can occur.

Alkali-metal salts containing bis(oxalato)indate(III) anions have been structurally characterized.
