= Scandium(III) phosphate =

Chemical compound

Identifiers
CAS Number	15123-98-5
3D model (JSmol)	Interactive image
ChemSpider	13658173
EC Number	239-188-6
PubChem CID	13643864
- InChI: InChI=1S/H3O4P.Sc/c1-5(2,3)4;/h(H3,1,2,3,4);/q;+3/p-3 Key: DYRWWVFQQONJJK-UHFFFAOYSA-K
- SMILES: [O-]P(=O)([O-])[O-].[Sc+3]

Properties
Chemical formula	ScPO_{4}
Molar mass	139.926 g·mol^{−1}
- Except where otherwise noted, data are given for materials in their standard state (at 25 °C [77 °F], 100 kPa). Infobox references

Scandium(III) phosphate is an inorganic compound of scandium, with the molecular formula ScPO_{4}.

It also occurs naturally as the rare mineral pretulite.

== Preparation ==
It can be prepared by heating scandium oxide and dilute phosphoric acid for at least a week at 400°C, yielding anhydrous scandium phosphate. Lower temperatures produce hydrates and mixtures of hydrates.

== Properties ==
Anhydrous scandium phosphate crystalizes in the zircon structure.
