= Iridium sulfide =

Iridium sulfide may refer to:

- Iridium(III) sulfide, Ir_{2}S_{3}
- Iridium disulfide, IrS_{2}
