= Neodymium molybdate =

Identifiers
| CAS Number | 13477-90-2 |
| 3D model (JSmol) | Interactive image |
- InChI: InChI=1S/3Mo.2Nd.12O/q;;;2*+3;;;;;;;6*-1 Key: YKCRURZFHCSIBB-UHFFFAOYSA-N
- SMILES: [Nd+3].[Nd+3].[O-][Mo](=O)(=O)[O-].[O-][Mo](=O)(=O)[O-].[O-][Mo](=O)(=O)[O-]

Properties
| Chemical formula | Nd_{2}(MoO_{4})_{3} |
| Appearance | blue solid |
| Solubility in water | insoluble |
- Except where otherwise noted, data are given for materials in their standard state (at 25 °C [77 °F], 100 kPa). Infobox references

Neodymium molybdate is an inorganic compound, with the chemical formula of Nd_{2}(MoO_{4})_{3}.

== Preparation ==
It can be prepared by reacting neodymium oxide and molybdenum trioxide at a high temperature:

Nd_{2}O_{3} + 3MoO_{3} → Nd_{2}(MoO_{4})_{3}

It can also be prepared by reacting neodymium nitrate and (NH_{4})_{6}Mo_{7}O_{24}, treating the obtained precipitate at a high temperature.

== Properties ==
It reacts with sodium molybdate at a high temperature to obtain NaNd(MoO_{4})_{2}. It reacts at roughly 350°C to 700°C with hydrogen sulfide to obtain neodymium sulfide and molybdenum disulfide. At roughly 780K to 870K, it can be reduced by hydrogen to obtain Nd_{2}Mo_{3}O_{9}.
