= William Armstrong Fairburn =

American marine engineer (1876–1947)

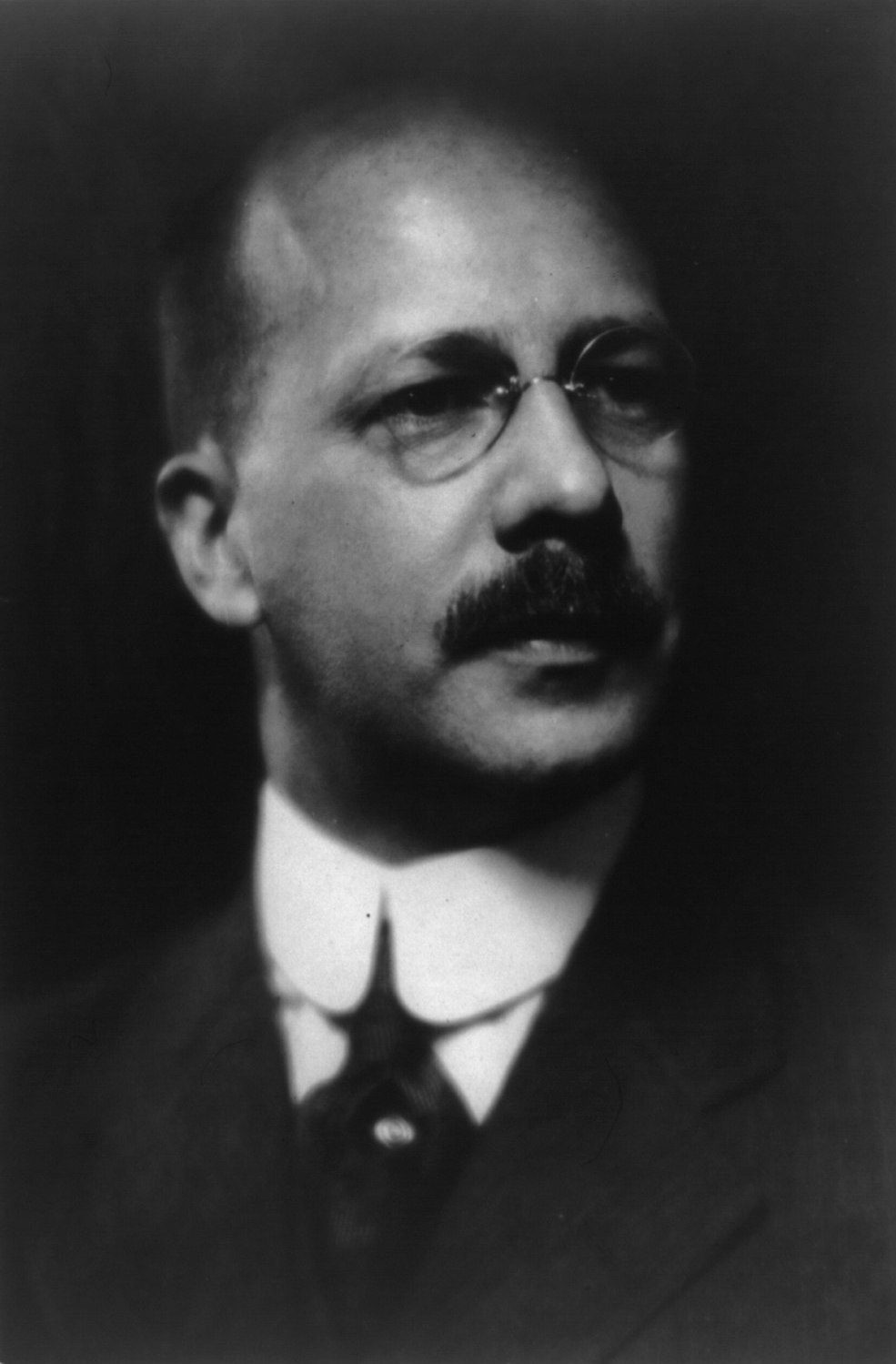
William A. Fairburn.

William Armstrong Fairburn (October 12, 1876 – October 1, 1947) was an American writer, naval architect, marine engineer, industrial executive, and chemist.

== Biography ==
He was the son of Thomas W. Fairburn and Elizabeth Jemima Frosdick, who married in Leeds, Yorkshire, England, in 1867.

Census information shows that Thomas worked as a ship fitter, then foreman at a ship yard in Braintree, Massachusetts. He made trips home to visit family still in Huddersfield, and his passport application (1923) shows that he was born in Hull, England in 1849, and that his father was another Thomas.

William was born in Huddersfield, England on October 12, 1876, the 1891 census showing that he had already begun work as a 'Post Office boy' by the age of 14. He emigrated in May 1891 from Liverpool to New York on the S.S. Servia with his mother Elizabeth, and sisters Alice and Annie, following his father who had emigrated the year before. He attended the public schools in Bath, Maine, became an apprentice, and by age 18 was a master mechanic. In 1896, he went to the University of Glasgow and studied naval architecture and marine engineering for a year.

He returned to the United States to work at Bath Iron Works where he built an all-steel freighter, the first in America. By 1900 he was an independent consultant. In this capacity, he met O. C. Barber and Edward R. Stettinius, Sr., at the Stirling Boiler Co. (later merged into Babcock & Wilcox). They were also executives at the Diamond Match Company, and in 1909 they put Fairburn in charge of its operations in hopes of solving some problems it had encountered. In the 1910 census (Groton, Connecticut), Fairburn is shown as a naval architect.

A major problem at Diamond Match was the white phosphorus used in making matches which caused health problems for workers and poisoned children who ate the matches. Fairburn discovered company patents which provided an alternative, and, working with company chemists, by 1911 an improved match, which substituted sesquisulfide for the phosphorus, was introduced.

At Diamond Match, Fairburn also discovered and worked out a chemical process for extracting potash from kelp. Owing to this discovery, the price of matches did not increase when the start of World War I shut off the old sources of potash supply. Fairburn later became president of the Diamond Match Company in 1915, succeeding Stettenius. In the 1930 census (Morris, New Jersey), he is shown as an executive in a match factory.

The Fairburn Marine Education Foundation, Inc., of Center Lovell, Maine, was established in his honor.

== Writings ==
Fairburn published several dozen books in the early twentieth century concerned generally with sociology in the workplace, theories and speculations on human potentialities, and other topics. Among his works are:

- Human Chemistry (1914) This work describes workers as chemical elements in a well-stocked laboratory and handlers of people as chemists.
- The Individual and Society (1915)
- Man and his health; Liquids (1916)
- Life and Work (1916)
- Mentality and Freedom (1917)
- The Diagnosis of the German Obsession (1918)
- Organization and Success (1923)
- Justice and Law (1927)
- Russia, the Utopia in chains (1931)
- Work and workers: Essays and miscellaneous writings (1933)
- Merchant Sail, (1945–1955)

== Family ==
He married Isabella Louise Ramsay (born August 4, 1878, Summerfield, Prince Edward Island, Canada) in September 1904.
