= Karelianite =

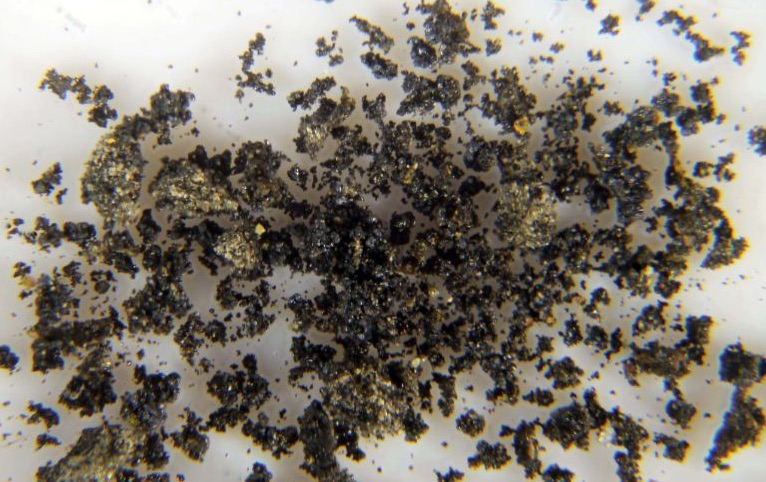

General
- Category: Minerals
- Formula: V_{2}O_{3}

Identification
- Color: Black
- Luster: Metallic
- Specific gravity: 4.95

Karelianite is an rare mineral, a natural form of vanadium(III) oxide, V_{2}O_{3}. In terms of chemistry it is vanadium-analogue of hematite, corundum, eskolaite, tistarite, bixbyite, avicennite, and yttriaite-(Y). The name comes from Karelia, a region on the Finnish-Russian border. It may be associated with magnesium-rich rocks.
