= Samarium(III) sulfide =

Names
- Other names disamarium trisulphide; Samarium sesquisulfide

Identifiers
CAS Number	12067-22-0
3D model (JSmol)	Interactive image
ChemSpider	145783
ECHA InfoCard	100.031.875
EC Number	235-076-6
PubChem CID	166593
CompTox Dashboard (EPA)	DTXSID90923512
- InChI: InChI=1S/3S.2Sm/q3*-2;2*+3
- SMILES: [S-2].[S-2].[S-2].[Sm+3].[Sm+3]

Properties
Chemical formula	Sm_{2}S_{3}
Molar mass	396.915 g/mol
Appearance	red-brown crystals
Density	5.87 g/cm^{3}, solid
Melting point	1,720 °C (3,130 °F; 1,990 K)
Band gap	1.71 eV
Magnetic susceptibility (χ)	+3300.0·10^{−6} cm^{3}/mol

Structure
Crystal structure	orthorhombic
- Except where otherwise noted, data are given for materials in their standard state (at 25 °C [77 °F], 100 kPa). verify (what is ?) Infobox references

Samarium(III) sulfide (Sm_{2}S_{3}) is a chemical compound of the rare earth element samarium, and sulfur. In this compound samarium is in the +3 oxidation state, and sulfur is an anion in the −2 state.

== Synthesis ==
Samarium(III) sulfide can be produced by treating metallic samarium with sulfur:

2Sm + 3S → Sm_{2}S_{3}

Once prepared, samarium(III) sulfide can be purified by chemical vapor transport using iodine.

Samarium(III) sulfide can also be prepared by treating the sulfate with hydrogen sulfide at elevated temperatures:

Sm_{2}(SO_{4})_{3} + 12 H_{2}S → Sm_{2}S_{3} + 12 H_{2}O + 12 S

== Properties ==
The low temperature α form crystallises in the orthorhombic crystal system. The unit cell has dimensions a=7.376, b=3.9622 c=15.352 Å with volume 448.7 Å_{3}. There are four of the formula in each unit cell (Sm_{8}S_{12}). The density comes out to 5.88 kg/liter. There are two kinds of samarium coordination in the solid, one is eight coordinated with sulfur surrounding in a bicapped trigonal pyramid. The other is a sevenfold capped distorted octahedral arrangement. This structure is similar to other light rare-earth element sulfides.

Samarium(III) sulfide is a semiconductor with a band gap of 1.7 eV. As a thin film on high area electrodes, it is under investigation as a super capacitor dielectric, with specific capacitances of up to 360 Farads per gram.

== Related ==
Related samarium sulfides include the monosulfide SmS and the mixed valent Sm_{3}S_{4} which are also semiconductors. KSm_{2}CuS_{6} is a layered quaternary sulfide.
