= Cerium(III) sulfide =

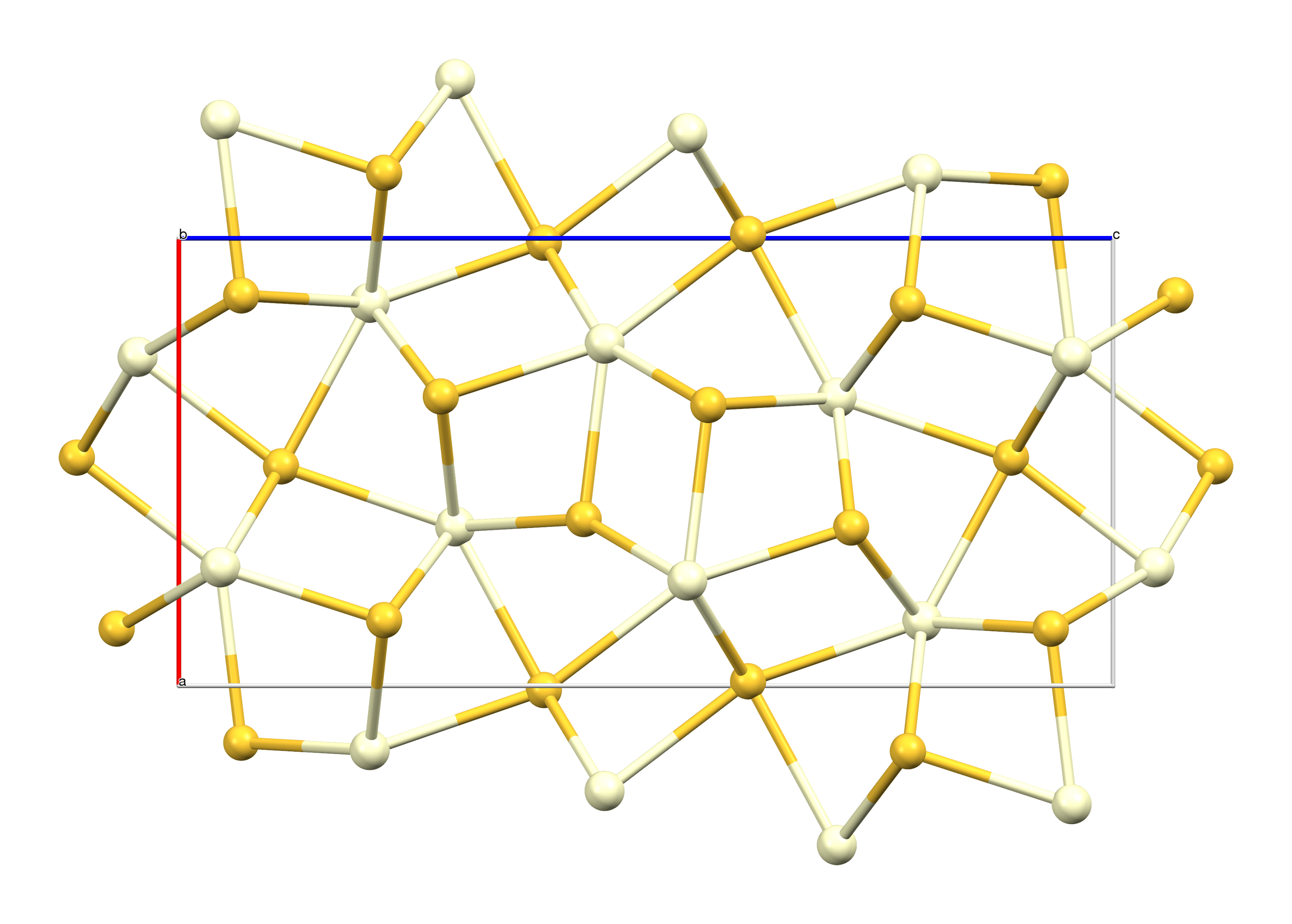

Names
- IUPAC name Cerium(III) sulfide
- Other names: Cerium sulfide red; Cerium sesquisulfide; Cerous sulfide; Dicerium trisulfide

Identifiers
CAS Number	12014-93-6
3D model (JSmol)	Interactive image
ChemSpider	140174
ECHA InfoCard	100.031.445
EC Number	234-603-7
PubChem CID	159394
CompTox Dashboard (EPA)	DTXSID30894257
- InChI: InChI=1S/2Ce.3S/q2*+3;3*-2 Key: MMXSKTNPRXHINM-UHFFFAOYSA-N
- SMILES: [S-2].[S-2].[S-2].[Ce+3].[Ce+3]

Properties
Chemical formula	Ce_{2}S_{3}
Molar mass	375.73 g/mol
Appearance	Red/burgundy/black crystals (depending on polymorph)
Density	5.18 g/cm^{3}
Melting point	1,840 to 1,940 °C (3,340 to 3,520 °F; 2,110 to 2,210 K)
Boiling point	decomposes (at 2300 °C)
Solubility in water	insoluble
Solubility	soluble in warm formic or acetic acid soluble in cold dil. HCl, HNO_{3} or H_{2}SO_{4}
Band gap	2.06 eV (γ-Ce_{2}S_{3})
Refractive index (n_{D})	2.77 (589 nm)

Structure
Crystal structure	orthorhombic (α-Ce_{2}S_{3}) tetragonal (β-Ce_{2}S_{3}) cubic (γ-Ce_{2}S_{3})

Thermochemistry
Heat capacity (C)	126.2 J·mol^{−1}·K^{−1}
Std enthalpy of formation (Δ_{f}H^{⦵}_{298})	−1260 kJ·mol^{−1}
Gibbs free energy (Δ_{f}G^{⦵})	−1230 kJ·mol^{−1}

Hazards
- GHS labelling
Pictograms	(GHS07: Exclamation mark)
Signal word	Warning
Hazard statements	H315, H319, H335
Precautionary statements	P261, P280, P305+P351+P338

Related compounds
Other anions	Cerium(III) oxide Cerium(III) selenide Cerium(III) oxyselenide
Other cations	Samarium(III) sulfide Praseodymium(III) sulfide
Related compounds	Cerium monosulfide Cerium disulfide Cerium(III) oxysulfide
- Except where otherwise noted, data are given for materials in their standard state (at 25 °C [77 °F], 100 kPa). Infobox references

Cerium(III) sulfide, also known as cerium sesquisulfide, is an inorganic compound with the formula Ce_{2}S_{3}. It is the sulfide salt of cerium(III) and exists as three polymorphs with different crystal structures.

Its high melting point (comparable to silica or alumina) and chemically inert nature have led to occasional examination of potential use as a refractory material for crucibles, but it has never been widely adopted for this application.

The distinctive red colour of two of the polymorphs (α- and β-Ce_{2}S_{3}) and aforementioned chemical stability up to high temperatures have led to some limited commercial use as a red pigment (known as cerium sulfide red).

== Synthesis ==
The oldest syntheses reported for cerium(III) sulfide follow a typical rare earth sesquisulfide formation route, which involves heating the corresponding cerium sesquioxide to 900–1100 °C in an atmosphere of hydrogen sulfide:

Ce_{2}O_{3} + 3 H_{2}S → Ce_{2}S_{3} + 3 H_{2}O

Newer synthetic procedures utilise less toxic carbon disulfide gas for sulfurisation, starting from cerium dioxide which is reduced by the CS_{2} gas at temperatures of 800–1000 °C:

6 CeO_{2} + 5 CS_{2} → 3 Ce_{2}S_{3} + 5 CO_{2} + SO_{2}

== Polymorphs ==
Polymorphs of cerium(III) sulfide
Polymorph	T of formation	Colour	Crystal system	Space group	Lattice constants
α-Ce_{2}S_{3}	<900 °C	black	Orthorhombic	Pnma (No. 62)	a=7.63 Å, b=4.12 Å, c=15.71 Å
β-Ce_{2}S_{3}	900–1200 °C	burgundy	Tetragonal	I4_{1}/acd (No. 142)	a=15.37 Å, c=20.35 Å
γ-Ce_{2}S_{3}	>1200 °C	red	Cubic	I4̅3d (No. 220)	a=8.63 Å

Ce_{2}S_{3} exists in three polymorphic forms: α-Ce_{2}S_{3} (orthorhombic, black colour), β-Ce_{2}S_{3} (tetragonal, burgundy colour), γ-Ce_{2}S_{3} (cubic, red colour). They are analogous to the crystal structures of the likewise trimorphic Pr_{2}S_{3} and Nd_{2}S_{3}.

Following the synthetic procedures given above will yield mostly the α- and β- polymorphs, with the proportion of α-Ce_{2}S_{3} increasing at lower temperatures (~700–900 °C) and with longer reaction times. The α- form can be irreversibly transformed into β-Ce_{2}S_{3} by vacuum heating at 1200 °C for 7 hours. Then γ-Ce_{2}S_{3} is obtained from sintering of β-Ce_{2}S_{3} powder via hot pressing at an even higher temperature (1700 °C).

=== α polymorph ===
The α polymorph of cerium(III) sulfide has the same structure as α-Gd_{2}S_{3}. It contains both 7-coordinate and 8-coordinate cerium ions, Ce^{3+}, with monocapped and bicapped trigonal prismatic coordination geometry, respectively. The sulfide ions, S^{2−}, are 5-coordinate. Two thirds of them adopt a square pyramidal geometry and one third adopt a trigonal bipyramidal geometry.

Coordination in α-Ce_{2}S_{3}
Cerium Ce1 coordination	Cerium Ce2 coordination	Sulfur S1 coordination	Sulfur S2 coordination	Sulfur S3 coordination

=== γ polymorph ===
The γ polymorph of cerium(III) sulfide adopts a cation-deficient form of the Th_{3}P_{4} structure. 8 out the 9 metal positions in the Th_{3}P_{4} structure are occupied by cerium in γ-Ce_{2}S_{3}, with the remainder as vacancies. This composition can be represented by the formula Ce_{2.667}S_{4}. The cerium ions are 8-coordinate while the sulfide ions are 6-coordinate (distorted octahedral).

== Reactions ==
Some reported reactions of cerium(III) sulfide are with bismuth compounds in order to form superconducting crystalline materials of the M(O,F)BiS_{2} family (for M=Ce).

The reaction of Ce_{2}S_{3} with Bi_{2}S_{3} and Bi_{2}O_{3} in a sealed tube at 950 °C gives the parent compound CeOBiS_{2}:

3 Ce_{2}S_{3} + Bi_{2}S_{3} + 2 Bi_{2}O_{3} → 6 CeOBiS_{2}

This material is superconducting on its own, but the properties can be enhanced if it is doped with fluoride by including BiF_{3} in the reaction mixture.

== Applications ==
=== Refractory material ===
Cerium(III) and cerium(IV) sulfides were first investigated in the 1940s as part of the Manhattan project, where they were considered- but eventually not adopted- as advanced refractory materials. Their suggested application was as the material in crucibles for the casting of uranium and plutonium metal.

Although the sulfide's properties (high melting point and large, large negative Δ_{f}G° and chemical inertness) are suitable and cerium is a relatively common element (66 ppm, about as much as copper), the danger of the traditional H_{2}S-involving production route and the difficulty in controlling the formation of the resulting Ce_{2}S_{3}/CeS solid mixture meant that the compound was ultimately not developed further for such applications.

=== Pigment and other uses ===
The main non-research use of cerium(III) sulfide is as a specialty inorganic pigment. γ-Ce_{2}S_{3} is usually the main component of these pigments due to its bright red color. They are less toxic than heavy metal pigments such as cadmium sulfide, however, they are still hazardous due to the release of environmentally toxic cerium ions.

Regarding other applications, the γ-Ce_{2}S_{3} polymorph has a band gap of 2.06 eV and high Seebeck coefficient, thus it has been proposed as a high-temperature semiconductor for thermoelectric generators. A practical implementation thereof has not been demonstrated so far.
