= Rhodium(III) sulfide =

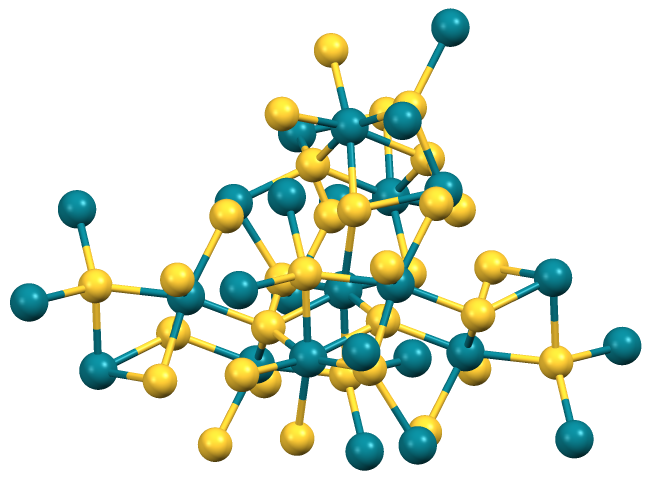

Names
- IUPAC name Rhodium(III) sulfide
- Other names Rhodium sesquisulfide

Identifiers
CAS Number	12067-06-0
3D model (JSmol)	Interactive image
ChemSpider	23349348
ECHA InfoCard	100.031.874
EC Number	235-075-0
PubChem CID	54672740
CompTox Dashboard (EPA)	DTXSID301014316
- InChI: Key: ILLXJAWVPNCIFC-UHFFFAOYSA-N; InChI=1S/2Rh.3S
- SMILES: S=[Rh]S[Rh]=S

Properties
Chemical formula	Rh_{2}S_{3}
Molar mass	301.99 g·mol^{−1}
Appearance	black solid
Density	6.46 g/cm^{−3}
Solubility in water	insoluble
- Except where otherwise noted, data are given for materials in their standard state (at 25 °C [77 °F], 100 kPa). Infobox references

Rhodium(III) sulfide is the inorganic compound with the formula Rh_{2}S_{3}. It is an insoluble black solid, prepared by the heating a mixture of elemental rhodium and sulfur. Crystals can be grown by chemical vapor transport using bromine as the transporting agent. The structure consists of octahedral and tetrahedral Rh and S centers, respectively. No close Rh-Rh contacts are observed. Rh_{2}Se_{3} and Ir_{2}S_{3} adopt the same structure as Rh_{2}S_{3}.
