= Titanium(III) oxide =

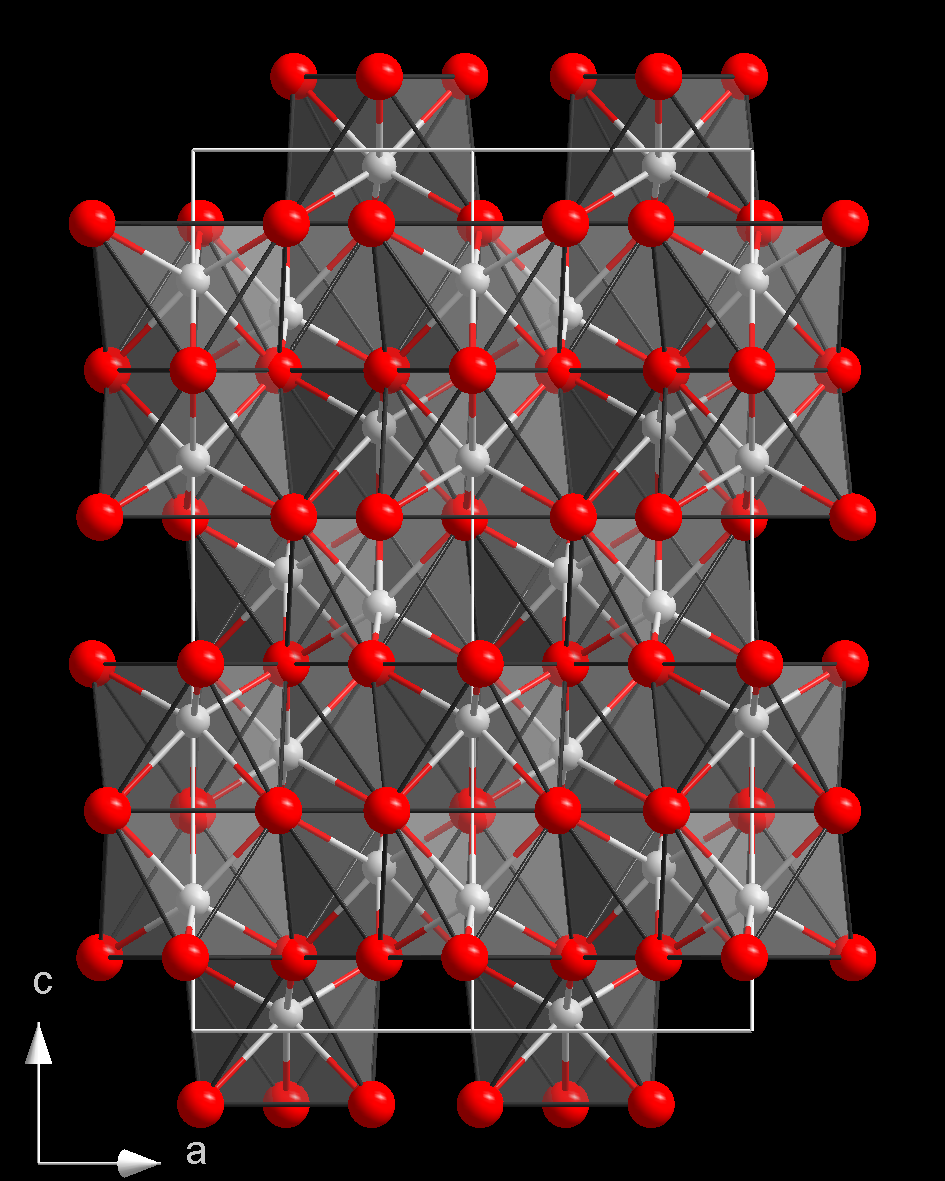

Names
- IUPAC name Titanium(III) oxide
- Other names: Titanium sesquioxide; Dititanium trioxide

Identifiers
CAS Number	1344-54-3
3D model (JSmol)	Interactive image
ChEBI	CHEBI:134436
ChemSpider	109727
ECHA InfoCard	100.014.271
EC Number	215-697-9
PubChem CID	123111
CompTox Dashboard (EPA)	DTXSID20893931
- InChI: InChI=1S/3O.2Ti Key: GQUJEMVIKWQAEH-UHFFFAOYSA-N
- SMILES: O=[Ti]O[Ti]=O

Properties
Chemical formula	Ti_{2}O_{3}
Molar mass	143.76 g/mol
Appearance	violet black powder
Odor	odorless
Density	4.49 g/cm^{3}
Melting point	2,130 °C (3,870 °F; 2,400 K) (decomposes)
Solubility in water	insoluble
Magnetic susceptibility (χ)	+125.6·10^{−6} cm^{3}/mol

Structure
Crystal structure	Corundum
Space group	R3̅c (No. 167)
Lattice constant	a = 543 pm α = 56.75°, β = 90°, γ = 90°

Hazards
- GHS labelling
Pictograms	(GHS09: Environmental hazard)
Signal word	Warning
Hazard statements	H413
- Except where otherwise noted, data are given for materials in their standard state (at 25 °C [77 °F], 100 kPa). verify (what is ?) Infobox references

Titanium(III) oxide is the inorganic compound with the formula Ti_{2}O_{3}. A black semiconducting solid, it is prepared by reducing titanium dioxide with titanium metal at 1600 °C.

Ti_{2}O_{3} adopts the Al_{2}O_{3} (corundum) structure. It is reactive with oxidising agents. At around 200 °C, there is a transition from semiconducting to metallic conducting. Titanium(III) oxide occurs naturally as the extremely rare mineral in the form of tistarite. It is used as a catalyst for several reactions.

Other titanium(III) oxides include LiTi_{2}O_{4} and LiTiO_{2}.
