= Scandium(III) sulfide =

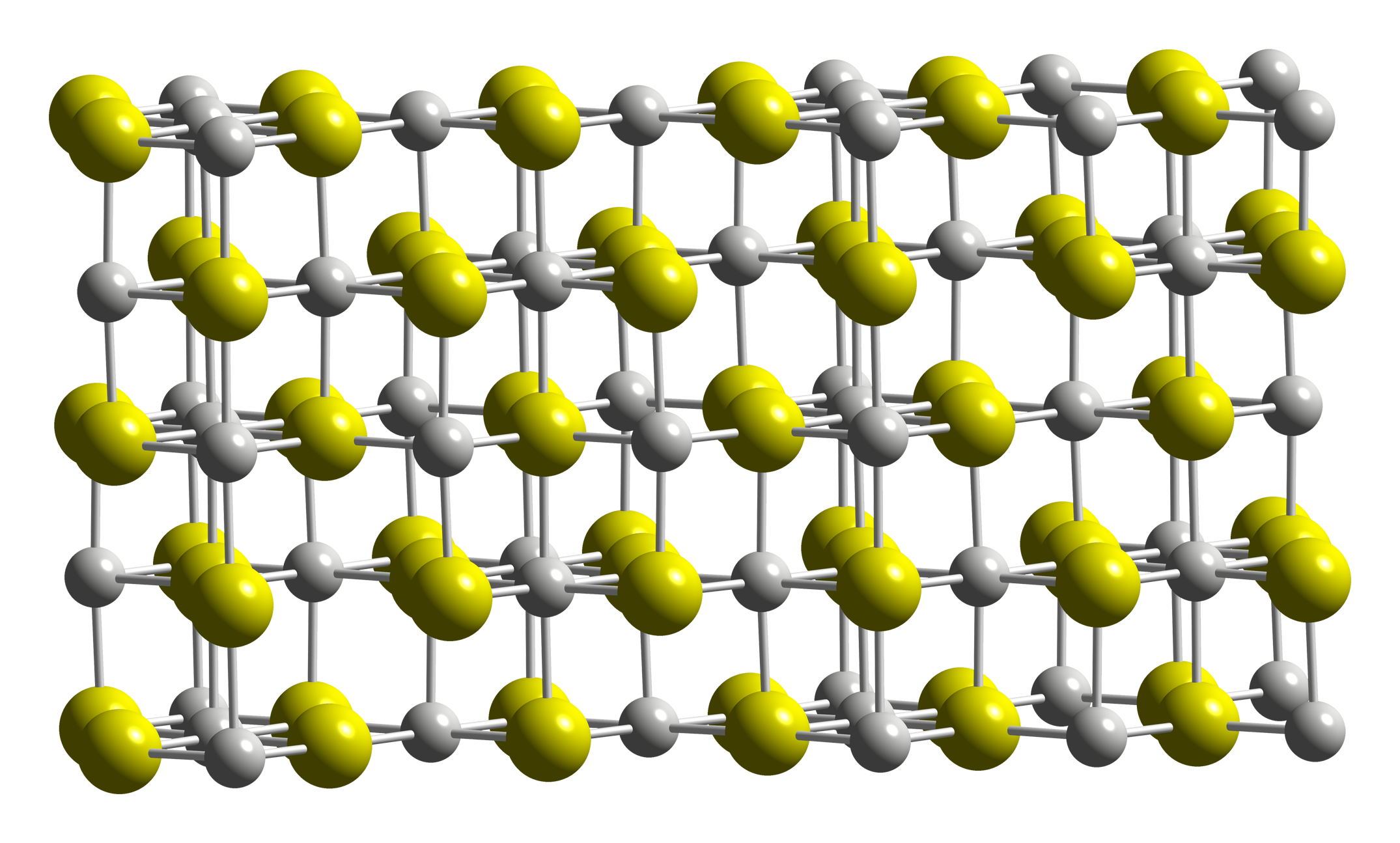
- Scandium(III) sulfide

Names
- Other names scandium sesquisulfide

Identifiers
CAS Number	12166-29-9
3D model (JSmol)	Interactive image
ChemSpider	145824
ECHA InfoCard	100.032.097
EC Number	235-320-1
PubChem CID	166646
CompTox Dashboard (EPA)	DTXSID10923918
- InChI: InChI=1S/3S.2Sc/q3*-2;2*+3 Key: KAYAWNAUDDJSHN-UHFFFAOYSA-N
- SMILES: [S-2].[S-2].[S-2].[Sc+3].[Sc+3]

Properties
Chemical formula	Sc_{2}S_{3}
Molar mass	186.11 g/mol
Appearance	yellow crystals
Density	2.91 g/cm^{3}, solid
Melting point	1,775 °C (3,227 °F; 2,048 K)

Structure
Crystal structure	orthorhombic

Related compounds
Other anions	Scandium oxide
Other cations	Yttrium(III) sulfide
- Except where otherwise noted, data are given for materials in their standard state (at 25 °C [77 °F], 100 kPa). verify (what is ?) Infobox references

Scandium(III) sulfide is a chemical compound of scandium and sulfur with the chemical formula Sc_{2}S_{3}. It is a yellow solid.

== Structure ==
The crystal structure of Sc_{2}S_{3} is closely related to that of sodium chloride, in that it is based on a cubic close packed array of anions. Whereas NaCl has all the octahedral interstices in the anion lattice occupied by cations, Sc_{2}S_{3} has one third of them vacant. The vacancies are ordered, but in a very complicated pattern, leading to a large, orthorhombic unit cell belonging to the space group Fddd.

== Synthesis ==
Metal sulfides are usually prepared by heating mixtures of the two elements, but in the case of scandium, this method yields scandium monosulfide, ScS. Sc_{2}S_{3} can be prepared by heating scandium(III) oxide under flowing hydrogen sulfide in a graphite crucible to 1550 °C or above for 2–3 hours. The crude product is then purified by chemical vapor transport at 950 °C using iodine as the transport agent.

Sc_{2}O_{3} + 3H_{2}S → Sc_{2}S_{3} + 3H_{2}O

Scandium(III) sulfide can be prepared by reacting scandium(III) chloride with dry hydrogen sulfide at elevated temperature:

2 ScCl_{3} + 3 H_{2}S → Sc_{2}S_{3} + 6 HCl

== Reactivity ==
Above 1100 °C, Sc_{2}S_{3} loses sulfur, forming nonstoichiometric compounds such as Sc_{1.37}S_{2}.
