= Praseodymium ditelluride =

Names
- Other names Praseodymium telluride

Identifiers
3D model (JSmol)	Interactive image
- InChI: InChI=1S/Pr.2Te
- SMILES: [Pr].[Te].[Te]

Properties
Chemical formula	PrTe_{2}
Molar mass	396.11 g/mol

Structure
Crystal structure	Tetragonal
Space group	P4
Lattice constant	a = 0.89680 nm, c = 1.8119 nm
Formula units (Z)	16
- Except where otherwise noted, data are given for materials in their standard state (at 25 °C [77 °F], 100 kPa). Infobox references

Praseodymium ditelluride is an inorganic compound of praseodymium and tellurium with the formula PrTe_{2}. It is a layered rare-earth telluride in which praseodymium is essentially trivalent and the tellurium atoms form several types of polyanionic Te–Te units. It exhibits strongly two-dimensional metallic electronic behaviour and a charge-density wave state.

== Preparation ==
Single crystals of PrTe_{2} can be prepared by chemical vapor transport from praseodymium and tellurium using small amounts of iodine as a transport agent:

Pr + 2 Te → PrTe_{2}

== Properties ==
=== Structure ===
PrTe_{2} crystallizes in the tetragonal crystal system, space group P4, with lattice parameters a = 8.9680(5) Å and c = 18.119(1) Å and 16 formula units per unit cell. Its structure is a 2 × 2 × 2 superstructure of the simpler anti-Fe_{2}As-type rare-earth ditelluride structure. It is isotypic with CeTe_{2}, whereas LaTe_{2} adopts a related monoclinically distorted superstructure. The structure consists of alternating praseodymium–tellurium slabs and planar polytelluride layers. The latter contain several distinct Te–Te bonding motifs, including Te_{2} dumbbells arranged in a herringbone pattern and both approximately square and rectangular Te_{4} units. These different arrangements occur in different tellurium layers along the crystallographic c direction and account for the doubling of the superstructure relative to that found in LaTe_{2}. Diffraction data indicate that the different polytelluride arrangements can occur as microdomains. The bonding is consistent with essentially Pr^{3+}, while the tellurium sublattice carries the remaining negative charge through Te–Te bonded polyanions rather than consisting entirely of isolated Te^{2−} ions.

=== Electronic properties ===
PrTe_{2} is metallic. Photoemission measurements show a clear Fermi edge and electronic states crossing the Fermi level. Angle-resolved photoemission spectroscopy shows very weak dispersion perpendicular to the tellurium sheets, demonstrating that the electronic structure is predominantly two-dimensional. PrTe_{2} forms a charge-density-wave state associated primarily with the partially filled Te 5p bands of the planar tellurium sheets. The charge-density wave reconstructs the Fermi surface but does not completely gap it, so the material remains metallic. More recent X-ray absorption and photoemission measurements confirm that praseodymium is close to the +3 oxidation state. The Pr 4f electrons do not directly form the charge-density wave, although hybridization between Pr 4f and Te 5p states may influence it indirectly.

=== Magnetic properties ===
PrTe_{2} is strongly magnetically anisotropic as a result of the crystalline electric field acting on Pr^{3+}. In contrast to several related rare-earth ditellurides, PrTe_{2} shows no clear magnetic-ordering transition in measurements down to approximately 1.5 K. Specific-heat measurements between 1.5 and 200 K likewise found no sharp anomaly attributable to magnetic ordering in PrTe_{2}.
