= Scandium perchlorate =

Chemical compound

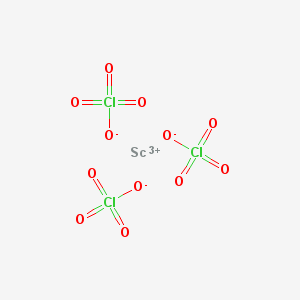
- structure of scandium perchlorate

Identifiers
| CAS Number | 14066-05-8 |
| 3D model (JSmol) | Interactive image |
| ChemSpider | 9188503 |
| ECHA InfoCard | 100.034.453 |
| EC Number | 237-914-6 |
| PubChem CID | 11013318 |
| UN number | 3098 |
- InChI: InChI=1S/3ClHO4.Sc/c3*2-1(3,4)5;/h3*(H,2,3,4,5);/q;;;+3/p-3 Key: UBVKRMCXDCYZQK-UHFFFAOYSA-K
- SMILES: [O-]Cl(=O)(=O)=O.[O-]Cl(=O)(=O)=O.[O-]Cl(=O)(=O)=O.[Sc+3]

Properties
| Chemical formula | Sc(ClO_{4})_{3} |
| Molar mass | 343.308 |
| Density | 1.449 |
| Solubility | soluble |
| Vapor pressure | 0.12 |

Hazards
- GHS labelling
| Pictograms | (GHS03: Oxidizing) (GHS05: Corrosive) |
| Signal word | Danger |
| Hazard statements | H272, H314 |
| Precautionary statements | P210, P220, P221, P260, P264, P280, P301+P330+P331, P303+P361+P353, P304+P340, P305+P351+P338, P310, P321, P363, P370+P378, P405, P501 |
- Except where otherwise noted, data are given for materials in their standard state (at 25 °C [77 °F], 100 kPa). Infobox references

Scandium perchlorate is an inorganic compound with the chemical formula Sc(ClO_{4})_{3}.

== Production ==
Scandium perchlorate can be prepared by dissolving scandium oxide in perchloric acid:

Sc_{2}O_{3} + 6HClO_{4} → 2Sc(ClO_{4})_{3} + 3H_{2}O
