= Samarium(III) sulfate =

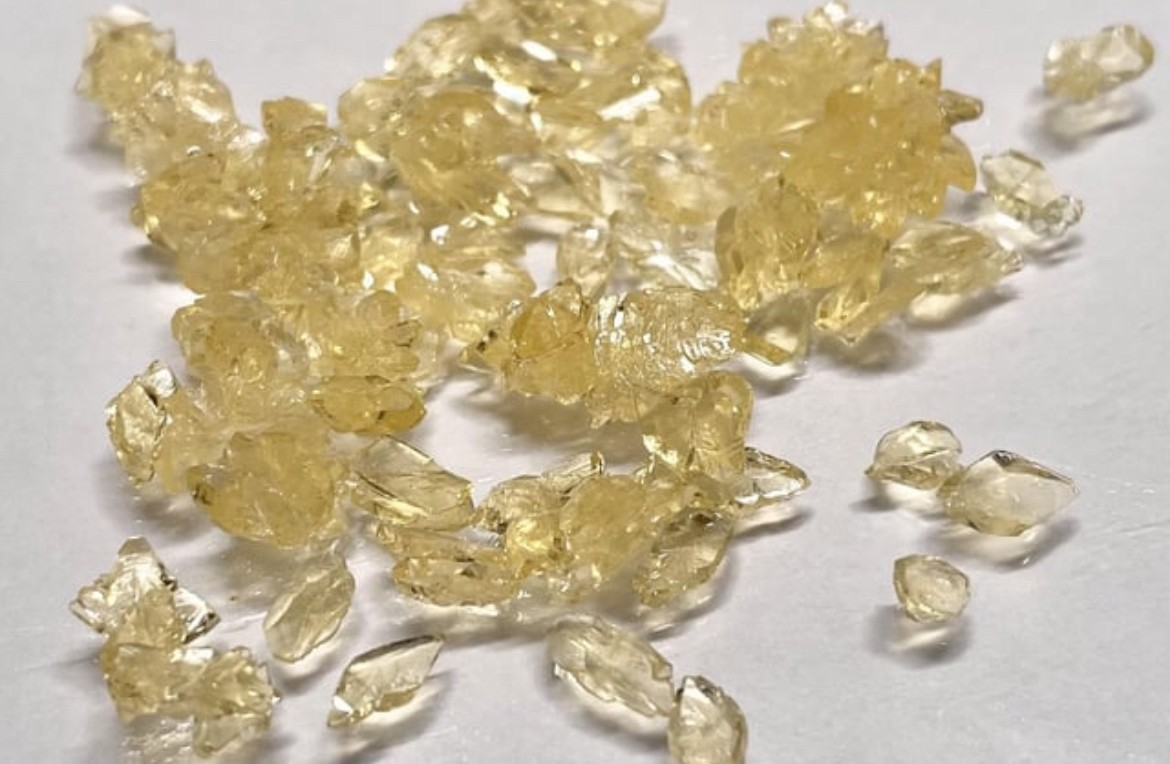

Names
- Other names: Disamarium trisulfate

Identifiers
CAS Number	anhydrous: 13692-98-3; octahydrate: 13465-58-2
3D model (JSmol)	anhydrous: Interactive image; octahydrate: Interactive image
ChemSpider	anhydrous: 146014
ECHA InfoCard	100.154.513
EC Number	anhydrous: 237-211-4; octahydrate: 626-078-1
PubChem CID	anhydrous: 166884; octahydrate: 71311263
CompTox Dashboard (EPA)	DTXSID70890713
- InChI: anhydrous: InChI=1S/3H2O4S.2Sm/c3*1-5(2,3)4;;/h3*(H2,1,2,3,4);;/q;;;2*+3/p-6 Key: LVSITDBROURTQX-UHFFFAOYSA-H; octahydrate: InChI=1S/3H2O4S.8H2O.2Sm/c3*1-5(2,3)4;;;;;;;;;;/h3*(H2,1,2,3,4);8*1H2;;/q;;;;;;;;;;;2*+3/p-6 Key: SICAFVHZPBSARB-UHFFFAOYSA-H
- SMILES: anhydrous: [O-]S(=O)(=O)[O-].[O-]S(=O)(=O)[O-].[O-]S(=O)(=O)[O-].[Sm+3].[Sm+3]; octahydrate: O.O.O.O.O.O.O.O.[O-]S(=O)(=O)[O-].[O-]S(=O)(=O)[O-].[O-]S(=O)(=O)[O-].[Sm+3].[Sm+3]

Properties
Chemical formula	Sm_{2}(SO_{4})_{3}
Molar mass	588.89 g·mol^{−1}
Appearance	white solid
Density	2.92 g/cm^{3}
Melting point	450 °C (842 °F; 723 K) (dehydrates to anhydrous form)
Solubility in water	4.4 g/100 mL (25 °C); 1.99 g/100 mL (40 °C) (octahydrate)

Structure
Crystal structure	monoclinic (octahydrate)
Space group	C2/c (No. 15)
Lattice constant	a = 13.43 Å, b = 6.72 Å, c = 18.13 Å α = 90°, β = 102.8°, γ = 90°

Hazards
- GHS labelling
Pictograms	(GHS07: Exclamation mark)
Signal word	Warning
Hazard statements	H315, H319, H335
Precautionary statements	P261, P264, P264+P265, P271, P280, P302+P352, P304+P340, P305+P351+P338, P319, P321, P332+P317, P337+P317, P362+P364, P403+P233, P405, P501
- Except where otherwise noted, data are given for materials in their standard state (at 25 °C [77 °F], 100 kPa). Infobox references

Samarium(III) sulfate is a samarium compound with the chemical formula Sm_{2}(SO_{4})_{3}. A hygroscopic white octahydrate exists as well as a pentahydrate.

== Properties ==
The octahydrate exhibits mechanoluminescence under ultrasonic action.

== Structure ==
The octahydrate forms monoclinic crystals (space group C2/c (No. 15)). The pentahydrate has the same space group and the following cell parameters: a = 15.653 Å, b = 9.5369 Å, c = 10.199 Å, β = 120.36°, V = 1313.9 Å^{3}, Z = 1).

== Preparation ==
Samarium(III) sulfate can be prepared by treating samarium oxide with sulfuric acid.

== Reactions ==
The hydrated compound dehydrates between 100 °C and 300 °C. The anhydrous compound decomposes at approximately 700 °C forming the oxysulfate (Sm_{2}O_{2}SO_{4}). Upon further heating, the oxysulfate decomposes to samarium oxide above 1210 °C.

Samarium oxysulfide (Sm_{2}O_{2}S) can be obtained by the reduction of samarium sulfate with hydrogen at 700 °C.

== Related compounds ==
Several samarium double sulfates have been characterized by single-crystal X-ray diffraction; for example, ammonium samarium sulfate tetrahydrate (NH_{4}Sm(SO_{4})_{2}·H_{2}O).

Several organic amine templated samarium sulfates have also been characterized.

=== Samarium(II) sulfate ===
Samarium(II) sulfate is unstable. An orange suspension of samarous sulfate can be obtained by treating aqueous samarium chloride containing 5-10% ethanol with magnesium and a little sulfuric acid.
