= Titanium trisulfide =

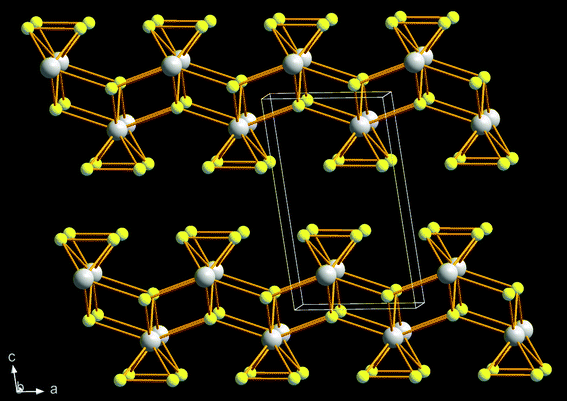

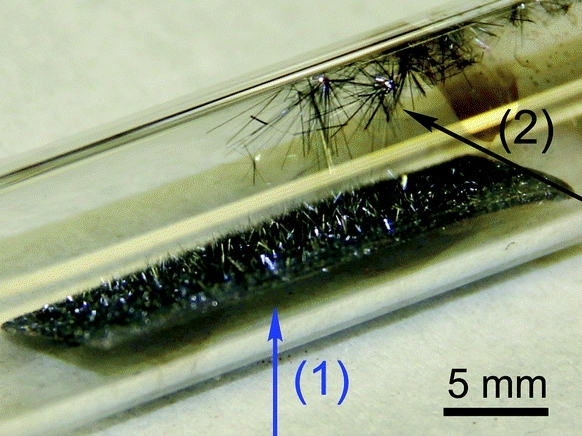

Names
- Other names Titanium(IV) sulfide

Identifiers
CAS Number	12423-80-2
3D model (JSmol)	covalent form: Interactive image; ionic form: Interactive image
ChemSpider	50645119
- InChI: InChI=1S/3S.Ti Key: HOZYDKBKUUVYKD-UHFFFAOYSA-N; InChI=1S/S2.S.Ti/c1-2;;/q2*-2;+4 Key: KVFIBOBJNNMQLV-UHFFFAOYSA-N
- SMILES: covalent form: [Ti]1(=S)SS1; ionic form: [S-][S-].[S-2].[Ti+4]

Properties
Chemical formula	TiS_{3}
Molar mass	144.062 g/mol
Appearance	Black whiskers
Band gap	1 eV (indirect)
Electron mobility	80 cm^{2}/(V·s)

Structure
Crystal structure	Monoclinic, mP8
Space group	P2_{1}/m, No. 11
Lattice constant	a = 0.4973 nm, b = 0.3443 nm, c = 0.8714 nm α = 90°, β = 97.74°, γ = 90°
Formula units (Z)	2
- Except where otherwise noted, data are given for materials in their standard state (at 25 °C [77 °F], 100 kPa). Infobox references

Titanium trisulfide (TiS_{3}) is an inorganic chemical compound of titanium and sulfur. Its formula unit contains one Ti^{4+} cation, one S^{2−} anion and one S_{2}^{2−}.

TiS_{3} has a layered crystal structure, where the layers are weakly bonded to each other and can be exfoliated with an adhesive tape. The exfoliated layers have potential applications in ultrathin field-effect transistors.

== Synthesis ==
Millimeter-long crystalline whiskers of TiS_{3} can be grown by chemical vapor transport at ca. 500 °C, using excess sulfur as the transporting gas.

== Properties ==
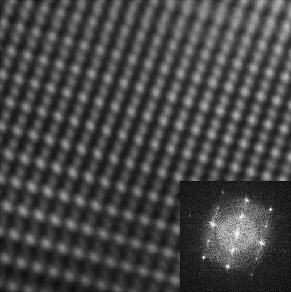
Transmission electron micrograph of TiS_{3} revealing its layered structure

TiS_{3} is an n-type semiconductor with an indirect bandgap of about 1 eV. Its individual layers are made of TiS atomic chains; hence they are anisotropic and their properties depend on the in-plane orientation. For example, in the same sample, electron mobility can be 80 cm^{2}/(V·s) along the b-axis and 40 cm^{2}/(V·s) along the a-axis.
