= Tistarite =

Titanium oxide mineral

General
- Category: Oxide minerals
- Formula: Ti_{2}O_{3}
- IMA symbol: Tta
- Strunz classification: 4.CB.05
- Crystal system: Trigonal
- Crystal class: Hexagonal scalenohedral (3̅m); H-M symbol: (3̅ 2/m)
- Space group: R3̅c

Identification

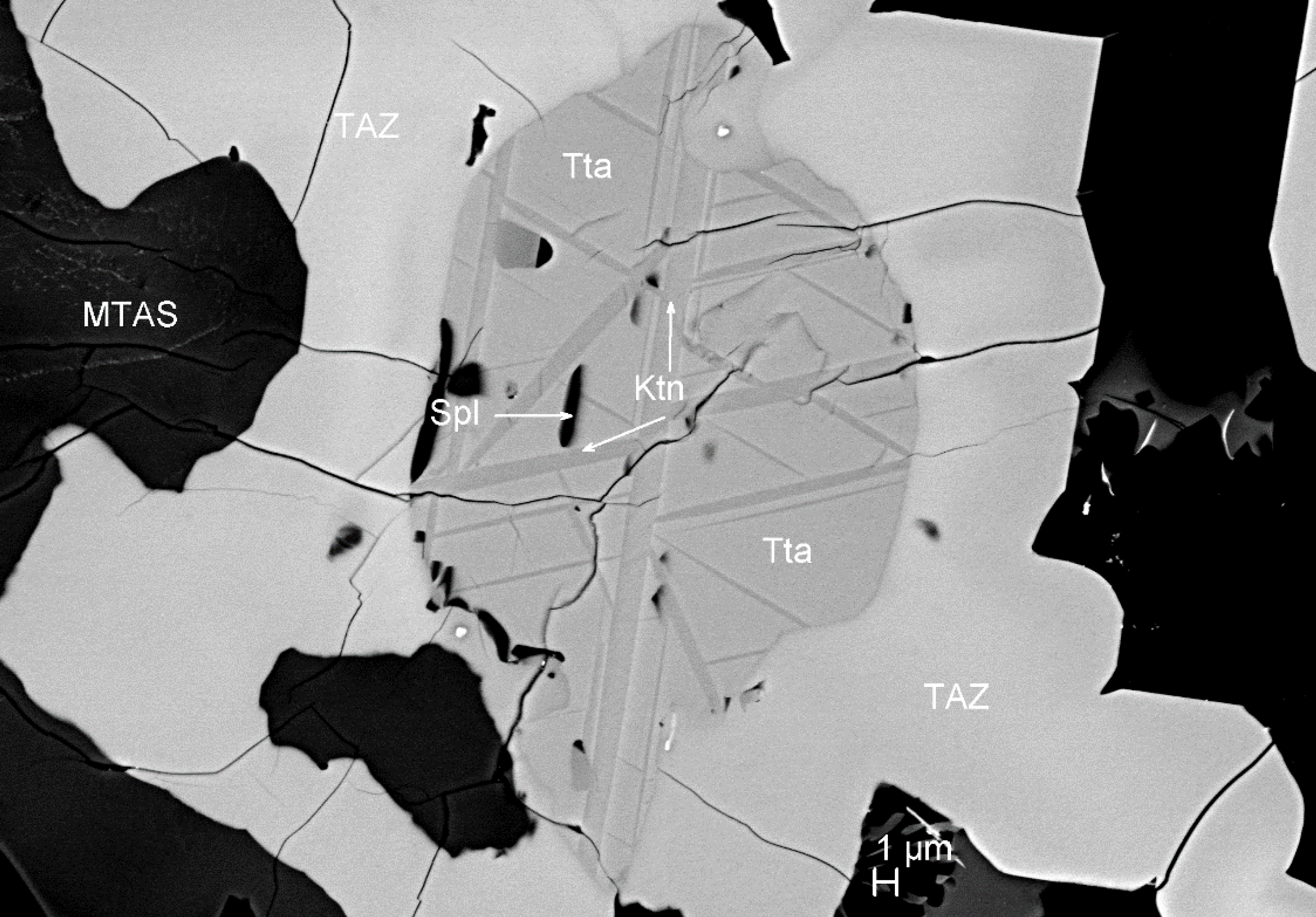
SEM BSE images showing kaitianite (Ktn) with tistarite (Tta), Ti,Al,Zr-oxide (TAZ), MgTi3+2Al4SiO12 phase (MTAS), spinel (Spl), sapphirine (Spr), and Ti-sulfide (Ti-S) in corundum Grain 1125C2. The upper rectangular area in (b) are enlarged in (c)

Tistarite is an exceedingly rare mineral with the formula Ti_{2}O_{3}, thus being the natural analogue of titanium(III) oxide. In terms of chemistry it is the titanium-analogue of hematite, corundum, eskolaite, and karelianite. Other minerals with the general formula A_{2}O_{3} are arsenolite, avicennite, claudetite, bismite, bixbyite, kangite, sphaerobismoite, yttriaite-(Y) and valentinite. Tistarite and grossmanite – both found in the famous Allende meteorite (so is kangite) – are the only currently known minerals with trivalent titanium. Titanium in minerals is almost exclusively tetravalent. The only known terrestrial occurrence of tistarite was found during minerals exploration by Shefa Yamim Ltd. in the upper mantle beneath Mount Carmel, Israel.
