= Inorganic carbodiimide =

Class of chemical compounds

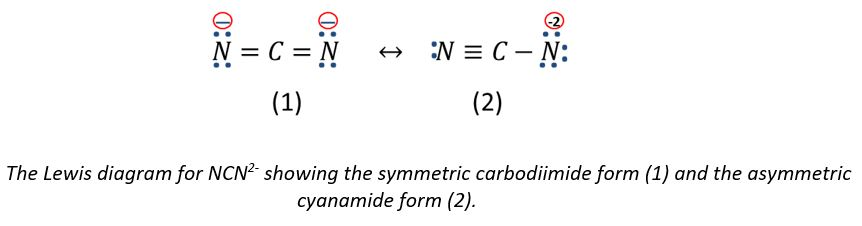
The Lewis diagram for NCN^{2-} showing the symmetric carbodiimide form (1) and the asymmetric cyanamide form (2)

Inorganic carbodiimides (or cyanamides depending on the NCN^{2-} form) design a family of compounds containing the carbodiimide (or cyanamide) anion NCN^{2-} bonded to an inorganic group such as a metal. This anion exhibits pseudochalcogenide character.

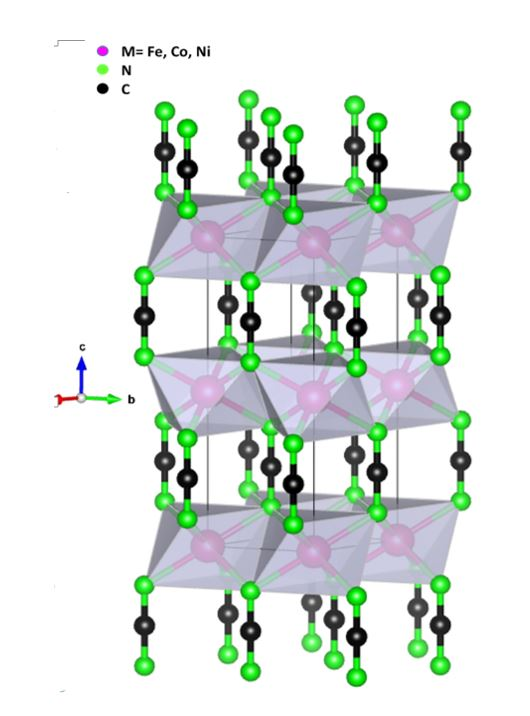
Crystal structure of TNCN, M= Fe, Co, Ni

== History ==
Adolph Frank and Nikodem Caro were the first to synthesize calcium cyanamide (CaNCN) and to develop a route for its production at the industrial level in 1898. But, the very first beginning of the metal carbodiimides/cyanamides goes back to the 1870s. One can find detailed reports by E. Drechsel on the preparation of Ag_{2}NCN, CaNCN, BaNCN, K_{2}NCN and Li_{2}NCN between 1875 and 1898 (before even XRD invention). The preparation of Cd, Zn, Tl, Cu, Pb and Hg carboimides has been described during the 1950s. CaNCN is by the far the most known since it has been produced since 1898 and used as a fertilizer.

Starting from 2000s, rare earth metal carbodiimides Ln_{2}(NCN)_{3} (Ln = La, Ce, Nd, Pm, Sm, Eu, Gd, Tb, Dy, Ho, Er, Tm and Tm) and transition metal carbodiimides TNCN (T= Mn, Fe, Co, Ni, Cu) and Cr_{2}(NCN)_{3}have been reported. Non-metallic carbodiimides are also known such as Si(NCN)_{2}.

== Structure ==
T_{x}(NCN)_{y} binaries adopt generally structures with cationic layers made of octahedrally coordinated T^{2+}/T^{3+} cations alternating with anionic layers of NCN^{2–} in various structures such as rock-salt, NiAs- and NaN_{3}-like structures. A side of binary carbodiimides, ternary (SrZn(NCN)2) and quaternary ones (Li_{2}Sm_{2}Sr(NCN)_{5} ) have also been prepared via solid-state metathesis.

Dimorphism is observed in inorganic carbodiimide. HgNCN for example can adopt two structures with two different NCN configurations, this means that HgNCN can have either carbodiimide or cyanamide structures.

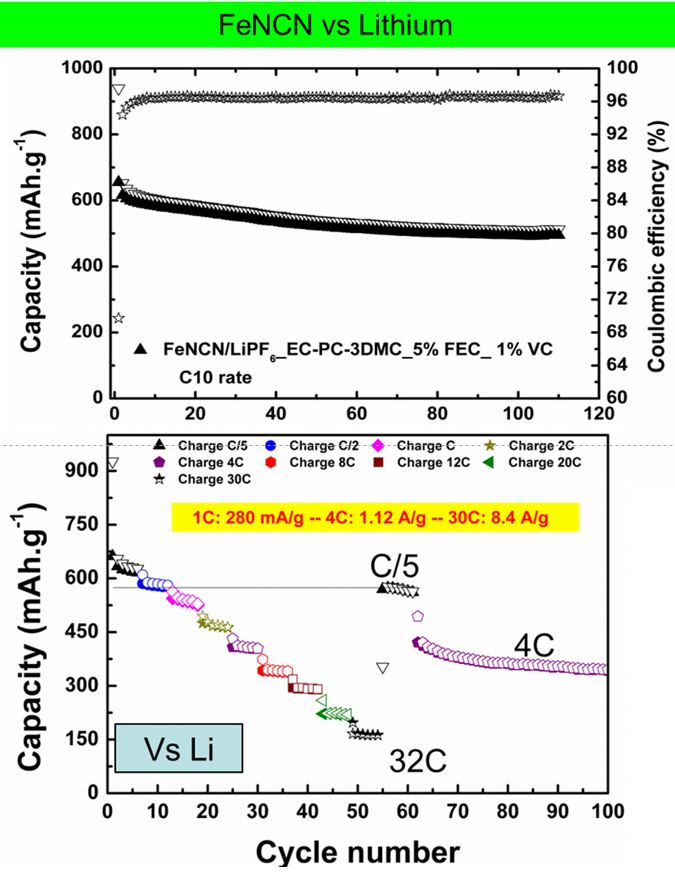
Electrochemical performance of FeNCN as anode material for Li-ion batteries

Recently, metal carbodiimides are explored as anode materials for lithium and sodium ion batteries and found to present better specific capacities compared to conventional graphite and hard carbon electrode materials.
