= Kangite =

Rare scandium mineral

General
- Category: Minerals
- Formula: (Sc,Ti,Al,Zr,Mg,Ca,□)_{2}O_{3}

Kangite is an exceedingly rare scandium mineral, a natural form of impure scandium oxide (Sc_{2}O_{3}), with the formula (Sc,Ti,Al,Zr,Mg,Ca,□)_{2}O_{3}. It crystallizes in the cubic crystal system diploidal class. In terms of chemistry it scandium-analogue of tistarite. Both kangite and tistarite were discovered in the Allende meteorite.
