= Indium(III) oxide =

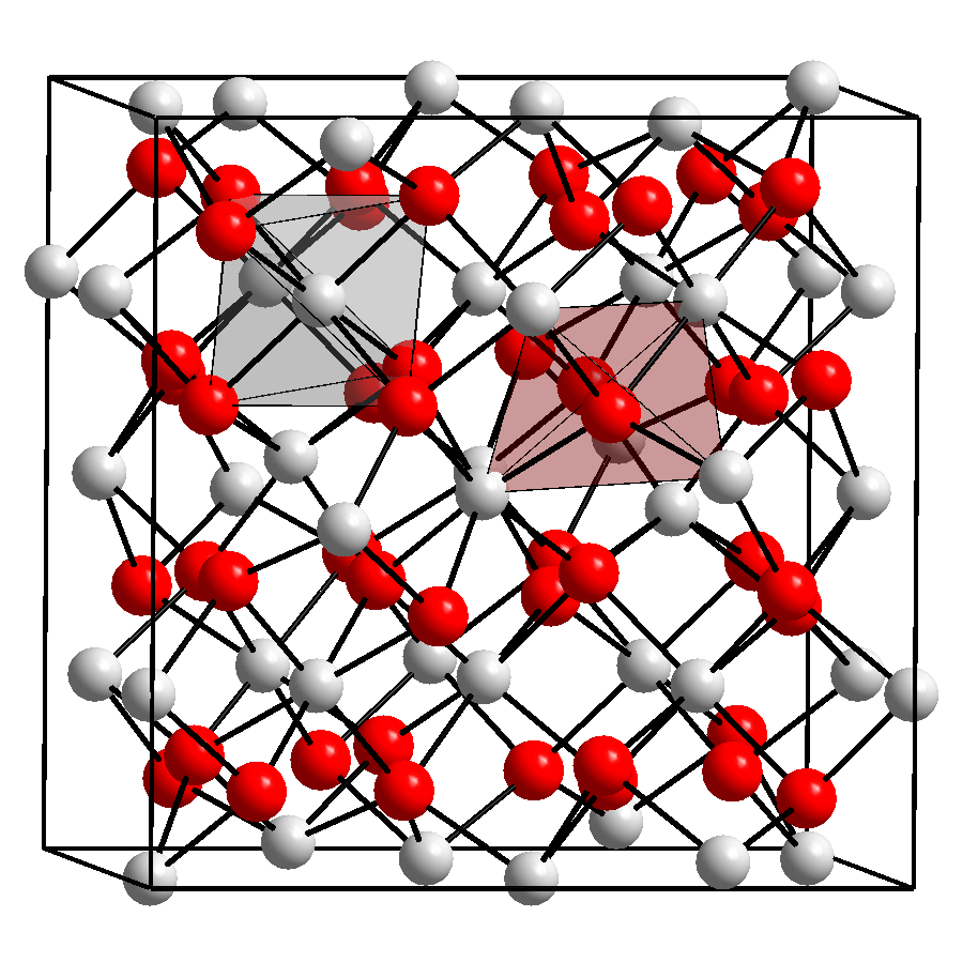

Names
- Other names indium trioxide, indium sesquioxide

Identifiers
CAS Number	1312-43-2
3D model (JSmol)	Interactive image
ChemSpider	133007
ECHA InfoCard	100.013.813
EC Number	215-193-9
PubChem CID	150905
UNII	4OO9KME22D
CompTox Dashboard (EPA)	DTXSID40893857
- InChI: InChI=1S/2In.3O/q2*+3;3*-2 Key: PJXISJQVUVHSOJ-UHFFFAOYSA-N; InChI=1/2In.3O/q2*+3;3*-2 Key: PJXISJQVUVHSOJ-UHFFFAOYAL
- SMILES: [O-2].[O-2].[O-2].[In+3].[In+3]

Properties
Chemical formula	In_{2}O_{3}
Molar mass	277.64 g/mol
Appearance	yellowish green odorless crystals
Density	7.179 g/cm^{3}
Melting point	1,910 °C (3,470 °F; 2,180 K)
Solubility in water	insoluble
Band gap	~3 eV (300 K)
Magnetic susceptibility (χ)	−56.0·10^{−6} cm^{3}/mol

Structure
Crystal structure	Cubic, (Bixbyite) cI80
Space group	Ia3̅, No. 206
Lattice constant	a = 1.0117(1) nm
Formula units (Z)	16 formula per cell

Hazards
- GHS labelling
Pictograms	(GHS07: Exclamation mark) (GHS08: Health hazard)
Signal word	Danger
Hazard statements	H315, H319, H335
Precautionary statements	P260, P264, P270, P271, P280, P302+P352, P304+P340, P305+P351+P338, P312, P314, P321, P332+P313, P337+P313, P362, P403+P233, P405, P501
NFPA 704 (fire diamond)	1 0 0
- Except where otherwise noted, data are given for materials in their standard state (at 25 °C [77 °F], 100 kPa). verify (what is ?) Infobox references

Indium(III) oxide (In_{2}O_{3}) is a chemical compound, an amphoteric oxide of indium.

== Physical properties ==
=== Crystal structure ===
Amorphous indium oxide is insoluble in water but soluble in acids, whereas crystalline indium oxide is insoluble in both water and acids. The crystalline form exists in two phases, the cubic (bixbyite type) and rhombohedral (corundum type). Both phases have a band gap of about 3 eV. The parameters of the cubic phase are listed in the infobox.

The rhombohedral phase is produced at high temperatures and pressures or when using non-equilibrium growth methods. It has a space group R3̅c No. 167, Pearson symbol hR30, a = 0.5487 nm, b = 0.5487 nm, c = 1.4510 nm, Z = 6 and calculated density 7.31 g/cm^{3}.

=== Conductivity and magnetism ===
Thin films of chromium-doped indium oxide (In_{2−x}Cr_{x}O_{3}) are a magnetic semiconductor displaying high-temperature ferromagnetism, single-phase crystal structure, and semiconductor behavior with high concentration of charge carriers. It has possible applications in spintronics as a material for spin injectors.

Thin polycrystalline films of indium oxide doped with Zn^{2+} are highly conductive (conductivity ~10^{5} S/m) and even superconductive at liquid helium temperatures. The superconducting transition temperature T_{c} depends on the doping and film structure and is below 3.3 K.

== Synthesis ==
Bulk samples can be prepared by heating indium(III) hydroxide or the nitrate, carbonate or sulfate. Thin films of indium oxide can be prepared by sputtering of indium targets in an argon/oxygen atmosphere. They can be used as diffusion barriers ("barrier metals") in semiconductors, e.g. to inhibit diffusion between aluminium and silicon.

Monocrystalline nanowires can be synthesized from indium oxide by laser ablation, allowing precise diameter control down to 10 nm. Field effect transistors were fabricated from those. Indium oxide nanowires can serve as sensitive and specific redox protein sensors. The sol–gel method is another way to prepare nanowires.

Indium oxide can serve as a semiconductor material, forming heterojunctions with p-InP, n-GaAs, n-Si, and other materials. A layer of indium oxide on a silicon substrate can be deposited from an indium trichloride solution, a method useful for manufacture of solar cells.

== Reactions ==
When heated to 700 °C, indium(III) oxide forms In_{2}O, (called indium(I) oxide or indium suboxide), at 2000 °C it decomposes. It is soluble in acids but not in alkali. With ammonia at high temperature indium nitride is formed:

In_{2}O_{3} + 2 NH_{3} → 2 InN + 3 H_{2}O

With K_{2}O and indium metal the compound K_{5}InO_{4} containing tetrahedral InO_{4}^{5−} ions was prepared. Reacting with a range of metal trioxides produces perovskites for example:

In_{2}O_{3} + Cr_{2}O_{3} → 2InCrO_{3}

== Applications ==
Indium oxide is used in some types of batteries, thin film infrared reflectors transparent for visible light (hot mirrors), some optical coatings, and some antistatic coatings. In combination with tin dioxide, indium oxide forms indium tin oxide (also called tin doped indium oxide or ITO), a material used for transparent conductive coatings.

In semiconductors, indium oxide can be used as an n-type semiconductor used as a resistive element in integrated circuits.

In histology, indium oxide is used as a part of some stain formulations.

== See also ==
- Indium
- Indium tin oxide
- Magnetic semiconductor
