= Iridium(III) sulfide =

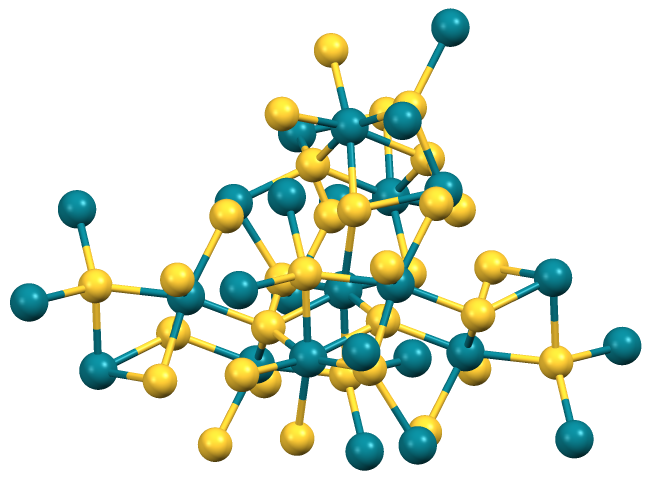

Identifiers
CAS Number	12136-42-4
3D model (JSmol)	Interactive image
PubChem CID	165360246
CompTox Dashboard (EPA)	DTXSID801337333
- InChI: Key: UVJVOJHPJVDQLS-UHFFFAOYSA-N; InChI=1S/2Ir.3S
- SMILES: S=[Ir]S[Ir]=S

Properties
Chemical formula	Ir_{2}S_{3}
Molar mass	480.61 g·mol^{−1}
Appearance	black solid
Solubility in water	insoluble

Hazards
- Occupational safety and health (OHS/OSH)
Main hazards	very flammable
Flash point	none

Related compounds
Other cations	Rhodium(III) sulfide
- Except where otherwise noted, data are given for materials in their standard state (at 25 °C [77 °F], 100 kPa). Infobox references

Iridium(III) sulfide is the inorganic compound with the formula Ir_{2}S_{3}. It is an insoluble black solid, prepared by heating a mixture of elemental iridium and sulfur. Crystals can be grown by chemical vapor transport using bromine as the transporting agent. The structure consists of octahedral and tetrahedral Ir and S centers, respectively. No close Ir-Ir contacts are observed. Rh_{2}S_{3} and Rh_{2}Se_{3} adopt the same structure.
