= Ytterbium(III) sulfide =

Names
- Other names Ytterbium sulfide, diytterbium trisulfide, ytterbium sesquisulfide

Identifiers
CAS Number	12039-20-2
3D model (JSmol)	Interactive image
ChemSpider	145470
ECHA InfoCard	100.031.704
EC Number	234-888-8
PubChem CID	166022
CompTox Dashboard (EPA)	90923375
- InChI: InChI=1S/S.Yb Key: QHGZBASAVJOMNS-UHFFFAOYSA-N
- SMILES: [Yb].[S]

Properties
Chemical formula	S_{3}Yb_{2}
Molar mass	442.27 g·mol^{−1}
Appearance	yellow crystals
Density	6.02 g/cm^{3}
Solubility in water	insoluble

Structure
Crystal structure	rhombic
- Except where otherwise noted, data are given for materials in their standard state (at 25 °C [77 °F], 100 kPa). Infobox references

Ytterbium(III) sulfide is a binary inorganic compound of ytterbium and sulfur with the chemical formula Yb_{2}S_{3}. It is a yellow solid of rhombic symmetry, and cell parameters a = 0.678 nm, b = 0.995 nm, c = 0.361 nm.

== Synthesis ==
Ytterbium(III) sulfide can be produced by treating metallic ytterbium with sulfur:

2Sm + 3S → Sm_{2}S_{3}

Once prepared, ytterbium(III) sulfide can be purified by chemical vapor transport using iodine.

Ytterbium(III) sulfide can also be prepared by treating the sulfate with hydrogen sulfide at elevated temperatures:

Yb_{2}(SO_{4})_{3} + 12 H_{2}S → Yb_{2}S_{3} + 12 H_{2}O + 12 S
