= Yttrium(III) sulfide =

Names
- IUPAC name Yttrium(III) sulfide
- Other names Yttrium sulfide

Identifiers
CAS Number	12039-19-9
3D model (JSmol)	Interactive image
ChemSpider	145469
ECHA InfoCard	100.031.703
EC Number	234-887-2
PubChem CID	166021
CompTox Dashboard (EPA)	DTXSID30923374
- InChI: InChI=1S/3S.2Y/q3*-2;2*+3 Key: BPMRLDMEAPSVQN-UHFFFAOYSA-N
- SMILES: [S-2].[S-2].[S-2].[Y+3].[Y+3]

Properties
Chemical formula	Y_{2}S_{3}
Molar mass	274.010 g/mol
Appearance	yellow cubic crystals
Density	3.87 g/cm^{3}
Melting point	1,925 °C (3,497 °F; 2,198 K)

Structure
Crystal structure	cubic

Hazards
- GHS labelling
Pictograms	(GHS02: Flammable) (GHS07: Exclamation mark)
Signal word	Warning
Hazard statements	H261, H315, H319, H335
Precautionary statements	P231+P232, P261, P264, P271, P280, P302+P352, P304+P340, P305+P351+P338, P312, P321, P332+P313, P337+P313, P362, P370+P378, P402+P404, P403+P233, P405, P501

Related compounds
Other anions	Yttrium(III) oxide
Other cations	Scandium(III) sulfide
- Except where otherwise noted, data are given for materials in their standard state (at 25 °C [77 °F], 100 kPa). verify (what is ?) Infobox references

Yttrium(III) sulfide (Y_{2}S_{3}) is an inorganic chemical compound. It is a compound of yttrium and sulfur.
