= Tellurium bromide =

Tellurium bromide may refer to:

- Ditellurium bromide, Te_{2}Br
- Tellurium tetrabromide, TeBr_{4}
