= Samarium chloride =

Samarium chloride may refer to:

- Samarium(III) chloride (samarium trichloride), SmCl_{3}
- Samarium(II) chloride (samarium dichloride), SmCl_{2}
