= Lutetium(III) sulfide =

Names
- Other names Lutetium sesquisulfide

Identifiers
| CAS Number | 12163-20-1 |
| ChemSpider | 145821 |
| ECHA InfoCard | 100.032.085 |
| EC Number | 235-307-0 |
| PubChem CID | 166643 |
| CompTox Dashboard (EPA) | DTXSID10923897 |

Properties
| Chemical formula | Lu_{2}S_{3} |
| Molar mass | 446.13 g/mol |
| Appearance | Grey crystalline solid |
| Density | 6.26 g/cm^{3} |
| Melting point | 1,755 °C (3,191 °F; 2,028 K) |
- Except where otherwise noted, data are given for materials in their standard state (at 25 °C [77 °F], 100 kPa). Infobox references

Lutetium(III) sulfide, also known as lutetium sesquisulfide, is an inorganic compound of lutetium and sulfur with the chemical formula Lu_{2}S_{3}. It is one of the binary sulfides of lutetium.

== Structure and properties ==
At ambient pressure, lutetium(III) sulfide commonly adopts the ε-Lu_{2}S_{3} structure, which is rhombohedral and isostructural with corundum, α-Al_{2}O_{3}. It crystallizes in space group R3̅c (No. 167).

Lu_{2}S_{3} is a high-melting rare-earth sesquisulfide, melting at approximately 1755 °C. It is non-hygroscopic and is stable on exposure to ambient air at room temperature.

Several polymorphs of Lu_{2}S_{3} are known. Under high pressure and high temperature, a cubic γ-phase with the Th_{3}P_{4}-type structure can be obtained. This phase crystallizes in space group I4̅3d.

== Preparation ==
Lutetium(III) sulfide can be prepared by direct reaction of lutetium with sulfur at high temperature under an inert atmosphere:

2 Lu + 3 S → Lu_{2}S_{3}

Single crystals of ε-Lu_{2}S_{3} have also been grown from the melt using the micro-pulling-down method under high-purity argon. Because of the high melting point and sensitivity of the molten material to oxygen, growth is carried out in a closed, inert system.

High-pressure synthesis can be used to obtain the γ-Lu_{2}S_{3} polymorph. Single-phase γ-Lu_{2}S_{3} has been prepared using multi-anvil high-pressure and high-temperature techniques.

== Applications ==
Rare-earth sesquisulfides have been investigated for optical and scintillation applications because of their high refractive indices and broad optical transmission ranges.

Cerium-doped Lu_{2}S_{3} has been studied as a red-emitting scintillator. Lu_{2}S_{3}:Ce^{3+} crystals have been reported to emit between approximately 550 and 700 nm, with a maximum near 592 nm and a decay time of about 32 ns.

More recently, praseodymium-doped Lu_{2}S_{3} single crystals have been investigated for luminescence and scintillation applications. Fast Pr^{3+} 5d→4f emission has been observed under both optical and ionizing-radiation excitation.
