= Neodymium(III) sulfide =

Compound of neodymium and sulfur

Names
- IUPAC names Dineodymium trisulfide
- Other names Neodymium sulfide

Identifiers
CAS Number	12035-32-4
3D model (JSmol)	Interactive image
ChemSpider	145460
ECHA InfoCard	100.031.642
EC Number	234-820-7
PubChem CID	166011
CompTox Dashboard (EPA)	DTXSID2093958
- InChI: InChI=1S/2Nd.3S/q2*+3;3*-2 Key: XZIGKOYGIHSSCQ-UHFFFAOYSA-N
- SMILES: [S-2].[S-2].[S-2].[Nd+3].[Nd+3]

Properties
Chemical formula	Nd_{2}S_{3}
Molar mass	384.66 g·mol^{−1}
- Except where otherwise noted, data are given for materials in their standard state (at 25 °C [77 °F], 100 kPa). Infobox references

Neodymium(III) sulfide is an inorganic chemical compound with the formula Nd_{2}S_{3} composed of a two neodymium atoms in the +3 oxidation state and three sulfur atoms in the −2 oxidation state. Like other rare earth sulfides, neodymium(III) sulfide is used as a high-performance inorganic pigment.

== Preparation ==
Neodymium(III) sulfide can directly be produced by reacting neodymium with sulfur:

2Nd + 3S → Nd_{2}S_{3}

Once prepared, neodymium(III) sulfide can be purified by chemical vapor transport using iodine.

It can also be produced by treating neodymium oxide with hydrogen sulfide at 1450 °C:

Nd_{2}O_{3} + 3 H_{2}S → Nd_{2}S_{3} + 3 H_{2}O

== Properties ==
Neodymium(III) sulfide is (as γ-form) a light green solid. The compound comes in three forms. The α-form has an orthorhombic crystal structure, the β form has a tetragonal crystal structure, and the γ form has a cubic crystal structure. At 1650 °C in a vacuum, the γ compound decomposes to form neodymium monosulfide.

Neodymium(III) sulfide has a high melting point and a lot of polymorphic forms which make it difficult to grow. When heated, neodymium sulfide can lose sulfur atoms and can form a range of compositions between Nd_{2}S_{3} and Nd_{3}S_{4}. Neodymium(III) sulfide is an electrical insulator.

== See also ==
- Neodymium
- Sulfur
- Lanthanide
