= Scandium monosulfide =

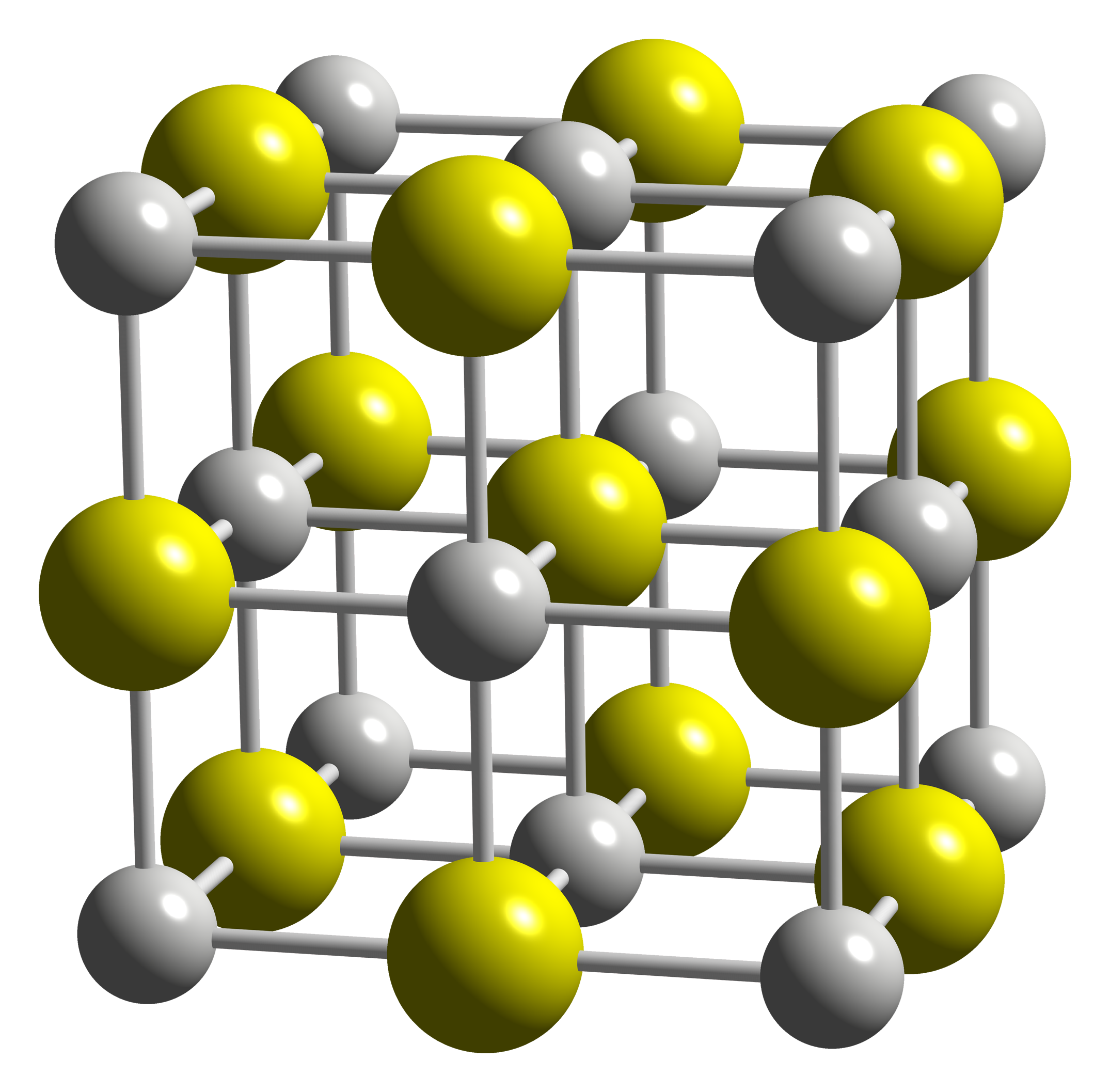
- Scandium monosulfide

Identifiers
CAS Number	12294-10-9
3D model (JSmol)	Interactive image
- InChI: InChI=1S/S.Sc Key: SWQYMBDZKRJOCX-UHFFFAOYSA-N
- SMILES: [Sc].[S]

Properties
Chemical formula	SSc
Molar mass	77.02 g·mol^{−1}
Appearance	gold-coloured solid

Structure
Crystal structure	cubic
- Except where otherwise noted, data are given for materials in their standard state (at 25 °C [77 °F], 100 kPa). verify (what is ?) Infobox references

Scandium monosulfide is a chemical compound of scandium and sulfur with the chemical formula ScS. Although its formula might suggest that it is a compound of scandium(II), i.e. [Sc^{2+}][S^{2−}], ScS is probably more realistically described as a pseudo-ionic compound, containing [Sc^{3+}][S^{2−}], with the remaining electron occupying the conduction band of the solid.

== Structure ==
Scandium monosulfide adopts the sodium chloride crystal structure type.

== Synthesis ==
Scandium monosulfide can be prepared by heating a mixture of scandium metal and powdered sulfur in the absence of air to 1150 °C for 70 hours.

Sc + S → ScS
