= Titanium(III) sulfide =

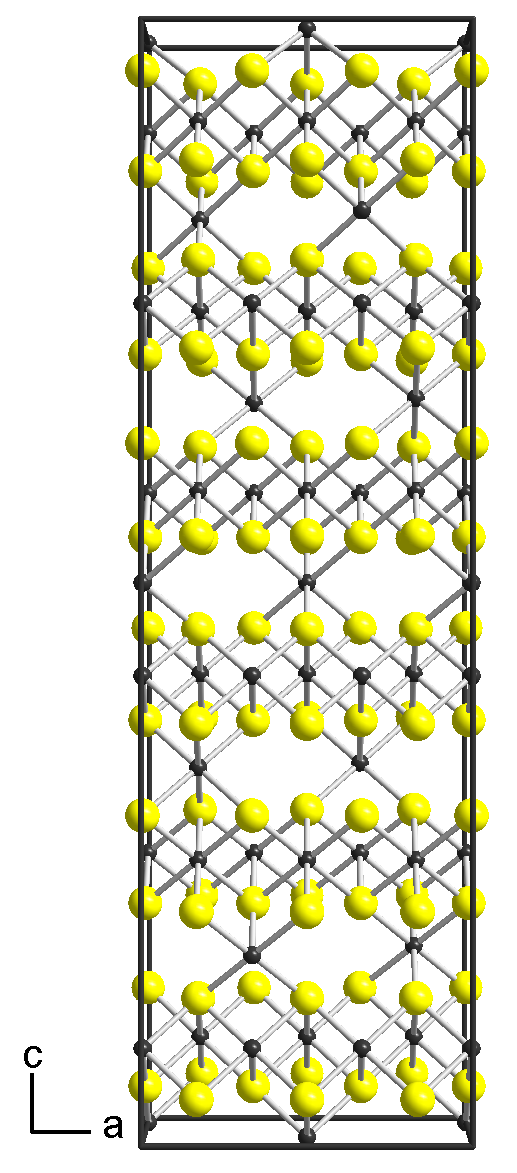

Names
- IUPAC name titanium(3+);trisulfide
- Other names: Dititanium trisulfide; Titanium sesquisulfide

Identifiers
CAS Number	12039-16-6
3D model (JSmol)	Interactive image
PubChem CID	19601280
- InChI: InChI=1S/3S.2Ti/q3*-2;2*+3 Key: JMCREPCAQYAZSN-UHFFFAOYSA-N
- SMILES: [S-2].[S-2].[S-2].[Ti+3].[Ti+3]

Properties
Chemical formula	Ti_{2}S_{3}
Molar mass	191.93
Appearance	black solid
Density	3.684 g/cm^{3}
- Except where otherwise noted, data are given for materials in their standard state (at 25 °C [77 °F], 100 kPa). Infobox references

Titanium(III) sulfide, also called dititanium trisulfide or titanium sesquisulfide, is a chemical compound with the formula Ti_{2}S_{3}.

== Preparation ==
Titanium(III) sulfide is obtained from titanium disulfide, TiS_{2}, by heating at 1000 °C in a vacuum or by reduction with hydrogen at high temperatures. It can also be synthesized by direct combination of the elements under pressure or at 800 °C.

== Properties ==
Titanium(III) sulfide is a black powder that can also be crystalline or shiny. The crystal has the nickel arsenide structure (hexagonal close-packed), with a coordination number of 6 for titanium.

Titanium(III) sulfide is air- and water-stable at normal temperatures and unlike titanium disulfide does not give off an odor of hydrogen sulfide.

In hot sulfuric acid, Ti_{2}S_{3} first forms a blue-gray slurry and then a colorless solution, while in cold concentrated sulfuric or nitric acid it forms a green-colored solution. With hot hydrochloric acid it forms hydrogen sulfide.
