= Avicennite =

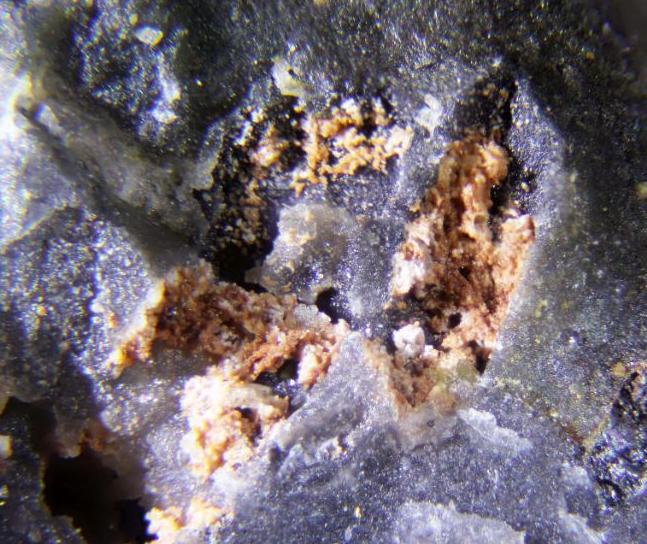

General
- Category: Minerals
- Formula: Tl_{2}O_{3}
- Strunz classification: 4.CB.10
- Dana classification: 04.03.08.01
- Crystal system: Cubic
- Crystal class: Diploidal (m3̅); H-M symbol: (2/m 3̅)
- Space group: Ia3̅

Identification
- Color: Grayish black with brownish black tint
- Mohs scale hardness: 2
- Density: 8.9

Avicennite (thallium(III) oxide) is an oxide mineral. It was discovered around the Dzhuzumli village, Samarqand, Uzbekistan. It is named after Avicenna, a Persian doctor and polymath.

== See also ==
- List of minerals
- List of minerals named after people
