= Scandium oxide =

Scandium(III) oxide
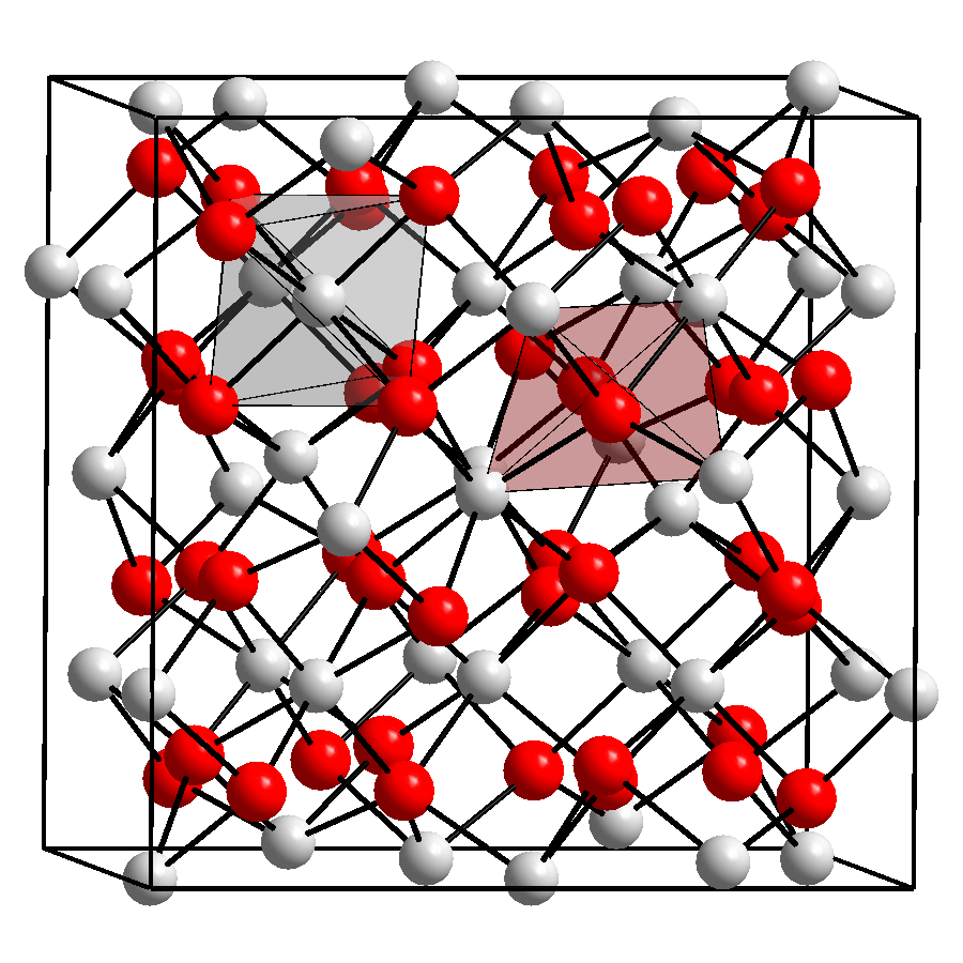
- __ Sc^{3+} __ O^{2−}

Names
- IUPAC name Scandium(III) oxide
- Other names Scandia, scandium sesquioxide

Identifiers
CAS Number	12060-08-1
3D model (JSmol)	Interactive image
ChemSpider	3776136
ECHA InfoCard	100.031.844
EC Number	235-042-0
PubChem CID	4583683
UNII	T0G94L07ZD
CompTox Dashboard (EPA)	DTXSID1051224
- InChI: InChI=1S/3O.2Sc
- SMILES: O=[Sc]O[Sc]=O

Properties
Chemical formula	Sc_{2}O_{3}
Molar mass	137.910 g/mol
Appearance	White powder
Density	3.86 g/cm^{3}
Melting point	2,485 °C (4,505 °F; 2,758 K)
Solubility in water	insoluble in water
Solubility	soluble in hot acids (reacts)

Structure
Crystal structure	Bixbyite
Space group	Ia3̅ (No. 206)
Lattice constant	a = 985 pm

Hazards
NFPA 704 (fire diamond)	1 0 0

Related compounds
Other anions	Scandium(III) sulfide
Other cations	Yttrium(III) oxide Lutetium(III) oxide
- Except where otherwise noted, data are given for materials in their standard state (at 25 °C [77 °F], 100 kPa). verify (what is ?) Infobox references

Scandium(III) oxide or scandia is an inorganic compound with formula Sc_{2}O_{3}. It is one of several oxides of rare earth elements with a high melting point. It is used in the preparation of other scandium compounds as well as in high-temperature systems (for its resistance to heat and thermal shock), electronic ceramics, and glass composition (as a helper material).

== Structure and physical properties ==
Scandium(III) oxide adopts a cubic crystal structure (point group: tetrahedral (T_{h}), space group: Ia3̅) containing 6-coordinate metal centres. Powder diffraction analysis shows Sc−O bond distances of 2.159–2.071 Å.

Scandium oxide is an insulator with a band gap of 6.0 eV.

== Production ==
Scandium oxide is the primary form of refined scandium produced by the mining industry. Scandium-rich ores, such as thortveitite (Sc,Y)_{2}(Si_{2}O_{7}) and kolbeckite ScPO_{4}·2H_{2}O are rare, however trace amounts of scandium are present in many other minerals. Scandium oxide is therefore predominantly produced as a by-product from the extraction of other elements.

== Reactions ==
Scandium oxide is the primary form of refined scandium produced by the mining industry, making it the start point for all scandium chemistry.

Scandium oxide reacts with most acids upon heating, to produce the expected hydrated product. For example, heating in excess aqueous HCl produces hydrated ScCl_{3}·nH_{2}O. This can be rendered anhydrous by evaporation to dryness in the presence of NH_{4}Cl, with the mixture then being purified by removal of NH_{4}Cl by sublimation at 300-500 °C. The presence of NH_{4}Cl is required, as the hydrated ScCl_{3}·nH_{2}O would otherwise form a mixed oxychloride upon drying.

Sc_{2}O_{3} + 6 HCl + x H_{2}O → 2 ScCl_{3}·nH_{2}O + 3 H_{2}O
ScCl_{3}·nH_{2}O + n NH_{4}Cl → ScCl_{3} + n H_{2}O + n NH_{4}Cl

Likewise, it is converted into hydrated scandium(III) triflate (Sc(OTf)_{3}·nH_{2}O) by a reaction with triflic acid.

Metallic scandium is produced industrially by the reduction of scandium oxide; this proceeds via conversion to scandium fluoride followed by a reduction with metallic calcium. This process is in some ways similar to the Kroll process for the production of metallic titanium.

Scandium oxide forms scandate salts with alkalis, unlike its higher homologues yttrium oxide and lanthanum oxide (but like lutetium oxide), for example forming K_{3}Sc(OH)_{6} with KOH. In this, scandium oxide shows more similarity with aluminium oxide.

== Natural occurrence ==
Natural scandia, although impure, occurs as mineral kangite.
