= Chemical transport reaction =

Process for purification and crystallization of non-volatile solids

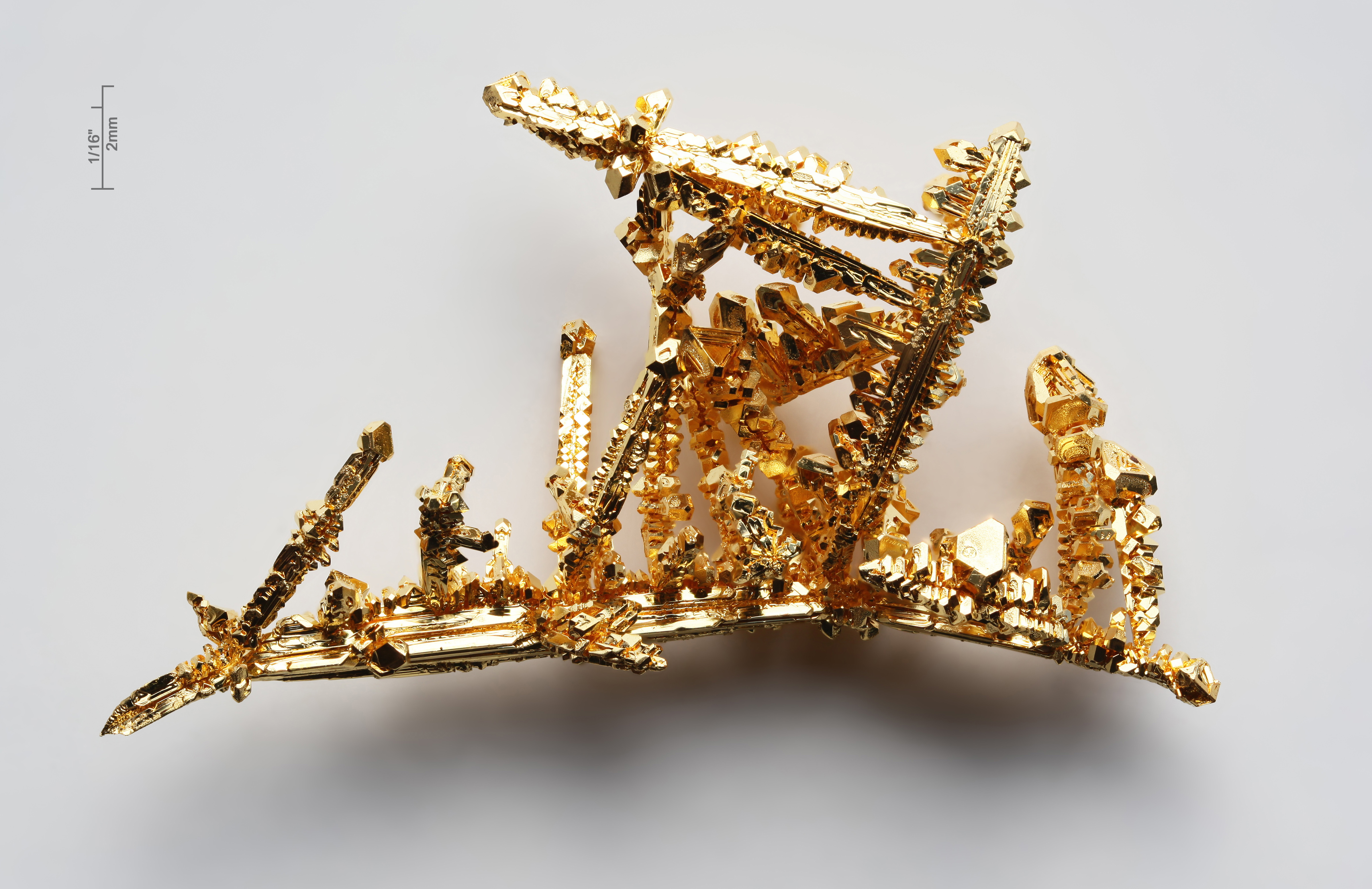
Gold crystals grown by chemical transport using chlorine as the transport agent.

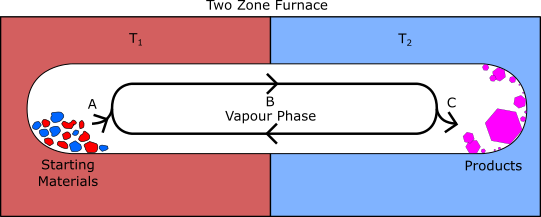
Schematic diagram of the CVT process. Point A is the reaction between the starting materials and the transport agent to form volatile intermediates. These intermediates then are free to move around the inside of the tube via diffusion or convection (point B), and when they reach point C some of the gaseous species react to form solid products.

In chemistry, a chemical transport reaction (also called chemical vapor transport) describes a process for purification and crystallization of non-volatile solids. The process is also responsible for certain aspects of mineral growth from the effluent of volcanoes. The technique is distinct from chemical vapor deposition, which usually entails decomposition of molecular precursors (e.g. SiH_{4} → Si + 2 H_{2}) and which gives conformal coatings. The technique, which was popularized by Harald Schäfer, involves the reversible conversion of nonvolatile elements and chemical compounds into volatile derivatives through sublimation typically assisted by a transport agent. Transport of the gaseous species is then driven by a temperature gradient which is typically held across a phase boundary of the crystalline material being grown. When the gaseous species transfer over to the colder zone of the furnace it is no longer thermodynamically favorable for them to remain gaseous and they condense into solid crystal. This process is typically carried out in a sealed and evacuated quartz ampoule heated in a multi zone tube furnace. The transport agent is thus catalytic. The method derives from the Van Arkel de Boer process which was used for the purification of titanium and vanadium and uses iodine as the transport agent. Typical transport agents include halogens like Iodine, Chlorine, Bromine, etc. and halogen containing compounds like Tellurium Bromide.

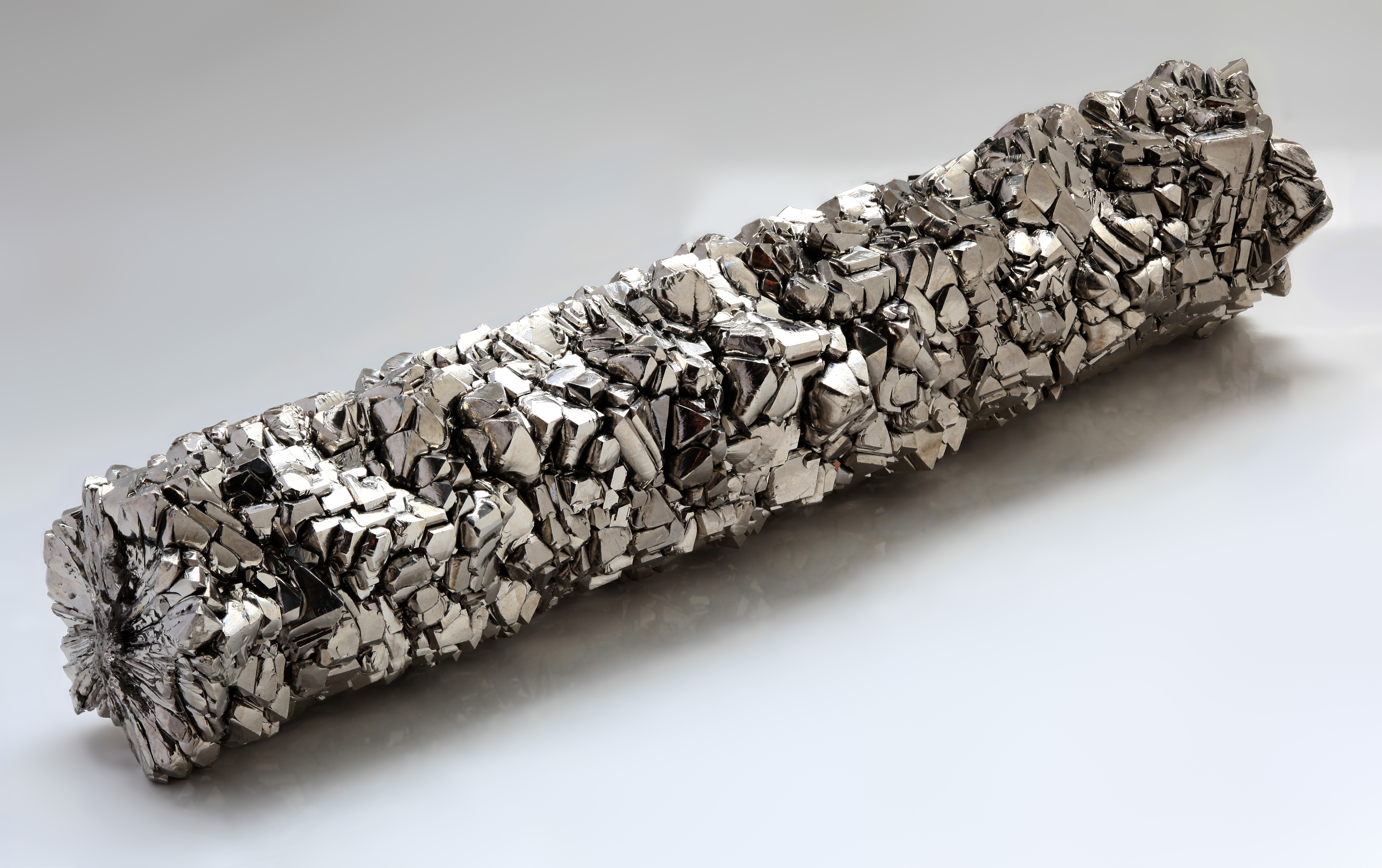
Crystals of titanium grown using the Van Arkel-de Boer process with I_{2} as the transport agent.

== Cases of the exothermic and endothermic reactions of the transporting agent ==
Transport reactions are classified according to the thermodynamics of the reaction between the solid and the transporting agent. When the reaction is exothermic, then the solid of interest is transported from the cooler end (which can be quite hot) of the reactor to a hot end, where the equilibrium constant is less favorable and the crystals grow. The reaction of molybdenum dioxide with the transporting agent iodine is an exothermic process, thus the MoO_{2} migrates from the cooler end (700 °C) to the hotter end (900 °C):

MoO_{2} + I_{2} ⇌ MoO_{2}I_{2} ΔH_{rxn} < 0 (exothermic)

Using 10 milligrams of iodine for 4 grams of the solid, the process requires several days.

Alternatively, when the reaction of the solid and the transport agent is endothermic, the solid is transported from a hot zone to a cooler one. For example:

Fe_{2}O_{3} + 6 HCl ⇌ Fe_{2}Cl_{6}+ 3 H_{2}O ΔH_{rxn} > 0 (endothermic)

The sample of iron(III) oxide is maintained at 1000 °C, and the product is grown at 750 °C. HCl is the transport agent. Crystals of hematite are reportedly observed at the mouths of volcanoes because of chemical transport reactions whereby volcanic hydrogen chloride volatilizes iron(III) oxides.

== Halogen lamp ==
A similar reaction like that of MoO_{2} is used in halogen lamps. The tungsten is evaporated from the tungsten filament and converted with traces of oxygen and iodine into the WO_{2}I_{2}, at the high temperatures near the filament the compound decomposes back to tungsten, oxygen and iodine.

WO_{2} + I_{2} ⇌ WO_{2}I_{2}, ΔH_{rxn} < 0 (exothermic)
