= Manono-Kitolo mine =

Mine in Tanganyika Province, DRC

Manono-Kitotolo mine
- Location within Democratic Republic of the Congo
- Location: Tanganyika Province, Democratic Republic of the Congo; 7.296°S 27.426°E
- Products: Tin; Tantalum; Niobium; Lithium
- Opened: 1915
- Closed: 1982

The Manono-Kitotolo mine is a former tin and coltan mine, which also contains one of the largest lithium reserves globally, in the Democratic Republic of the Congo. The mine is located in southern Democratic Republic of the Congo in Tanganyika Province. The Manono-Kitotolo mine has reserves amounting to 120 million tonnes of lithium ore grading 0.6% lithium thus resulting 0.72 million tonnes of lithium.

== History ==
=== Original mine ===
The mine was run by Géomines from 1915 to the mid-1980s, producing 140,000 tons of cassiterite (tin) and 10,000 tons of columbite-tantalite (coltan). Since the mine's closure, companies have focused on the large lithium reserves at the site.

=== Lithium project ===
In 2018 studies reported a significant high-grade lithium deposit, estimated to have the potential of 1.5 billion tons of lithium spodumene hard rock situated in Manono in central DRC. AVZ Minerals, an Australian company, initially claimed to hold a 75% stake in a joint venture with the Congolaise d'Exploitation Minière (25%), a State-owned enterprise.

In 2021, AVZ agreed to sell a 24% stake in the venture to the Chinese battery manufacturer CATL for $240 million.

=== Ownership dispute ===
Ownership of the Manono-Kitotolo lithium project has become contested. In 2021, Chinese miner Zijin Mining lawfully acquired a 15% stake in Dathcom Mining SA, the project's holding company, from Cominière. AVZ Minerals challenged this sale, initiating legal action which was repeatedly rejected by Congolese courts. In February 2023, the Democratic Republic of the Congo's Ministry of Mines revoked AVZ Minerals' mining permit for the Manono project, citing delays in project development. Subsequently, the rights were awarded to Manono Lithium SAS, a joint venture between Zijin Mining (61%) and state-owned Cominière (39%). One of the main elements of the new mine plan is to refurbish the nearby Mpiana-Mwanga hydropower station to supply energy for mining operations.

=== Manono tailings project ===
As of 2022, Canada-based Tantalex Resources Corporation was seeking to raise funds to reprocess tailings from the historical Manono mine.

=== KoBold Metals ===
On 13 April 2026, U.S. mining firm KoBold Metals announced the launch of an artificial intelligence–driven lithium exploration campaign in the Democratic Republic of the Congo, with plans to invest over $50 million by early 2027. The company stated that it has already paid more than one-third of this amount to secure 13 exploration permits in the country's southeast, with the initiative initially targeting lithium deposits in Manono, where KoBold aims to develop a mine, before expanding to other regions in the country. Meanwhile, KoBold and the Congolese government have been in a dispute with the Royal Museum for Central Africa in Brussels over access to a large archive of geological data that could support the project. An earlier agreement signed in mid-2025 enabled KoBold's entry into the DRC's mining sector and included commitments to digitize the museum's geological records, map mineral resources, and make historical geoscientific data freely accessible through the DRC's National Geological Service.

== See also ==
- Manono, Democratic Republic of the Congo
