= Ixiolite =

Accessory oxide mineral found in granitic pegmatites

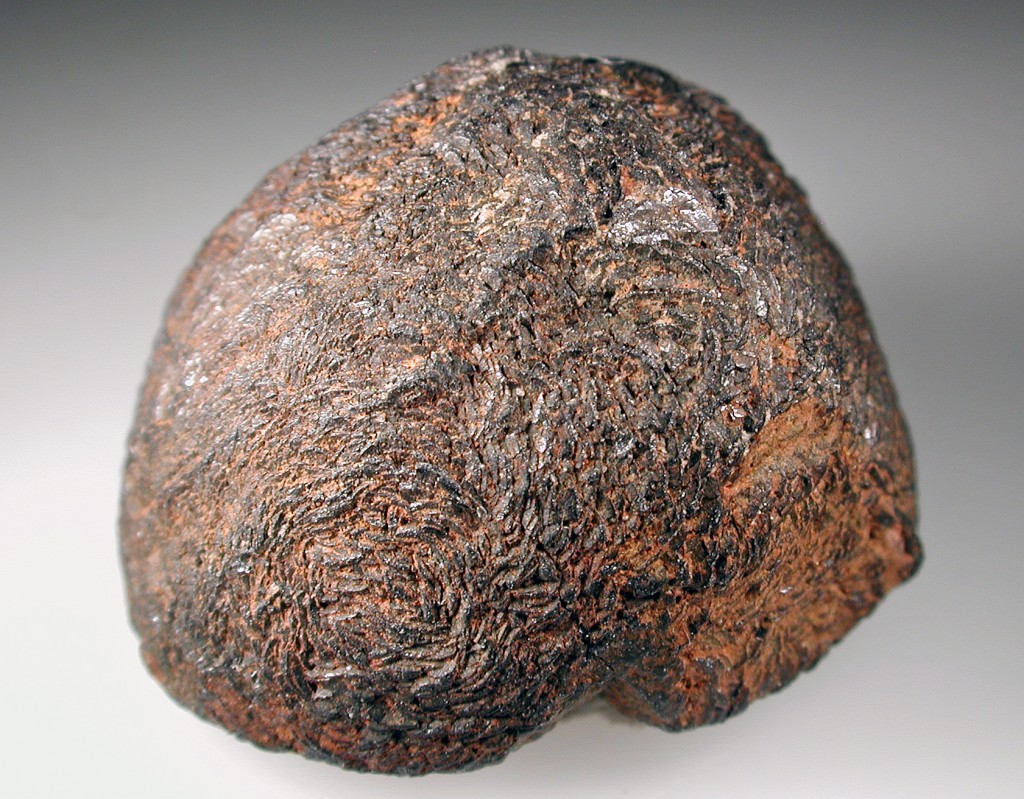
- Ixiolite found in Mozambique

General
- Category: Oxide minerals
- Formula: (Ta,Nb,Sn,Mn,Fe)_{4}O_{8} or (Ta,Mn,Nb)O_{2}
- IMA symbol: Ix
- Strunz classification: 4.DB.25
- Crystal system: Orthorhombic, some varieties might be monoclinic
- Crystal class: Dipyramidal (mmm); H-M symbol: (2/m 2/m 2/m)
- Space group: Pbcn
- Unit cell: a = 4.785, b = 5.758 c = 5.16 [Å]; Z = 4

Identification
- Color: Steel-grey, black
- Crystal habit: Irregular granular or inclusions, also as prismatic crystals; some varieties might be pseudoorthorhombic
- Twinning: Uncommon on {013}
- Fracture: Irregular/ uneven, sub-conchoidal
- Tenacity: Brittle
- Mohs scale hardness: 6 - 6 1/2
- Luster: Sub-metallic
- Diaphaneity: Opaque
- Specific gravity: 7.03 - 7.23

Ixiolite is an accessory oxide mineral found in granitic pegmatites. It is an oxide with the general chemical formula (Ta,Nb,Sn,Mn,Fe)_{4}O_{8} or (Ta,Mn,Nb)O_{2}.

== Structure ==
Ixiolite was originally reported as crystallizing in the monoclinic crystal system. Detailed studies of the scandium, tin and titanium rich varieties indicate that they form crystals in the orthorhombic system whereas tungsten ixiolite is monoclinic.

== Discovery and occurrence ==
It was first described in 1857 for an occurrence at Skogsböle, Kimito Island, Finland. The name is for Ixion, the Greek mythological character related to Tantalus, as the mineral contains tantalum.

Ixiolite is typically associated with feldspar, tapiolite, cassiterite, microlite, and rutile.

== Substitution and varieties ==
Trace elements include zirconium, hafnium, titanium and tungsten.

As with other tantalum and niobium bearing minerals considerable substitution and a number of varieties exist. Substitutions in the formula are common and the varieties stannian ixiolite (tin), titanian ixiolite (titanium) and wolframian ixiolite (tungsten) have been reported.

Scandium is present in many ixiolite sample with percentages up to 4.0 percent Sc_{2}O_{3}, but usually less than one percent scandium oxide. High scandium ixiolites, containing from 4 to 19% scandium oxide are typically also rich in tin and titanium.

== Economic importance ==
Ixiolite together with microlite, tantalite, tapiolite, wodginite are the most important minerals mined for the element tantalum. Ixiolite contains about 69 % tantalum oxide (Ta_{2}O_{5}) and is a common constituent of coltan ore.
