= Wodginite =

Mineral

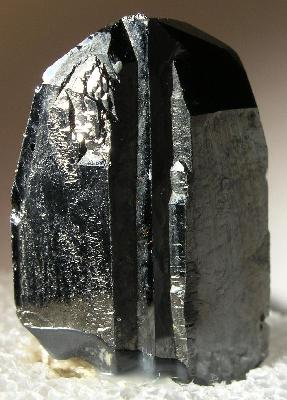
- Wodginite over cassiterite

General
- Category: Oxide - Tantalate mineral
- Formula: Mn^{2+}(Sn,Ta)Ta_{2}O_{8}
- IMA symbol: Wdg
- Strunz classification: 4.DB.40
- Dana classification: 08.01.08.01
- Crystal system: Monoclinic
- Crystal class: Prismatic (2/m) (same H-M symbol)
- Space group: C2/c (no. 15)

Identification
- Color: Reddish brown, dark brown to black
- Crystal habit: Flattened dipyramidal to prismatic crystals in radiating groups; granular, massive.
- Twinning: Very common as penetration twins
- Cleavage: none
- Fracture: Irregular
- Tenacity: Brittle
- Mohs scale hardness: 5.5
- Luster: Sub-metallic
- Streak: Brown
- Diaphaneity: Opaque, translucent in thin fragments
- Specific gravity: 7.19–7.36

Wodginite is a manganese, tin, tantalum oxide mineral with the chemical formula Mn^{2+}(Sn,Ta)Ta_{2}O_{8}. It may also include significant amounts of niobium.

== Background ==
Wodginite was first described in 1963 for an occurrence in the Wodgina pegmatite, Wodgina, Pilbara Region, Western Australia.

Typical occurrence of wodginite occurs in zoned pegmatites in amphibolite. It is associated with tantalite, albite, quartz, muscovite, tapiolite, microlite and microcline.

It occurs in pegmatites in a wide variety of locations. The most studied is the Tanco pegmatite in Manitoba, Canada; also in Red Lake, Ontario. It is reported from the Strickland quarry, Portland, Middlesex County, Connecticut; the Herbb #2 pegmatite, Powhatan County, Virginia; the McAllister mine, Rockford, Coosa County, Alabama; the Peerless mine, Pennington County, South Dakota. Also from Paraíba and Minas Gerais, Brazil; Krasonice, Czech Republic; Orivesi, Finland; Kalba, eastern Kazakhstan; Ankole, Uganda; Miami district, Zimbabwe and Karibib and Kohero, Namibia.

The figure shows, that the columbite group (including tantalite) and wodginite can be seen as a superstructure of ixiolite.
