= Manono, Democratic Republic of the Congo =

Town in Tanganyika, Democratic Republic of the Congo

Manono
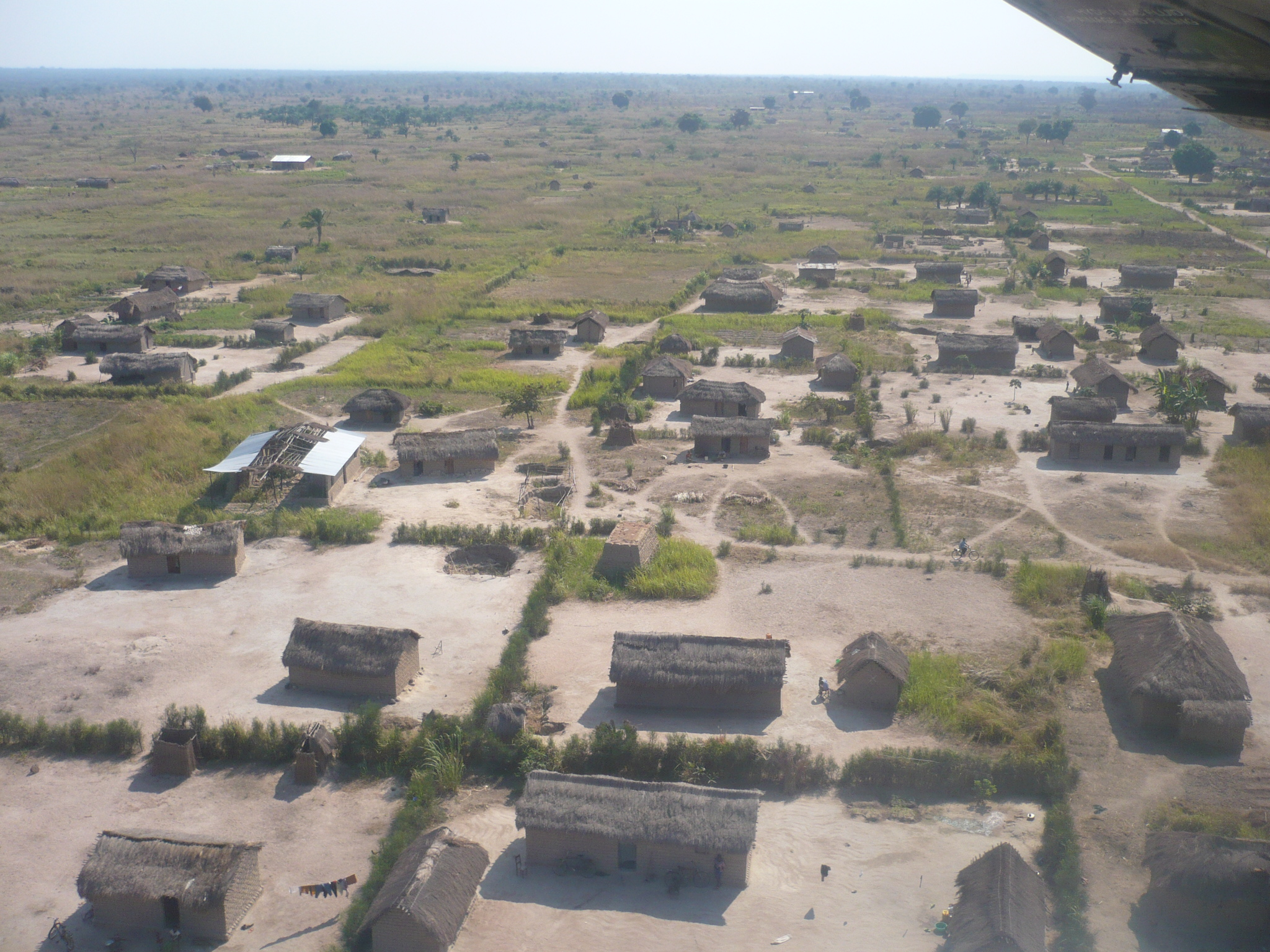
- Manono from the air

- Location within Democratic Republic of the Congo
- Coordinates: 7.294704°S 27.454491°E
- Country: Democratic Republic of the Congo
- Province: Tanganyika
- Territory: Manono
- Climate: Aw
- National language: Swahili

Manono is a town and territory in Tanganyika Province, Democratic Republic of the Congo.

== History ==
Manono was seriously affected by the Second Congo War (1998-2003), with many buildings destroyed. Rally for Congolese Democracy rebels and allied Rwandan soldiers took control of Manono in 1999. The town used to have a brewery, and a hydro-electric power plant used to provide electricity to the surrounding region; both were destroyed during the war. The power plant was flooded and destroyed for fear of it falling into the hands of Mai-Mai, a local rebel group. The six turbines were completely ruined, and every dial, solenoid, switch, and transformer was destroyed.

The UN carried out arms decommissioning in 2008, offering to accept guns in exchange for a bicycle. The scheme was successful in removing weapons. Manono later became affected by the Katanga insurgency; by 2014/15, Gédéon Kyungu Mutanga, the leader of the Mai Mai Kata Katanga rebel group, operated in the area before relocating. Elements of his group continued to hold out in Manono Territory. In November 2021, three commanders and 169 Mai Mai Bakata Katanga militants surrendered to the government in Manono's Mpyana sector.

== Location, economy, and culture ==
Manono lies on the western bank of the Lukushi River, a tributary of the Luvua River. The town is a river port, with barges bringing cargo from Lubumbashi. Manono is also connected to a disused railway line to Muyumba. The town lies along National Road 33 (N33) and Regional Road 628 (R628).

Economic activity is centered on mining, with the surrounding area containing approximately 100 million tonnes of minerals, including spodumene (lithium), columbite, tin and tantalite. Mining by Géomines began in 1915. The Manono-Kitolo mine was worked almost continuously until the late 1970s, first by Géomines and later by Congo-Etain and Zairetain. Perhaps 180,000 tonnes of cassiterite ore were extracted in this period.

The collapse of the world tin price in the 1980s severely hit the town's economy. However, since 2017 exploration has been underway for lithium minerals and tin at the historical tin mine in the Manono - Kitotolo region, with over $100 million spent by Australian mining company AVZ Minerals to assist the development of the mine and broader region.

The town is served by Manono Airport. Manono has a cathedral which was built by Belgian missionaries, and was severely damaged during the war. An aid worker described a visit as follows: "The large Catholic church was hit by numerous shells during the DRC's civil war, which officially ended in 2003 . . . .. It is quite an experience to sit inside listening to choirs of African children singing angelically, while above twisted beams of metal and reinforced concrete create gaping holes to the brilliant blue sky."

== Climate ==
Manono has a tropical savanna climate (Köppen: Aw).

Climate data for Manono
Month	Jan	Feb	Mar	Apr	May	Jun	Jul	Aug	Sep	Oct	Nov	Dec	Year
Daily mean °C (°F)	25.0 (77.0)	25.2 (77.4)	25.7 (78.3)	25.8 (78.4)	25.4 (77.7)	24.2 (75.6)	24.4 (75.9)	25.5 (77.9)	26.5 (79.7)	26.1 (79.0)	25.2 (77.4)	24.8 (76.6)	25.3 (77.5)
Average precipitation mm (inches)	172 (6.8)	146 (5.7)	199 (7.8)	122 (4.8)	17 (0.7)	2 (0.1)	0 (0)	6 (0.2)	44 (1.7)	90 (3.5)	161 (6.3)	181 (7.1)	1,140 (44.7)
Source: Climate-Data.org
