= Mulumba =

Mulumba is a given name and a surname. Notable people with the name include:

Given name:

- Gérard Mulumba Kalemba (1937–2020), Congolese prelate of the Catholic Church
- Mulumba Lukoji (1943–1997), Congolese politician
- Mulumba Mukendi (born 1985), football striker from DR Congo

Surname:

- Andy Mulumba (born 1990), Congolese-Canadian professional American football linebacker
- Daniel Mulumba (1962–2012), the first Ugandan swimmer to compete at the Olympic Games
- Fiston Mbaya Mulumba (born 1996), Congolese boxer
- Ivan Matthias Mulumba, Ugandan writer and valuation surveyor
- Kabongo Mulumba, Democratic Republic of the Congo karateka
- Mabi Mulumba (born 1941), Congolese former politician
- Matiya Mulumba (1836–1886), Ugandan Roman Catholic, one of the Martyrs of Uganda
- Rémi Mulumba (born 1992), professional footballer
- Tryphon Kin-Kiey Mulumba (born 1949), Congolese politician
- Christophe Mulumba-Tshimanga (born 1993), professional Canadian football linebacker

== See also ==
- Knights of Saint Mulumba, founded in Nigeria in 1953, currently has over 10772 members
- St. Matthias Mulumba Tindinyo Seminary, Kenya's National Theologicum Seminary for training Catholic clergy
- Malamba
- Malambo (disambiguation)
- Malembo
- Malimba (disambiguation)
- Malimbe
- Malombo
- Mulamba
