= Cominière =

Former Belgian holding company active in the Belgian Congo

Société commerciale et Minière du Congo
- Trade name: Cominière
- Type: Diverse industries
- Founded: 1910
- Defunct: 1971
- Area served: Belgian Congo / Democratic Republic of the Congo

Cominière (Société commerciale et Minière du Congo) was a Belgian holding company active in the Belgian Congo. It was involved in plantations, forestry, mining, railways and other activities. The Congo assets were nationalized when the Democratic Republic of the Congo became independent in 1960. What remained of Cominière was acquired by Lonhro in 1971. A new, unrelated company with the same name was created in the Democratic Republic of the Congo in 2010 to mine minerals such as tin and colombo-tantalite.

== Belgian Congo ==
Cominière (Société commerciale et minière du Congo) was incorporated in 1910 by Belgian financiers. In the Belgian Congo the company engaged in cotton, coffee, rubber, rice and cocoa plantations, forestry, construction, railways and energy. The Belgian limited company Société Commerciale et Minière de l'Uélé (Comuele) was created in June 1919 as a joint venture between the Cominière and the English Lever Brothers. In 1926 it established the Ekwangatana coffee plantations. The Cominière subsidiary Agrifor (Société Forestière et Agricole du Mayumbe) was founded in 1924 to produce forest and agriculture products in the Mayombe region.

Cominière was one of the four largest Belgian companies that invested in mining and railways in the Congo, the others being the Société Générale de Belgique, Empain and Banque de Bruxelles. In 1920 the transition by Géomines to a full-scale operating company required 12 million francs of additional capital. Comité Spécial du Katanga (CSK) provided 30% and Cominière provided 22.5%. Cominière revived the old project of a railway to the Buta, Nepoko and Haut-Uélé regions in 1922 and obtained the concession in 1923. Cominière founded the Société des Chemins de Fer Vicinaux du Congo (Vicicongo) in 1924. It was founded under an agreement of 1923 that was modified several times afterwards. The colonial government held the majority of shares, and the Minister of Colonies named the president and managing director.

In the 1930s a subsidiary of Cominière built a railway from Bogotá to Sogamoso in Colombia. The costs were far higher than expected. Martin Theves, future president of Agrifor, was sent to Colombia in 1935 to solve the problem, and managed to sell the railway to the government for a good price.

== Subsidiaries ==
The members of the Cominière group have included:

- Agrifor (Société Forestière et Agricole du Mayumbe), forest and agriculture products of Mayombe, founded in 1924
- Socol (Société Continentale et Coloniale de Construction), providing engineering and construction services in the Congo, Belgium and other countries.
- Colectric (Société Coloniale d'Electricité), electric power distribution in the Léopoldville area
- Vicicongo (Société des Chemins de Fer Vicinaux du Congo), narrow-gauge railway in the northeast and road haulage
- Comuele (Société Commerciale et Minière de l'Uélé), coffee, rubber and palm oil in the Uélé and Ubangi regions of Congo
- TCL (Société des Transports en Commun de Leopoldville), public transport in Léopoldville
- Immoaf (Société Immobilière et Hypothécaire Africaine), insurance and travel services.

== Post-independence ==
In 1960 Cominière's main African subsidiaries were nationalized, and the company redeployed to Belgium. In 1965 the Cominière group was owned only by private investors, most of whom were Belgian. The diversified Lonhro group of Britain acquired a majority stake in 1971. Between 1989 and 1991 Cominière raised fresh equity capital, sold some assets and liquidated others, but retained its investments in Matermaco and Verswijver in Belgium, and in Afrima and Immoaf in Zaire. Lonrho owned 82% of the shares of Cominière.

== Congolaise d'Exploitation Minière ==
A new company named La Congolaise d'Exploitation Minière (Cominière (Note: Although there is no direct relationship between the new Cominière and the former Belgian company, both were involved in the massive tin mine in Manono.)) was created in the Democratic Republic of the Congo on 12 April 2010. The purpose was to survey, prospect, research, mine, refine and export minerals such as tin and colombo-tantalite. Cominiere was owned 90% by the DRC government and 10% by L’Institut National de Sécurité Sociale du Congo, a large social security and pension fund.

In September 2013 Cominière and MMCS of Mauritius started Manono Minerals a joint venture to exploit the Manono and Kitolo deposits in Katanga. MMCS held a 68% share. In 2016 the Ministry of Mines revoked the Manono Minerals mining permit and issued a permit for mining the same area to a joint venture between AVZ Minerals of Australia. MMCS disputed the legality of the change. In 2016 the Canadian mining company Tantalex announced a joint venture with Cominiere to develop deposits of Lithium-Cesium-Tantalum (LCT) Pegmatites adjacent to the Manono-Kitotolo mine, formerly owned by Géomines.

== Sources ==
- Boahen, A. Adu (1985-01-01), Africa Under Colonial Domination 1880-1935, UNESCO, ISBN 978-92-3-101713-1
- Buckell Lithium Exploration Project, Tantalex, 22 September 2016
- Charlet, Marc (26 July 1991), "Entreprise sur le gril: Fiche Technique : La Cominiere", Le Soir.be
- "cominière sa", CIGA sarl
- "Dispute over DRC-based lithium licences goes to court", Mining Review Africa, 9 March 2017
- Ergo, André-Bernard, La COMUELE (PDF)
- Geiger, Theodore (1965), The Agrifor and U.S. Plywood in the Congo, Business Performance Abroad, National Planning Association
- Hillman, John (1997), "Chartered Companies and the Development of the Tin Industry in Belgian Africa, 1900-1939", African Economic History (25), University of Wisconsin Press: 149–173, doi:10.2307/3601883
- Omasombo Tshonda, Jean (2014), Bas-Uele Pouvoirs locaux et économie agricole : héritages d’un passé brouillé (PDF) (in French), Musée royal de l’Afrique centrale, ISBN 978-9-4916-1586-3
- The Congo's Economy: Evolution And Prospects Democratic Republic Of The Congo (PDF), vol. III Transport, International Bank For Reconstruction And Development, 8 December 1970
- Yernault, Dimitri (2013-08-07), L'État et la propriété: Permanences et mutations du droit public économique en Belgique de 1830 à 2011, Bruylant, ISBN 978-2-8027-4060-5
