= Augustine Mugambo =

Ugandan Catholic religious brother

- Born: 24 February 1974 (age 52); Rakai, Uganda
- Citizenship: Uganda
- Education: St. John's Secondary School; Kyambogo University (Bachelor of Arts in Education); Walsh University (Master's in Education)
- Occupations: religious brother and educator
- Years active: 1992–present
- Title: Catholic religious brother

Augustine Mugambo also known as Brother Augustine Mugambo (24 February 1974) is a Ugandan Catholic religious brother, educator, and school administrator.

== Early life and education background ==
Mugambo was born on 24 February 1974 in Kabuwoko, Rakai District. He attended Bishop Ddungu Primary School, St. John’s Secondary School for his O-Level, and St. Charles Lwanga Kasasa for his A-Level. Mugambo earned a Bachelor of Arts in Education from Kyambogo University in 2005 and a Master’s in Education from Walsh University, USA, in 2010.

== Career ==
Mugambo taught at St. Cecilia Girls Primary School, Villa Maria, in 1992, and at Ibanda Secondary School from 1998 to 2000. He also taught at St. Edward’s Bukuumi and St. Leo’s Kyegobe in Fort Portal District. Later, Mugambo was appointed Deputy Headteacher of St. Henry’s College Kitovu in 2005 and from 2011 to 2024, he served as the Headteacher of St. Henry’s College Kitovu.

== Religious life ==
Mugambo joined the Brothers of Christian Instruction in 1994 after undergoing four years of religious formation at Mount St. Theresa Kisubi.

== See also ==
St. Henry’s College Kitovu
