= MNO (disambiguation) =

MNO is an abbreviation for mobile network operator. It may also refer to

- Manganese oxide (MnO)
- Métis Nation of Ontario in Canada
- Ministry of Defence in some Slavic-speaking countries:
  - Ministry of Defence (Czechoslovakia)
  - Ministry of Defence of the Slovak State
- Multinational organization
- Manono Airport (IATA airport code MNO) in Manono, Democratic Republic of the Congo
- Master of Nonprofit Organizations, a graduate-level degree
