= Musinguzi Yona =

Ugandan politician

Hon. Yona Musinguzi
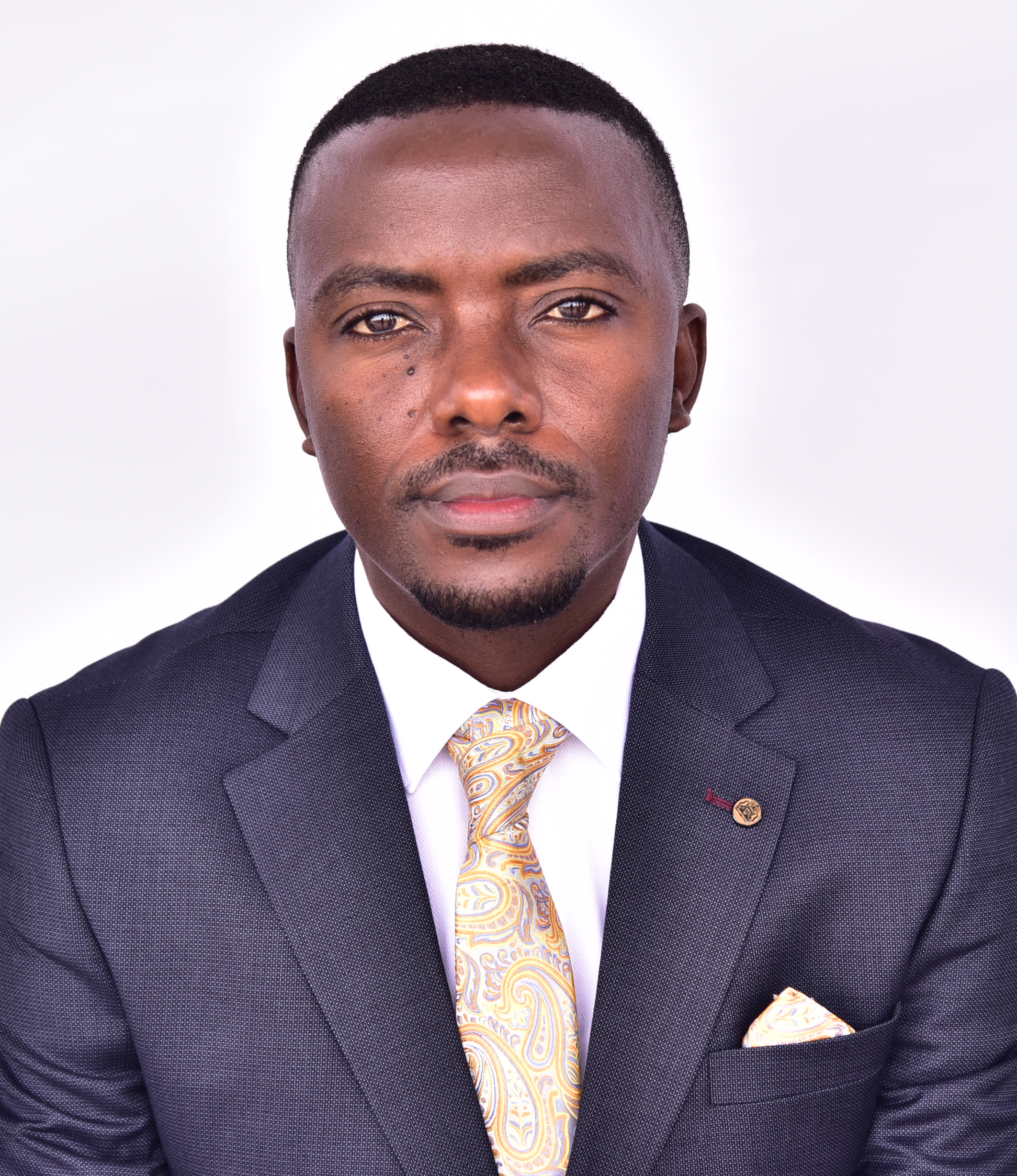

Member of Parliament for Ntungamo Municipality
- In office 2021–2026
- Preceded by: Gerald Karuhanga
- Succeeded by: Gerald Karuhanga

Member of Parliament for Ntungamo Municipality
- In office 2011–2016
- Succeeded by: Gerald Karuhanga

Personal details
- Born: March 1, 1982 (age 44) Ntungamo District, Uganda
- Citizenship: Ugandan
- Party: National Resistance Movement
- Parent(s): Joseph Bikwasizehi (father); Mary Bikwasizehi (mother)
- Education: Kitabi Seminary; St. Henry's College Kitovu; Nakawa Business School; Kyambogo University
- Occupation: Businessman, politician
- Committees: Committee on Legal and Parliamentary Affairs; Public Accounts Committee; Committee on Science, Technology and Innovation

Musinguzi Yona (born 1 March 1982) is a Ugandan businessman and politician who served as a Member of Parliament for Ntungamo Municipality in the 9th and 11th Parliament of Uganda.

== Early life and education background ==
Musinguzi was born on 1 March 1982 to Mr. Joseph Bikwatsizehi and Mrs. Mary Bikwatsizehi who are residents of Nyakibigyi village in Ntungamo district. He studied from Kitabi Seminary in Bushenyi district for his O'level and St. Henry's College Kitovu for his A'level on government sponsorship in 2001.

In 2006, he obtained a bachelor's degree of commerce from Nakawa Business school before he joined Kyambogo University where he obtained a bachelor's degree in food technology in 2009 and later attained a Master of Science (MSc) in Food Technology from the University of Genk in Belgium.

== Career ==
Musinguzi began his public service career as a Councillor representing Nakawa Division on Kampala City Council (KCC), serving from 2006 to 2011. During this period, he also served as a member of the Kyambogo University Council from 2008 to 2009 and as UN-Habitat East Africa Coordinator from 2009 to 2011.

In 2011 general election, he was elected to represent Ntungamo Municipality in the 11th Parliament (2011 to 2016) and during this term of office, he served on the Committee on Legal and Parliamentary Affairs and the Public Accounts Committee.

In the 2016 general elections, he lost the Ntungamo Municipality parliamentary seat to Gerald Karuhanga, who won the election as an independent candidate.

Musinguzi later made a political comeback in the 2021 general elections, when he defeated the incumbent Karuhanga and was re-elected as the Member of Parliament for Ntungamo Municipality in the 11th Parliament (2021–2026). In the 2026 general elections, Musinguzi lost the seat again to Karuhanga, who returned to Parliament after defeating the incumbent.

== See also ==
- List of members of the eleventh parliament
- Mugisha Muntu
- Beatrice Rwakimari
