= AVZ =

AVZ may refer to:

- Aachener Volkszeitung
- Austral Volcanic Zone
- AVZ Minerals, Australian mining company, primarily dealing with the Manono-Kitolo lithium mine
- AVZ, ICAO code of the defunct Kazakhstani airline Aeroservice Kazakhstan
- AVZ, ICAO code of Air Valencia, Spanish airline
- Armenischer Verein Zürich, association of Armenians in Zürich
