= Lukushi River =

River in the Democratic Republic of the Congo

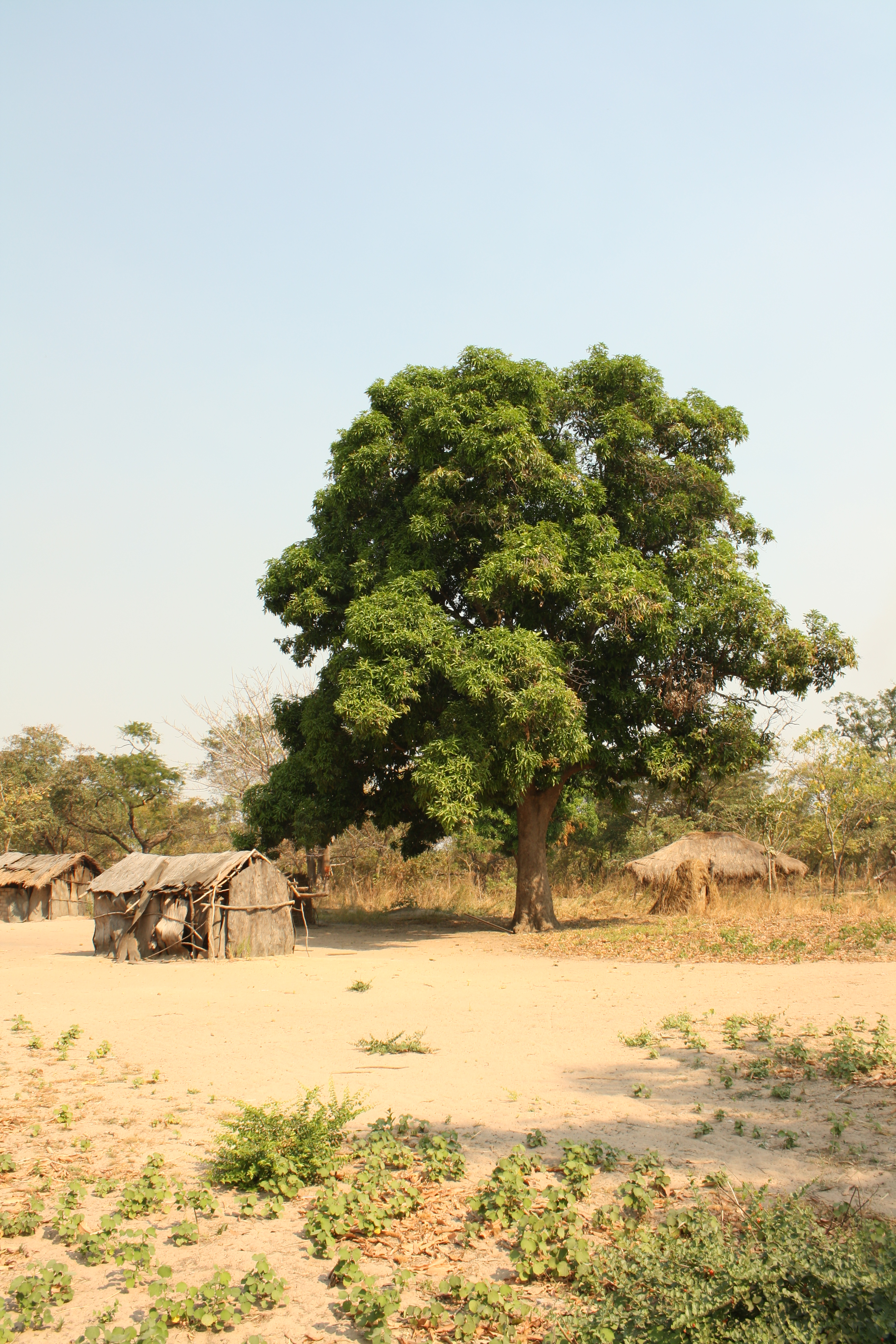
- Village near Manono

Location
- Country: Democratic Republic of the Congo

Physical characteristics
- Mouth
  - coordinates: 6.972946°S 27.515248°E

The Lukushi River is a tributary of the Luvua River. It runs from south to north through the Malemba-Nkulu Territory of Haut-Lomami Province and the Manono Territory of Tanganyika Province, passing the twin tin-mining towns of Kitotolo and Manono shortly before entering the Luvua.

In the early 1800s, King Kumwimbe of the Luba Kingdom created a client state that united the Hemba villages of the Lukushi River valley, and that played an important role in preserving Luba dominance over other small states in the region.

In 1932 Geomines was building a reservoir on the Lukushi River to contain 10,000,000 cubic metres (350,000,000 cu ft) of water to support tin mining operations at Manono. Water would be pumped from the reserve for washing operations in the dry season. A 1950 report on a campaign to eliminate malaria by spraying dwellings with DDT said the Lukushi River had been progressively silted up by tailings from mining operations. It now formed an immense swamp, with many old quarries that were excellent breeding places for malaria-carrying mosquitoes. Malaria was a serious problem at Manono.

A 1981 USAID project examined agricultural activity around Manono and the Lukushi valley based on aerial photographs. It found relatively little cultivation in 1957, with about 4,559 hectares (11,270 acres) of land in use. By 1978 the agricultural activity had increased fourfold, mostly within a 10 kilometres (6.2 mi) radius of Manono and Kitotolo and along the Lukushi to the north and south of Manono. However, by 1980 the zone of cultivation around Manono and Kitotolo had shrunk significantly. More smallholdings were being cultivated along the Luvua and upstream from Manono, and fewer downstream from Manono. Part of the change could be attributed to wetter ground in the downstream regions, but the main factor seemed to be economic problems due to deterioration of the mines in Manono.

== Sources ==
- "Belgian Congo...". Engineering and Mining Journal. 133. McGraw Hill Pub. Co. 1932.
- Blaes, X. (October 2008). "Découpage administratif de la République Démocratique du Congo" (PDF). PNUD-SIG. Archived from the original (PDF) on 2010-04-01.
- "Malaria control by means of DDT in Katanga" (PDF). World Health Organization. 2 October 1950.
- Reefe, Thomas Q. (1981). The rainbow and the kings: a history of the Luba Empire to 1891. University of California Press. ISBN 0-520-04140-2.
- Stanctoff, A.S.; Pesutti, Joseph (1981). "REPORT ON THE ACCOMPLISHMEBTS OF FRTS ZAIRE IN NORTH SHABA, 1980-1981" (PDF). USAID. Archived from the original (PDF) on April 25, 2012.
