= Ahmad Ssengendo =

Ugandan botanist, academic and academic administrator

- Born: 6 February 1959 (age 67); Bukanga, Isingiro District, Uganda
- Citizenship: Uganda
- Education: Makerere University (Bachelor of Science in botany) (Diploma in Education) (Master of Arts in education); University of Kansas (Doctor of Philosophy in education)
- Occupations: Academic & academic administrator
- Years active: Since 1980
- Known for: Academics
- Title: Assistant Secretary General of Economic Affairs, Organization of Islamic Cooperation since January 2021

Ahmad Kaweesa Ssengendo is a Ugandan botanist, academic, and academic administrator. He is the former Rector of the Islamic University in Uganda, a private university that was accredited by the Uganda National Council for Higher Education (UNCHE) in 1988. He was appointed to that position in 2004.

== Background ==
He was born in Bukanga Village, Isingiro District on 6 February 1959 to Yunus Kaweesa and Zuhurah Kaweesa.

== Education ==
He attended Kyaluhambura Primary School for his elementary education. He attended Old Kampala Secondary School for his O-Level studies, from 1973 until 1976. For his A-Level education, he relocated to St. Henry's College Kitovu, where he studied physics, chemistry, biology, and subsidiary mathematics.

He was admitted to Makerere University, the largest and oldest public university in Uganda. He graduated with a Bachelor of Science degree in Botany. He followed that with a Diploma in education. Later, he obtained a Master Arts in education, also from Makerere University. From 1985 until 1987, Ssengendo attended the University of Kansas, obtaining a Doctor of Philosophy in education degree.

== Work history ==
While pursuing his Diploma in Education, he taught at Nyamitanga Primary School and at Nyamitanga Secondary School in Mbarara, Mbarara District, Western Region. After obtaining the diploma, he joined the Department of Botany at Makerere University as an assistant lecturer. To augment his income, he concurrently taught at Old Kampala Senior Secondary School, his alma mater, and at Bilal Islamic Institute.

When he returned to Uganda after his PhD studies in 1987, he re-joined Makerere, but this time, in the School of Education. After barely one year, he left to join eight other educators, who teamed up to start the Islamic University in Uganda in 1988. Starting out as a Lecturer at IUIU, Ssengendo rose through the ranks to become University Secretary. In 2001, he was requested to start IUIU's Kampala Campus. From 2003 to 2004, he served as Deputy Vice Chancellor for Academics. In 2004, at the age of 45, he was appointed Vice Chancellor of IUIU.

== See also ==
- List of universities in Uganda
- List of university leaders in Uganda
- List of business schools in Uganda
- List of law schools in Uganda
- Education in Uganda
