= Géomines =

Former Belgian mining company

Compagnie Géologique et Minière des Ingénieurs et Industriels belges
- Trade name: Géomines
- Type: Mining
- Industry: Mining of other non-ferrous metal ores mining
- Founded: 1910
- Defunct: 1968
- Area served: Belgian Congo / Democratic Republic of the Congo

Géomines (Compagnie Géologique et Minière des Ingénieurs et Industriels belges) was a Belgian mining company active in the Belgian Congo and then in the Democratic Republic of the Congo. It was established in 1910, and exploited a large deposit in the southeast of the country to become one of the largest tin producers in the world. It was taken over by Zairetain in 1968.

== Belgian Congo ==
Belgian Congo

The Compagnie Géologique et Minière des Ingénieurs et Industriels belges (Géomines) was founded in 1910. Géomines was formed as a prospecting company by the president of John Cockerill, the metallurgical company, and geologists from the University of Liège. It found various kinds of mineral deposits, but much the most important was tin. A deposit of cassiterite was found in 1910 in Manono in Katanga Province (now in Tanganyika Province).

Géomines was given an exclusive concession in a large area. In 1915 extraction of cassiterite began in the Géomines concession, producing 150 tonnes per year. The deposits were near the surface and sometimes as much as 30 to 60 metres (98 to 197 ft) thick. They were dug up with shovels and crushed, and then the tin-bearing particles were washed out with water. The process was labor-intensive and proceeded slowly in the 1920s. With a monopoly on tin, Géomines followed the rational approach of extracting lower-grade ores while prices were high and higher-grade ores when prices were lower.

Géomines depended on Foraky, a subsidiary of the state-controlled Comité Spécial du Katanga (CSK), for much of the work. Foraky charged high prices for its work, thus transferring profit from Géomines to CSK. In 1920 the transition to a full-scale operating company required 12 million francs of additional capital. CSK provided 30% and the Société commerciale et Minière du Congo (Cominière) provided 22.5%, diluting the interest of the Liège group. In 1929 the capital was raised to 200 million francs. The CSK now had complete control of what had become one of the world's largest tin producers. Géomines was one of the five largest companies in the Belgian Congo before the Wall Street crash of 1929, the others being the Union Minière du Haut-Katanga (UMHK), Minière des Grands Lacs Africains, Compagnie du Katanga and Compagnie du Congo pour le Commerce et l'Industrie.

In 1932 Geomines was building a reservoir on the Lukushi River to contain 10,000,000 cubic metres (350,000,000 cu ft) of water to support tin mining operations at Manono. Water would be pumped from the reserve for washing operations in the dry season. Géomines was very profitable. From 1934 it consistently declared profits of about 33% of gross sales of its tin in Europe, or 15% of nominal capital.

== Post-independence ==
In 1966 2,818 tonnes of cassiterite were produced, falling to 2.543 tonnes in 1967. About 2,000 tonnes of smelter tin were produced in 1966 and 1967. In 1967 Géomines personnel included 50 European technicians and 3,500 Congolese. The Manono-Kitolo mine was worked almost continuously until the late 1970s, first by Géomines and later by Congo-Etain and Zairetain. Perhaps 180,000 tonnes of cassiterite ore were extracted in this period.

In March 1967 it was announced Géomines's operations were being transferred to the Société Géologique et Minière du Congo (GEMICO), which was 50% owned by the Congolese. Géomines was to remain responsible for technical operations and for marketing. The agreement had not been finalized by the end of the year. Géomines continued to be the only major company in the DRC that was completely directed from Belgium. In 1968 Zairetain acquired Géomines.

== Sources ==
- "Belgian Congo...". Engineering and Mining Journal. 133. McGraw Hill Pub. Co. 1932.
- Buelens, Frans; Marysse, Stefaan (August 2009), "Returns on Investments during the Colonial Era: The Case of the Belgian Congo", The Economic History Review, New Series, 62 (S1, Finance, Investment and Risk), Wiley on behalf of the Economic History Society: 135–166, doi:10.1111/j.1468-0289.2009.00482.x, JSTOR 20543010
- "Comité spécial du Katanga. CSK", Africa Museum
- Hillman, John (1997), "Chartered Companies and the Development of the Tin Industry in Belgian Africa, 1900–1939", African Economic History (25), University of Wisconsin Press: 149–173, doi:10.2307/3601883, JSTOR 3601883
- Manono-Kitotolo Lithium Tailings Project, Tantalex Resources Corporation
- Manono, United States Geological Survey
- Woodmansee, Walter C. (1969), "The Mineral Industry of the Democratic Republic of the Congo (Kinshasa)", Minerals yearbook: Area reports: international 1967 (PDF), vol. IV, Bureau of Mines, pp. 213–218
