= Malambo =

Malambo may refer to:

== Places ==
- Malambo, Cotabato, an inactive volcano on Mindanao, The Philippines
- Malambo, Atlántico, Colombia
- Malambo, Tanzania
- Malambo (constituency). a Zambian parliamentary constituency

== Films ==
- Malambo (1942 film), a 1942 film
- Malambo (1984 film), a 1984 film by Milan Dor
- Malambo, the Good Man, 2018 Argentine black-and-white drama film

== Other ==
- Malambo (dance), an Argentine folk step dance
- "Malambo No. 1", a song from Mambo! album by Yma Sumac
- Croton malambo, a tree of genus Croton, or its bark
