= Herman Kasekende =

Ugandan businessman and economist (born 1965)

- Born: Herman Kasekende; 1965 (age 60–61); Uganda
- Education: Makerere University (Bachelor of Arts in economics); Brandeis University (Master of Arts in economics and finance)
- Occupations: Businessman, economist, and bank executive
- Years active: 1995 - present
- Title: Managing director and CEO; Stanchart Zambia
- Spouse: 1

Herman Kizito Kasekende (born 1965) is a Ugandan businessman, economist, and bank executive. He is the managing director and chief executive officer of Stanchart Zambia, effective February 2017. Prior to that, from 22 July 2012 until 20 February 2017, he was the managing director and chief executive officer of Stanchart Uganda, the second-largest commercial bank in the country by assets, which totaled nearly US$965 million in December 2012.

== Background and education ==
Kasekende was born in the Buganda Region of Uganda circa 1965. He studied at St. Henry's College Kitovu for his O-Level and at St. Mary's College Kisubi for his A-Level education. His primary degree in economics was obtained from Makerere University. He holds a Master of Arts degree in international economics and finance from Brandeis University.

== Career ==
During the 1990s, Kasekende worked at Nile Bank Limited, a small indigenous financial services provider founded in 1988 that was acquired by Barclays Bank in 2007. In 1998, he left Nile Bank and joined Standard Chartered Uganda (SCBU). At SCBU, he has served in different capacities, including: (a) Senior relationship manager (wholesale banking) (b) General manager (shared distribution) (c) General Manager (SME banking) and (d) Head of consumer banking.

He also served on a short-term temporary basis at Standard Chartered Bank Singapore. Effective 22 July 2012, he was appointed managing director and chief executive officer (CEO), Standard Chartered Bank Uganda, a position he still held as of January 2015. He is the first Ugandan to serve as the CEO at SCBU in the 100+ year history of the Ugandan financial institution. Before January 2013, Kasekende worked closely with James Mulwana, who served as the chairman of SCBU from 1998 until his death in 2013. Mulwana's mentorship and tutelage is reported to have played a significant role in the ascendancy of Kasekende to the office of managing director and CEO at the bank.

== Other considerations ==
Kasekende is married with three children.

== See also ==
- List of banks in Uganda
- Standard Chartered Bank
- Banking in Uganda
