= Muyumba =

Muyumba is a surname. Notable people with the surname include:

- Francine Muyumba (born 1987), Congolese activist and politician
- Tristan Muyumba (born 1997), French-Congolese footballer

== See also ==
- Mulumba
