= St. Henry's College Kitovu =

Coordinates: 00°20′04″S 31°45′44″E

- Masaka, Masaka District; Uganda

Information
- Type: Public Middle School and High School
- Motto: "For Greater Horizons''
- Established: 1922
- Headteacher: Brother Wanambwa Martin
- Enrollment: 1,400+
- Colors: coffee brown and yellow
- Nickname: SHACK
- Publication: The Shuttle
- Alumni: Kitovians, Shackists

St. Henry's College Kitovu (SHACK), is a boys-only boarding middle and high school that is owned by the Brothers of Christian Instruction in Uganda, the third-largest economy in the East African Community.

== Location ==
The school campus is located on Kitovu Hill, elevation:1,300 metres (4,300 ft), situated in the eastern suburbs of the city of Masaka in Masaka District, the Central Region of Uganda. This is approximately 7 kilometres (4.3 mi), by road, south-east of the central business district of Masaka. Kitovu is approximately 140 kilometres (87 mi), by road, south-west of Kampala, the capital and largest city of Uganda. The coordinates of the campus are 0°20'04.0"S, 31°45'44.0"E (Latitude:-0.334444; Longitude:31.762222).

== Overview ==
The college was founded by the White Fathers in 1922. It lies about 3 kilometres (1.9 mi), by road, from Nyendo suburb, atop the Kitovu Hill near the Kitovu Catholic Cathedral. The main school campus covers a large expanse of land. The School has a population of over 1,000 students.

== History ==
=== The beginning ===
In September 1922, Adrian Laberge, a Canadian missionary of the White Fathers and a disciple of Cardinal Lavigerie, founded the school. The pioneer students came from the Lubaga School (current St. Mary's College Kisubi), which was also under the direction of the White Fathers. The beginnings were very humble, with three simple buildings of sun-dried bricks serving as classrooms and dormitories. The new institution was blessed by Bishop Henry Streicher, and it was placed under the protection of Saint Henry, patron of the Vicar Apostolic of Uganda.

During the next five years, the school was led by Father Laberge, with the help of Damasus Mukasa and the help of some other local men. The good progress of the school attracted the attention of the religious and civil authorities, increasing its profile. As it grew, the school needed more land for expansion. Ignatius Lule of Nyendo offered his land on top of Kitovu Hill. Charles Jules Poitras, founder and Superior of the Brothers in Uganda, visited the school accompanied by Joachim Leo Collerette. They were impressed by what they saw, and gave a positive report. In August 1927, Eugene Paquette and Donat Trudel assumed leadership at Kitovu, working closely with Paul Kigozi and Stephen Kayongo. In 1936, the Education Department reshuffled the country's system of education and Kitovu was transformed into a junior secondary school. At that time, St. Henry's School had 95 pupils, in four classes.

=== The middle years ===
The period between 1950 and 1960 saw the college standing on a firm footing in the Cambridge Certificate course. This, however, was not achieved without difficulties, for the growth required new classrooms, an upgraded library, laboratories, and dormitories. After careful consideration, the authorities decided that St. Henry's should be permitted to stand on equal terms and share the same privileges as other schools of the same footing in the country. In 1969, the Higher School Certificate course was introduced. The result was that, by 1972, the year of St. Henry's Golden Jubilee, the school population had passed the 1,000 resident students, with over 80 buildings spread over the large campus.

== Reputation ==
In 2006, the college produced the top eight "O" Level graduates in the Masaka District.

The college has also gone on to maintain its position as the best Ugandan school south of the equator. In modern days students of similar institutions have identified the college as one of The G8’s of Ugandan education.

== Academics ==
A variety of science and arts subjects is offered. The school has both ordinary ("O") and advanced ("A") levels. The ordinary level is for four years, from senior one to senior four while the Advanced level is for two years, from senior five to senior six.

Subjects offered at "O" Level include Biology, Chemistry, Christian religious education, Entrepreneurship, Agriculture, Computer studies, English language, Literature in English, Fine art, French, Geography, History, Mathematics, Physics, Technical drawing(TD) and Kiswahili.

At "A" level, the arts and sciences subjects offered are history, economics, divinity, French, literature in English, geography, and fine art. The science subjects offered are physics, chemistry, mathematics, biology, and technical drawing. Subsidiary mathematics and general paper are compulsory subjects and students are required to choose one to offer with their three chosen Arts or Sciences subjects.

== Houses of residence ==
The College has twelve houses of residence. They are in two sections of the houses of residence. One is referred to as “Gutter”, housing mainly S.1 to S.2 students, the other, “California”, housing mainly S.3 to S.4, and lastly "Washington DC" S.5 to S.6 students.

Gutter

- Laberge
- Kizito
- Muteesa
- Mugwanya
- Kiwanuka
- Eugene

California

- Buddu I
- Buddu II
- Mukudde I
- Mukudde II
- Kyewalyanga I
- Kyewalyanga II
- Lwanga I
- Lwanga II

Washington DC

- Block A
- Block B
- Block C

== Prominent alumni ==
The following are prominent alumni of the school.

=== Politicians ===
- Benedicto Kiwanuka
- Paul Ssemogerere
- Ken Lukyamuzi
- John Byabagambi
- Elly Tumwine
- Faustin Kayumba Nyamwasa
- Musinguzi Yona

=== Lawyers ===
- Charles Mayiga

=== Academics ===
- Ahmad Ssengendo

=== Bankers and accountants ===
- Herman Kasekende

=== Musicians ===
- Ragga Dee

=== Sportsmen ===
- David Obua
- Emmanuel Okwi

=== Writers ===
- Mulumba Ivan Matthias

=== Others ===
- Godfrey Kateregga
