= Gerald Karuhanga =

Ugandan politician

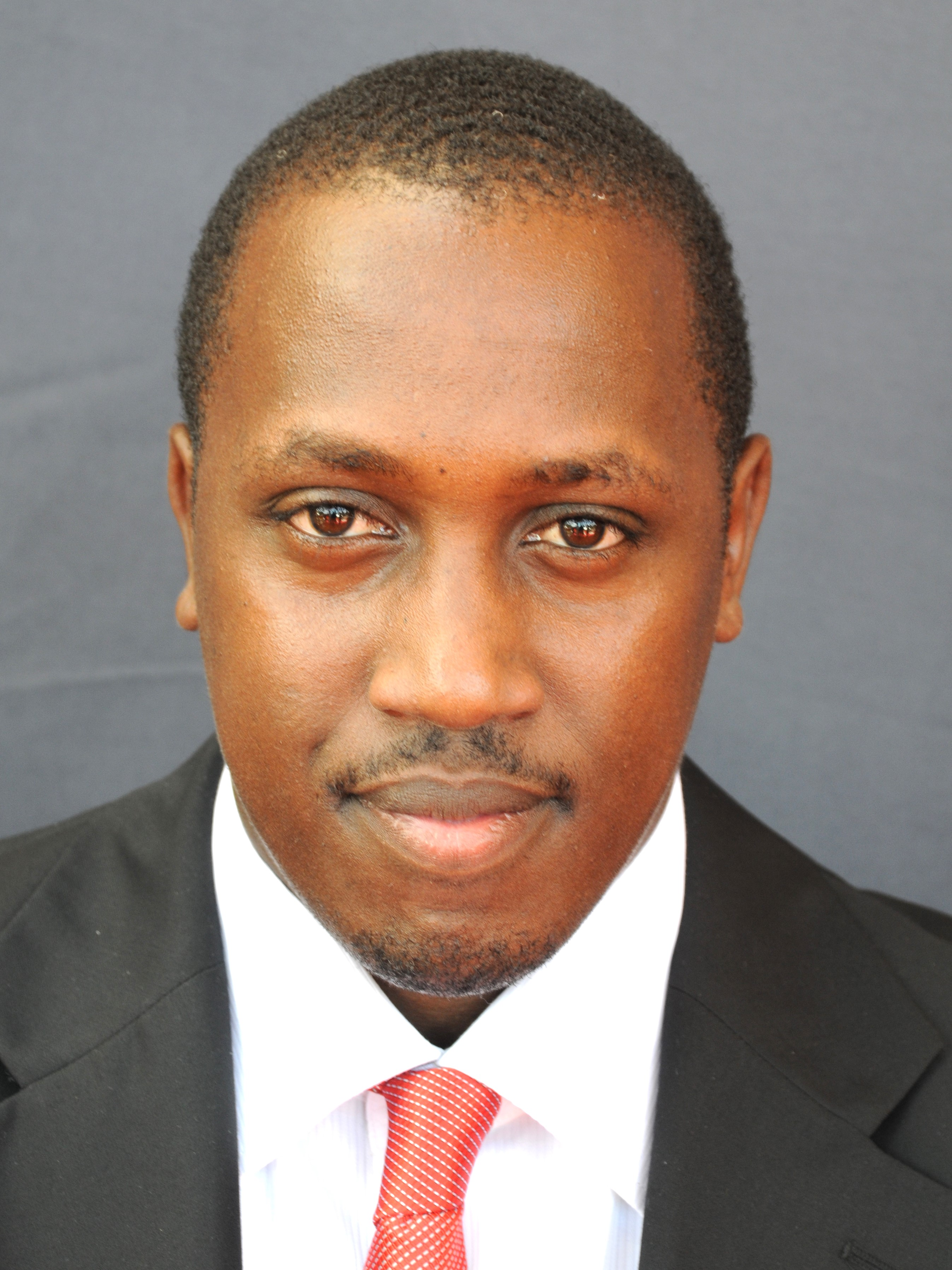

Member of Parliament for Ntungamo Municipality

Youth Member of Parliament
- Incumbent
- Assumed office March 2011

Personal details
- Born: July 14, 1982 (age 44) Itojo, Ntungamo District, Uganda
- Party: Independent
- Occupation: Lawyer, politician

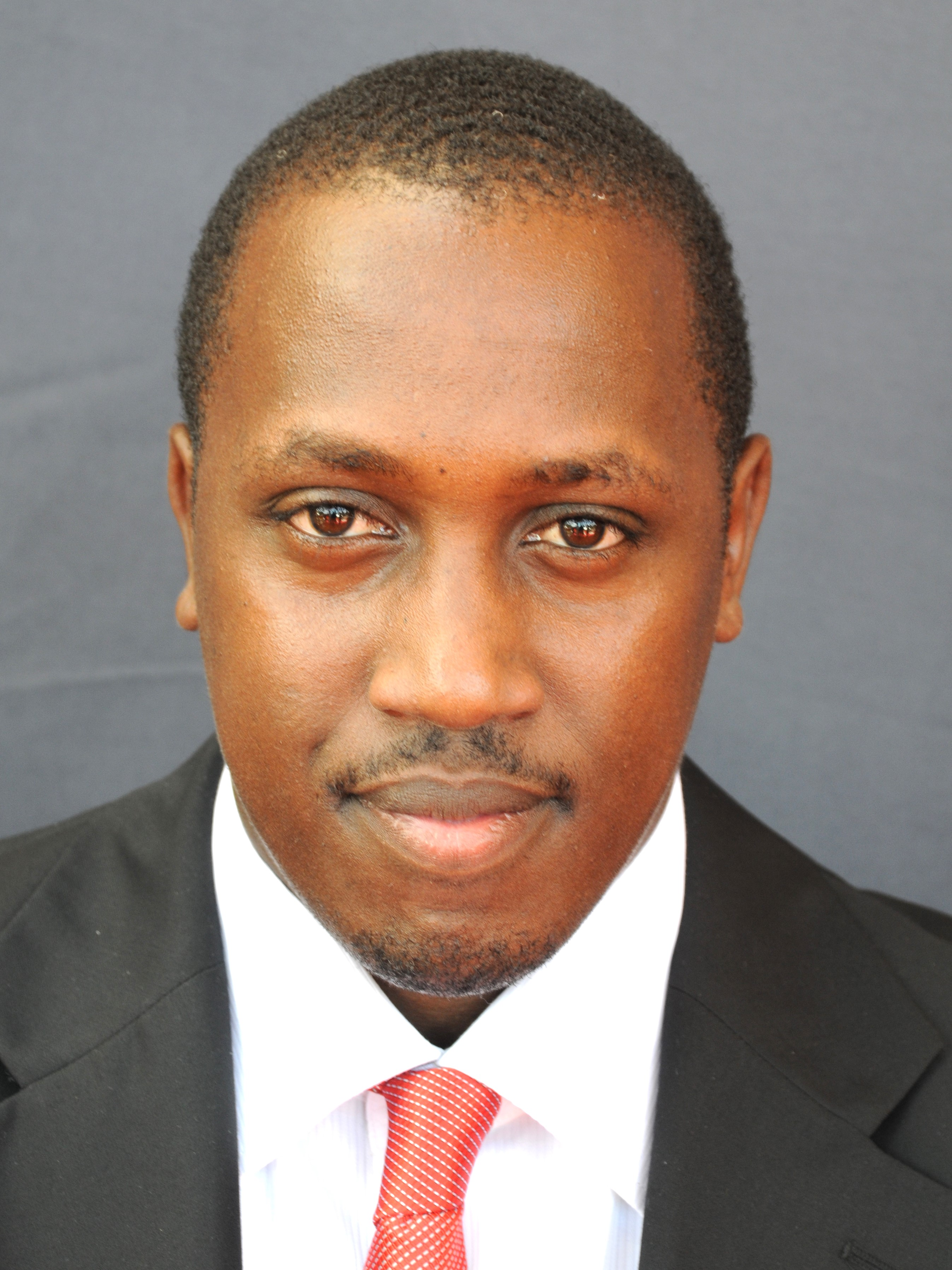

Gerald Karuhanga (b. 14 July 1982) is a Ugandan lawyer and politician. He is a member of the Parliament of Uganda representing Ntungamo Municipality. He became a member of the 12th parliament on an independent ticket, although is he is a member of Alliance for National Transformation (ANT).

== Early life ==
Karuhanga was born to Jacob Kafureeka Jaka Jex in Itojo in Ntungamo District in 1982. He attended Kitunga Boarding Primary School and Kitabi seminary for his O'level education. At Kitabi he served as deputy head prefect. For his A'level, Karuhanga went to St. Mary's College Kisubi.

He enrolled at Makerere University where he earned a bachelors degree in law, graduating in 2008. In 2009 he acquired a certificate in legal practice from Law Development Center (LDC). He holds a certificate of Emerging Leaders from Harvard University.

== Career ==
While at Makerere, Karuhanga served as Guild president, a position he won on the FDC ticket in 2006. In March 2011 Karuhanga was elected to the parliament of Uganda as a youth representative. He served as the vice chairperson of the Public accounts committee (PAC). He also served as chairman of the parliamentary and corruption forum and African parliament network against corruption (APNAC) Uganda chapter.

He represents Ntungamo municipality in the 12th Parliament of Uganda.
