= Microlite =

Mineral

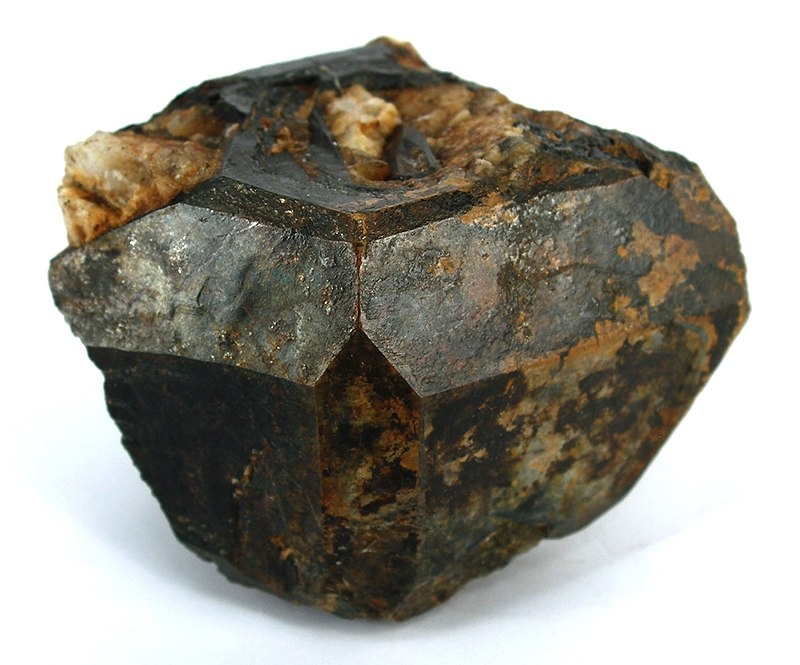

General
- Category: Oxide minerals
- Formula: (Na,Ca)_{2}Ta_{2}O_{6}(O,OH,F)
- IMA symbol: Mic
- Strunz classification: 04.DH.15
- Crystal system: Cubic
- Space group: Fd3̅m (no. 227)

Identification

Microlite was once known as a pale-yellow, reddish-brown, or black isometric mineral composed of sodium calcium tantalum oxide with a small amount of fluorine. Its chemical formula is (Na,Ca)_{2}Ta_{2}O_{6}(O,OH,F). Today it is a name of a group of oxide minerals of a similar stoichiometry having tantalum prevailing over titanium and niobium. The microlite group belongs to a large pyrochlore supergroup that occurs in pegmatites and constitutes an ore of tantalum. It has a Mohs hardness of 5.5 and a variable specific gravity of 4.2 to 6.4. It occurs as disseminated microscopic subtranslucent to opaque octahedral crystals with a refractive index of 2.0 to 2.2. Microlite is also called djalmaite, but both names are now obsolete.

"Microlite" occurs as a primary mineral in lithium-bearing granite pegmatites, and in miarolitic cavities in granites. Association minerals include: albite, lepidolite, topaz, beryl, tourmaline, spessartine, tantalite and fluorite.

"Microlite" was first described in 1835 for an occurrence on the Island of Uto, State of Stockholm, Sweden. Another occurrence of microlite is the Clark Ledges pegmatite, Chesterfield, Hampshire County, Massachusetts. The name is from Greek mikros for "small" and lithos for "stone".

== Additional reading ==
- Andrade, M. B., Atencio, D., Menezes Filho, L. A., & Ellena, J. (2011). The crystal structure of a microlite-group mineral with a formula near NaCaTa2O6F from the Morro Redondo mine, Coronel Murta, Minas Gerais, Brazil (vol 49, pg 615, 2011). Canadian Mineralogist, 49(5), 1338–1338.
- Atencio, D., Andrade, M. B., Christy, A. G., Gieré, R., & Kartashov, P. M. (2010). The pyrochlore supergroup of minerals: nomenclature. The Canadian Mineralogist, 48(3), 673–698.
- Barthelmy, David (2014). "Microlite Mineral Data". Mineralogy Database. Webmineral.com.
- "Microlite". Mindat.org.
- Palache, C., H. Berman, and C. Frondel (1944) Dana’s system of mineralogy, (7th edition), v. I, 748–757
