= Malimba =

Malimba may refer to:

- Limba people (Cameroon)
- Malimba language of Cameroon
- Malimba, Gabon
- In East and Southeast Africa, a musical instrument analogous to either a marimba or a mbira
