= Ivan Matthias Mulumba =

Ugandan writer and valuation surveyor

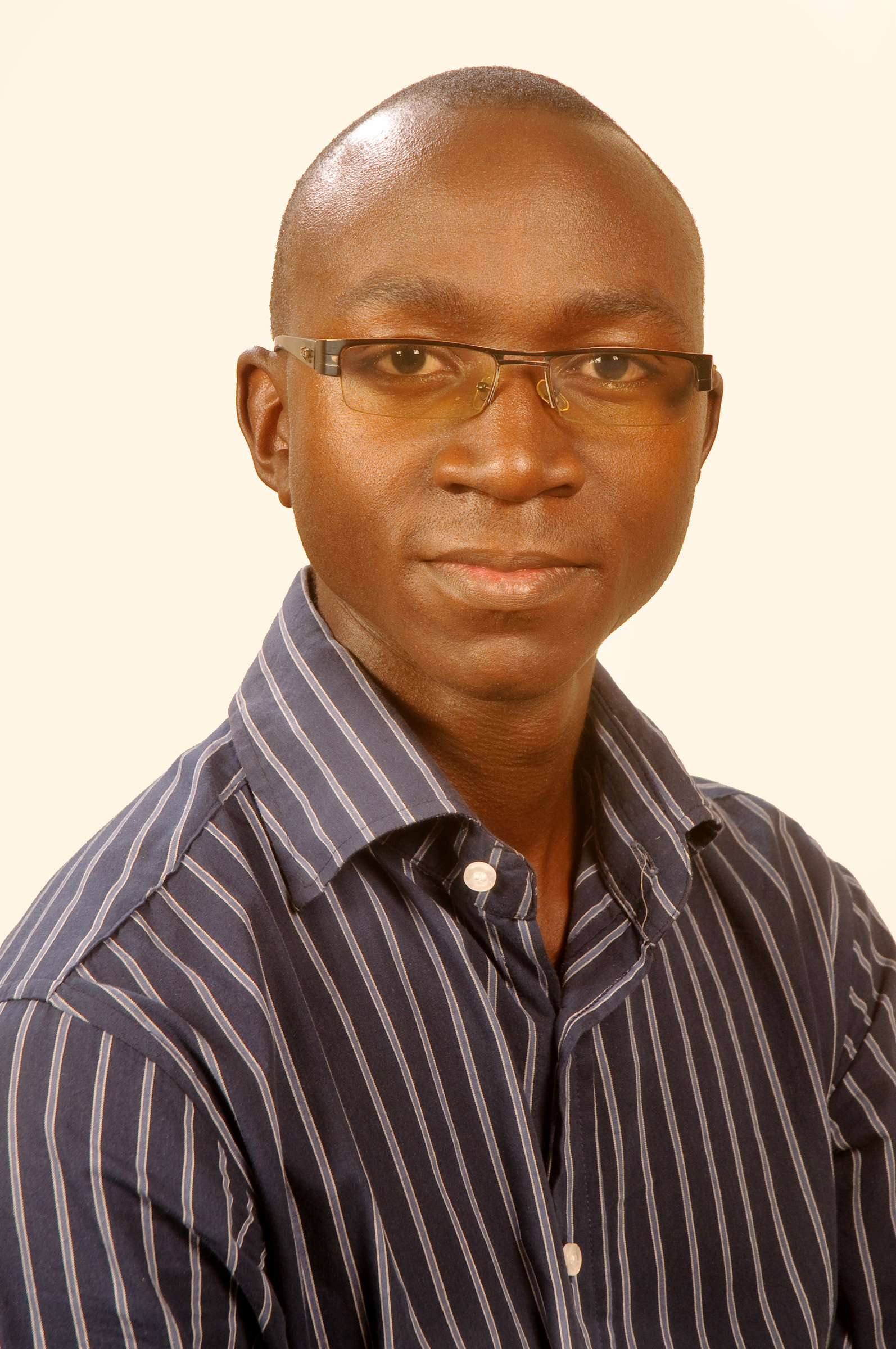
- Matthias in 2013
- Born: Mulumba Ivan Matthias; Masaka, Uganda
- Education: St. Henry's College Kitovu (Uganda Certificate of Education) (Uganda Advanced Certificate of Education); Makerere University (Bachelor of Science in Land Economics)
- Occupations: Valuation surveyor, writer
- Writing career
- Genres: Fiction, poetry
- Notable works: Poetry in Motion, The Honking
- Website: mimulumba.wordpress.com

Ivan Matthias Mulumba is a Ugandan writer and valuation surveyor. He is the author of two collections of poems, Poetry in Motion and Rumblings of a tree, and a novel, The Honking. His work has appeared in The Kalahari Review, Reader's Cafe Africa, Africa Book Club, Munyori literary journal, Lawino-magazine, and Sooo Many Stories. He was nominated for the 2018 Young Achievers Awards.

== Early life and education ==
Mulumba was born in Masaka District in the Central Region of Uganda to Gerald Jjagwe and Dorothy Namakula Jjagwe. His father worked as a valuation surveyor while his mother ran a bookshop. When his mother's bookshop closed, the books were stocked at home, something that introduced Mulumba to reading early in his life and sparked a desire for storytelling.

He studied at Bishop Ddungu Boarding Primary School, Blessed Sacrament Kimaanya Primary School, St. Henry's College Kitovu, and then Makerere University, where he obtained a Bachelor of Science degree in Land Economics.

== Writing ==
Mulumba's first collection of poems, Poetry in Motion, was called "an enterprising first" by the Africa Book Club.

The Daily Monitor called it "an anthology that chronicles the first steps of a poet, and captures the beliefs, experiences and some ideologies in society".

His story "Chasing my tail" was runner-up for the October 2013 Africa Book Club short reads competition. Another story, "Into the Bush", was the winning story in December 2013 for the same monthly competition.

His work has also been featured on the Pan-African poetry platform Badilisha Poetry Radio.

== Works ==
=== Novels ===
- The Honking. Mattville Publishing House. 2017. ISBN 978-9970-9570-02.

=== Short story collection ===
- Blank walls: Obwenyi bw'emirimago. Uganda: Mattville Publishing House. 2020. ISBN 978-9970-732-01-2

=== Poetry collections ===
- Poetry in motion revised edition. Uganda: Mattville Publishing House. 2020. ISBN 978-9970-884-00-1.
- Rumblings of a tree. Mattville Publishing House. 2017. ISBN 978-9970-9570-19.
- Poetry in Motion. Mattville Publishing House. 2012. ISBN 978-9970-9050-03.

=== Poems ===
- "Children of the Wind", "Listen", "Froth", in Mildred K. Barya, ed. (2015). Boda Boda Anthem and other poems: A Kampala Poetry Anthology. BN Poetry Foundation. ISBN 9789970923427.
- "Doorway", in Beverley Nambozo Nsengiyunva, ed. (2014). A thousand voices rising: An anthology of contemporary African poetry. BN Poetry Foundation. ISBN 978-9970-9234-0-3.
- "Urchin" and "Naked thief", in Vivian Nyame, ed. (2011). Whispers from Africa: a poetry anthology. WordArts Publishers. ISBN 9781466323742.
- "Mary has a ball", in Okaka Dokatum, Rose Rwakasisi, ed. (2010). The Butterfly Dance: words and sounds of colour. Femrite Publications. ISBN 9789970700233.
- "My Palestine", and "When nobody is watching" in Badilisha Poetry - Pan African Poets (2016)
- "Until I See No More", "Light" and "Such A Thief " in Kalahari Review (2015)
- "Forever Gone" in Sooo Many Stories (2015)
- "Shamim", "A Memory", "Breathe", "The love of my life" and "Rumblings of a tree" in Munyori literary journal (2014)
- "Chicken Fight, and Enough" in The Kalahari Review (2014)
- "Trumpeter, and Void" in The Kalahari Review (2013)

=== Short fiction ===
- "Into the Bush" and "Chasing my tail", in Daniel Musiitwa, ed. (2014). The Bundle of Joy and Other Stories from Africa: Africa Book Club Anthology: Volume 1. Aalvent Books. ISBN 978-1941221044.
- "Jar of misfortune" in Lawino (2015)
- "Blank walls" in The Kalahari Review (2014)
- "Into the darkness" in Reader's Cafe Africa (2013)

== Awards and recognition ==
- Nominated for the 2018 Young Achievers Awards.
