= Malambo, Tanzania =

Coordinates: 02°30′S 35°36′E

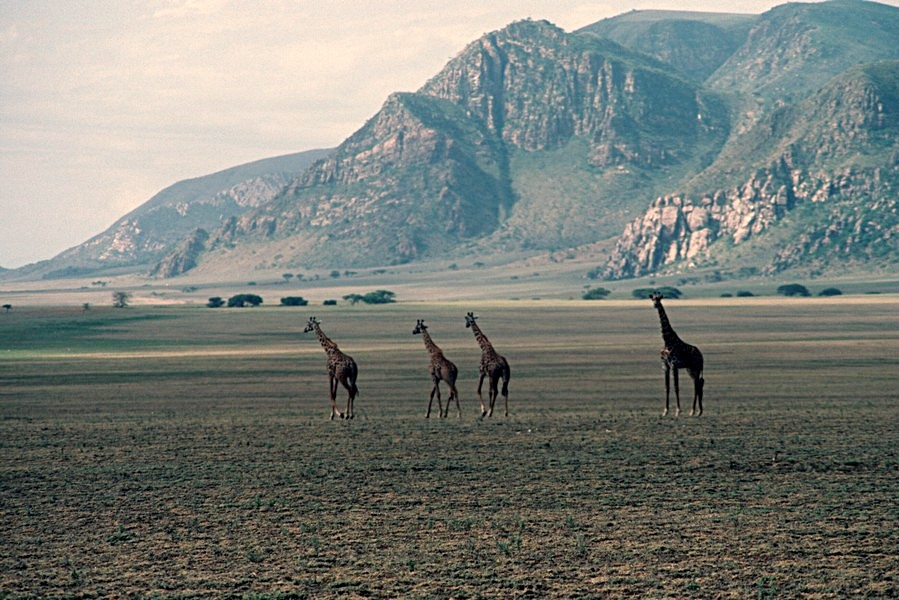
Giraffe on Plain near Malambo Village, Arusha Region

Malambo is a village in the Arusha Region of northern Tanzania, located near the Sanjan River, east of the Serengeti, west of Lake Natron, and north of Ngorongoro, in a picturesque but remote region. It is on the western edge of the Eastern Rift Valley, bordered by mountains on the west and a vast plain on the east.

Malambo has served as a home for many Maasai, and a rest stop for many more who pass through the region. It boasts a school, a medical clinic, a maternity clinic, and a small airstrip, though the village is still considered remote and impoverished. Because it is close to areas that are popular tourist safari attractions, visitors occasionally pass through.

In 2022-2023, Maasai people in the area raised concerns about forcible displacement by authorities seeking to limit settlement in the nearby Ngorongoro Conservation Area.

== Notable people ==
Latang'amwaki Ndwati Mollel

== Malambo, Rukwa Region ==
Malambo' is a village in western Tanzania on the road between Sumbawanga, the capital of Rukwa Region, and Kigoma, the port city on the northern shore of Lake Tanganyika. It is on the western edge of Katavi National Park, a rarely visited park abundant with wildlife. This western area of Tanzania is remote with few tourist facilities and rarely visited by tourist safaris.
