= Tapiolite =

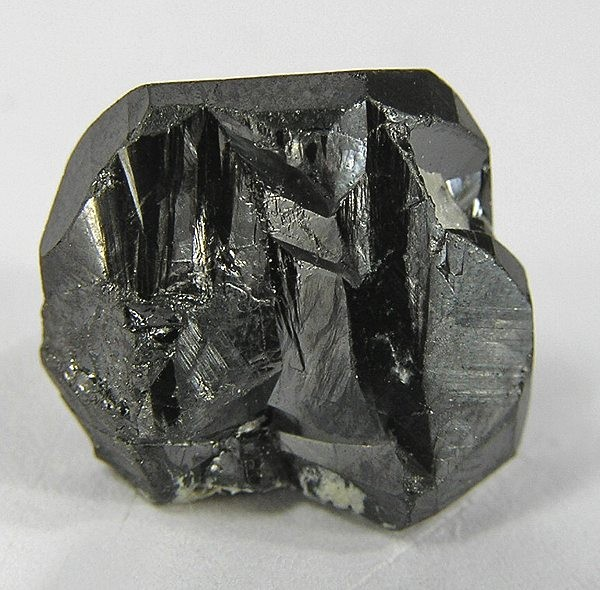

General
- Category: Minerals
- Formula: (Fe, Mn)(Nb, Ta)_{2}O_{6}
- IMA symbol: Tap
- Crystal system: Tetragonal
- Crystal class: Ditetragonal dipyramidal (4/mmm); H-M symbol: (4/m 2/m 2/m)
- Space group: P4_{2}/mnm

Identification

Tapiolite [(Fe, Mn)(Nb, Ta)_{2}O_{6}] is a black mineral series that is an ore of niobium and tantalum. The tapiolite group includes tapiolite-(Fe) or ferrotapiolite and tapiolite-(Mn) or manganotapiolite. Tapiolite-(Fe) is by far the more common of the two.

The minerals have a submetallic luster and a high specific gravity with tapiolite-Fe having a higher specific gravity (7.90) versus 7.72 for tapiolite-Mn.

The mineral was named in 1863 after the forest god Tapio of Finnish mythology, and the original tapiolite material came from Sukula, Tammela, Kanta-Häme, Finland.

Tapiolite is very close to columbite and tantalite. Those minerals have the same chemical composition, but different crystal symmetry orthorhombic for tantalite or columbite and tetragonal for tapiolite.

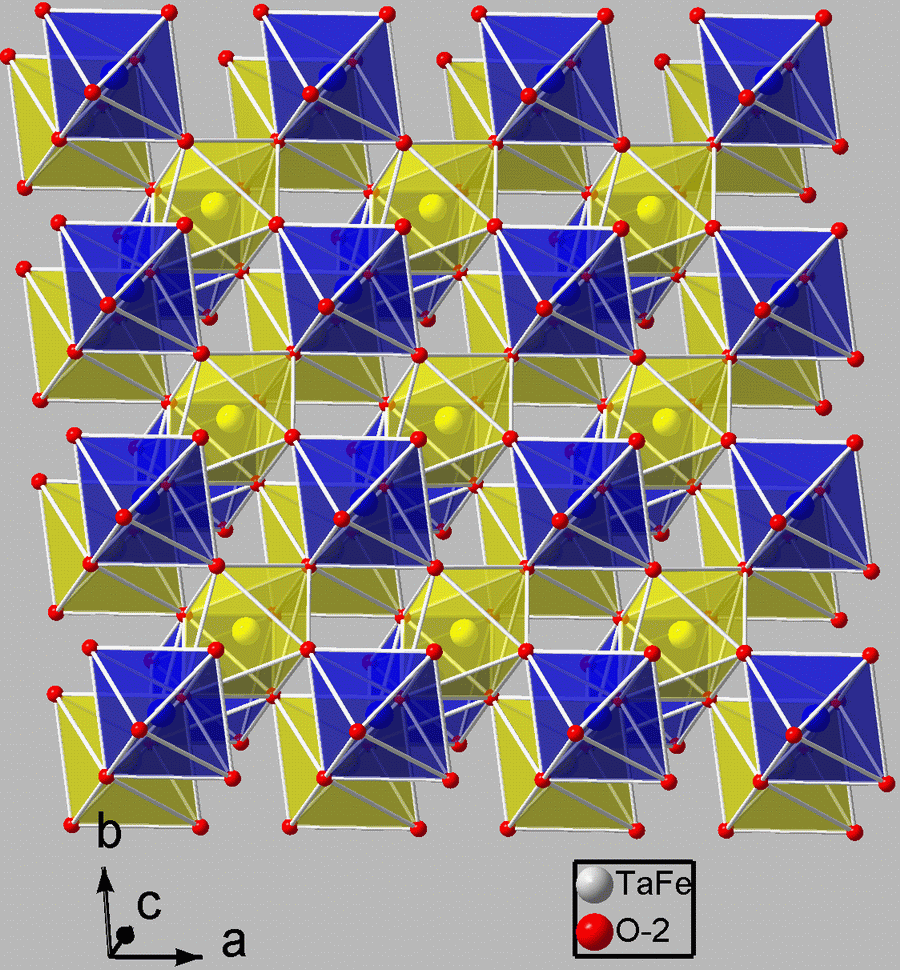
Crystal structure of tapiolite
