= Manono Airport =

Airport in Tanganyika Province, DR Congo

- IATA: none; ICAO: FZRA

Summary
- Airport type: Public
- Serves: Manono
- Elevation AMSL: 2,077 ft / 633 m
- Coordinates: 7°17′20″S 27°23′40″E

Map
- Location of the airport in Democratic Republic of the Congo

Runways
Direction	Length		Surface
Direction	m	ft	Surface
09/27	1,365	4,478	Gravel
- Sources: Google Maps GCM

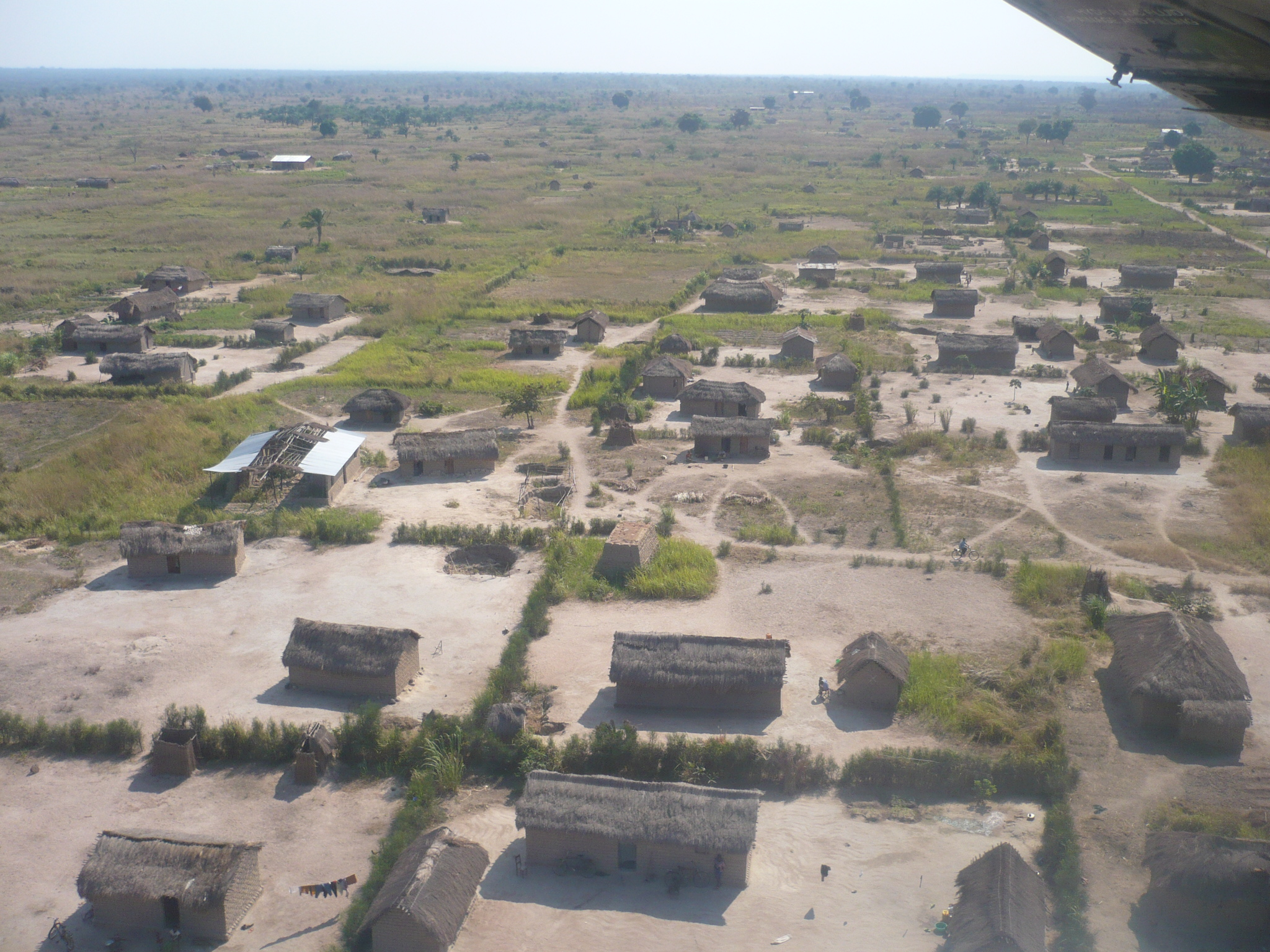
The town of Manono, Katanga taken from onboard from an aeroplane

Manono Airport (IATA: MNO, ICAO: FZRA) is an airport serving Manono, a city in Tanganyika Province, Democratic Republic of the Congo. The runway is within the city.

== See also ==
- Transport in the Democratic Republic of the Congo
- List of airports in the Democratic Republic of the Congo
