= AVZ Minerals =

Australian mining company operating in Africa

AVZ Minerals is an Australian mining company with the primary focus in mining lithium and tin in the Democratic Republic of the Congo, notably the Manono-Kitolo mine, one of the largest lithium reserves in the world, and in which it holds a major stake via its subsidiary, Dathcom Mining. Since early 2020s, the company has been involved in major litigations and was delisted from the Australian Securities Exchange (formerly ticker: AVZ).
