= Tantalum =

Chemical element with atomic number 73

Tantalum, _{73}Ta
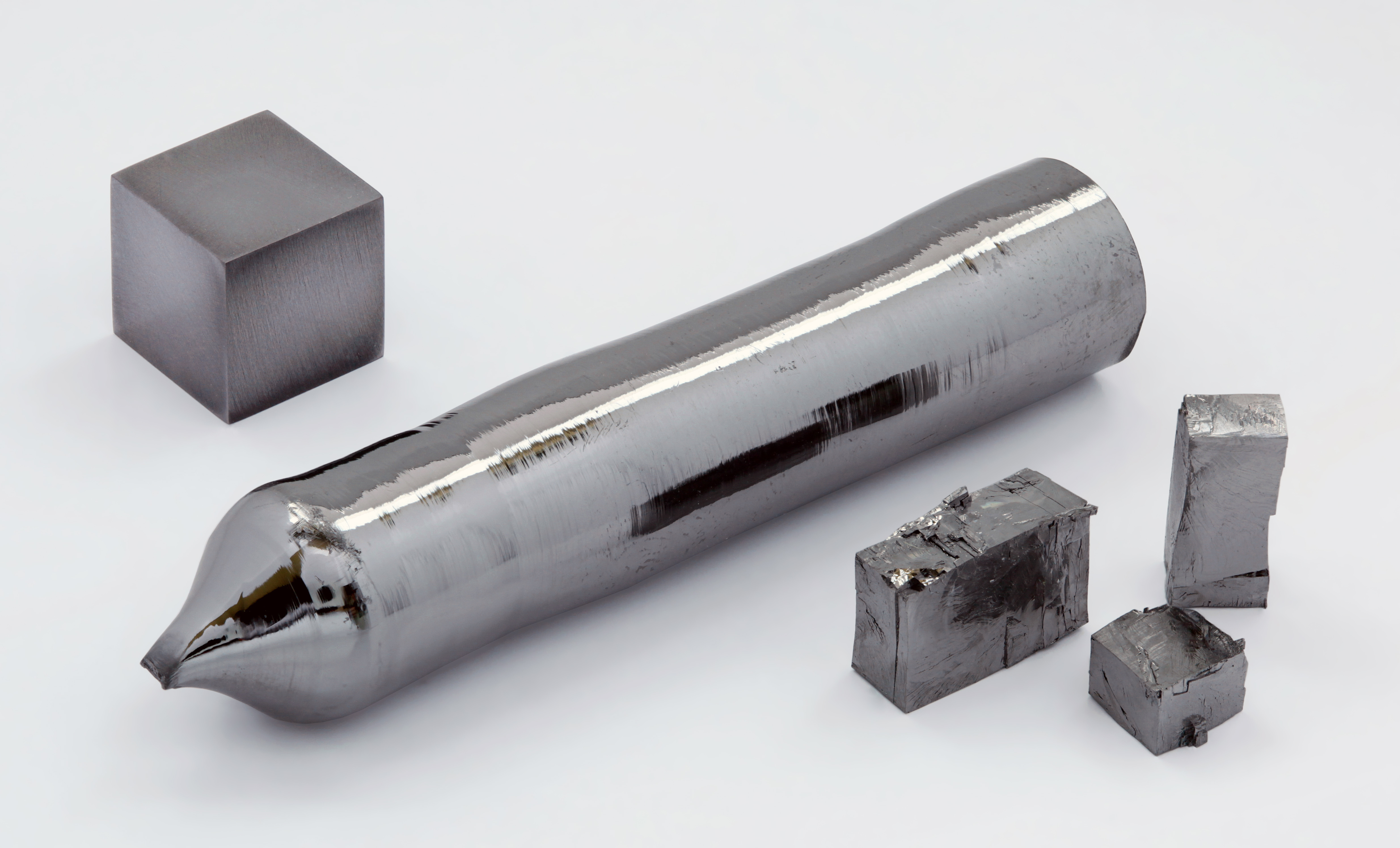

Tantalum
- Pronunciation: /ˈtæntələm/ (TAN-təl-əm)
- Appearance: gray blue

Standard atomic weight A_{r}°(Ta)
- 180.94788±0.00002; 180.95±0.01 (abridged)

Tantalum in the periodic table
Hydrogen																															Helium
Lithium	Beryllium																									Boron	Carbon	Nitrogen	Oxygen	Fluorine	Neon
Sodium	Magnesium																									Aluminium	Silicon	Phosphorus	Sulfur	Chlorine	Argon
Potassium	Calcium															Scandium	Titanium	Vanadium	Chromium	Manganese	Iron	Cobalt	Nickel	Copper	Zinc	Gallium	Germanium	Arsenic	Selenium	Bromine	Krypton
Rubidium	Strontium															Yttrium	Zirconium	Niobium	Molybdenum	Technetium	Ruthenium	Rhodium	Palladium	Silver	Cadmium	Indium	Tin	Antimony	Tellurium	Iodine	Xenon
Caesium	Barium	Lanthanum	Cerium	Praseodymium	Neodymium	Promethium	Samarium	Europium	Gadolinium	Terbium	Dysprosium	Holmium	Erbium	Thulium	Ytterbium	Lutetium	Hafnium	Tantalum	Tungsten	Rhenium	Osmium	Iridium	Platinum	Gold	Mercury (element)	Thallium	Lead	Bismuth	Polonium	Astatine	Radon
Francium	Radium	Actinium	Thorium	Protactinium	Uranium	Neptunium	Plutonium	Americium	Curium	Berkelium	Californium	Einsteinium	Fermium	Mendelevium	Nobelium	Lawrencium	Rutherfordium	Dubnium	Seaborgium	Bohrium	Hassium	Meitnerium	Darmstadtium	Roentgenium	Copernicium	Nihonium	Flerovium	Moscovium	Livermorium	Tennessine	Oganesson
Nb
↑
Ta
↓
Db
hafnium ← tantalum → tungsten
- Atomic number (Z): 73
- Group: group 5
- Period: period 6
- Block: d-block
- Electron configuration: [Xe] 4f^{14} 5d^{3} 6s^{2}
- Electrons per shell: 2, 8, 18, 32, 11, 2

Physical properties
- Phase at STP: solid
- Melting point: 3290 K (3017 °C, 5463 °F)
- Boiling point: 5731 K (5458 °C, 9856 °F)
- Density (at 20° C): 16.678 g/cm^{3}
- when liquid (at m.p.): 15 g/cm^{3}
- Heat of fusion: 36.57 kJ/mol
- Heat of vaporization: 753 kJ/mol
- Molar heat capacity: 25.36 J/(mol·K)
- Specific heat capacity: 140.149 J/(kg·K)
Vapor pressure
P (Pa)	1	10	100	1 k	10 k	100 k
at T (K)	3297	3597	3957	4395	4939	5634

Atomic properties
- Oxidation states: common: +5 −3, −1, 0, +1, +2, +3, +4
- Electronegativity: Pauling scale: 1.5
- Ionization energies: 1st: 761 kJ/mol; 2nd: 1500 kJ/mol
- Atomic radius: empirical: 146 pm
- Covalent radius: 170±8 pm
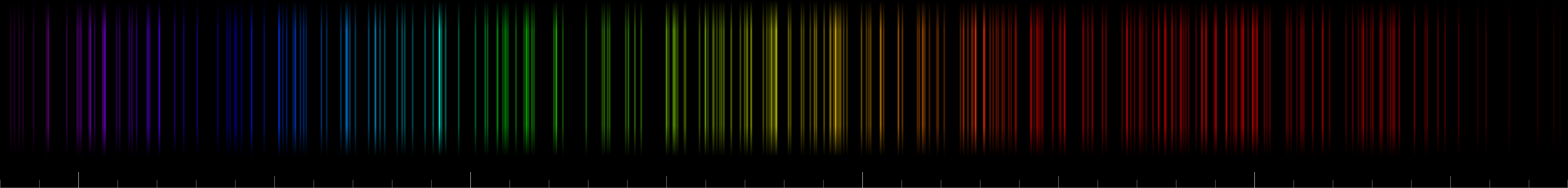
- Spectral lines of tantalum

Other properties
- Natural occurrence: primordial
- Crystal structure: body-centered cubic (bcc) (cI2)
- Lattice constant: a = 330.29 pm (at 20 °C)
- Thermal expansion: 6.3 µm/(m⋅K) (at 25 °C)
- Thermal conductivity: 57.5 W/(m⋅K)
- Electrical resistivity: 131 nΩ⋅m (at 20 °C)
- Magnetic ordering: paramagnetic
- Molar magnetic susceptibility: +154.0×10^{−6} cm^{3}/mol (293 K)
- Young's modulus: 186 GPa
- Shear modulus: 69 GPa
- Bulk modulus: 200 GPa
- Speed of sound thin rod: 3400 m/s (at 20 °C)
- Poisson ratio: 0.34
- Mohs hardness: 6.5
- Vickers hardness: 870–1200 MPa
- Brinell hardness: 440–3430 MPa
- CAS Number: 7440-25-7

History
- Naming: after Tantalus, Greek mythological figure
- Discovery: Anders Gustaf Ekeberg (1802)
- Recognized as a distinct element by: Heinrich Rose (1844)

Isotopes of tantalum
Main isotopes			Decay	
Isotope	abundance	half-life (t_{1/2})	mode	product
^{177}Ta	synth	56.36 h	β^{+}	^{177}Hf
^{178}Ta	synth	2.36 h	β^{+}	^{178}Hf
^{179}Ta	synth	1.82 y	ε	^{179}Hf
^{180}Ta	synth	8.154 h	ε	^{180}Hf
^{180}Ta	synth	8.154 h	β^{−}	^{180}W
^{180m}Ta	0.012%	observ. stable		
^{181}Ta	99.988%	stable		
^{182}Ta	synth	114.74 d	β^{−}	^{182}W
^{183}Ta	synth	5.1 d	β^{−}	^{183}W

Tantalum is a chemical element; it has symbol Ta and atomic number 73. It is named after Tantalus, a figure in Greek mythology. Tantalum is a very hard, ductile, lustrous, blue-gray transition metal that is highly corrosion-resistant. It is part of the refractory metals group, which are widely used as components of strong high-melting-point alloys. It is a group 5 element, along with vanadium and niobium, and it always occurs in geologic sources together with the chemically similar niobium, mainly in the mineral groups tantalite and columbite (coltan).

The chemical inertness and very high melting point of tantalum make it valuable for laboratory and industrial equipment such as reaction vessels and vacuum furnaces. It is used in tantalum capacitors for electronic equipment such as computers. It is being investigated for use as a material for high-quality superconducting resonators in quantum processors.

== History ==
Tantalum was discovered in Sweden in 1802 by Anders Ekeberg, in two mineral samples – one from Sweden and the other from Finland. One year earlier, Charles Hatchett had discovered niobium (then known as columbium). In 1809, the English chemist William Hyde Wollaston compared the oxides of columbium and tantalum – columbite and tantalite. Although the two oxides had different measured densities of 5.918 g/cm^{3} and 7.935 g/cm^{3}, he concluded that they were identical and kept the name tantalum. After Friedrich Wöhler confirmed these results, it was thought that columbium and tantalum were the same element. This conclusion was disputed in 1846 by the German chemist Heinrich Rose, who argued that there were two additional elements in the tantalite sample, and he named them after the children of Tantalus: niobium (from Niobe), and pelopium (from Pelops). The supposed element "pelopium" was later identified as a mixture of tantalum and niobium, and it was found that the niobium was identical to the columbium already discovered in 1801 by Hatchett.

The differences between tantalum and niobium were demonstrated unequivocally in 1864 by Christian Wilhelm Blomstrand and Henri Etienne Sainte-Claire Deville, as well as by Louis J. Troost, who determined the empirical formulas of some of their compounds in 1865. Further confirmation came from the Swiss chemist Jean Charles Galissard de Marignac, in 1866, who proved that there were only two elements. These discoveries did not stop scientists from publishing articles about the so-called ilmenium until 1871. De Marignac was the first to produce the metallic form of tantalum in 1864, when he reduced tantalum chloride by heating it in an atmosphere of hydrogen. Early investigators had only been able to produce impure tantalum, and the first relatively pure ductile metal was produced by Werner von Bolton in Charlottenburg in 1903. Wires made with metallic tantalum were used for light bulb filaments until tungsten replaced it in widespread use.

The name tantalum was derived from the name of the mythological Tantalus, the father of Niobe in Greek mythology. In the story, he had been punished after death by being condemned to stand knee-deep in water with perfect fruit growing above his head, both of which eternally tantalized him. (If he bent to drink the water, it drained below the level he could reach, and if he reached for the fruit, the branches moved out of his grasp.) Anders Ekeberg wrote "This metal I call tantalum ... partly in allusion to its incapacity, when immersed in acid, to absorb any and be saturated."

For decades, the commercial technology for separating tantalum from niobium involved the fractional crystallization of potassium heptafluorotantalate away from potassium oxypentafluoroniobate monohydrate, a process that was discovered by Jean Charles Galissard de Marignac in 1866. This method has been supplanted by solvent extraction from fluoride-containing solutions of tantalum.

== Characteristics ==
=== Physical properties ===
Tantalum is dark (blue-gray), dense, ductile, very hard, easily fabricated, and highly conductive of heat and electricity. The metal is highly resistant to corrosion by acids: at temperatures below 150 °C tantalum is almost completely immune to attack by the normally aggressive aqua regia. It can be dissolved with hydrofluoric acid or acidic solutions containing the fluoride ion and sulfur trioxide, as well as with molten potassium hydroxide. Tantalum's high melting point of 3017 °C (boiling point 5458 °C) is exceeded among the elements only by tungsten, rhenium, and osmium for metals, and carbon.

Tantalum exists in two crystalline phases, alpha and beta. The alpha phase is stable at all temperatures up to the melting point and has body-centered cubic structure with lattice constant a = 0.33029 nm at 20 °C. It is relatively ductile, has Knoop hardness 200–400 HN and electrical resistivity 15–60 μΩ⋅cm. The beta phase is hard and brittle; its crystal symmetry is tetragonal (space group P42/mnm, a = 1.0194 nm, c = 0.5313 nm), Knoop hardness is 1000–1300 HN and electrical resistivity is relatively high at 170–210 μΩ⋅cm. The beta phase is metastable and converts to the alpha phase upon heating to 750–775 °C. Bulk tantalum is almost entirely alpha phase, and the beta phase usually exists as thin films obtained by magnetron sputtering, chemical vapor deposition or electrochemical deposition from a eutectic molten salt solution.

α-Ta, viewed along [100] (equivalent with <100> family)

β-Ta, viewed along [001]

=== Isotopes ===
Natural tantalum consists of two stable isotopes: ^{180m}Ta (0.012%) and ^{181}Ta (99.988%). ^{180m}Ta (m denotes a metastable state) is predicted to decay in three ways: isomeric transition to the ground state of ^{180}Ta, beta decay to ^{180}W, or electron capture to ^{180}Hf. However, radioactivity of this nuclear isomer has never been observed, and only a lower limit on its half-life of 2.9×10^{17} years has been set. The ground state of ^{180}Ta has a half-life of only 8 hours. Among primordial nuclides (half-life > 10^{8} years) ^{180m}Ta is the only nuclear isomer and the rarest of all (calculated from the elemental abundance of tantalum and the isotopic abundance of ^{180m}Ta within it).

Tantalum has been examined theoretically as a "salting" material for nuclear weapons (cobalt is the better-known hypothetical salting material). An external shell of tantalum would be irradiated by the intense neutron flux from the weapon, transmuting it into the radioactive isotope ^{182}Ta, whose gamma rays would significantly increase the radioactivity of the fallout for months. Such "salted" weapons are not known to have been built, tested, or used.

Tantalum is used as a target material for spallation by high-energy proton beams for the production of a large number of isotopes including ^{8}Li, ^{80}Rb, and ^{160}Yb.

== Chemical compounds ==
Tantalum forms compounds in oxidation states −3 to +5. Most commonly encountered are oxides of Ta(V), which includes all minerals. The chemical properties of Ta and Nb are very similar. In aqueous media, Ta only exhibits the +5 oxidation state. Like niobium, tantalum is barely soluble in dilute solutions of hydrochloric, sulfuric, nitric and phosphoric acids due to the precipitation of hydrous Ta(V) oxide. In basic media, Ta can be solubilized due to the formation of polyoxotantalate species.

=== Oxides, nitrides, carbides, sulfides ===
Tantalum pentoxide (Ta_{2}O_{5}) is the most important compound from the perspective of applications. Oxides of tantalum in lower oxidation states are numerous, including many defect structures, and are lightly studied or poorly characterized.

Tantalates, compounds containing TaO_{4}^{3−} or TaO_{3}^{−} are numerous. Lithium tantalate (LiTaO_{3}) adopts a perovskite structure. Lanthanum tantalate (LaTaO_{4}) contains isolated TaO_{4}^{3−} tetrahedra.

As in the cases of other refractory metals, the hardest known compounds of tantalum are nitrides and carbides. Tantalum carbide, TaC, like the more commonly used tungsten carbide, is a hard ceramic that is used in cutting tools. Tantalum(III) nitride is used as a thin film insulator in some microelectronic fabrication processes.

The best studied chalcogenide is Tantalum sulfide (TaS_{2}), a layered semiconductor, as seen for other transition metal dichalcogenides. A tantalum-tellurium alloy forms quasicrystals.

=== Halides ===
Tantalum halides span the oxidation states of +5, +4, and +3. Tantalum pentafluoride (TaF_{5}) is a white solid with a melting point of 97.0 °C. The anion TaF_{7}^{2−} is used for its separation from niobium. The chloride TaCl_{5}, which exists as a dimer, is the main reagent in synthesis of new Ta compounds. It hydrolyzes readily to an oxychloride. The lower halides TaX_{4} and TaX_{3}, feature Ta-Ta bonds.

=== Organotantalum compounds ===
Organotantalum compounds include pentamethyltantalum, mixed alkyltantalum chlorides, alkyltantalum hydrides, alkylidene complexes, as well as cyclopentadienyl derivatives of the same. Diverse salts and substituted derivatives are known for the hexacarbonyl [Ta(CO)_{6}]^{−} and related isocyanides.

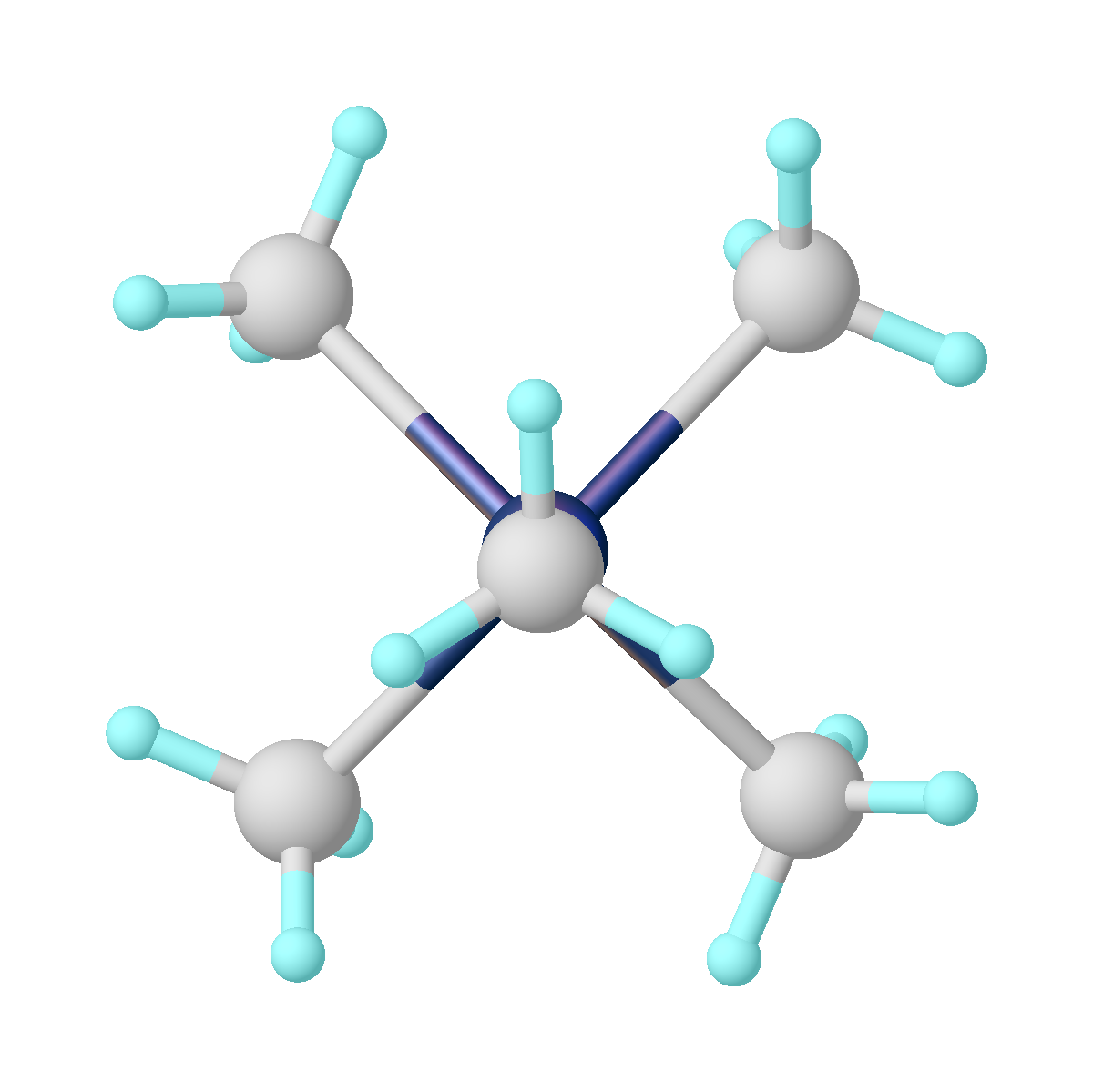
Ta(CH_{3})_{5}.

== Occurrence ==
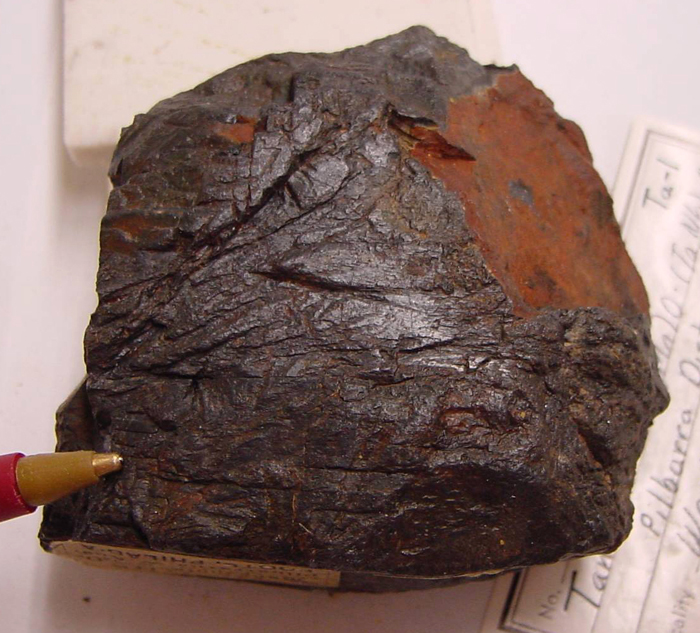
Tantalite, Pilbara district, Australia

Tantalum is estimated to make up about 1 ppm or 2 ppm of the Earth's crust by weight. There are many species of tantalum minerals, only some of which are so far being used by industry as raw materials: tantalite (a series consisting of tantalite-(Fe), tantalite-(Mn), and tantalite-(Mg)), microlite (now a group name), wodginite, euxenite (actually euxenite-(Y)), and polycrase (actually polycrase-(Y)). Tantalite (Fe, Mn)Ta_{2}O_{6} is the most important mineral for tantalum extraction. Tantalite has the same mineral structure as columbite (Fe, Mn)(Ta, Nb)_{2}O_{6}; when there is more tantalum than niobium it is called tantalite and when there is more niobium than tantalum is it called columbite (or niobite). The high density of tantalite and other tantalum containing minerals makes the use of gravitational separation the best method. Other minerals include samarskite and fergusonite.

Tantalum producers in 2015 with Rwanda being the main producer

Australia was the main producer of tantalum prior to the 2010s, with Global Advanced Metals (formerly known as Talison Minerals) being the largest tantalum mining company in that country. They operate two mines in Western Australia, Greenbushes in the southwest and Wodgina in the Pilbara region. The Wodgina mine was reopened in January 2011 after mining at the site was suspended in late 2008 due to the 2008 financial crisis. Less than a year after it reopened, Global Advanced Metals announced that due to again "... softening tantalum demand ...", and other factors, tantalum mining operations were to cease at the end of February 2012. Wodgina produces a primary tantalum concentrate which is further upgraded at the Greenbushes operation before being sold to customers. Whereas the large-scale producers of niobium are in Brazil and Canada, the ore there also yields a small percentage of tantalum. Some other countries such as China, Ethiopia, and Mozambique mine ores with a higher percentage of tantalum, and they produce a significant percentage of the world's output of it. Tantalum is also produced in Thailand and Malaysia as a by-product of the tin mining there. During gravitational separation of the ores from placer deposits, not only is cassiterite (SnO_{2}) found, but a small percentage of tantalite also included. The slag from the tin smelters then contains economically useful amounts of tantalum, which is leached from the slag.

Tantalum producers in 2006 with Australia being the main producer

World tantalum mine production has undergone an important geographic shift since the start of the 21st century when production was predominantly from Australia and Brazil. Beginning in 2007 and through 2014, the major sources of tantalum production from mines dramatically shifted to the Democratic Republic of the Congo, Rwanda, and some other African countries. Future sources of supply of tantalum, in order of estimated size, are being explored in Saudi Arabia, Egypt, Greenland, China, Mozambique, Canada, Australia, the United States, Finland, and Brazil.

== Status as a conflict resource ==
Tantalum is considered a conflict resource. Coltan, the industrial name for a columbite–tantalite mineral from which niobium and tantalum are extracted, can also be found in Central Africa, which is why tantalum is being linked to warfare in the Democratic Republic of the Congo (formerly Zaire). According to an October 23, 2003 United Nations report, the smuggling and exportation of coltan has helped fuel the war in the Congo, a crisis that has resulted in approximately 5.4 million deaths since 1998 – making it the world's deadliest documented conflict since World War II. Ethical questions have been raised about responsible corporate behavior, human rights, and endangering wildlife, due to the exploitation of resources such as coltan in the armed conflict regions of the Congo Basin. The United States Geological Survey reports in its yearbook that this region produced a little less than 1% of the world's tantalum output in 2002–2006, peaking at 10% in 2000 and 2008. USGS data published in January 2021 indicated that close to 40% of the world's tantalum mine production came from the Democratic Republic of the Congo, with another 18% coming from neighboring Rwanda and Burundi.

== Production and fabrication ==
Tantalum production

Time trend of tantalum production until 2012

The ideal tantalum ores is tantalite, but significant amounts are obtained from columbite, a niobium ore. Thus, these ores, aside from the gangue, consist of mixtures of tantalum and niobium oxides. The refining of tantalum from this mixture ores is one of the most demanding separation processes in industrial metallurgy. The chief problem is that not only do the ores contain both metals, but more significantly the chemical properties of Ta and Nb are extremely similar (a comparable challenge exists for zirconium and hafnium). A large number of procedures have been developed to address this challenge. The chief approach is hydrometallurgy: dissolution of the concentrated ore followed by selective extraction of the Ta species from this water-based solution. The main variables, which depend on local conditions such Ta/Nb ratio or the ore as well as environmental regulations are the lixiviant (medium for dissolving the Nb/Ta) and the solvent that extracts the tantalum. Typical lixiviants are hydrofluoric acid together with sulfuric acid or hydrochloric acid. This step allows the tantalum and niobium to be separated from the various non-metallic impurities (gangue) in the rock. Although Ta occurs as various minerals, it is conveniently represented as the pentoxide, since most oxides of tantalum(V) behave similarly under these conditions. A simplified equation for its extraction is thus:

Ta_{2}O_{5} + 14 HF → 2 H_{2}[TaF_{7}] + 5 H_{2}O

Other relevant species include oxyfluoride H_{2}[TaOF_{5}] and the related H_{2}[NbF_{7}], H[NbF_{6}] and H_{2}[NbOF_{7}]. liquid-liquid extraction into organic solvents, such as cyclohexanone, octanol, and methyl isobutyl ketone. This simple procedure allows the removal of most metal-containing impurities (e.g. iron, manganese, titanium, zirconium), which remain in the aqueous phase in the form of their fluorides and other complexes. Separation of the tantalum from niobium is then achieved by lowering the ionic strength of the acid mixture, which causes the niobium to dissolve in the aqueous phase. It is proposed that oxyfluoride H_{2}[NbOF_{5}] is formed under these conditions. Subsequent to removal of the niobium, the solution of purified H_{2}[TaF_{7}] is neutralised with aqueous ammonia to precipitate hydrated tantalum oxide as a solid, which can be calcined to tantalum pentoxide (Ta_{2}O_{5}).

Instead of hydrolysis, the H_{2}[TaF_{7}] can be treated with potassium fluoride to produce potassium heptafluorotantalate:

H_{2}[TaF_{7}] + 2 KF → K_{2}[TaF_{7}] + 2 HF

Unlike H_{2}[TaF_{7}], the potassium salt is readily crystallized and handled as a solid.

K_{2}[TaF_{7}] can be converted to metallic tantalum by reduction with sodium, at approximately 800 °C in molten salt.

K_{2}[TaF_{7}] + 5 Na → Ta + 5 NaF + 2 KF

In an older method, called the Marignac process, the mixture of H_{2}[TaF_{7}] and H_{2}[NbOF_{5}] was converted to a mixture of K_{2}[TaF_{7}] and K_{2}[NbOF_{5}], which was then separated by fractional crystallization, exploiting their different water solubilities.

=== Electrolysis ===
Tantalum can also be refined by electrolysis, using a modified version of the Hall–Héroult process. Instead of requiring the input oxide and output metal to be in liquid form, tantalum electrolysis operates on non-liquid powdered oxides. The initial discovery came in 1997 when Cambridge University researchers immersed small samples of certain oxides in baths of molten salt and reduced the oxide with electric current. The cathode uses powdered metal oxide. The anode is made of carbon. The molten salt at 1,000 °C (1,830 °F) is the electrolyte. The first refinery has enough capacity to supply 3–4% of annual global demand.

=== Fabrication and metalworking ===
All welding of tantalum must be done in an inert atmosphere of argon or helium in order to shield it from contamination with atmospheric gases. Tantalum is not solderable. Grinding tantalum is difficult, especially so for annealed tantalum. In the annealed condition, tantalum is extremely ductile and can be readily formed as metal sheets.

== Applications ==
=== Electronics ===
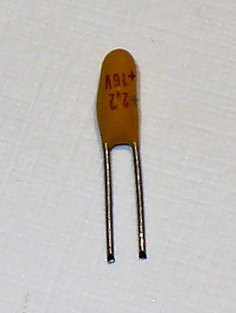
Tantalum electrolytic capacitor

The major use for tantalum, as the metal powder, is in the production of electronic components, mainly capacitors and some high-power resistors. Tantalum electrolytic capacitors exploit the tendency of tantalum to form a protective oxide surface layer, using tantalum powder, pressed into a pellet shape, as one "plate" of the capacitor, the oxide as the dielectric, and an electrolytic solution or conductive solid as the other "plate". Because the dielectric layer can be very thin (thinner than the similar layer in, for instance, an aluminium electrolytic capacitor), a high capacitance can be achieved in a small volume. Because of the size and weight advantages, tantalum capacitors are attractive for portable telephones, personal computers, automotive electronics and cameras.

=== Alloys ===
Tantalum is also used to produce a variety of alloys that have high melting points, strength, and ductility. Alloyed with other metals, it is also used in making carbide tools for metalworking equipment and in the production of superalloys for jet engine components, chemical process equipment, nuclear reactors, missile parts, heat exchangers, tanks, and vessels. Because of its ductility, tantalum can be drawn into fine wires or filaments, which are used for evaporating metals such as aluminium.

Tantalum is inert against most acids except hydrofluoric acid and hot sulfuric acid, and hot alkaline solutions also cause tantalum to corrode. This property makes it a useful metal for chemical reaction vessels and pipes for corrosive liquids. Heat exchanging coils for the steam heating of hydrochloric acid are made from tantalum. Tantalum was extensively used in the production of ultra high frequency electron tubes for radio transmitters. Tantalum is capable of capturing oxygen and nitrogen by forming nitrides and oxides and therefore helped to sustain the high vacuum needed for the tubes when used for internal parts such as grids and plates.

=== Surgical uses ===
Tantalum is widely used in surgery because of two unique characteristics. Tantalum's hardness and ductility is useful in making sharp, durable surgical instruments and also for monofilament sutures. However, a completely unrelated use for tantalum in surgery arises from its unique ability to form a lasting and durable structural bond with human hard tissue, making it uniquely useful for bone and dental implants. Tantalum coatings are increasingly used in the construction of complex tantalum-coated titanium surgical implants due to the tantalum plating's ability to form a strong and biologically stable bond to hard tissue. An incidental consequence of its use for durable surgical implants is that tantalum implants are considered to be acceptable for patients undergoing MRI procedures because tantalum is a non-ferrous, non-magnetic metal.

=== Other uses ===
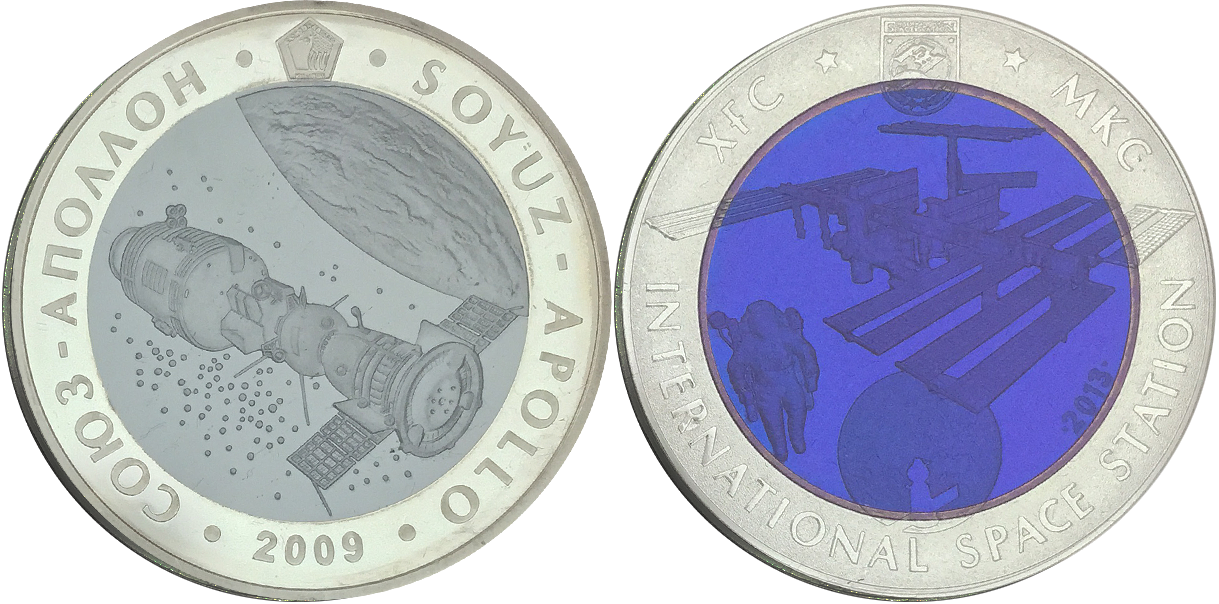
Bimetallic coins minted by the Bank of Kazakhstan with silver ring and tantalum center. These two feature the Apollo–Soyuz and the International Space Station

Tantalum was used by NASA to shield components of spacecraft, such as Voyager 1 and Voyager 2, from radiation. The high melting point and oxidation resistance led to the use of the metal in the production of vacuum furnace parts. Tantalum is extremely inert and is therefore formed into a variety of corrosion resistant parts, such as thermowells, valve bodies, and tantalum fasteners. Due to its high density, shaped charge and explosively formed penetrator liners have been constructed from tantalum. Tantalum greatly increases the armor penetration capabilities of a shaped charge due to its high density and high melting point. It is also occasionally used in precious watches e.g. from Audemars Piguet, F. P. Journe, Hublot, Montblanc, Omega, and Panerai. Tantalum oxide is used to make special high refractive index glass for camera lenses. Spherical tantalum powder, produced by atomizing molten tantalum using gas or liquid, is commonly used in additive manufacturing due to its uniform shape, excellent flowability, and high melting point.

== Environmental issues ==
Tantalum receives far less attention in the environmental field than it does in other geosciences. Upper Crust Concentration (UCC) and the Nb/Ta ratio in the upper crust and in minerals are available because these measurements are useful as a geochemical tool. The latest value for upper crust concentration is 0.92 ppm, and the Nb/Ta(w/w) ratio stands at 12.7.

Little data is available on tantalum concentrations in the different environmental compartments, especially in natural waters where reliable estimates of 'dissolved' tantalum concentrations in seawater and freshwaters have not even been produced. Some values on dissolved concentrations in oceans have been published, but they are contradictory. Values in freshwaters fare little better, but, in all cases, they are probably below 1 ng dm^{−3}, since 'dissolved' concentrations in natural waters are well below most current analytical capabilities. Analysis requires pre-concentration procedures that, for the moment, do not give consistent results. And in any case, tantalum appears to be present in natural waters mostly as particulate matter rather than dissolved.

Values for concentrations in soils, bed sediments and atmospheric aerosols are easier to come by. Values in soils are close to 1 ppm and thus to UCC values. This indicates detrital origin. For atmospheric aerosols the values available are scattered and limited. When tantalum enrichment is observed, it is probably due to loss of more water-soluble elements in aerosols in the clouds.

Pollution linked to human use of the element has not been detected. Tantalum appears to be a very conservative element in biogeochemical terms, but its cycling and reactivity are still not fully understood.

== Precautions ==
Compounds containing tantalum are rarely encountered in the laboratory. The metal is highly biocompatible and is used for body implants and coatings, therefore attention may be focused on other elements or the physical nature of the chemical compound.

People can be exposed to tantalum in the workplace by breathing it in, skin contact, or eye contact. The Occupational Safety and Health Administration (OSHA) has set the legal limit (permissible exposure limit) for tantalum exposure in the workplace as 5 mg/m^{3} over an 8-hour workday. The National Institute for Occupational Safety and Health (NIOSH) has set a recommended exposure limit (REL) of 5 mg/m^{3} over an 8-hour workday and a short-term limit of 10 mg/m^{3}. There is a paradox arising because of tantalum's ability to form a strong and permanent bond with bone tissue: at levels of 2500 mg/m^{3}, tantalum dust becomes immediately dangerous to life and health if tantalum dust accidentally bonds with the wrong tissue.
