= Columbite =

Mineral group

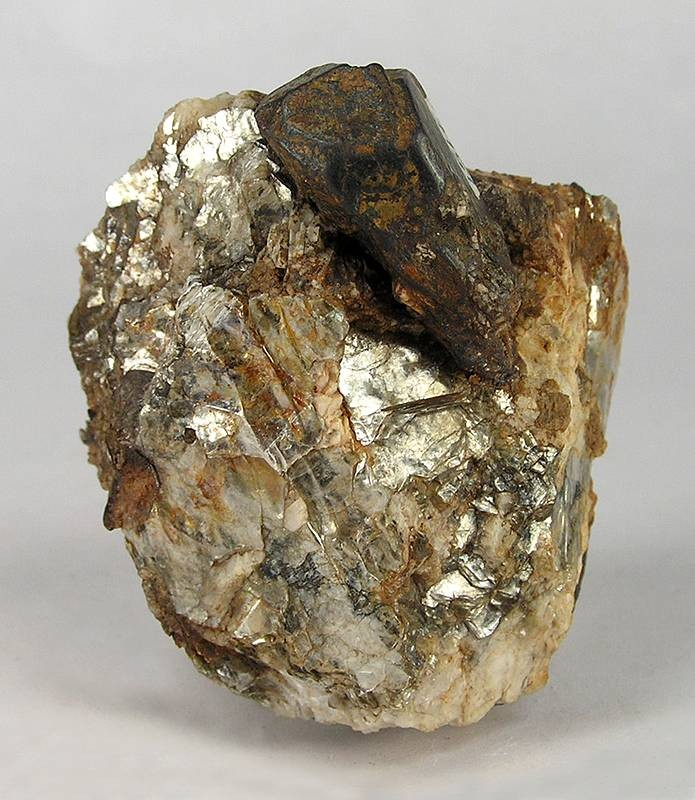

General
- Category: Oxide minerals
- Formula: (Fe^{II},Mn^{II})Nb_{2}O_{6}, or in oxide formula (Fe^{II},Mn^{II})O·Nb_{2}O_{5}
- IMA symbol: Clb
- Strunz classification: 4.DB.35
- Crystal system: Orthorhombic
- Crystal class: Dipyramidal (mmm); H-M symbol: (2/m 2/m 2/m)
- Space group: Pbcn

Identification
- Color: Black, brownish black.
- Crystal habit: Massive – granular – common texture observed in granite and other igneous rock; Striated – parallel lines on crystal surface or cleavage face.
- Cleavage: [010] Distinct
- Fracture: Sub-conchoidal: fractures developed in brittle materials characterized by semi-curving surfaces.
- Mohs scale hardness: 6
- Luster: Sub-metallic
- Streak: Blackish brown
- Specific gravity: 5.3–7.3
- Optical properties: Biaxial (+), b = 2.29–2.4
- Other characteristics: Radioactive, non-fluorescent.

Columbite, also called niobite, niobite-tantalite and columbate, with a general chemical formula of (Fe^{II},Mn^{II})Nb_{2}O_{6}, is a black mineral group that is an ore of niobium. It has a submetallic luster, a high density, and is a niobate of iron and manganese. Niobite has many applications in aerospace, construction and the medical industry. Dating columbite minerals is primarily completed by uranium–lead dating, a slow process.

Columbite has the same composition and crystal symmetry (orthorhombic) as tantalite. In fact, the two are often grouped together as a semi-singular mineral series called columbite-tantalite or coltan in many mineral guides. However, tantalite has a much greater specific gravity than columbite, more than 8.0 compared to columbite's 5.2. The formation of columbite depends on the concentrations of metals present that affect the crystalline structure of the mineral and the environmental impact.

Columbite is a polymorph of tapiolite; they have the same chemical composition but different crystal symmetry: orthorhombic for columbite and tetragonal for tapiolite. The largest documented single crystal of columbite consisted of plates 6 mm (0.24 in) thick measuring 76 cm × 61 cm (30 in × 24 in).

Columbite contains varying amounts of thorium and uranium, making it radioactive. Coltan, a tantalum dominate species of columbite, is often mined by artisan and small scale miners with risks to the environment and human health due to unregulated working conditions.

== History and etymology ==
This mineral group was first found in Haddam, Connecticut, in the United States. The occurrence of columbite in the United States was made known on April 13, 1905, through the publication of research into the composition of an older specimen, presumably stemming from John Winthrop (1606–1676), first Governor of the Connecticut Colony and avid mineral collector. Amidst 600 other samples, the relevant specimen had been donated by the Governor's namesake and grandson, John Winthrop (1681–1747) to Hans Sloane, President of the Royal Society of London, upon Winthrop's becoming a Fellow of the Royal Society in 1737.

In 1801, Charles Hatchett had discovered the element niobium in the same specimen, which he had named columbium in honour of explorer Christopher Columbus.

== Columbite species ==
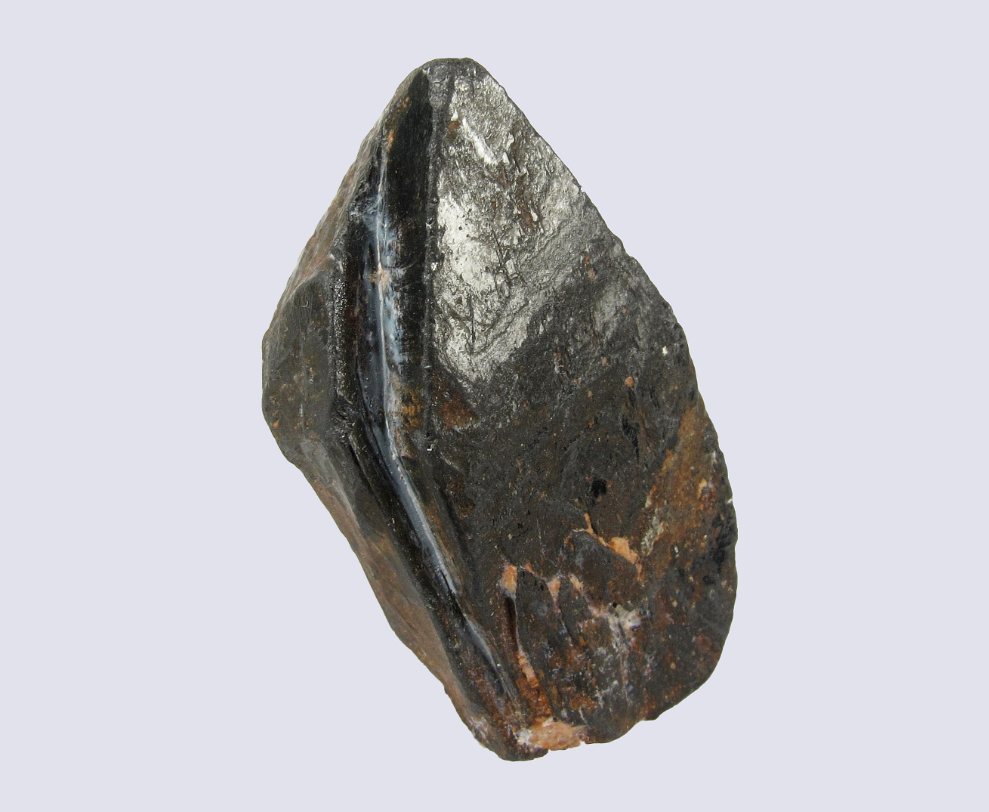
Yttrocolumbite; a species of columbite

Columbite forms opaque crystals that are black to dark brown in colour. The formation of the crystals vary based on the species present.

Columbite forms a series with the tantalum-dominant analogue ferrotantalite and the manganese-dominant analogue manganocolumbite. Manganocolumbite has a chemical formula of (Mn, Fe)(Nb, Ta)_{2}O_{6}, often with small concentrations of tantalum and iron. Manganocolumbite is often found in pegmatites, course-grained igneous rocks.

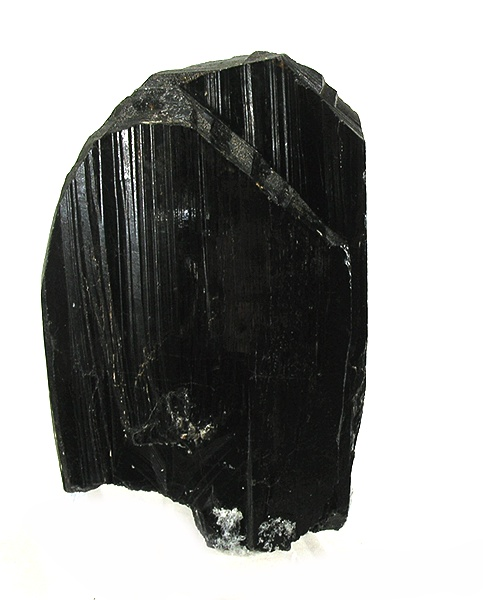
Ferrocolumbite; a species of columbite

The iron-rich member of the columbite group is ferrocolumbite, FeNb_{2}O_{6}, and small concentrations of tin and tungsten may be present. This species of columbite is often found in pegmatites as course-grained igneous rocks.

Yttrocolumbite is the yttrium-rich columbite with the formula (Y,U,Fe)(Nb,Ta)O_{4}, is a radioactive mineral found in Mozambique. This mineral forms due to pegmatites and rare-metal granites.

== Structure ==
Columbite atoms form an octahedral structure where niobium or tantalum atoms surround an oxygen atom. Overall, Columbite forms orthorhombic crystals which give approximate lengths of the crystal axes as a ≈ 14.27, b ≈ 5.73, and c ≈ 5.06 Å. Different columbite species such as manganocolumbite or ferrocolumbite can change the lengths of the crystal axes.

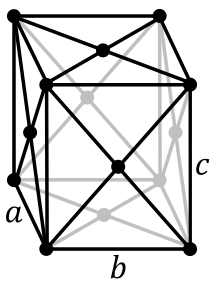
Face centered crystal structure of columbite (orthorhombic)

Since columbite can form species with other minerals, the physical properties of the mineral can change. When ferrocolumbite is introduced to heat, an equal expansion of the 'a' and 'b' axis occurs. In addition, due to the size of the ions and the overall structure, ferrocolumbite is more compressible than manganocolumbite. When manganocolumbite is introduced to heat, an expansion of the 'a' axis occurs resulting in an uneven change to the structure.

== Applications ==
When niobite is extracted from columbite, in the ore refining process, applications can be observed in the aerospace, construction, and medical industry. In the aerospace industry, super alloys can be created. Super alloys from niobite create a low mass, and high resistance material often used in spacecraft. In construction, some high-strength low-alloy (HSLA) steel is created from niobite. In addition, niobite extracted from columbite can be used to create electronic components used in medical equipment such as magnetic resonance imaging (MRI) and nuclear magnetic resonance (NMR).

== Formation ==
Columbite is often found in pegmatite and alluvial deposits, as well as granitic rocks. Columbite minerals are mainly composed of magnesium, iron, niobium, and tantalum where trace amounts of tin, titanium, and scandium have been observed. The overall composition of columbite influences the crystalline structure resulting in different formation processes. Currently, there are two prominent theories for the formation of columbite. One theory was developed due to a strong attraction of niobium and tantalum, within columbite, to silicate melts found in the earth's crust or mantle. In addition, the presence of magma forms columbite by undergoing two crystallization processes. The first crystallization process creates a niobium core and the second crystallization process creates a tantalum rim. This theory is prominent due to the texture of the mineral during the fluid stage, and the magmatic fractional crystallization that occurs during formation. Another prominent theory of the formation of niobium and tantalum, in Columbite minerals, occurs due to hydrothermal fluids. This theory suggests that hydrothermal fluids interact with columbite during formation and as a result irregular crystals are formed.

It is possible that both theories work in conjunction with one another to form columbite minerals as well as different species of columbite such as mangancolumbite, ferrocolumbite, and yttrocolumbite.

== Environmental impact ==
Columbite minerals have the potential to be radioactive due to trace amounts of uranium and thorium. Radioactive minerals are unstable and emit ionising radiation which causes negative impacts to the environment and human health. Each country has different laws regarding the transportation of radioactive material.

When mining columbite, contamination of ground and surface water are a concern due to the presence of heavy metals in waste rock. In addition, waste rock can lead to acid mine drainage which can affect ground and surface water. To obtain pure columbite, a large quantity of waste rock is produced, leading to negative impacts to the surrounding environment.

During the extraction of niobite or tantalum from columbite, strong acids at high temperatures are used that have negative impacts to the environment. Hydrofluoric acid and sulfuric acid are used in the ore refining processes between temperatures of 250–300 °C. These acids can cause soil acidification, air pollution, and water pollution that, in turn, affects ecosystems. Current technology, in the ore refining of columbite, is not selective which leads to impurities present in refined columbite samples. To remove impurities, a greater concentration of acid is required, leading to a greater potential of environmental hazards.

== Dating ==
There are three applications to dating columbite group minerals each with advantages and disadvantages. These methods are uranium lead (U-Pb) dating, laser ablation inductively coupled plasma mass spectrometry (LA-ICP-MS), and secondary ion mass spectrometry (SIMS). The U-Pb method can determine the location and age of a columbite mineral group by the U/Pb ratio. This method is often paired with isotope dilution-thermal ionization mass spectrometry (ID-TIMS) to increase precision. The LA-ICP-MS method is used in situ to date columbite-tantalite minerals with less than five percent error on the isotopic ratio of uranium and lead. The SIMS method has a high spatial resolution and accuracy in measuring lead isotopes in columbite minerals. The LA-ICP-MS and SIMS method are not commonly used due to the lack of certified reference material.

== Artisanal and small-scale mining ==
Artisanal and small-scale mining provides jobs for millions of people but typically has negative impacts to human health and the environment. This type of mining is executed by small groups of people, typically under a larger mining cooperation, with simple extraction equipment. This simple extraction equipment can include pickaxes, shovels, basins, and minimal heavy machinery. Coltan, the tantalum dominant species of columbite, is often mined artisanally due to its vast applications in electronics. Artisanal and small-scale mining of materials are common in regions such as Africa, Asia, Oceania, Central American, and South America. While this type of mining is important for local economies and livelihood, it is often unregulated, which leads to illegal mining and unsafe working conditions. Due to unregulated conditions, the mistreatment of artisanal miners, violence, illegal trading, and sometimes child labour can occur. In addition, long term health effects are common when mining coltan, due to the presence of radioactive material within the mineral. In countries such as Sierra Leone, Liberia, and the Democratic Republic of the Congo, lucrative trading of minerals, such as coltan, has occurred due to lack of state control of artisanal and small-scale mining in the region.

== See also ==
- List of minerals
