= Tantalite =

Tantalum ore

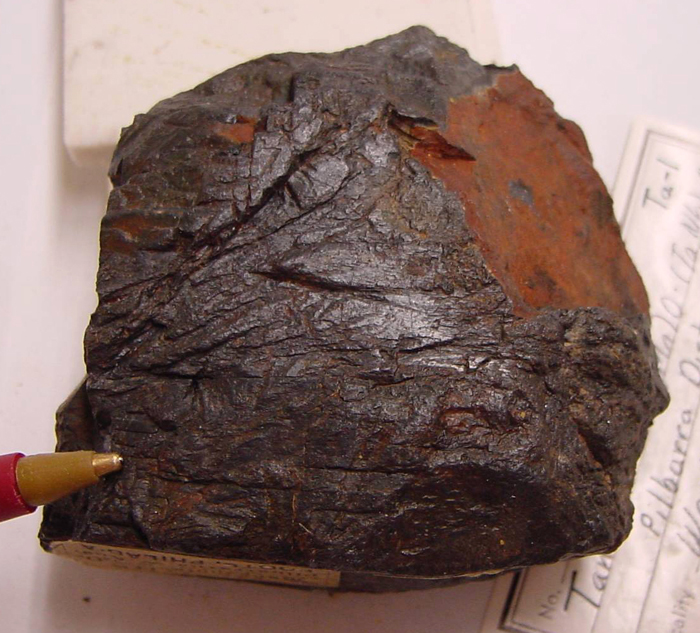
- Tantalite, Pilbara district, Australia

General
- Category: Oxide minerals
- Formula: (Fe,Mn)Ta_{2}O_{6}
- IMA symbol: Ttl
- Strunz classification: 4.DB.35
- Crystal system: Orthorhombic
- Crystal class: Dipyramidal (mmm); H-M symbol: (2/m 2/m 2/m)
- Space group: Pbcn (no. 60)

Identification
- Color: Dark black, iron-black to dark brown, reddish brown
- Cleavage: Good in one direction
- Fracture: Subconchoidal
- Mohs scale hardness: 6–6.5
- Luster: Submetallic to almost resinous
- Streak: Brownish-red to black
- Specific gravity: 8.0+

The mineral group tantalite [(Fe, Mn)Ta_{2}O_{6}] is the primary source of the chemical element tantalum, a corrosion (heat and acid) resistant metal. It is chemically similar to columbite, and the two are often grouped together as a semi-singular mineral called coltan or "columbite-tantalite" in many mineral guides. However, tantalite has a much greater specific gravity than columbite (8.0+ compared to columbite's 5.2). Iron-rich tantalite is the mineral tantalite-(Fe) or ferrotantalite and manganese-rich is tantalite-(Mn) or manganotantalite.

Tantalite is also very close to tapiolite. Those minerals have the same chemical composition, but different crystal symmetry: orthorhombic for tantalite and tetragonal for tapiolite.

Tantalite is black to brown in both color and streak. Manganese-rich tantalites can be brown and translucent.

== Occurrence ==
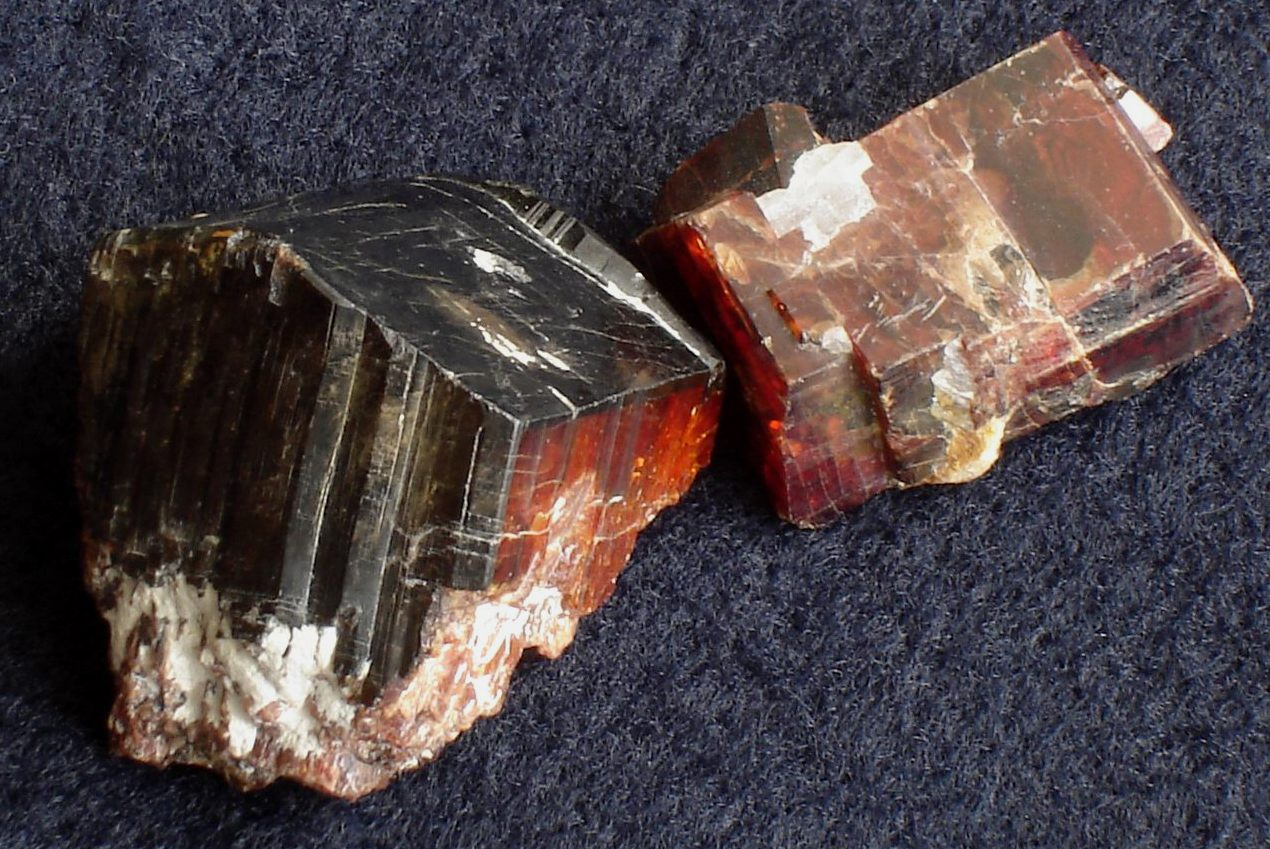
Manganotantalite from Alto do Giz, RN, Brazil

Tantalite occurs in granitic pegmatites that are rich in rare-elements, and in placer deposits derived from such rocks. It has been found in Australia, Brazil, Canada, Colombia (Guainía and Vichada), Egypt, northern Europe, Madagascar, Namibia, Nigeria, Rwanda, The Democratic Republic of Congo, the United States (California, Colorado, Maine, and Virginia), and Zimbabwe. Brazil has the world's largest reserve of tantalite (52.1%).

== Applications ==
The tantalum metal extracted from tantalite is used in alloys for strength and higher melting points, in glass to increase the index of refraction, and in surgical steel, as it is non-reactive and non-irritating to body tissues. Much like glass, it is not suitable for use in hydrofluoric acid and strong hot alkali applications.

== Sustainability ==
The mining of tantalite causes many environmental and social problems in the Democratic Republic of Congo.

== See also ==
- Coltan mining and ethics
