= Nova Dies BVI IBC =

British Virgin Islands international business company

Nova Dies is a British Virgin Islands (BVI) international business company (IBC) that functions as a business shell covering a consortium of international trusts and other asset managers investing in mining and shipping of natural resources. Its shares are controlled through a complex trust scheme and it is managed through a Management Company that is a subsidiary of Nova Dies itself. It has been speculated that Nova Dies scheme mostly covers investments of Colombian, Dutch, Greek and Congolese mining and shipping interests.

Most of Nova Dies non-financial operations concern imports of coltan and other minerals through the sea route from Dar es Salaam (Tanzania)-Port of Piraeus. In Piraeus, the mineral shipments are unloaded and distributed throughout Eastern Europe by a network of trans-Balkan land routes coordinated from Piraeus.

Its official seat exists in the offshore haven of the Island of Tortola in British Virgin Islands, but its business core is located in Piraeus Greece. There, Nova Dies retains a Customs and Transportation Management Representative Office.

Nova Dies also operates a secondary Cargo Management Office in the Port of Rotterdam Free Zone (Netherlands), a Financial Management Office in Nicosia (Cyprus) and an Investment Management Office in Madeira International Off-Shore Business Centre (Portugal).

A key characteristic of Nova Dies is that it employs no operational or managerial staff. It is rather managed by a network of independent agents, lawyers, trustees and representatives. This network further intermediates between the company and numerous independent contractors hired for executing the actual corporate operations. Furthermore, Nova Dies does not retain any assets itself, as it only functions as a management company performing investments on behalf of its clients, exercising the ownership and management rights of other corporate and trust schemes on their own corporate and financial assets and administrating networks of third party affiliated companies.

== History ==
The company was founded in 2010 in the offshore haven of the Island of Tortola in British Virgin Islands

== Business activities ==
Nova Dies is primarily occupied with second-tier management contracts in the mining industry. It is specialised in the financial, investment and transportation network management of first-tier managing companies involved into the operational, logistics and financial management of coltan ore and rare earths mines.

The assets-under-management of Nova Dies include several coltan mines in Eastern Colombia (Guainía Region) and mixed coltan-cassiterite-wolframite mines in the Democratic Republic of Congo (North Kivu). Nova Dies is not actually itself involved in the operations management of the mines; it is rather handling the transportation of the unprocessed ore from the mining locations to processing plants in Central and Eastern Europe and China and it hires it to mineral traffickers and transporters. Moreover, it provides the mining and transportation companies with funding, trading intermediation, customs facilitation, bulk management, wholesale services, forward contracts representation, hedging and currency swap services, operating revolving, layering and investment exchange funding structures. Nova Dies also provides transnational transactions facilitation and operates mutual co-funding and funding exchange structures.

== Criticism and controversy ==
The main criticism against Nova Dies concerns three separate issues:

1. First, its complex and obscure business model provides coltan and other minerals smugglers with a vital transportation network, in order to distribute the product. Thus, it integrates the minerals smuggling network into the legal minerals wholesale market. This way, it also provides smugglers with great profit opportunities that would not be available within the illegal market.
2. Second, Nova Dies functions as a bridge between illegal mineral trafficking and potential money laundering. Not only, money from obscure sources are transformed into legitimate financial instruments, through the minerals future contracts, or even commodities (in the form of stockpiles), but illegal minerals mining also finds significant funding that would not be available without a legitimate intermediary established in the developed world.
3. Third, a great part of the minerals distributed through NOVA DIES network may derive from illegal, artisanal and environment harming sources. As the network connects these activities with funding and final consumers, illegal mining is encouraged. Given into consideration that illegal mining is considered both as a great environmental danger for specific areas such as Central Africa and as a long term threat for economic growth in the local economies (as the exports concern raw material and local minerals processing is undermined).

Nova Dies has been named as a “mineral laundering service” (in correspondence with “money laundering”), a term used to denote its role as a legitimizer of illegal minerals and especially coltan. The Democratic Republic of Congo Government has forbidden the export of raw coltan and other minerals, in order to reinforce local processing industry. Furthermore, the activities of Nova Dies along with those of other mineral traffickers are deemed to support the prolonged armed conflict in the Democratic Republic of the Congo (DRC) and Central Africa in general.

== DRC Coltan trafficking and blood minerals trading ==
As of 2013, the Company held a large stockpile of coltan ore, formed during the turbulent months of March 23 Movement and the related anarchy caused in North Kivu, Democratic Republic of the Congo. Nova Dies, assumed as a “blood minerals” speculator, took full advantage of the Congolese civil conflict in order to collect from rebel-controlled areas immense quantities of coltan, mined (frequently using child labor) and stockpiled through the whole 2004-2013 decade of the ongoing North Kivu civil conflict.

In April 2014, a raw coltan cargo of questionable origin was arrested in Piraeus Port from local custom authorities. Although the cargo was officially shipped through a Cypriot intermediary company, later evidence later linked it with Nova Dies network and illegal stockpile. However, the cargo in the meanwhile was temporarily released and then transported to the Republic of Macedonia before its true origin could be affirmed. A relevant incident also happened in July 2014 in Piraeus, when a coltan cargo was first arrested, then released as legitimate and finally proven –after a specific procedure of sample identification- as mined from a conflict zone in DRC; however, at the time of the discovery, the main cargo had already disappeared.

== Colombian drug cartels and coltan smuggling from the Amazon ==
In 2013, Nova Dies affiliates were connected with incidents of coltan imports in Europe from illegal mines in Colombian Amazon areas and the Guaviare River, controlled by local drug cartels. The company, also partially belonging to Colombian interests, has been investigated for assisting Colombian narco-traffickers to legitimize drug-related money by complex commodities derivatives multinational transactions along with layering structures.
