= Tantalum capacitor =

Type of electrolytic capacitor

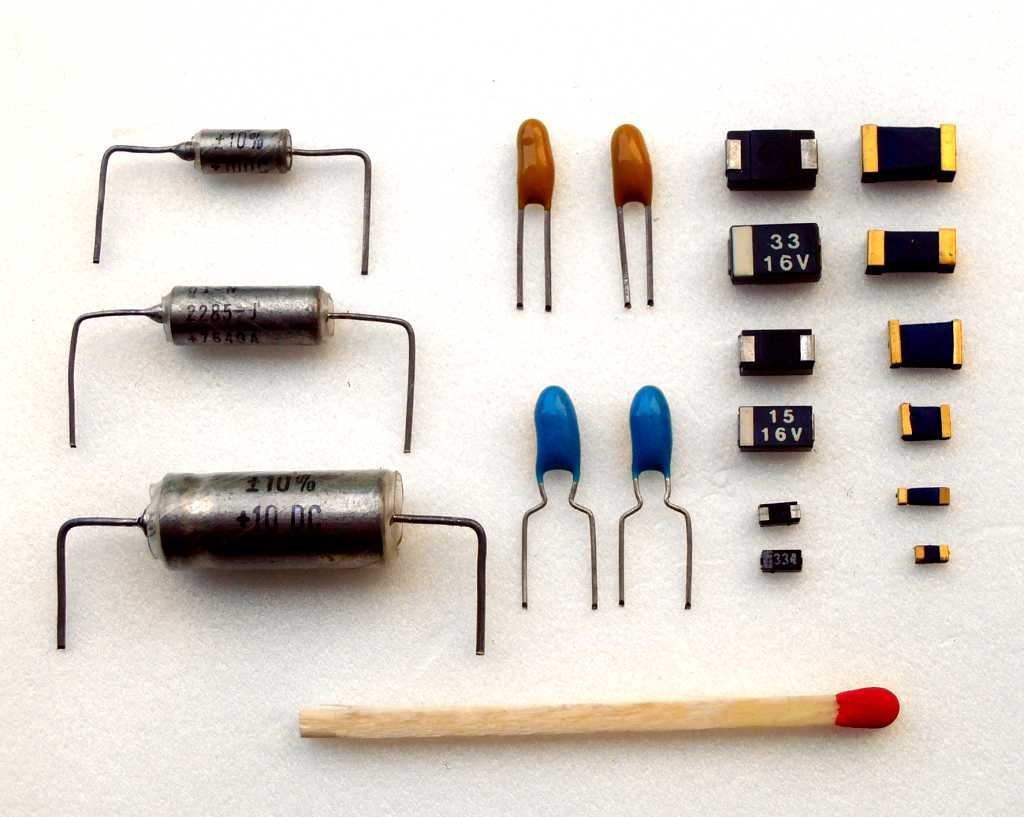
Tantalum capacitors in different styles: axial, radial and SMD-chip versions (size comparison with a match)

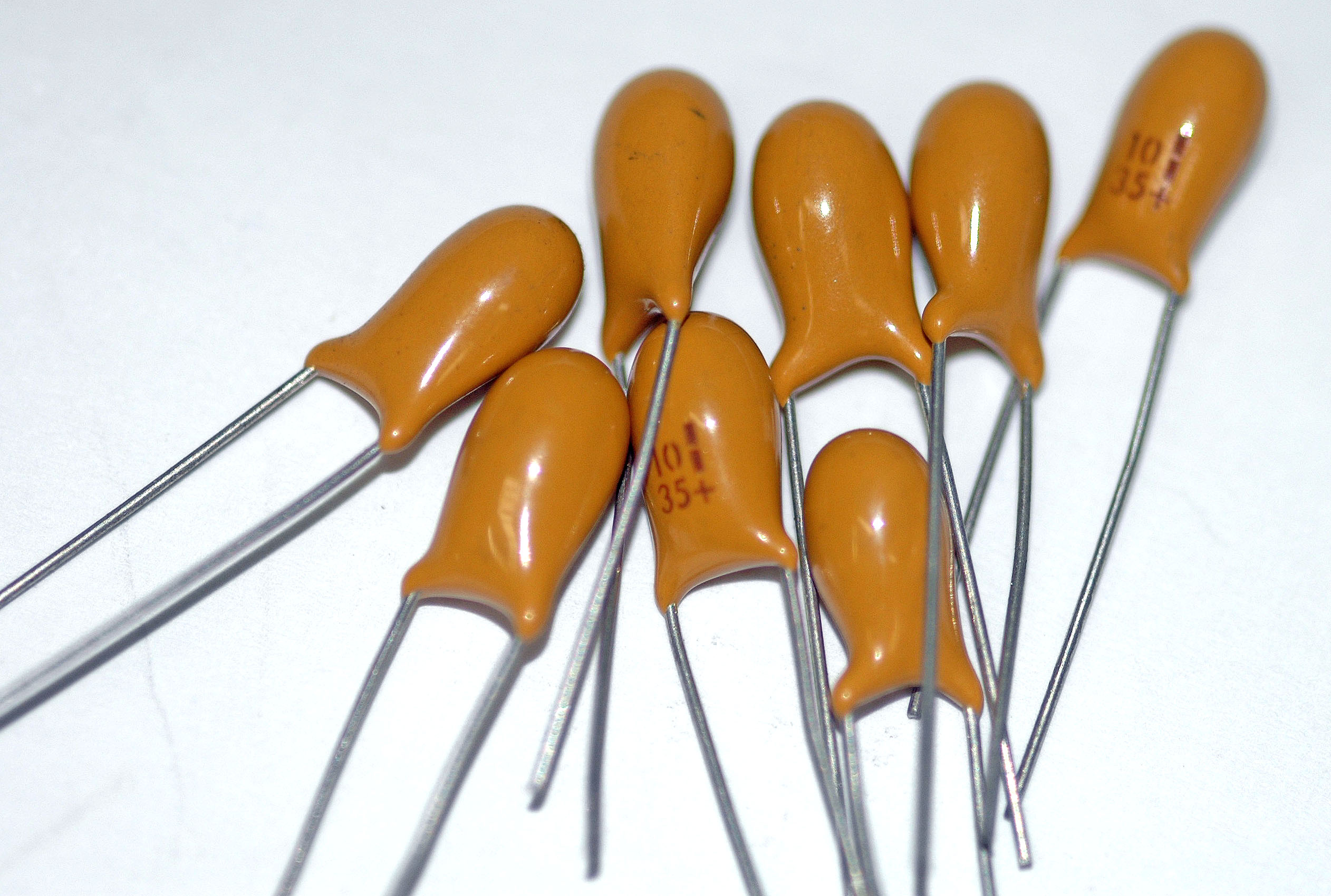
10 μF 30 VDC-rated tantalum capacitors, solid electrolyte epoxy-dipped style.

A tantalum electrolytic capacitor is an electrolytic capacitor, a passive component of electronic circuits. It consists of a pellet of porous tantalum metal as an anode, covered by an insulating oxide layer that forms the dielectric, surrounded by liquid or solid electrolyte as a cathode. The tantalum capacitor, because of its very thin and relatively high permittivity dielectric layer, distinguishes itself from other conventional and electrolytic capacitors in having high capacitance per volume (high volumetric efficiency) and lower weight.

Tantalum is a conflict resource. Tantalum electrolytic capacitors are considerably more expensive than comparable aluminum electrolytic capacitors.

Tantalum capacitors are inherently polarized components. Applying a reverse voltage can destroy the capacitor. Non-polar or bipolar tantalum capacitors are made by effectively connecting two polarized capacitors in series, with the anodes oriented in opposite directions.

Tantalum electrolytic capacitors are extensively used in electronic devices that require stable capacitance, low leakage current, and where reliability is crucial. Due to its reliability, durability and performance under extreme conditions, it is used in medical equipment, aerospace and military applications. Other applications include power supply units, measuring instruments, telecommunications equipment, and computer peripherals.

== Basic information ==
=== Basic principle ===
Basic principle of the anodic oxidation, in which, by applying a voltage with a current source, an oxide layer is formed on a metallic anode

Electrolytic capacitors use a chemical feature of some special metals, historically called valve metals, which can form an insulating oxide layer. Applying a positive voltage to the tantalum anode material in an electrolytic bath forms an oxide barrier layer with a thickness proportional to the applied voltage. This oxide layer serves as the dielectric in an electrolytic capacitor. The properties of this oxide layer are compared with those of a niobium electrolytic capacitor oxide layer in the following table:

Characteristics of the different oxide layers in tantalum and niobium electrolytic capacitors
| Anode- material | Dielectric | Relative permittivity | Oxide structure | Breakdown voltage (V/μm) | Dielectric layer thickness (nm/V) |
|---|---|---|---|---|---|
| Tantalum | Tantalum pentoxide, Ta_{2}O_{5} | 27 | Amorphous | 625 | 1.7 |
| Niobium or Niobium oxide | Niobium pentoxide, Nb_{2}O_{5} | 41 | Amorphous | 400 | 2.5 |

After forming a dielectric oxide on the rough anode structures, a cathode is needed. An electrolyte acts as the cathode of electrolytic capacitors. There are many different electrolytes in use. Generally, the electrolytes will be distinguished into two species, non-solid and solid electrolytes. Non-solid electrolytes are a liquid medium whose conductivity is ionic. The oxide layer may be destroyed if the polarity of the applied voltage is reversed.

A dielectric material is placed between two conducting plates (electrodes), each of area A and with a separation of d.

Every electrolytic capacitor in principle forms a plate capacitor whose capacitance is greater the larger the electrode area, A, and the permittivity, ε, are and the thinner the thickness, d, of the dielectric is.

$$C = \varepsilon \cdot \frac{A}{d}$$

The dielectric thickness of electrolytic capacitors is very thin, in the range of nanometers per volt. Despite this, the dielectric strengths of these oxide layers are quite high. Thus, tantalum capacitors can achieve a high volumetric capacitance compared to other capacitor types.

All etched or sintered anodes have a much larger total surface area compared to a smooth surface of the same overall dimensions. This surface area increase boosts the capacitance value by a factor of up to 200 (depending on the rated voltage) for solid tantalum electrolytic capacitors.

The volume of an electrolytic capacitor is defined by the product of capacitance and voltage, the so-called CV-volume. However, in comparing the permittivities of different oxide materials, it is seen that tantalum pentoxide has an approximately 3 times higher permittivity than aluminum oxide. Tantalum electrolytic capacitors of a given CV value can therefore be smaller than aluminum electrolytic capacitors.

=== Basic construction of solid tantalum electrolytic capacitors ===
Construction of a solid tantalum chip capacitor with manganese dioxide electrolyte

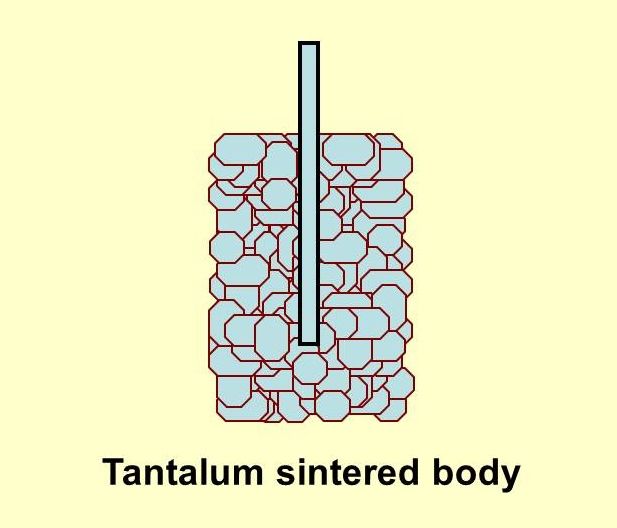
The capacitor cell of a tantalum electrolytic capacitor consists of sintered tantalum powder

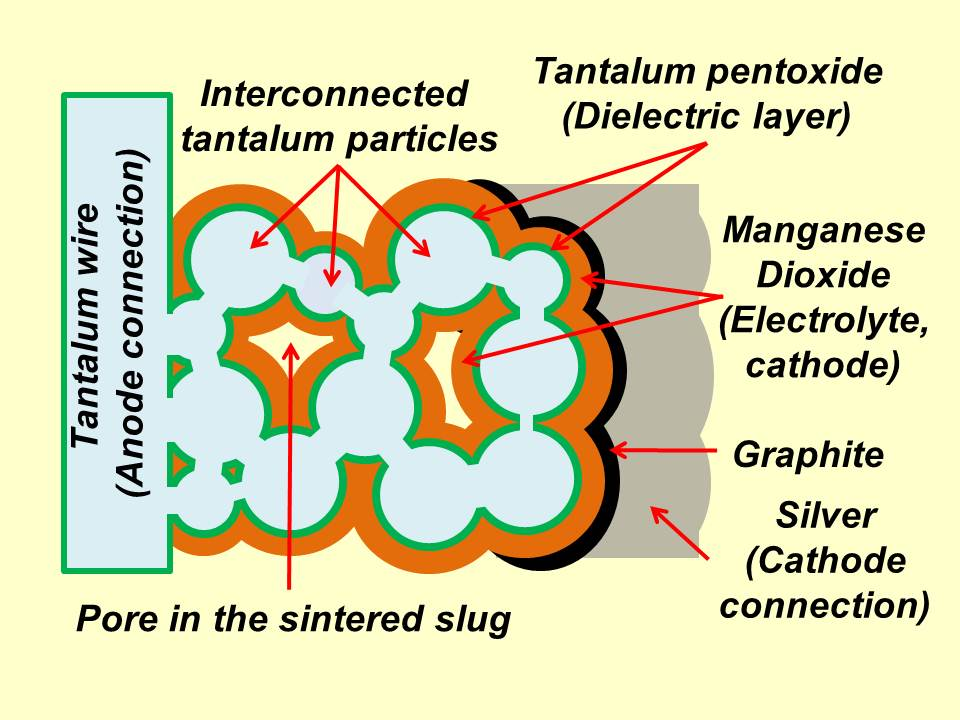
Schematic representation of the structure of a sintered tantalum electrolytic capacitor with solid electrolyte and the cathode contacting layers

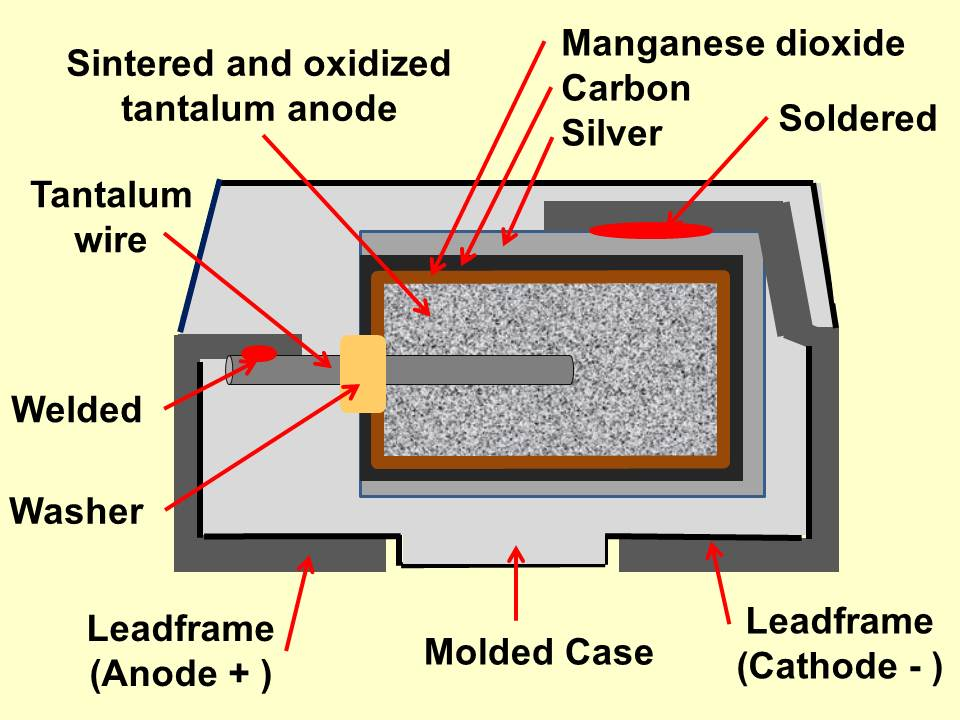
Construction of a typical SMD tantalum electrolytic chip capacitor with solid electrolyte

A typical tantalum capacitor is a chip capacitor and consists of tantalum powder pressed and sintered into a pellet as the anode of the capacitor, with the oxide layer of tantalum pentoxide as a dielectric, and a solid manganese dioxide electrolyte as the cathode.

== Materials, production and styles ==
=== Anode ===
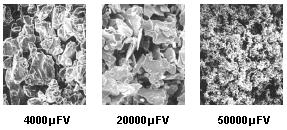
Figure 1: Tantalum powder CV/g.

Tantalum capacitors are manufactured from a powder of relatively pure elemental tantalum metal. A common figure of merit for comparing volumetric efficiency of powders is expressed in capacitance (C, usually in μF) times volts (V) per gram (g). Since the mid-1980s, manufactured tantalum powders have exhibited around a ten-fold improvement in CV/g values (from approximately 20k to 200k). The typical particle size is between 2 and 10 μm. Figure 1 shows powders of successively finer grain, resulting in greater surface area per unit volume. Note the very great difference in particle size between the powders.

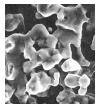
Figure 2: Sintered anode.

The powder is compressed around a tantalum wire (known as the riser wire) to form a "pellet". The riser wire ultimately becomes the anode connection to the capacitor. This pellet/wire combination is subsequently vacuum sintered at high temperature (typically 1200 to 1800 °C) which produces a mechanically strong pellet and drives off many impurities within the powder. During sintering, the powder takes on a sponge-like structure, with all the particles interconnected into a monolithic spatial lattice. This structure is of predictable mechanical strength and density, but is also highly porous, producing a large internal surface area (see Figure 2).

Larger surface areas produce higher capacitance; thus high CV/g powders, which have lower average particle sizes, are used for low voltage, high capacitance parts. By choosing the correct powder type and sintering temperature, a specific capacitance or voltage rating can be achieved. For example, a 220 μF 6 V capacitor will have a surface area close to 346 cm^{2}, or 80% of the size of a sheet of paper (US Letter, 8.5×11 inch paper has area ~413 cm^{2}), although the total volume of the pellet is only about 0.0016 cm^{3}.

=== Dielectric ===
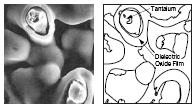
Figure 3: Dielectric layer.

The dielectric is then formed over all the tantalum particle surfaces by the electrochemical process of anodization. To achieve this, the "pellet" is submerged into a very weak solution of acid and DC voltage is applied. The total dielectric thickness is determined by the final voltage applied during the forming process. Initially the power supply is kept in a constant current mode until the correct voltage (i.e. dielectric thickness) has been reached; it then holds this voltage and the current decays to close to zero to provide a uniform thickness throughout the device and production lot. The chemical equations describing the dielectric formation process at the anode are as follows:

2 Ta → 2 Ta^{5+} + 10 e^{−}
2 Ta^{5+} + 10 OH^{−} → Ta_{2}O_{5} + 5 H_{2}O

The oxide forms on the surface of the tantalum, but it also grows into the material. For each unit thickness of oxide growth, one third grows out and two thirds grows in. Due to the limits of oxide growth, there is a limit on the maximum voltage rating of tantalum oxide for each of the presently available tantalum powders (see Figure 3).

The dielectric layer thickness generated by the forming voltage is directly proportional to the voltage proof of electrolytic capacitors. Electrolytic capacitors are manufactured with a safety margin in oxide layer thickness, which is the ratio between voltage used for electrolytical creation of dielectric and rated voltage of the capacitor, to ensure reliable functionality.

The safety margin for solid tantalum capacitors with manganese dioxide electrolyte is typically between 2 and 4. That means that for a 25 V tantalum capacitor with a safety margin of 4 the dielectric voltage proof can withstand 100 V to provide a more robust dielectric. This very high safety factor is substantiated by the failure mechanism of solid tantalum capacitors, "field crystallization". For tantalum capacitors with solid polymer electrolyte the safety margin is much lower, typically around 2.

=== Cathode ===
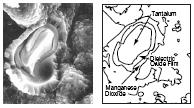
Figure 4: Manganese dioxide layer

The next stage for solid tantalum capacitors is the application of the cathode plate (wet tantalum capacitors use a liquid electrolyte as a cathode in conjunction with their casing). This is achieved by pyrolysis of manganese nitrate into manganese dioxide. The "pellet" is dipped into an aqueous solution of nitrate and then baked in an oven at approximately 250 °C to produce the dioxide coat. The chemical equation is:

Mn(NO_{3})_{2} → MnO_{2} + 2 NO_{2}

This process is repeated several times through varying specific gravities of nitrate solution, to build up a thick coat over all internal and external surfaces of the "pellet", as shown in Figure 4.

In traditional construction, the "pellet" is successively dipped into graphite and then silver to provide a good connection from the manganese dioxide cathode plate to the external cathode termination(see Figure 5).

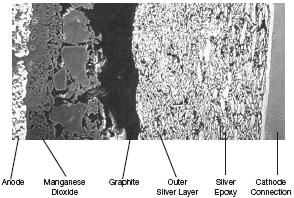
Figure 5: Solid tantalum cathode cross section.

=== Production flow ===
The picture below shows the production flow of tantalum electrolytic chip capacitors with sintered anode and solid manganese dioxide electrolyte.

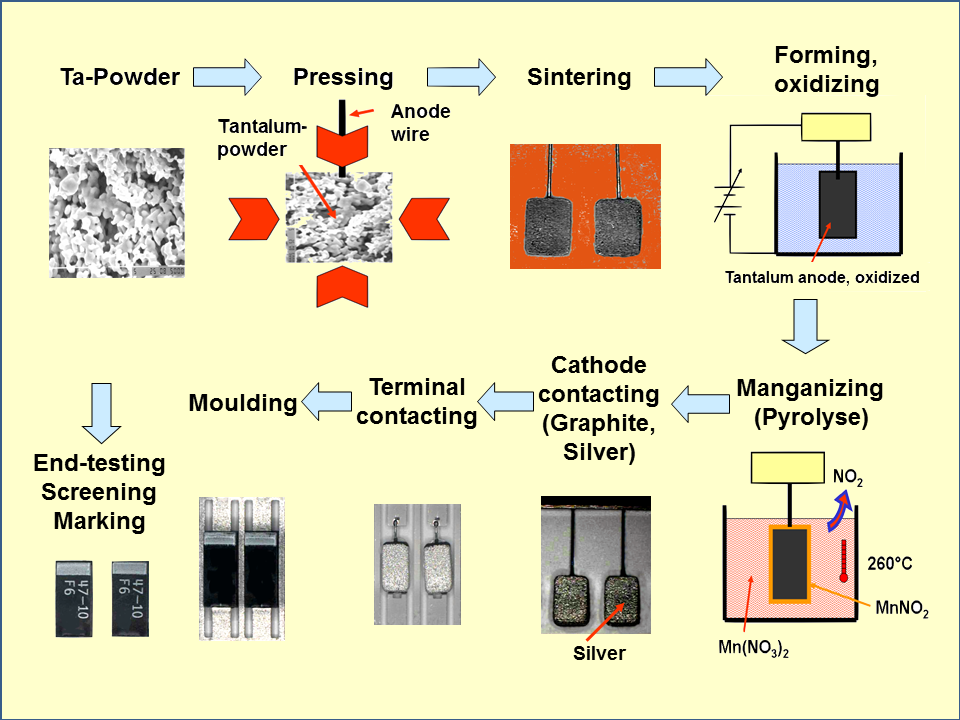
Representation of the production flow of tantalum electrolytic capacitors with sintered anode and solid manganese dioxide electrolyte

=== Styles of tantalum capacitors ===
Tantalum electrolytic capacitors are made in three different styles:

- Tantalum chip capacitors: SMD style for surface mounting, 80% of all tantalum capacitors are SMDs
- Tantalum "pearls", resin-dipped, single-ended style for PCB mounting
- Axial-leaded tantalum capacitors, with solid and non-solid electrolyte, mostly used for military, medical and space applications.
Different styles of tantalum capacitors

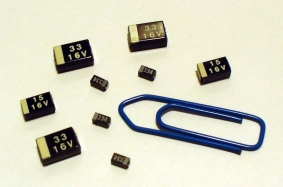
Tantalum chip capacitors

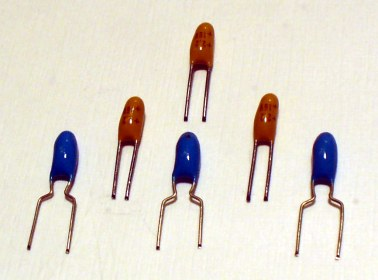
Tantalum "pearls" for PCB mounting

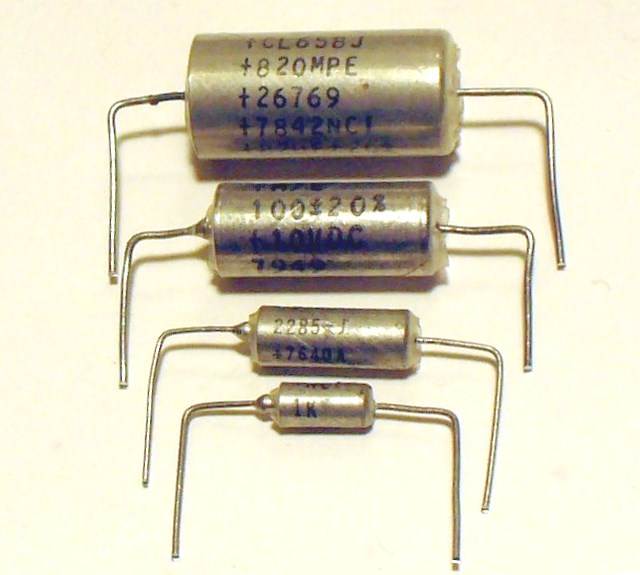
Axial tantalum capacitors

=== Chip capacitors (case size) ===
More than 90% of all tantalum electrolytic capacitors are manufactured in SMD style as tantalum chip capacitors. It has contact surfaces on the end faces of the case and is manufactured in different sizes, typically following the EIA-535-BAAC standard. The different sizes can also be identified by case code letters. For some case sizes (A to E), which have been manufactured for many decades, the dimensions and case coding over all manufactures are still largely the same. However, new developments in tantalum electrolytic capacitors such as the multi-anode technique to reduce the ESR or the "face down" technique to reduce the inductance have led to a much wider range of chip sizes and their case codes. These departures from EIA standards mean devices from different manufacturers are no longer always uniform.

An overview of the dimensions of conventional tantalum rectangular chip capacitors and their coding is shown in the following table:

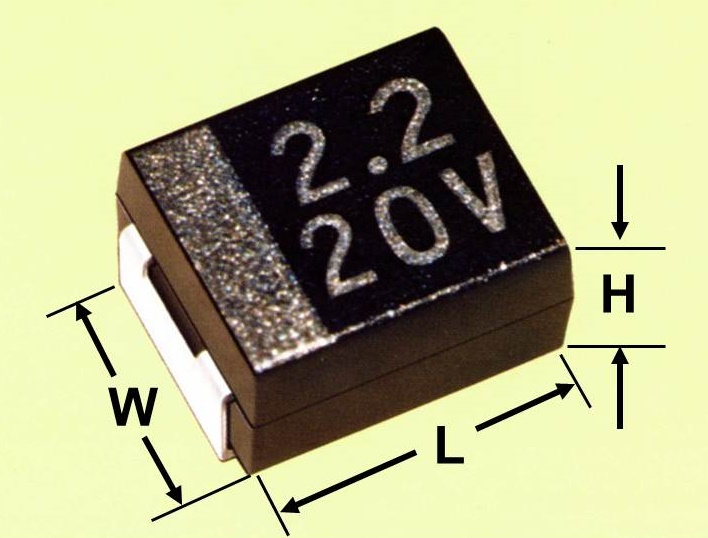
Dimensioning of a tantalum chip capacitor

Standard dimensions for surface-mount (SMD) tantalum chip capacitors
| EIA code metric | L ± 0,2 (mm) | W ± 0,2 (mm) | H max (mm) | EIA code inches | Case code AVX | Case code Kemet | Case code Vishay |
|---|---|---|---|---|---|---|---|
| EIA 1608-08 | 1.6 | 0.8 | 0.8 | 0603 | — | — | — |
| EIA 1608-10 | 1.6 | 0.85 | 1.05 | 0603 | L | — | M, M0 |
| EIA 2012-12 | 2.05 | 1.35 | 1.2 | 0805 | R | R | W |
| EIA 2012-15 | 2.05 | 1.35 | 1.5 | 0805 | P | — | R |
| EIA 3216-10 | 3.2 | 1.6 | 1.0 | 1206 | K | I | Q, A0 |
| EIA 3216-12 | 3.2 | 1.6 | 1.2 | 1206 | S | S | — |
| EIA 3216-18 | 3.2 | 1.6 | 1.8 | 1206 | A | A | A |
| EIA 3528-12 | 3.5 | 2.8 | 1.2 | 1210 | T | T | N |
| EIA 3528-15 | 3.5 | 2.8 | 1.5 | 1210 | H | M | T |
| EIA 3528-21 | 3.5 | 2.8 | 2.1 | 1210 | B | B | B |
| EIA 6032-15 | 6.0 | 3.2 | 1.5 | 2312 | W | U | — |
| EIA 6032-20 | 6.0 | 3.2 | 2.0 | 2312 | F | L | — |
| EIA 6032-28 | 6.0 | 3.2 | 2.8 | 2312 | C | C | C |
| EIA 7343-15 | 7.3 | 4.3 | 1.5 | 2917 | X | W | — |
| EIA 7343-20 | 7.3 | 4.3 | 2.0 | 2917 | Y | V | V |
| EIA 7343-30 | 7.3 | 4.3 | 3.0 | 2917 | N | — | — |
| EIA 7343-31 | 7.3 | 4.3 | 3.1 | 2917 | D | D | D |
| EIA 7343-40 | 7.3 | 4.3 | 4.0 | 2917 | — | Y | — |
| EIA 7343-43 | 7,3 | 4.3 | 4.3 | 2917 | E | X | E |
| EIA 7360-38 | 7.3 | 6.0 | 3.8 | 2623 | — | E | W |
| EIA 7361-38 | 7.3 | 6.1 | 3.8 | 2924 | V | — | — |
| EIA 7361-438 | 7.3 | 6.1 | 4.3 | 2924 | U | — | — |

- Note: EIA 3528 metric is also known as EIA 1411 imperial (inches).

=== Wet tantalum capacitors ===
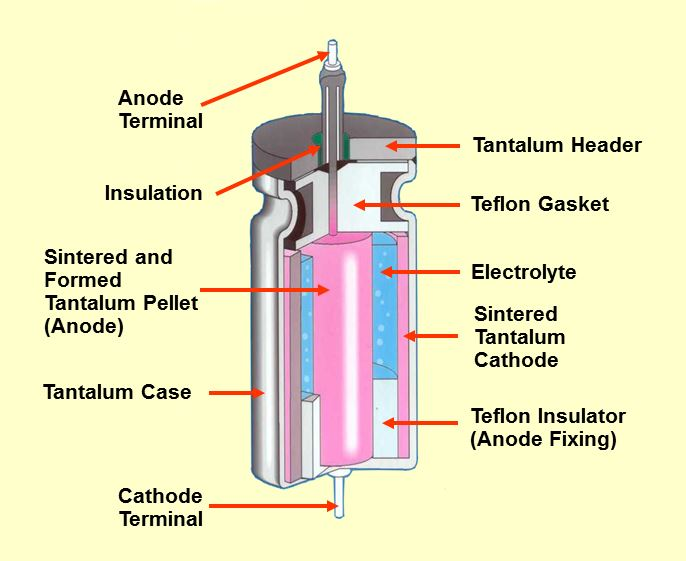
Cross section of a non-solid all tantalum electrolytic capacitor, hermetic sealed

The main feature of modern non-solid (wet) tantalum electrolytic capacitors is their energy density compared with that of solid tantalum and wet aluminum electrolytic capacitors within the same temperature range. Due to their self-healing properties (the non-solid electrolyte can deliver oxygen to form new oxide layer in weak areas of the dielectric), the dielectric thickness can be formed with much lower safety margins and consequently with much thinner dielectric than for solid types, resulting in a higher CV value per volume unit. Additionally, wet tantalum capacitors are able to operate at voltages in excess of 100 V up to 630 V, have a relatively low ESR, and have the lowest leakage current of all electrolytic capacitors.

The original wet tantalum capacitors developed in the 1930s were axial capacitors, having a wound cell consisting of a tantalum anode and foil cathode separated by a paper stripe soaked with an electrolyte, mounted in a silver case and non-hermetic elastomer sealed. Because of the inertness and stability of the tantalum dielectric oxide layer against strong acids, the wet tantalum capacitors could use sulfuric acid as an electrolyte, thus providing them with a relatively low ESR.

Because in the past, silver casings had problems with silver migration and whiskers which led to increasing leakage currents and short circuits, new styles of wet tantalum capacitors use a sintered tantalum pellet cell and a gelled sulfuric acid electrolyte mounted in a pure tantalum case.

Due to their relatively high price, wet tantalum electrolytic capacitors have few consumer applications. They are used in ruggedized industrial applications, such as in probes for oil exploration. Types with military approvals can provide the extended capacitance and voltage ratings, along with the high quality levels required for avionics, military, and space applications.

== History ==
The group of "valve metals" capable of forming an insulating oxide film was discovered in 1875. In 1896 Karol Pollak patented a capacitor using aluminum electrodes and a liquid electrolyte. Aluminum electrolytic capacitors were commercially manufactured in the 1930s.

The first tantalum electrolytic capacitors with wound tantalum foils and non-solid electrolyte were developed in 1930 by Tansitor Electronic Inc. (US), and were used for military purposes.

Solid electrolyte tantalum capacitors were invented by Bell Laboratories in the early 1950s as a miniaturized and more reliable low-voltage support capacitor to complement their newly invented transistor. R. L. Taylor and H. E. Haring from Bell Labs found a solution to the new miniaturized capacitor in early 1950 based on experience with ceramics. They ground metallic tantalum to a powder, pressed this powder into a cylindrical form and then sintered the powder particles at high temperature between 1,500 and 2,000 °C (2,730 and 3,630 °F) under vacuum conditions, into a pellet ("slug").

These first sintered tantalum capacitors used a liquid electrolyte. In 1952 Bell Labs researchers discovered the use of manganese dioxide as a solid electrolyte for a sintered tantalum capacitor.

Although the fundamental inventions came from the Bell Labs, the innovations for manufacturing commercially viable tantalum electrolytic capacitors were done by the researchers of the Sprague Electric Company. Preston Robinson, Sprague's Director of Research, is considered to be the actual inventor of tantalum capacitors in 1954. His invention was supported by R. J. Millard, who introduced the "reform" step in 1955, a significant improvement in which the dielectric of the capacitor was repaired after each dip-and-convert cycle of MnO_{2} deposition. This dramatically reduced the leakage current of the finished capacitors.

This first solid electrolyte manganese dioxide capacitor had 10 times better conductivity than all other types of non-solid electrolyte capacitors. In the style of tantalum pearls, they soon found wide use in radio and new television devices.

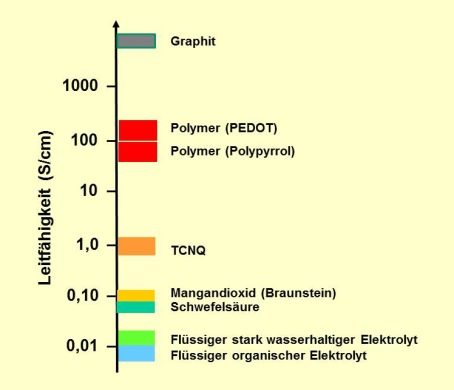
Conductivity of non-solid and solid used electrolytes

In 1971, Intel launched its first microcomputer (the MCS 4) and in 1972 Hewlett Packard launched one of the first pocket calculators (the HP-35). The requirements for capacitors increased, especially the demand for lower losses. The equivalent series resistance (ESR) for bypass and decoupling capacitors of standard electrolytic capacitors needed to be decreased.

Although solid tantalum capacitors offered lower ESR and leakage current values than the aluminum electrolytics, in 1980 a price shock for tantalum in the industry dramatically reduced the usability of tantalum capacitors, especially in consumer entertainment electronics. In search of cheaper alternatives, the industry switched back to using aluminum electrolytic capacitors.

The development of conducting polymers by Alan J. Heeger, Alan MacDiarmid and Hideki Shirakawa in 1975 was a break-through in point of lower ESR. The conductivities of conductive polymers such as polypyrrole (PPy) or PEDOT are better by a factor of 1000 than that of manganese dioxide, and are close to the conductivity of metals. In 1993 NEC introduced their SMD polymer tantalum electrolytic capacitors, called "NeoCap". In 1997 Sanyo followed with their "POSCAP" polymer tantalum chips.

A new conductive polymer for tantalum polymer capacitors was presented by Kemet at the "1999 Carts" conference. This capacitor used the newly developed organic conductive polymer PEDT Poly(3,4-ethylenedioxythiophene), also known as PEDOT (trade name Baytron).

This development to low ESR capacitors with high CV-volumes in chip style for the rapid growing SMD technology in the 1990s increased the demand for tantalum chips dramatically. However, another price explosion for tantalum in 2000/2001 forced the development of niobium electrolytic capacitors with manganese dioxide electrolyte, which have been available since 2002. The materials and processes used to produce niobium-dielectric capacitors are essentially the same as for existing tantalum-dielectric capacitors. The characteristics of niobium electrolytic capacitors and tantalum electrolytic capacitors are roughly comparable.

== Electrical characteristics ==
=== Series-equivalent circuit ===
Series-equivalent circuit model of a tantalum capacitor

Tantalum electrolytic capacitors as discrete components are not ideal capacitors, as they have losses and parasitic inductive parts. All properties can be defined and specified by a series equivalent circuit composed of an idealized capacitance and additional electrical components which model all losses and inductive parameters of a capacitor. In this series-equivalent circuit the electrical characteristics are defined by:

- C, the capacitance of the capacitor
- R_{leak}, the resistance representing the leakage current of the capacitor
- R_{ESR}, the equivalent series resistance which summarizes all ohmic losses of the capacitor, usually abbreviated as "ESR"
- L_{ESL}, the equivalent series inductance which is the effective self-inductance of the capacitor, usually abbreviated as "ESL".

Using a series equivalent circuit rather than a parallel equivalent circuit is specified by IEC/EN 60384-1.

=== Capacitance standard values and tolerances ===
The electrical characteristics of tantalum electrolytic capacitors depend on the structure of the anode and the electrolyte used. This influences the capacitance value of tantalum capacitors, which depend on operating frequency and temperature. The basic unit of electrolytic capacitors capacitance is microfarad (μF).

The capacitance value specified in the data sheets of the manufacturers is called rated capacitance C_{R} or nominal capacitance C_{N} and is the value for which the capacitor has been designed. Standardized measuring condition for electrolytic capacitors is an AC measuring method with a frequency of 100 to 120 Hz. Electrolytic capacitors differ from other capacitor types, whose capacitances are typically measured at 1 kHz or higher. For tantalum capacitors a DC bias voltage of 1.1 to 1.5 V for types with a rated voltage of ≤2.5 V or 2.1 to 2.5 V for types with a rated voltage of >2.5 V may be applied during the measurement to avoid reverse voltage.

The percentage of allowed deviation of the measured capacitance from the rated value is called capacitance tolerance. Electrolytic capacitors are available in different tolerance series classifications, whose values are specified in the E series specified in IEC 60063. For abbreviated marking in tight spaces, a letter code for each tolerance is specified in IEC 60062.

- rated capacitance, E3 series, tolerance ±20%, letter code "M"
- rated capacitance, E6 series, tolerance ±20%, letter code "M"
- rated capacitance, E12 series, tolerance ±10%, letter code "K"

The required capacitance tolerance is determined by the particular application. Electrolytic capacitors, which are often used for filtering and bypassing capacitors don't have the need for narrow tolerances because they are mostly not used for accurate frequency applications like oscillators.

=== Rated and category voltage ===
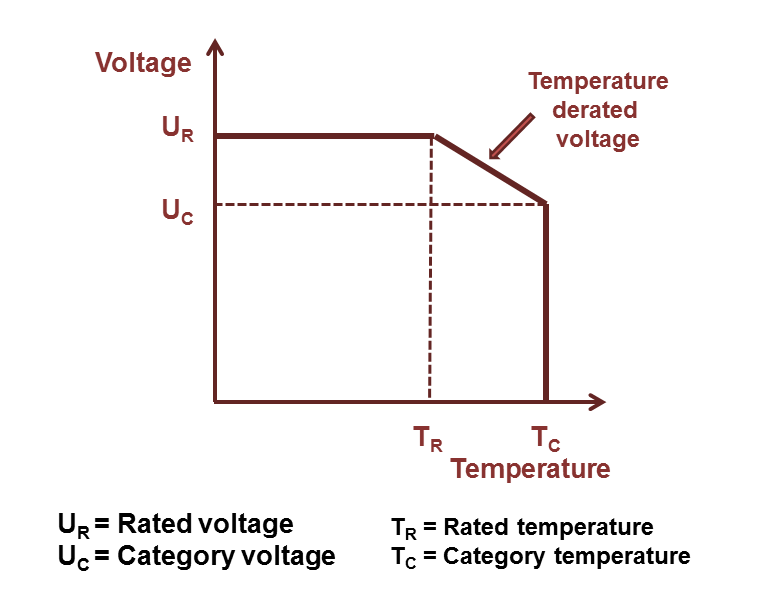
Relation between rated and category voltage and rated and category temperature

Referring to IEC/EN 60384-1 standard the allowed operating voltage for tantalum capacitors is called "rated voltage U_{R} " or "nominal voltage U_{N}". The rated voltage U_{R} is the maximum DC voltage or peak pulse voltage that may be applied continuously at any temperature within the rated temperature range T_{R} (IEC/EN 60384-1).

The voltage rating of electrolytic capacitors decreases with increasing temperature. For some applications it is important to use a higher temperature range. Lowering the voltage applied at a higher temperature maintains safety margins. For some capacitor types therefore the IEC standard specify a "temperature derated voltage" for a higher temperature, the "category voltage U_{C}". The category voltage is the maximum DC voltage or peak pulse voltage that may be applied continuously to a capacitor at any temperature within the category temperature range T_{C}. The relation between both voltages and temperatures is given in the picture right.

Lower voltage applied may have positive influences for tantalum electrolytic capacitors. Lowering the voltage applied increases the reliability and reduces the expected failure rate.

Applying a higher voltage than specified may destroy tantalum electrolytic capacitors.

=== Surge voltage ===
The surge voltage indicates the maximum peak voltage value that may be applied to electrolytic capacitors during their application for a limited number of cycles. The surge voltage is standardized in IEC/EN 60384-1. For tantalum electrolytic capacitors the surge voltage shall be 1.3 times of the rated voltage, rounded off to the nearest volt. The surge voltage applied to tantalum capacitors may influence the capacitors failure rate.

=== Transient voltage ===
Transient voltage or a current spike applied to tantalum electrolytic capacitors with solid manganese dioxide electrolyte can cause some tantalum capacitors to fail and may directly lead to a short.

=== Reverse voltage ===
Tantalum electrolytic are polarized and generally require anode electrode voltage to be positive relative to the cathode voltage.

With a reverse voltage applied, a reverse leakage current flows in very small areas of microcracks or other defects across the dielectric layer to the anode of the electrolytic capacitor. Although the current may only be a few microamps, it represents a very high localized current density which can cause a tiny hot-spot. This can cause some conversion of amorphous tantalum pentoxide to the more conductive crystalline form. When a high current is available, this effect can avalanche and the capacitor may become a total short.

Nevertheless, tantalum electrolytic capacitors can withstand for short instants a reverse voltage for a limited number of cycles. The most common guidelines for tantalum reverse voltage are:

- 10% of rated voltage to a maximum of 1 V at 25 °C,
- 3% of rated voltage to a maximum of 0.5 V at 85 °C,
- 1% of rated voltage to a maximum of 0.1 V at 125 °C.

These guidelines apply for short excursion and should never be used to determine the maximum reverse voltage under which a capacitor can be used permanently.

=== Impedance ===
Simplified series-equivalent circuit of a capacitor for higher frequencies (above); vector diagram with electrical reactances X_{ESL} and X_{C} and resistance ESR and for illustration the impedance Z and dissipation factor tan δ

Tantalum electrolytic capacitors, as well as other conventional capacitors, have two electrical functions. For timers or similar applications, capacitors are seen as a storage component to store electrical energy. But for smoothing, bypassing, or decoupling applications like in power supplies, the capacitors work additionally as AC resistors to filter undesired AC components from voltage rails. For this (biased) AC function the frequency dependent AC resistance (impedance "Z") is as important as the capacitance value.

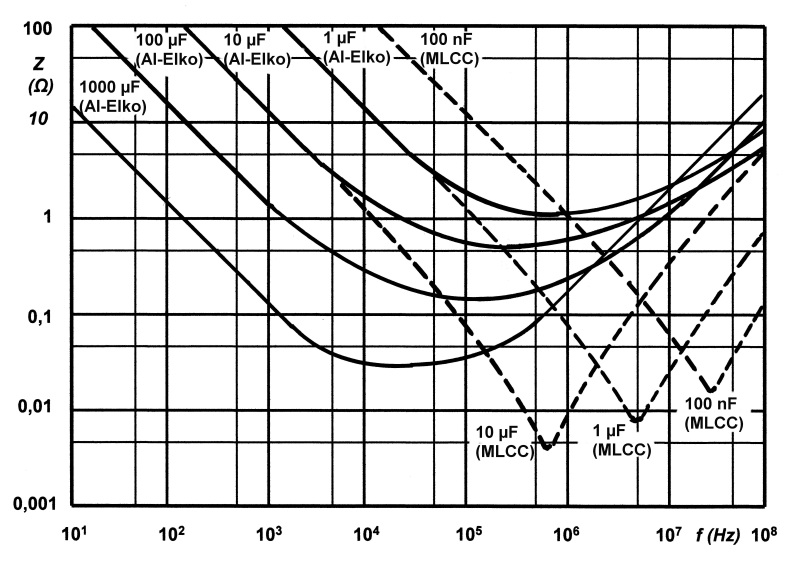
Typical impedance curves for different capacitance values over frequency. As higher the capacitance as lower the resonance frequency.

The impedance is the complex ratio of the voltage to the current with both magnitude and phase at a particular frequency in an AC circuit. In this sense impedance is a measure of the ability of the capacitor to attenuate alternating currents and can be used like Ohm's law

$$Z = \frac{\hat u}{\hat \imath} = \frac{U_\mathrm{eff}}{I_\mathrm{eff}}.$$

The impedance is a frequency dependent AC resistance and possesses both magnitude and phase at a particular frequency. In data sheets of electrolytic capacitors, only the impedance magnitude |Z| is specified, and simply written as "Z". Regarding to the IEC/EN 60384-1 standard, the impedance values of tantalum electrolytic capacitors are measured and specified at 10 kHz or 100 kHz depending on the capacitance and voltage of the capacitor.

Besides measuring, the impedance can also be calculated using the idealized components out of a capacitor's series-equivalent circuit, including an ideal capacitor C, a resistor ESR, and an inductance ESL. In this case the impedance at the angular frequency ω therefore is given by the geometric (complex) addition of ESR, by a capacitive reactance X_{C}

$$X_C= -\frac{1}{\omega C}$$

and by an inductive reactance X_{L} (Inductance)

$X_L=\omega L_{\mathrm{ESL}}$.

Then Z is given by

$$Z=\sqrt{{ESR}^2 + (X_\mathrm{C} + (-X_\mathrm{L}))^2}$$.

In the special case of resonance, in which the both reactive resistances X_{C} and X_{L} have the same value (X_{C}=X_{L}), then the impedance will only be determined by ESR. With frequencies above the resonance the impedance increases again due to the ESL of the capacitor. At this point, the capacitor begins to behave primarily as an inductance.

=== ESR and dissipation factor tan δ ===
Typical impedance and ESR curves as a function of frequency and temperature

Typical impedance and ESR as a function of frequency

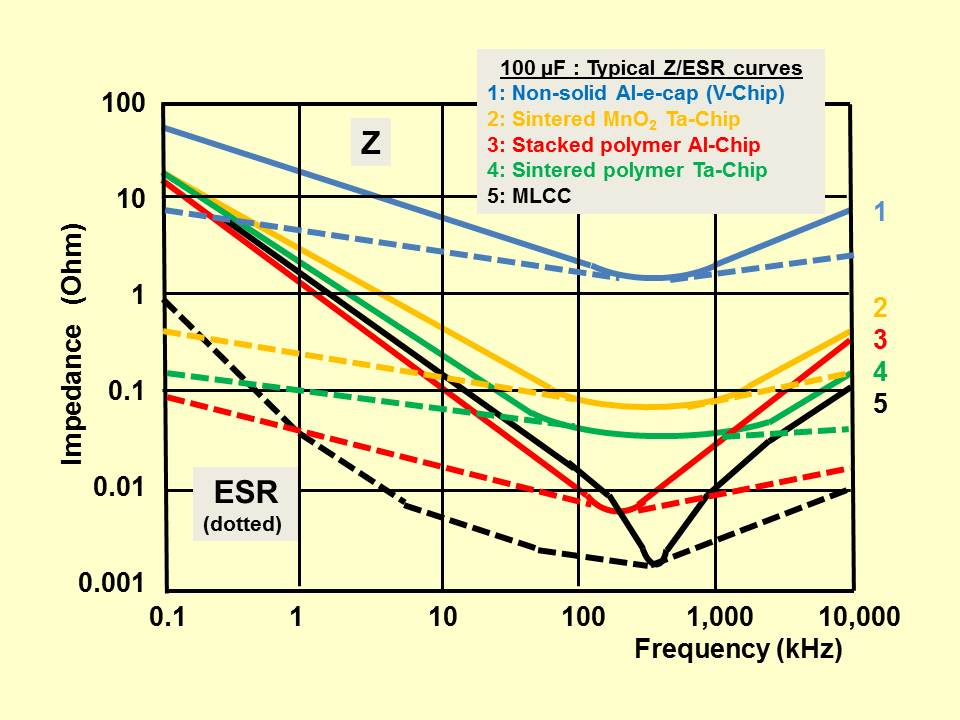
Typical impedance and ESR curves over frequency for different electrolytic capacitor styles compared with MLCC

The equivalent series resistance (ESR) summarizes all resistive losses of the capacitor. These are the terminal resistances, the contact resistance of the electrode contact, the line resistance of the electrodes, the electrolyte resistance, and the dielectric losses in the dielectric oxide layer.

ESR influences the remaining superimposed AC ripple behind smoothing and may influence the circuit functionality. Related to the capacitor ESR is accountable for internal heat generation if a #ripple current flows over the capacitor. This internal heat may influence the reliability of tantalum electrolytic capacitors.

Generally, the ESR decreases with increasing frequency and temperature.

Discussions of electrolytic capacitors historically sometimes refer to the dissipation factor, tan δ, in the relevant data sheets instead of ESR. The dissipation factor is determined by the tangent of the phase angle between the subtraction of capacitive reactance X_{C} from inductive reactance X_{L}, and the ESR. If the capacitor's inductance ESL is small, the dissipation factor can be approximated as:

$$\tan \delta = \mbox{ESR} \cdot \omega C$$

The dissipation factor tan δ is used for capacitors with very low losses in frequency determining circuits or resonant circuits where the reciprocal value of the dissipation factor is called the quality factor (Q) which represents a resonator's bandwidth.

=== Ripple current ===
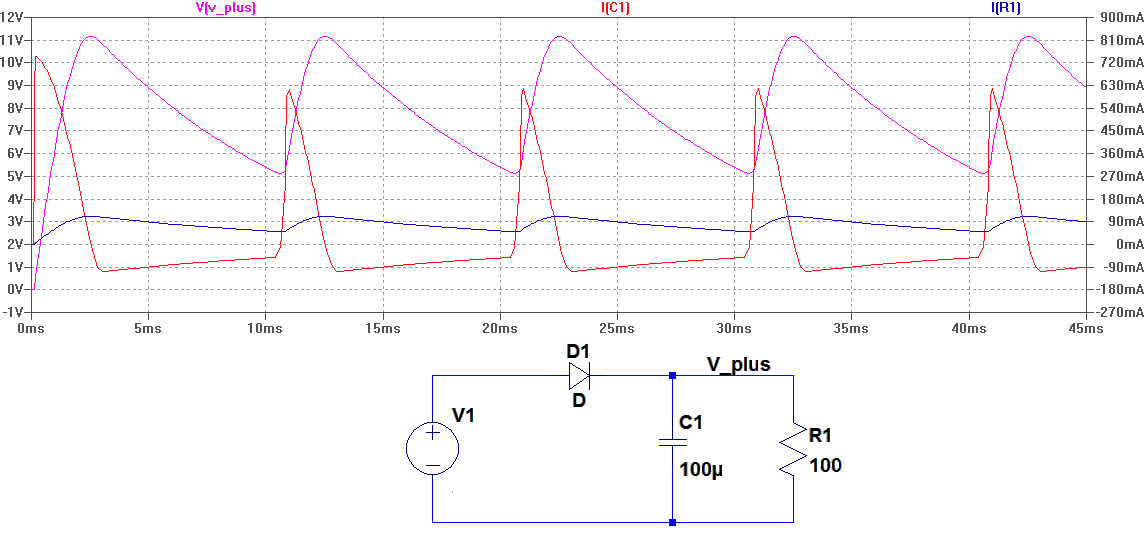
The high ripple current across the smoothing capacitor C1 in a power supply with half-wave rectification causes significant internal heat generation corresponding to the capacitor's ESR

A "ripple current" is the RMS value of a superimposed AC current of any frequency upon a DC current. It arises mainly in power supplies (including switched-mode power supplies) after rectifying an AC voltage and flows as charge and discharge current through the decoupling or smoothing capacitor.

Ripple currents generate heat inside the capacitor body. This dissipation power loss P_{L} is caused by ESR and is the squared value of the effective (RMS) ripple current I_{R}.

$$P_{L} = I_R^2 \cdot ESR$$

This internal generated heat, in addition to the ambient temperature and possibly other external heat sources, leads to a capacitor body temperature having a temperature difference of Δ T against the ambient. This heat has to be distributed as thermal losses P_{th} over the capacitors surface A and the thermal resistance β to the ambient.

$$P_{th} = \Delta T \cdot A \cdot \beta$$

The internal generated heat has to be distributed to the ambient by thermal radiation, convection, and thermal conduction. The temperature of the capacitor, which is established on the balance between heat produced and distributed, should not exceed the capacitors maximum specified temperature.

The ripple current is specified as an effective (RMS) value at 100 or 120 Hz or at 10 kHz at upper category temperature. Non-sinusoidal ripple currents have to be analyzed and separated into their component sinusoidal frequencies by means of Fourier analysis and the equivalent ripple current calculated as the square root of the sum of the squares of the individual currents.

$$I_R=\sqrt{{i_1}^2 + {i_2}^2  +  {i_3}^2 + {i_n}^2 }$$

In solid tantalum electrolytic capacitors the heat generated by the ripple current influences the reliability of the capacitors. Exceeding the limit tends to result in catastrophic failures with shorts and burning components.

=== Current surge, peak or pulse current ===
Solid tantalum electrolytic capacitors can be damaged by surge, peak or pulse currents. Tantalum capacitors, which are exposed to surge, peak or pulse currents should be used with a voltage derating up to 70% in highly inductive circuits. If possible, the voltage profile should be a ramp turn-on, as this reduces the peak current seen by the capacitor.

=== Leakage current ===
general leakage behavior of electrolytic capacitors: leakage current $I_{leak}$ as a function of time $t$ for different kinds of electrolytes non solid, high water content non solid, organic solid, polymer

The DC leakage current is a special characteristic for electrolytic capacitors other conventional capacitors don't have. This current is represented by the resistor R_{leak} in parallel with the capacitor in the series-equivalent circuit of electrolytic capacitors. The main causes of leakage current for solid tantalum capacitors are electrical breakdown of the dielectric, conductive paths due to impurities or due to poor anodization, bypassing of dielectric due to excess manganese dioxide, due to moisture paths or due to cathode conductors (carbon, silver). This leakage current in solid electrolyte capacitors cannot be reduced by "healing" in the sense of generating new oxide because under normal conditions solid electrolytes are unable to deliver oxygen for forming processes. This statement should not be confused with the self-healing process during field crystallization, as described in Reliability (failure rate).

The specification of the leakage current in datasheets often will be given by multiplication of the rated capacitance value C_{R} with the value of the rated voltage U_{R} together with an addendum figure, measured after a measuring time of 2 or 5 minutes, for example:

$$I_\mathrm{Leak} = 0{.}01\,\mathrm{{A}\over{ V \cdot F}} \cdot U_\mathrm R \cdot C_\mathrm R + 3\,\mathrm{\mu A}$$

The value of the leakage current depends on the voltage applied, on temperature of the capacitor, on measuring time, and on influence of moisture caused by case sealing conditions. They normally have a very low leakage current, most much lower than the specified worst-case.

=== Dielectric absorption (soakage) ===
Dielectric absorption occurs when a capacitor that has remained charged for a long time retains some charge when briefly discharged. Although an ideal capacitor would reach zero volts after discharge, real capacitors develop a small voltage from time-delayed dipole discharging, a phenomenon that is also called dielectric relaxation, "soakage" or "battery action".

Values of dielectric absorption for tantalum capacitors
| Type of capacitor | Dielectric absorption |
|---|---|
| Tantalum electrolytic capacitors with solid electrolyte | 2 to 3%, 10% |

Dielectric absorption can cause a problem in circuits where very small currents are used, such as long-time-constant integrators or sample-and-hold circuits. However, in most applications where tantalum electrolytic capacitors are supporting power supply lines, dielectric absorption is not a problem.

== Reliability and life time ==
=== Reliability (failure rate) ===
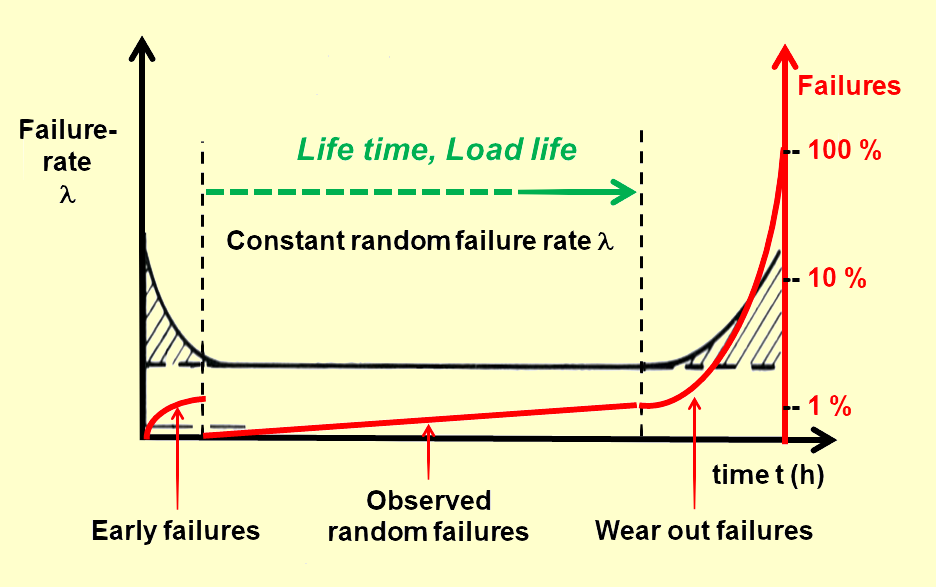
Bathtub curve with times of "early failures", "random failures", and wear-out failures". The time of random failures is the time of constant failure rate

The reliability of a component is a property that indicates how well a component performs its function in a time interval. It is subject to a stochastic process and can be described qualitatively and quantitatively; it is not directly measurable. The reliability of electrolytic capacitors are empirically determined by identifying the failure rate in production-accompanying endurance tests, see Reliability engineering#Reliability testing.

The reliability normally is shown in a bathtub curve and is divided into three areas: Early failures or infant mortality failures, constant random failures and wear out failures. Failure types included in the total failure rate are short circuit, open circuit, and degradation failures (exceeding electrical parameters).

The reliability prediction is generally expressed in a failure rate λ, abbreviation FIT (failures in time). This is the number of failures that can be expected in one billion (10^{9}) component-hours of operation (e.g. 1000 components for 1 million hours, or 1 million components for 1000 hours which is 1 ppm/1000 hours) at fixed working conditions during the period of constant random failures. These failure rate model implicitly assume the idea of "random failure". Individual components fail at random times but at a predictable rate. The standard operation conditions for the failure rate FIT are 40 °C and 0.5 U_{R}.

The reciprocal value of FIT is mean time between failures (MTBF).

For tantalum capacitors, often the failure rate is specified at 85 °C and rated voltage U_{R} as reference conditions and expressed as per cent failed components per thousand hours (n %/1000 h). That is "n" number of failed components per 10^{5} hours or in FIT the ten-thousand-fold value per 10^{9} hours.

For conditions other than the standard operation conditions 40 °C and 0.5 U_{R}, for other temperature and voltage applied, for current load, capacitance value, circuit resistance, mechanical influences and humidity, the FIT figure can recalculated with acceleration factors standardized for industrial or military contexts. For example, higher temperature and applied voltage cause the failure rate to increase.

The most often cited source for recalculation the failure rate is the MIL-HDBK-217F, the "bible" of failure rate calculations for electronic components. SQC Online, the online statistical calculators for acceptance sampling and quality control gives an online tool for short examination to calculate given failure rate values to application conditions.

Some manufacturers of tantalum capacitors may have their own FIT calculation tables.

Tantalum capacitors are reliable components. Continuous improvement in tantalum powder and capacitor technologies have resulted in a significant reduction in the amount of impurities present, which formerly have caused most of the field crystallization failures. Commercially available tantalum capacitors now have reached as standard products the high MIL standard "C" level which is 0.01%/1000h at 85 °C and U_{R} or 1 failure per 10^{7} hours at 85 °C and U_{R}. Recalculated in FIT with the acceleration factors coming from MIL HDKB 217F at 40 °C and 0.5 U_{R} is this failure rate for a 100 μF/25 V tantalum chip capacitor used with a series resistance of 0.1 Ω the failure rate is 0.02 FIT.

=== Life time ===
The life time, service life, load life or useful life of tantalum electrolytic capacitors depends entirely on the electrolyte used:

- Those using liquid electrolytes do not have a life time specification. (When hermetically sealed)
- Those using manganese dioxide electrolytes do not have a life time specification.
- Those using polymer electrolytes do have a life time specification.

The polymer electrolyte have a small deterioration of conductivity by a thermal degradation mechanism of the conductive polymer. The electrical conductivity decreased, as a function of time, in agreement with a granular metal type structure, in which aging is due to the shrinking of the conductive polymer grains. The life time of polymer electrolytic capacitors is specified in similar terms to the non-solid electrolytic caps, but its life time calculation follows other rules which lead to much longer operational life times.

=== Failure modes and self-healing mechanism ===
Tantalum capacitors show different electrical long-term behaviors depending on the electrolyte used. Application rules for types with an inherent failure mode are specified to ensure high reliability and long life.

Long-term electrical behavior, failure modes, self-healing mechanism, and application rules of the different types of tantalum electrolytic capacitors
| Type of electrolytic capacitors | Long-term electrical behavior | Failure modes | Self-healing mechanism | Application rules |
|---|---|---|---|---|
| Tantalum e-caps solid MnO_{2} electrolyte | Stable | Field crystallization | Thermally induced insulating of faults in the dielectric by reduction of the electrolyte MnO_{2} into insulating Mn_{2}O_{3} if current availability is limited | Voltage derating 50% Series resistance 3 Ω/V |
| Tantalum e-caps solid polymer electrolyte | Deterioration of conductivity, ESR increases | Field crystallization | Insulating of faults in the dielectric by oxidation or evaporation of the polymer electrolyte | Voltage derating 20% |

Tantalum capacitors are reliable on the same very high level as other electronic components with very low failure rates. However, they have a single unique failure mode called "field crystallization". Field crystallization is the major reason for degradation and catastrophic failures of solid tantalum capacitors. More than 90% of the today's rare failures in tantalum solid-state electrolytic capacitors are caused by shorts or increased leakage current due to this failure mode.

The extremely thin oxide film of a tantalum electrolytic capacitor, the dielectric layer, must be formed in an amorphous structure. Changing the amorphous structure into a crystallized structure is reported to increase the conductivity by 1000 times, combined with an enlargement of the oxide volume. The field crystallization followed by a dielectric breakdown is characterized by a sudden rise in leakage current within a few milliseconds, from nanoamp magnitude to amp magnitude in low-impedance circuits. Increasing current flow can accelerate in an "avalanche effect" and rapidly spread through the metal/oxide. This can result in various degrees of destruction from rather small, burned areas on the oxide to zigzag burned streaks covering large areas of the pellet or complete oxidation of the metal. If the current source is unlimited a field crystallization may cause a capacitor short circuit. In this circumstance, the failure can be catastrophic if there is nothing to limit the available current, as the series resistance of the capacitor can become very low.

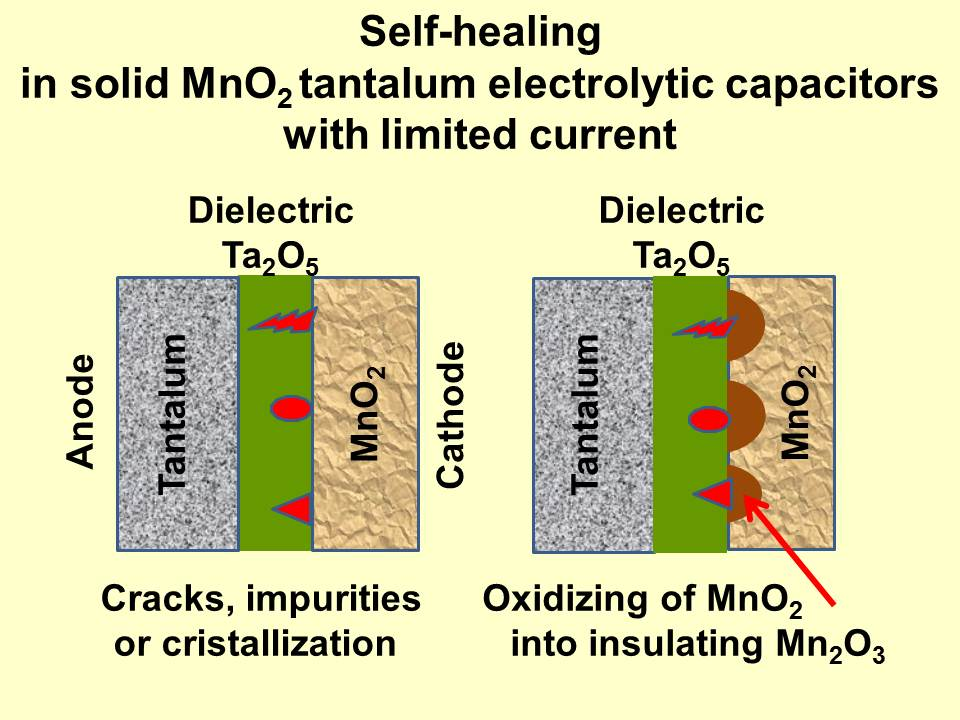
If the current is limited in tantalum electrolytic capacitors with solid MnO_{2} electrolyte, a self-healing process can take place, reducing MnO_{2} into insulating Mn_{2}O_{3}

Impurities, tiny mechanical damages, or imperfections in the dielectric can affect the structure, changing it from amorphous to crystalline structure and thus lowering the dielectric strength. The purity of the tantalum powder is one of the most important parameters for defining its risk of crystallization. Since the mid-1980s, manufactured tantalum powders have exhibited an increase in purity.

Surge currents after soldering-induced stresses may start crystallization, leading to insulation breakdown. The only way to avoid catastrophic failures is to limit the current which can flow from the source in order to reduce the breakdown to a limited area. Current flowing through the crystallized area causes heating in the manganese dioxide cathode near the fault. At increased temperatures a chemical reaction then reduces the surrounding conductive manganese dioxide to the insulating manganese(III) oxide (Mn_{2}O_{3}) and insulates the crystallized oxide in the tantalum oxide layer, stopping local current flow.

==== Failure avoidance ====
Solid tantalum capacitors with crystallization are most likely to fail at power-on. It is believed that the voltage across the dielectric layer is the trigger mechanism for the breakdown and that the switch-on current pushes the collapse to a catastrophic failure. To prevent such sudden failures, manufacturers recommend:

- 50% application voltage derating against rated voltage
- using a series resistance of 3 Ω/V or
- using of circuits with slow power-up modes (soft-start circuits).

== Additional information ==
=== Capacitor symbols ===
Electrolytic capacitor symbols

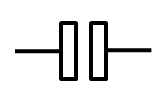
| Polarized- electrolytic capacitor | Polarized- electrolytic capacitor | Polarized- electrolytic capacitor | Bipolar electrolytic- capacitor |

=== Parallel connection ===
Small or low voltage electrolytic capacitors may be safely connected in parallel. Large sizes capacitors, especially large sizes and high voltage types should be individually protected against sudden discharge of the whole bank due to a failed capacitor.

=== Series connection ===
Some applications like AC/AC converters with DC-link for frequency controls in three-phase grids need higher voltages than aluminum electrolytic capacitors usually offer. For such applications electrolytic capacitors can be connected in series for increased voltage withstanding capability. During charging, the voltage across each of the capacitors connected in series is proportional to the inverse of the individual capacitor's leakage current. Since every capacitor differs a little bit in individual leakage current the capacitors with a higher leakage current will get less voltage. The voltage balance over the series connected capacitors is not symmetrically. Passive or active voltage balance has to be provided in order to stabilize the voltage over each individual capacitor.

=== Polarity marking ===
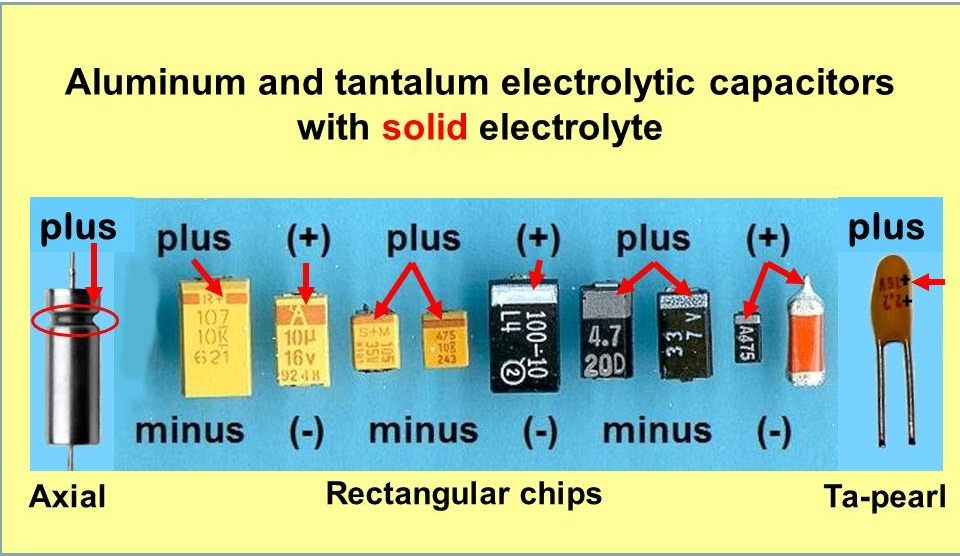
Polarity marking of tantalum electrolytic capacitors

All tantalum capacitors are polarized components, with distinctly marked positive or negative terminals. When subjected to reversed polarity (even briefly), the capacitor depolarizes and the dielectric oxide layer breaks down, which can cause it to fail even when later operated with correct polarity. If the failure is a short circuit (the most common occurrence), and current is not limited to a safe value, catastrophic thermal runaway may occur. This failure can even result in the capacitor forcefully ejecting its burning core.

Tantalum electrolytic capacitors with solid electrolyte are marked at their positive terminal with a bar or a "+". Tantalum electrolytic capacitors with non-solid electrolyte (axial leaded style) are marked on the negative terminal with a bar or a "-" (minus). The polarity better can be identified on the shaped side of the case, which has the positive terminal. The different marking styles can cause dangerous confusion.

A particular cause of confusion is that on surface mount tantalum capacitors the positive terminal is marked with a bar. Whereas on aluminium surface mount capacitors it is the negative terminal that is so marked.

For Tantalum capacitors from the early 1970s the polarity is indicated by a dot. Positive lead is the lead on the right when the side with the dot is facing you. The positive lead may also be very slightly longer. Furthermore the polarity is marked on PCBs by differently-shaped solder points if there are no "+" or "-" signs printed on the PCB. For example a square-shaped solder point is used for positive polarity (needs to be verified on particular case measuring connection against ground, negative or positive voltage pins)

=== Imprinted markings ===
Tantalum capacitors, like most other electronic components and if enough space is available, have imprinted markings to indicate manufacturer, type, electrical and thermal characteristics, and date of manufacture. But most tantalum capacitors are chip types so the reduced space limits the imprinted signs to capacitance, tolerance, voltage and polarity.

Smaller capacitors use a shorthand notation. The most commonly used format is: XYZ J/K/M "V", where XYZ represents the capacitance (calculated as XY × 10^{Z} pF), the letters K or M indicate the tolerance (±10% and ±20% respectively) and "V" represents the working voltage.

Examples:

- 105K 330V implies a capacitance of 10 × 10^{5} pF = 1 μF (K = ±10%) with a working voltage of 330 V.
- 476M 100V implies a capacitance of 47 × 10^{6} pF = 47 μF (M = ±20%) with a working voltage of 100 V.

Capacitance, tolerance and date of manufacture can be indicated with a short code specified in IEC/EN 60062. Examples of short-marking of the rated capacitance (microfarads): μ47 = 0,47 μF, 4μ7 = 4.7 μF, 47μ = 47 μF

The date of manufacture is often printed in accordance with international standards.

- Version 1: coding with year/week numeral code, "1208" is "2012, week number 8".
- Version 2: coding with year code/month code. The year codes are: "R" = 2003, "S"= 2004, "T" = 2005, "U" = 2006, "V" = 2007, "W" = 2008, "X" = 2009, "A" = 2010, "B" = 2011, "C" = 2012, "D" = 2013, "E" = 2014 etc. Month codes are: "1" to "9" = Jan. to Sept., "O" = October, "N" = November, "D" = December. "X5" is then "2009, May"

For very small capacitors no marking is possible, only the component's packaging or the assembly manufacturer's records of the components used can be used to identify a component fully.

=== Standardization ===
Standard definitions of characteristics and test methods for electrical and electronic components and related technologies are published by the International Electrotechnical Commission (IEC), a non-profit, non-governmental international standards organization, which defer to the standards of other industry organizations for particular application characteristics, e.g. the EIA size standards, IPC solderability standards, etc. The quality and reliability standards and methods of the US MIL-STD specifications are used for components requiring a higher reliability or a less benign operating environment are required.

The definition of the characteristics and the procedure of the test methods for capacitors for use in electronic equipment are set out in the Generic specification:

- IEC/EN 60384-1: Fixed capacitors for use in electronic equipment

The tests and requirements to be met by aluminum and tantalum electrolytic capacitors for use in electronic equipment for approval as standardized types are set out in the following sectional specifications:

- IEC/EN 60384-3—Surface mount fixed tantalum electrolytic capacitors with manganese dioxide solid electrolyte
- IEC/EN 60384-15—fixed tantalum capacitors with non-solid and solid electrolyte
- IEC/EN 60384-24—Surface mount fixed tantalum electrolytic capacitors with conductive polymer solid electrolyte

=== Tantalum ore ===
Tantalum capacitors are the main use of the element tantalum. Tantalum ore is one of the conflict minerals. Some non-governmental organizations are working together to raise awareness of the relationship between consumer electronic devices and conflict minerals.

=== Market ===
The market of tantalum electrolytic capacitors in 2008 was approximately US$2.2 billion, which was roughly 12% of the total capacitor market.

Product programs of larger manufacturers of tantalum electrolytic capacitors
| Manufacturer | Available versions | | | | |
| Manufacturer | Ta-MnO_{2}- SMD-chips | Ta-polymer- SMD-chips | Ta-MnO_{2}- radial | Axial-solid-MnO_{2}- MIL-PRF-39003 | Axial-wet- MIL-PRF-39006 |
|---|---|---|---|---|---|
| AVX | X | X | X | — | X |
| Cornell-Dubillier | X | — | — | — | — |
| Exxelia Group | X | — | X | X | X |
| Kemet | X | X | X | X | — |
| NCC-Matsuo | X | X | X | X | X |
| NEC/Tokin | X | X | — | — | — |
| NIC | X | X | — | — | — |
| ROHM | X | X | — | — | — |
| YMIN | - | - | X | X | X |
| Samsung Electro-Mechanics | X | X | — | — | — |
| Vishay | X | X | X | X | X |

=== Uses ===
The low leakage and high capacity of tantalum capacitors favor their use in sample and hold circuits to achieve long hold duration, and some long duration timing circuits where precise timing is not critical. They are also often used for power supply rail decoupling in parallel with film or ceramic capacitors which provide low ESR and low reactance at high frequency. Tantalum capacitors can replace aluminum electrolytic capacitors in situations where the external environment or dense component packing results in a sustained hot internal environment and where high reliability is important. Equipment such as medical electronics and space equipment that require high quality and reliability makes use of tantalum capacitors.

An especially common application for low-voltage tantalum capacitors is power supply filtering on computer motherboards and in peripherals, due to their small size and long-term reliability.

== See also ==
- Aluminum electrolytic capacitor
- Coltan mining and ethics
- Electrolytic capacitor
- List of capacitor manufacturers
- Niobium capacitor
- Polymer capacitor
- Solid aluminum capacitor (SAL)
- Surface-mount technology
- Types of capacitor
