= Coltan =

Tantalum-niobium ore

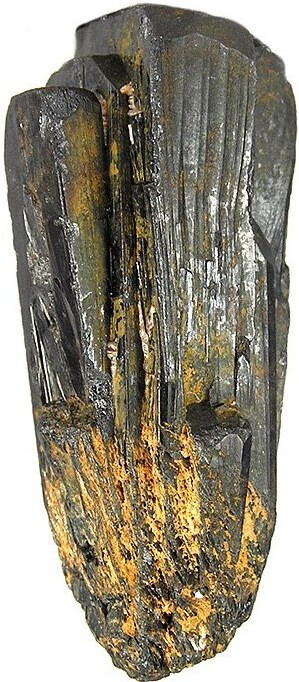
A piece of columbite–tantalite, size 6.0 × 2.5 × 2.1 cm

Coltan (short for columbite–tantalite and known industrially as tantalite) is a dull black metallic ore from which the elements niobium and tantalum are extracted. The niobium-dominant mineral in coltan is columbite (after niobium's original name columbium), and the tantalum-dominant mineral is tantalite.

Among other uses, tantalum from coltan is used to manufacture tantalum capacitors which are used for mobile phones, personal computers, automotive electronics, and cameras. Niobium is used in the manufacture of MRI magnets and as an additive to steel. Coltan mining is widespread in the Democratic Republic of the Congo.

== Production and supply ==

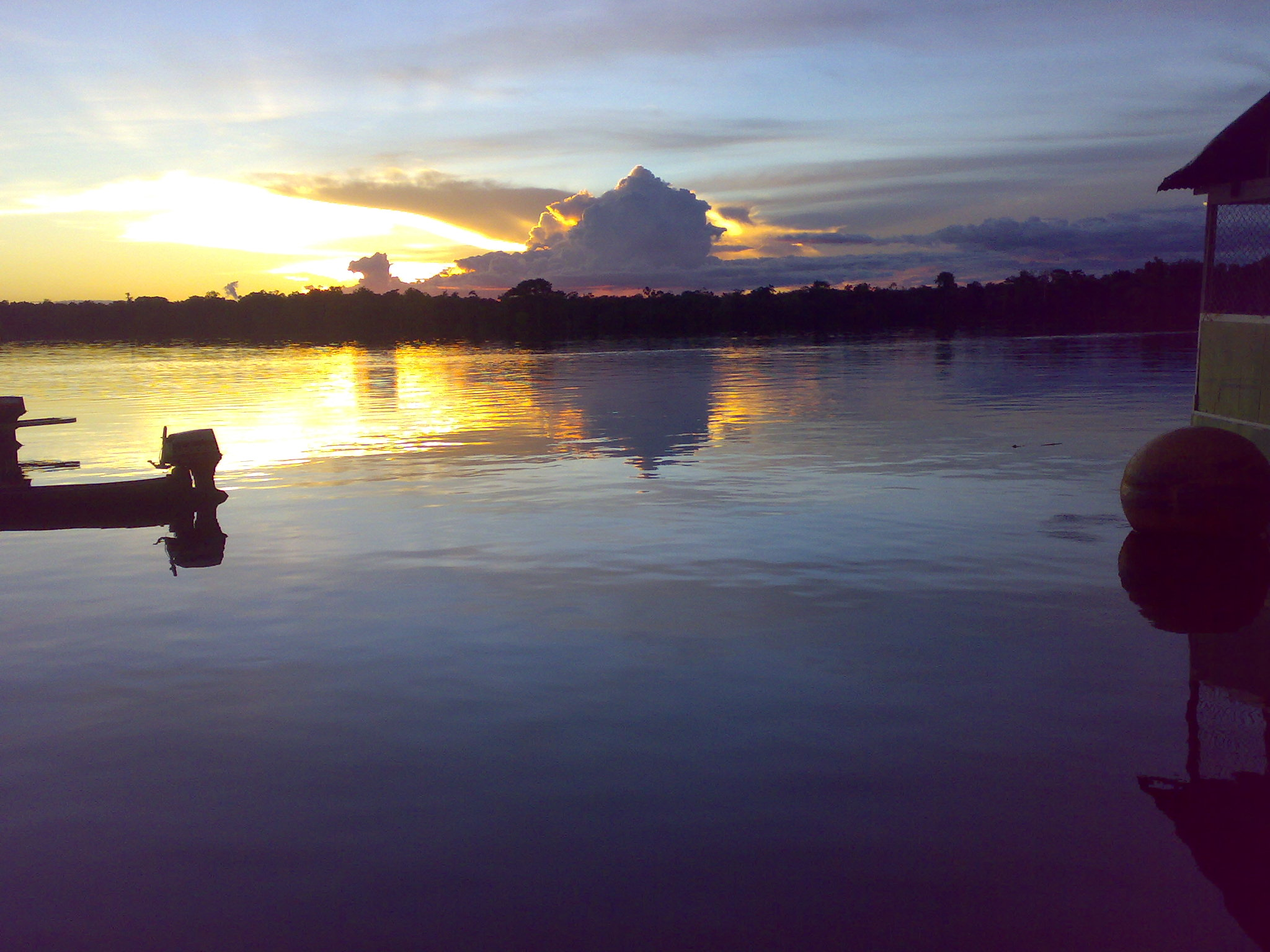
Rio Inírida

Approximately 71% of the global tantalum supply in 2008 was newly mined, 20% was from recycling, and the remainder was from tin slag and inventory. Tantalum minerals are mined in the Democratic Republic of the Congo, Colombia, Rwanda, Australia, Brazil, China, Ethiopia, Mozambique and Kenya. Tantalum is also produced in Thailand and Malaysia as a by-product of tin mining and smelting. Potential future mines, in descending order of magnitude, are being explored in Egypt, Greenland, China, Australia, Finland, Canada, Nigeria and Brazil.

Globally, 60% of all mining companies have registered with the highly regulated stock exchanges in Toronto and Vancouver. However, due to environmental regulations, no mining of coltan is currently taking place in Canada itself, with the exception of a single proposed mine in Blue River, British Columbia. In Canada, Tanco Mine near Bernic Lake in Manitoba has tantalum reserves, is the world's largest producer of caesium, and is operated by Global Advanced Metals Pty Ltd. A discussion of Canadian mining by Natural Resources Canada, updated in 2017, does not mention either coltan or tantalum. A Rwandan official discussing prospective mines in his country said that Canada had 4% of global production in 2009; but in rock so hard that the ore is too expensive to extract. In 2009, Rwanda had 9% of the world's tantalum production.

In 2016, Rwanda accounted for 50% of global tantalum production. In 2016, Rwanda announced that AB Minerals Corporation would open a coltan separation plant in Rwanda by mid-2017, the first to operate on the African continent. Uganda and Rwanda both exported coltan in the early 2000s after they invaded the DRC, but the bulk of this coltan was not mined within those countries but smuggled from Congolese mines, according to the final report of the UN Panel of Experts on the Illegal Exploitation of Natural Resources and Other Forms of Wealth in the Democratic Republic of Congo.

In 2013, Highland African Mining Company (HAMC), now Noventa, closed its Marropino mine in the Gilé District of Zambézia Province, Mozambique, citing poor-quality infrastructure and ore that was both very radioactive and mostly depleted. HAMC was losing US$3.00 on every ton extracted and had reported accumulated losses of around US$150 million by June 2013.

Reserves have been identified in Afghanistan, but the ongoing war there precludes either general exploration or exploring specifically for coltan for the foreseeable future. The United States does not produce tantalum due to the poor quality of its reserves.

Australian mining company Sons of Gwalia once produced half the world's tantalum but went into administration in 2004. Talison Minerals paid $205 million to buy the Wodgina and Greenbushes tantalum business of Sons of Gwalia but temporarily closed Wodgina because of falling tantalum prices. The mine re-opened in 2011 but closed again after less than a year. Atlas Iron began mining iron ore there in 2010 and ceased operations there in April 2017. Global Advanced Mining announced in 2018 that it planned to restart tantalum production at the Greenbushes mine within a year. Talison Lithium, 51% owned by Chinese company Tianqi Lithium Industries, Inc. (SZSE:002466) and 49% by the US-based Albemarle Corporation, will continue to mine lithium at Greenbushes in parallel with the GAM tantalum operation.

Venezuelan president Hugo Chávez announced in 2009 that a significant reserve of coltan was discovered in western Venezuela, although at least one coltan mining operation had previously been authorized in the area. Nonetheless, he outlawed private mines in the region and, saying that the FARC was financing itself with illegal mining, sent 15,000 troops in to deal with them. Technical advisers for the mining project were allegedly provided by a subsidiary of Khatam al-Anbiya Construction Headquarters, a fully owned enterprise of the Iranian Revolutionary Guard which had been under US sanctions since 25 October 2007.

Also in 2009, the Colombian government announced coltan reserves had been found in Colombia's eastern provinces. Director of the Colombian Police Oscar Naranjo Trujillo stated in October 2011 that the FARC and the Sinaloa Cartel are working together in the unlicensed coltan mining in Colombia. Colombia announced a joint operation with the United States to arrest three suspects who, according to Semana, inherited the illegal business run from their brother, Francisco Cifuentes Villa, alias 'Pancho Cifuentes', who once worked for Pablo Escobar. In 2012 Colombian police seized 17 tons of coltan in Guainía Department. The police said it had been mined on an indigenous reserve and bought for $10 a kilo and sold for $80 to 100 dollars a kilo, after smuggling it across the border into Brazil, where there are smelters, and sold on through the black market to buyers in Germany, Belgium, Kazakhstan and the United States. Colombia has 5% of global coltan reserves. One of the regions suffering from illegal gold and coltan mining in Colombia is the wetland known as Estrella Fluvial del Inírida (Inírida Fluvial Star), a Ramsar protected wetland.

Tonnes of tantalum mined
	1990	1991	1992	1993	1994	1995	1996	1997	1998	1999	2000	2001	2002	2003	2004	2005	2006	2007	2008	2009	2010	2011	2012	2013
Australia	165	218	224	170	238	274	276	302	330	350	485	660	940	765	807	854	478	441	557	81	0	80	0	0
Brazil	90	84	60	50	50	50	55	55	310	165	190	210	200	200	213	216	176	180	180	180	180	180	140	140
Canada	86	93	48	25	36	33	55	49	57	54	57	77	58	55	57	63	56	45	40	25	0	25	50	50
D.R. Congo	10	16	8	6	1	1	—	—	—N/a	—N/a	130	60	30	15	20	33	14	71	100	87	—N/a	—N/a	100	110
Rwanda	113	165	121	124	125	123	116	112	110	107	102	85	62	210	264	187	134	144	171	115	110	120	150	150
Africa, Other	45	66	59	59	8	3	3	3	82	76	208	173	242	245	333	214	146	135	313	297	391	390	230	140
WORLD	396	477	399	310	333	361	389	409	779	645	1070	1180	1470	1280	1430	1380	870	872	1190	670	681	790	670	590
1990–1993: U.S. Geological Survey, "1994 Minerals Yearbook" (MYB), "Columbium (niobium) and tantalum" by Larry D. Cunningham, Table 10; 1994–1997: MYB 1998, Table 10; 1998–2001: MYB 2002, p. 21.13; 2002–2003: MYB 2004, p. 20.13; 2004: MYB 2008, p. 52.12; 2005-2009: MYB 2009, p. 52.13. USGS did not report data for other countries (China, Kazakhstan, Russia, etc.) owing to data uncertainties.
—N/a Not available.	— Zero.																							

% of Global tantalum production from mining
	1990	1991	1992	1993	1994	1995	1996	1997	1998	1999	2000	2001	2002	2003	2004	2005	2006	2007	2008	2009	2010	2011	2012	2013
Australia	41.7%	45.7%	56.1%	54.8%	71.5%	75.9%	71.0%	73.8%	42.4%	54.3%	45.3%	55.9%	63.9%	59.8%	56.4%	61.9%	54.9%	50.6%	46.8%	12.1%	0.0%	10.1%	0.0%	0.0%
Brazil	22.7%	17.6%	15.0%	16.1%	15.0%	13.9%	14.1%	13.4%	39.8%	25.6%	17.8%	17.8%	13.6%	15.6%	14.9%	15.7%	20.2%	20.6%	15.1%	26.9%	26.4%	22.8%	20.9%	23.7%
Canada	21.7%	19.5%	12.0%	8.1%	10.8%	9.1%	14.1%	12.0%	7.3%	8.4%	5.3%	6.5%	3.9%	4.3%	4.0%	4.6%	6.4%	5.2%	3.4%	3.7%	0.0%	3.2%	7.5%	8.5%
D.R. Congo	2.5%	3.4%	2.0%	1.9%	0.3%	0.3%	0.0%	0.0%	0.0%	0.0%	12.1%	5.1%	2.0%	1.2%	1.4%	2.4%	1.6%	8.1%	8.4%	13.0%	—N/a	—N/a	14.9%	18.6%
Rwanda	—	—	—	—	—	—	—	—	—	—	—	—	—	—	—	—	—	—	—	—	16.2%	15.2%	22.4%	25.4%
Africa, Other	11.4%	13.8%	14.8%	19.0%	2.4%	0.8%	0.8%	0.7%	10.5%	11.8%	19.4%	14.7%	16.5%	19.1%	23.3%	15.5%	16.8%	15.5%	26.3%	44.3%	57.4%	49.4%	34.3%	23.7%
WORLD	100.0%	100.0%	100.0%	100.0%	100.0%	100.0%	100.0%	100.0%	100.0%	100.0%	100.0%	100.0%	100.0%	100.0%	100.0%	100.0%	100.0%	100.0%	100.0%	100.0%	100.0%	100.0%	100.0%	100.0%

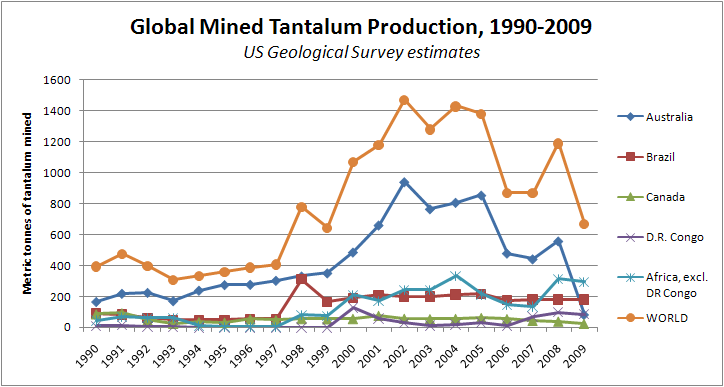
Data sources:

=== Democratic Republic of Congo ===
Conflicts in the Democratic Republic of Congo (DRC) have made it difficult for the DRC to benefit from the exploitation of its coltan reserves. Mining of coltan is mainly artisanal and small-scale and vulnerable to extortion and human trafficking. A 2003 UN Security Council report stated that much of the ore is mined illegally and smuggled across Congo's eastern border by militias from neighbouring Uganda, Burundi and Rwanda. All three countries named by the United Nations as coltan smugglers denied doing this. Austrian journalist Klaus Werner however has documented links between multi-national companies like Bayer and the smuggling and illegal coltan mines. A United Nations committee investigating the plunder of gems and minerals from the Congo, listed in its final report in 2003 approximately 125 companies and individuals whose business activities breach international norms. Companies accused of irresponsible corporate behavior included Cabot Corporation, Eagle Wings Resources International the Forrest Group and OM Group. Some of the fighters were eventually tried before the International Criminal Court tribunal in The Hague on charges of crimes against humanity.

Income from coltan smuggling likely financed the military occupation of Congo, and prolonged the civil conflict afterwards. A UN panel studied the eastern Congo for months before releasing a remarkably sharp condemnation of the ongoing military occupation of eastern Congo by Ugandan, Rwandan, and other foreign military forces, as well as the many bands of Congolese rebels fighting with one another. The UN report accused the fighters of massively looting Congolese natural resources, and said that the war persisted because the fighters were enriching themselves by mining and smuggling out coltan, timber, gold, and diamonds. They also said that smuggled minerals financed the fighting and provided money for weapons. A 2005 report on the Rwandan economy by the South African Institute for Security Studies found that Rwanda official coltan production soared nearly tenfold between 1999 and 2001, from 147 tons to 1,300 tons, and for the first time provided more revenue than from the country's traditional primary exports, tea and coffee. Similarly, Uganda exported 2.5 tons of coltan exports a year before the conflict broke out in 1997. In 1999 its export volume exploded to nearly 70 tons.

"Part of the increase in production is due to
the opening of new mines in Rwanda.
However, the increase is primarily due to
the fraudulent re-export of coltan of
Congolese origin."

Many of the corporations participating in the 1999-2000 business stampede caused by $400 coltan were in fact participants in the conflict. The Rwandan army, as Rwanda Metals, exported at least 100 tons per month. A UN panel estimated that the Coltan extraction causes problems that adjoin or overlap those caused by blood diamonds and uses similar methods such as smuggling across the porous Rwandan border, environmentalists and human rights workers began to speak of "conflict minerals" or "conflict resources" more generally. It is difficult to verify the sourcing of fungible materials like ores, so some processors, Cabot Corporation (USA) for example, have announced that they would avoid unsourced Central African coltan altogether. The Rwandan army could have made $20 million a month, and must have made at least $250 million over 18 months. "This is substantial enough to finance the war," the panel noted in its report.

"Here lies the vicious circle of the war.
Coltan has permitted the Rwandan army
to sustain its presence in the Democratic
Republic of the Congo. The army has
provided protection and security to the
individuals and companies extracting the
mineral. These have made money which is
shared with the army, which in turn
continues to provide the enabling
environment to continue the
exploitation."

In 2009, DRC coltan was going to China to be manufactured into wires and electronic-grade tantalum powder. Coltan imports from the DRC into Europe usually went to Russia or Central/Eastern Europe, via the route through Dar es Salaam in Tanzania and Piraeus in Greece to the Balkans. An offshore consortium registered in the British Virgin Islands named Nova Dies controlled most of the trans-Balkan trade route. This export pipeline mostly carries unprocessed coltan mined in unsafe artisanal mines, so this market hinders development of safer extraction infrastructure in the DRC. The Balkan trade route, therefore, poses a long-term threat to the DRC's economy; it finances and validates the vast harm done to DR Congo by the violent and corrupt past and current system.

Estimates of Congo's coltan deposits range upwards from 64% of global reserves. but estimates at the high end of the range are difficult to trace to reliable data. Professional bodies like the British Geological Survey estimate that Central Africa as a whole has 9% of global assets. Tantalum, the primary element extracted from coltan, can also be obtained from other sources, but Congolese coltan represented around 10% of world production in 2008.

The United States responded to conflict minerals with section 1501 of the 2010 Dodd-Frank Act, which required companies that might have conflict minerals including Coltan in their supply chain to register with the US Securities and Exchange Commission and disclose their suppliers. The legislation appears to have had limited success. Based on extensive qualitative fieldwork conducted from 2014 to 2016 with coltan buyers operating in Bukama Territory, Kalemie and Lubumbashi, Katanga Province, one researcher suggested that conflict mineral reforms resulted in better oversight and organization of supply chains, but that inaction by the Congolese government had led to locally negotiated solutions and territorialization, leading to secretive mining activities.

== Use and demand ==
Coltan is used primarily for the production of tantalum capacitors, used in mobile phones and almost every kind of electronic device. Niobium and tantalum have a wide range of uses, including refractive lenses for glasses, cameras, phones and printers. They are also used in semiconductor circuits, and capacitors for small electronic devices such as hearing aids, pacemakers, and MP3 players, as well as in computer hard drives, automobile electronics, and surface acoustic wave SAW filters for mobile phones.

Coltan is also used to make high-temperature alloys for jet engines, air-based turbines, and land-based turbines. More recently, in the late 2000s, the nickel-tantalum super-alloys used in jet engines account for 15% of tantalum consumption, but pending orders for the Airbus and the 787 Dreamliner may increase this proportion, as well as China's pending order for 62 787-8 airplanes.

Some companies have taken steps to reduce their use of coltan as a conflict mineral by tracing the source of minerals in their supply chains, auditing smelters, and certifying conflict-free coltan mines. The efficacy of these efforts is limited because about half of the minerals ultimately exported from conflict areas like the Democratic Republic of Congo are traded informally and not traceable. Some of this informal economy is also one of the few sources of income for people in the conflict zones.

=== Resource curse ===
Certain countries rich in natural resources have been said to suffer from the apparently paradoxical "resource curse" - showing worse economic development than countries with fewer resources. Wealth of resources may also correspond to "... the likelihood of weak democratic development, corruption, and civil war". High levels of corruption lead to great political instability because whoever controls the assets (usually the political leaders and the government, in the case of the Democratic Republic of the Congo) can use them for their own benefit. The resources generate wealth, which the leaders use to stay in power "... either through legal means, or coercive ones (e.g. funding militias)". The increased importance of coltan in electronics "occurred as warlords and armies in the eastern Congo converted artisanal mining operations ... into slave labour regimes to earn hard currency to finance their militias," as one anthropological study put it in 2008. When much of eastern Congo came under the control of Rwandan forces in the 1990s, Rwanda suddenly became a major exporter of coltan, benefiting from the weakness of the Congolese government. The soaring price "brought in as much as $20 million a month to rebel groups" and other factions trading coltan mined in northeastern Congo, according to a U.N. report.

=== Mining ===
For Congolese, mining is the readiest source of income, because the work is consistently available, even if only for the equivalent of one US dollar a day. The work can be laborious; miners can walk for days into the forest to reach the ore, scratch it from the earth with hand tools, and pan it. About 90% of young men in Congo have done this. Research found that many Congolese leave farming because they need money quickly and cannot wait for crops to grow. Farming also presents its own obstacles. For example, the lack of roads in the Congolese interior makes it extremely difficult to transport produce to market and a harvest can be seized by militias or the military. With their food gone, people resort to mining to survive. But organized mines may be run by corrupt groups such as militias. The Congolese mine coltan with few tools, no safety procedures, and often no mining experience. No government aid or intervention is available in many unethical and abusive circumstances. Miners consider coltan mining a way to provide for themselves in the face of widespread war and conflict and a government that has no concern for their welfare.

A 2007 study of the radioactivity of the coltan mined in Masisi and other parts of the North Kivu Province found "that grinding and sieving coltan can give rise to high occupational doses, up to 18 mSv per year on average."

== Environmental concerns ==
Uncontrolled mining in the DRC causes soil erosion and pollutes lakes and rivers, affecting the hydrology and ecology of the region.

The eastern mountain gorilla's population has diminished as well. Miners, far from food sources and often hungry, hunt gorillas. The gorilla population in the DRC fell from 17,000 to 5,000 in the decade prior to 2009, and Mountain Gorillas in the Great Lakes region numbered only 700, UNEP said in 2009. Hunted for bushmeat, a prized delicacy in western Africa, and threatened by logging, slash-and-burn agriculture and armed conflict, the gorilla population was critically endangered, they said. The population of Grauer's gorillas were particularly threatened by changes in their environment, with a population in January 2018 of only about 3,800.

An estimated 3–5 million tons of bushmeat is obtained by killing animals, including gorillas, every year. Demand for bushmeat comes from urban dwellers who consider it a delicacy, as well as from remote populations of artisanal miners. Environmentalists who interviewed miners in and around Kahuzi-Biéga National Park and the Itombwe Nature Reserve found that the miners did confirm that they had been eating bushmeat and that they did think that the practice had caused a decline in primate numbers. Since the miners said they would cease the practice if they had another food supply, the authors suggested that efforts to stop the gorilla population decline should consider addressing this issue to reduce the depredations of subsistence hunting. The mines in these nature reserves were producing cassiterite, gold, coltan and wolframite, and "most mines were controlled by armed groups."

== Health concerns ==
There is a high prevalence of respiratory complaints in Congolese informal coltan miners. It has been suggested that efficient occupational safety measures be implemented. Also, there is a need to regulate the informal mining business due to a high death toll.

== See also ==
- Conflict minerals
- Fairphone
- Mining industry of the Democratic Republic of the Congo
- Cobalt
- Cassiterite
- Mining in Australia
