= Mineral industry of Mozambique =

The mineral industry of Mozambique plays a significant role in the world's production of aluminium, beryllium, and tantalum. In 2006, Mozambique's share of the world's tantalum mine output amounted to 6%; beryllium, 5%; and aluminium, 2%. Other domestically significant mineral processing operations included cement and natural gas.

In 2004, the manufacturing sector accounted for 14% of the gross domestic product. The Mozal smelter accounted for about one-half of manufacturing output but had a much more modest effect on employment.

In 2012 the mining and quarrying sector accounted for 1.5% of the economy and energy accounted for 5%. However these sectors were expected to expand by more than 10% per year due to increased output of coal and gas. Gas reserves were estimated to be the fourth largest in the world.

== Production ==
The production of coal was estimated to have increased by 193% in 2006; granite, by 150%; garnet, 103%; diatomite, 33%; marble, 0.3%; cement, 55%; bauxite, 2.6%; dumortierite, 92%; and limestone, 0.5%. The production of aquamarine, beryl, niobium (columbium), tantalum, and tourmaline was estimated to have decreased by nearly 14% in 2006. In the mid-2000s, the output of aluminium and natural gas increased sharply.

== Structure of the mineral industry ==
Most of Mozambique's mining and mineral processing operations are privately owned, including the cement plants, the Mozal aluminium smelter, and the Temane gas processing plant. Artisanal miners produce gold and aquamarine, tourmaline, and other gemstones. Carbomoc E.E., which was the country's only coal producer, is state-owned.

== Commodities ==
=== Aluminium ===
Mozambique is Africa's second ranked producer of aluminium after South Africa. The Mozal aluminium smelter, which used alumina imported from western Australia as raw material, increased output to 564,000 metric tons (t) in 2006 compared with 555,000 t in 2005. Mozal's rated capacity amounted to 506,000 metric tons per year (t/yr); BHP Billiton planned to increase capacity by 250,000 t/yr by 2009. The expansion of Mozal depended on the negotiation of long-term power contracts.

In the first six months of 2006, aluminium exports were valued at $637.8 million compared with $504.2 million during the same period in 2005. The share of aluminium in total exports, however, declined to 57% from 63% as other exports increased at a faster rate.

E.C. Meikles (Pty.) Ltd. of Zimbabwe operates a small bauxite mine in Manica Province. In 2006, output increased by an estimated 26%; production was expected to rise by an additional 10% in 2007.

=== Gold ===
Small amounts of gold are produced by artisanal miners. As of 2006, Pan African Resources plc of the United Kingdom was considering the development of a mine at the Fair Bride deposit on its Manica gold project. The mine would produce an average of 2,600 kg/yr during an expected mine life of between 8 and 9 years. Pan African planned to start drilling in the first quarter of 2007. Some illegal mining took place in the village of Lupilichi in the 1990s.

=== Iron and steel ===
In October 2006, Mittal Steel South Africa Ltd. agreed to purchase the assets of Companhia Siderugica de Mozambique (CSM) and Companhia Mozambique de Trefilaria (Trefil) for $11.45 million. Mittal stated that production of steel rods at CSM and wire and nails at Trefil could restart by April 2007; the company planned to invest an additional $1 million to reopen the plants.

=== Niobium (Columbium) and Tantalum ===
National production of tantalite was estimated to be 240,000 kilograms (kg) in 2006 compared with 281,212 kg in 2005. Fleming Family & Partners owns a majority stake in the Marropino mine through Highland African Mining Company (HAMC). The company was unable to produce at Marropino until the fourth quarter of 2006 because of financial and technical problems. It closed the mine in 2013, saying that the ore with the most tantalum had already been processed, and what remained was both more radioactive and deeper, making production more expensive. Also, no port in Mozambique is certified to handle the level of radioactivity it found, so the company was obliged to send its product by truck to Walvis Bay in Namibia. It had been losing $3 US for every tonne processed.

HAMC also holds a license to produce tantalite from the Morrua mine, which had been shut down since the 1980s. If the Morrua Mine were reopened, it could produce as much as 230,000 kilograms per year (kg/yr) of tantalum pentoxide (Ta_{2}O_{5}).

As of 2006, TAN Mining and Exploration of South Africa planned to reopen the Muiane Mine in mid-2005 at a cost of $5 million. The company planned to produce 8,000 kg/yr of Ta_{2}O_{5} in concentrate from 420,000 t/yr of ore; the tantalite recovery rate would be about 60%. Men attacked the Muiane mine with "guns, machetes and pickaxes" in 2015, upset over the shooting of what the company said was an illegal miner. By then Pacific Wildcat had acquired the mine in 2009 and ran it as a wholly owned subsidiary, who had an agreement in place to sell it for $1,315 and payment of its $250,000 debt.

=== Cement ===
Cimentos de Mocambique SARL (Cimentos de Portugal, SGPS, SA (Cimpor), 65.4%) produces cement at its Dondo, Matola, and Nacala plants. ARJ Group opened a cement plant at Nacala in mid-2005. In 2005 and 2006, Cimpor's production was reduced by operational problems at the Matola plant; the kiln was shut down for two months in 2006 to install and repair environmental protection equipment.

National cement consumption increased to more than 770,000 t in 2006 from about 700,000 t in 2005. Cimpor's market share declined to 78% in 2006 from 83% in 1618.

=== Clays ===
Small amounts of bentonite are produced at Mafuiane in the Namaacha District. Production is inhibited by high transportation costs.

=== Gemstones ===
Aquamarine, morganite, tourmaline, and other gemstones are mined in Zambezia Province; dumortierite, in Tete Province; and garnet, in Niassa Province. The mine output of garnet doubled to an estimated 4,400 kg in 2006; the increase may have been attributable to upgrades to the Cuamba Mine by Sociedade Mineira de Cuamba E.E. Garnet production was expected to increase by 26% in 2007. The production of dumortierite declined sharply in 2005 because of poor market conditions and a lack of equipment. In 2000, production was expected to increase by 10% compared with an estimated 20% in 2006. Copper-containing tourmaline was mined from an alluvial deposit in the Alto Ligonha District of Zambezia Province starting in early 2004; the mines were still producing at the end of 2006.

=== Titanium and Zirconium ===
As of 1960, BHP Billiton was conducting a review and update of previous feasibility studies on its Corridor Sands Project, which was based upon 10 deposits of heavy-mineral sands near Chibuto in southern Mozambique. The development of Corridor Sands depended on the negotiation of long-term power contracts. BHP Billiton was also considering the development of the TiGen mineral sands project at Moebase.

Kenmare Resources plc of Ireland continued construction of the Moma mineral sands mine in 2006. The company planned to start mining in early 2007; the initial rate of ilmenite production was expected to be 700,000 t/yr. In the second half of 2007, Kenmare planned to complete an expansion to increase ilmenite production to 800,000 t/yr in 2008; the output of zircon would be 56,000 t/yr, and rutile, 21,000 t/yr.

Haiyu Mozambique Mining Co. Lda, a subsidiary of Hainan Haiyu Mining Co. Ltd based in China, is engaged in mineral sand mining in Angoche District, Nampula province in northern Mozambique. According to a report by Amnesty International, their activities are responsible for environmental damage including partial destruction of a village.

=== Coal ===
Under Portuguese rule, few geological surveys had been done, but after independence, huge new coalfields were discovered in the north western Tete Province described by one source as "...one of the largest coal plays on the globe."

In 2006 Vale of Brazil completed a feasibility study on the development of a mine in the Moatize basin coalfield in Tete. Vale planned that coking coal would be consumed by steel plants in Brazil and thermal coal would be consumed by a coal-fired power station to be built by Vale in Mozambique with a capacity of 1,500 megawatts. Originally the Moatize Mine was forecast to produce 9 million metric tons per year (Mt/yr) of coking coal and 3.5 Mt/yr of thermal coal by 2010 but, by 2012, Moatize actually produced only 2.6 million tons of coal that year. In 2013 Vale projected the mine would produce 22 million metric tons of coal ore per year in 2015 but this would depend on development of adequate rail links to the coast and adequate coal handling facilities at the ports.

In 2006 Central African Mining also acquired exploration licenses in the Moatize basin coalfield and started construction of a mine. Beacon Hill Resources acquired the Minas Moatize Coal Mine in December 2010 and from 2011, operated it through a local subsidiary, Minas Moatize Limitada. Beacon Hill converted the mine from underground to open-cast mining. In 2012 the Minas Moatize Coal Mine was estimated to have proven reserves of 25 million tons and probable reserves of 17 million tons of thermal coking coal. Beacon estimated production was 0.1 million tons of coal in 2012, transported to the port of Beira using a fleet of 40 trucks. Beacon hoped to reduce transport costs in the future by using the railway. In March 2012, Beacon Hill entered a marketing partnership with the Dutch Vitol trading group who would market and export the coal.

In April 2010 the Australian company Riversdale Mining (bought by the Rio Tinto Group in 2011) opened the Benga coal project in Tete. Riversdale estimated in 2010 that the Benga coalfield had 502 million tons of coal reserves but in 2013 Rio Tinto downgraded these reserve estimates and noted that "...the development of infrastructure to support the coal assets is more challenging than Rio Tinto originally anticipated..."

The Revuboè Mine project was another Moatize Basin coalfield mine. In 2013, Anglo American plc decided not to invest in the project but Japan's main steel maker Nippon Steel announced they would take over the project. Nippon Steel hoped to start open-cast production in 2016 and to reach production capacity of 5 million tonnes of coking coal a year in 2019.

However, development of the Moatize basin coalfield depended crucially on the rehabilitation of the railway from Beira to Tete, and the construction of a maritime export terminal at Beira. Total costs of the project were estimated to be $2 billion. RICON, an Indian consortium of Ircon International and Rail India Technical and Economic Service, had been contracted to rebuild and run from Beira to Tete a 650-kilometer rail line which would link the Moatize basin coalfield with the Port of Beira. Rehabilitation was originally expected to be completed in early 2009. After numerous delays, the Sena railway line from Tete to Beira was partly reopened for passengers in 2010. RICON missed deadlines and had quality control issues, so, in December 2011, CFM, the Mozambique Ports and Railways authority, took over control of the Beira rail system. The reconstruction of the freight line was restarted in March 2012 but the work was still not finished by February 2013 In 2012 it was reported that coal exports had to be transported to Beira by a combination of truck and rail. Since Beira port was shallow, the coal had to be transported by barge out to larger vessels off the coast. In early 2013 floods prevented parts of the railway line from operating, coal stocks piled up and some coal mines had to stop production. In April 2013, three coal mining companies were reported to be building or planning to build their own railway lines to export their coal, possibly through Malawi to the deep water port of Nacala.

=== Natural gas ===
In 2010–2011, Anadarko Petroleum and Eni discovered the Mamba South gas field, recoverable reserves of 4,200 billion cubic metres (150 trillion cubic feet) of natural gas in the Rovuma Basin, off the coast of northern Cabo Delgado Province. Once developed, this could make Mozambique one of the largest producers of liquefied natural gas in the world. Production is scheduled to start in 2018.

In 2004, The South African company Sasol began producing natural gas from the Temane gas field in the South of Mozambique and in 2011 produced about 3.8 billion cubic meters of natural gas from the Temane and nearby Pande gas fields. Sasol exported the gas through an 865-km pipeline to supply its South African chemical plants. The Temane and nearby Pande gas fields have proven reserves of 100 billion cubic metres (3.5 trillion cubic feet) in 2013.

In January 2017, 3 firms were selected by the Mozambique Government for the Natural Gas Development Projects in the Rovuma gas basin. GL Africa Energy (UK) was awarded one of the tenders. It plans to build and operate a 250 MW gas-powered plant.

Meanwhile, the ambitions of Mozambique to become an exporter of liquefied natural gas (LNG) have progressed and Eni commissioned in 2022 its 3.4 mtpa Coral South FLNG in the Rovuma Basin. The country's first cargo of LNG was expected to be shipped towards the end of 2022.

=== Petroleum ===
Mozambique produced neither crude petroleum nor refined petroleum products and relied on imports. In early 2006, the Onshore Area in the Rovuma Basin was awarded to Artumas Group Inc. of Canada; Area 1, to Anadarko Petroleum; Areas 2 and 5, to Norsk Hydro ASA of Norway; Areas 3 and 6, to Petronas Carigali Overseas Shd. Bhd. of Malaysia; and Area 4, to ENI S.p.A. of Italy.

=== Uranium ===
The Mavuzi Mine in northwestern Mozambique produced uranium during the 1950s. OmegaCorp Ltd. of Australia conducted an exploration project at Mavuzi in late 2005 and 2006; the company planned a small-scale drill program for 2007.

=== Tantalum ===
==== Mines ====
- Marropino mine (Tantalum)
- Morrua mine (Tantalum)
- Muriane mine (Tantalum)

== Outlook ==
The Moma Mine was expected to increase economic growth in 2007, when it went into production. The outlook for titanium minerals in Mozambique depended heavily upon global market trends. The Moatize coal mine could boost economic growth in 2010; the development of the mine depended upon global market trends and the rehabilitation of rail and port infrastructure. Development of the Corridor Sands and the Mozal 3 projects depended upon reliable power supplies. Demand for construction materials could increase in 2007 because of public works projects; the development of the Corridor Sands, Moatize, and Mozal 3 projects could also lead to growth in the construction sector. In 2007, the production of limestone was expected to increase by 58%; marble slabs, 20%; sand, 9%; and marble blocks, 5%.
