= Morrua mine =

Mine in Zambezia, Mozambique

- Location: Zambezia Province, Mozambique
- Products: Tantalum

The Morrua mine is a large mine located in the northern part of Mozambique in Zambezia Province. Morrua represents one of the largest tantalum reserves in Mozambique having estimated reserves of 7.5 million tonnes of ore grading 0.07% tantalum. Murrua town is located near the mine.

== See also ==
- Mineral industry of Mozambique
