= Muriane mine =

Tantalum mine in Zambezia, Mozambique

- Location: Zambezia Province, Mozambique
- Products: Tantalum

The Muriane mine is a large mine located in the northern part of Mozambique in Zambezia Province. Muriane represents one of the largest tantalum reserves in Mozambique having estimated reserves of 7 million tonnes of ore grading 0.016% tantalum.

== See also ==
- Mineral industry of Mozambique
