= Revuboè coal mine =

Coal mine in Tete, Tete Province, Mozambique

Revuboè Coal Mine
- Location: Tete, Tete Province, Mozambique
- Products: Coking coal

The Revuboè Coal Mine is a coal mine located in Tete, Changara District, Tete Province, Mozambique. The mine has coal reserves amounting to 1.4 billion tonnes of coking coal, one of the largest coal reserves in Africa and the world and has an annual production of 5 million tonnes of coal.

== See also ==
- Mineral industry of Mozambique
