= Coltan mining and ethics =

Overview of human rights violations associated with the mining of columbite-tantalum

Coltan is the colloquial name for the mineral columbite-tantalum ("col-tan"). In the early 21st century coltan mining is associated with human rights violations such as child labour, systematic exploitation of the population by governments or militant groups, exposure to toxic chemicals and other hazards as a result of lax environmental protection, and general safety laws and regulations. Coltan mining in Venezuela, especially in the Orinoco Mining Arc, has led to deforestation, water contamination, and human rights violations. Issues like forced labor, Indigenous displacement, and corruption highlight broader challenges of neoextractivism and conflict mineral regulation.

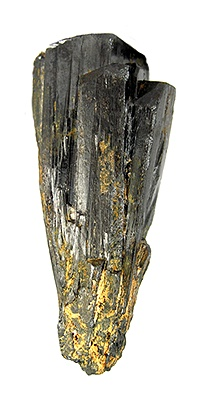
A piece of Coltan

== Overview ==
The coltan industry is worth tens of millions of dollars a year. The price for coltan ranged between $50 and $200 per pound in 2012 and has spiked much higher in the past when supplies were scarce. In 2006, Australia, Brazil, and Canada produced 80% of the world's coltan. As of 2018, coltan's main producers are Rwanda, the Democratic Republic of the Congo (DRC), Nigeria, Brazil and China. Australia, Canada and Mozambique are also important players. Thus, the task of supplying world coltan needs has fallen largely on conflict regions and underdeveloped countries. The coltan market is characterized by opacity, as supply and trade is based on contracts that do not publish public price references. The products are sold in private, unregulated markets, unlike commodity metals like gold, copper, zinc, and tin.

The United Nations has taken an active role in assessing the state of the world's coltan industry and in 2003 has cited specifically the DRC as an example of a country where natural resource exploitation, "The flow of arms, exploitation and the continuation of the conflict are inextricably linked."

== Ethical issues ==
=== Human rights ===
Some notable similarities link mining practices in countries where they have come under fire:

- systematic exploitation of workers.
- dangerous working conditions.

The UN also considers developed countries that support conflict minerals violators of human rights for allowing the violations to continue rather than fulfilling and promoting the human rights set forth in the 1948 Declaration.

==== Working conditions ====
The UN has declared a right to choose one's employment and has also called safe working conditions a basic human right. The violence in the regions that produce conflict coltan gives the population little choice about whether to mine coltan. In Central Africa, for example, gold mines are typically connected to militias.

==== Forced and child labour ====
According to some activists, coltan mines in national reserves often forcibly use indigenous people for their operations. In Colombia - a very minor coltan producing country - the Puinawai natives call the coltan mines “guns, pointed at the earth beneath [the] sacred mountain." A report by the Commission of the European Union in 2011 raised issues of child labour in coltan mining in DRC, and in the recycling industry in Ghana and China.

Twenty years ago it was reported that children as young as twelve were working in some mines. Amnesty International, in a joint investigation with African NGO African Resources Watch, in 2016 published a report that found that children even as young as seven years old are working in cobalt mines in the DRC. The report says that children were beaten and forced to pay "fines" to state officials as bribes for money extortion and intimidation. Furthermore, a lack of protective gear, and long working hours were lamented. Cobalt (element Co) mining is a totally different supply chain to coltan mining (elements Ta and Nb) and there is no geological overlap of resources or mines.

=== Mining and economic development ===
Many of the burgeoning coltan producers are resource-rich developing countries with economies that are currently largely dependent on mining non-renewable resources. This indicates a danger attached to even clean coltan operations in developing countries. Groups that study developing nations such as Oxfam caution against a developing country putting much of its capital into mining operations, especially single mineral developments. While countries like the United States, Canada, and Australia were able to turn their mining operations into profitable industries, these experiences are not practical models that would support today's developing countries’ reliance on mining operations for further economic development. These countries’ dependence on mining creates tension due to the relatively small size of the developing countries and their exploitation of nonrenewable resources at the expense of their other natural resources. This land tension typically leads to poor economic performance and political instability, which in turn creates the conflicts that make coltan an ethically charged commodity.

=== Environmental concerns ===
In addition to the human rights issues attached to the coltan industry, the mining process itself can be environmentally hazardous. Since it is usually pan-mined, the mining process and slurry from this process can contaminate water and may be harmful to ecosystems, although since no chemicals are added to process the minerals it is relatively benign. However, while the exact effects of prolonged coltan exposure through dust around particularly artisanal mines have not yet been studied in detail, more DNA damage was found in children living in mining areas than in those from control groups. Preliminary results of an ongoing study also hint that babies born to miners suffer "an increased risk of birth defects." Other risks include acidic drainage and the presence of toxic metals such as nickel and substances like arsenic and cyanide. Air pollution is also a concern.

Some people question the sustainability of artisanal mining, but miners often are very poor and have few other options to earn a living. Illegal mining in national parks and land reserves can be especially damaging, such as the Kahuzi-Biéga National Park in the DRC and the Puinawai National Reserve in Colombia, due to the deep forest cover these places provide. Coltan is mined using techniques developed for gold mining in the 1800s. The work is difficult and dangerous, with workers panning for coltan in large craters in stream beds, with the average worker producing less than one kilogram of coltan a day.

Coltan mines operate under boom-bust economics and not only strip the mineral from the land, but also cause environmental degradation. In mining towns that depend on coltan for their wealth, fewer people cultivate the land. Numerous instances of famine related to the mining operations contribute to increasingly unsustainable types for land use. Besides the harm it does to food security in the eastern Congo, coltan mining is inimical to land uses such as ecotourism, game ranches, and medical research which could possibly provide better incomes and profit from the wildlife and forest land. Mining threatens the national parks across the Congo.

Developing nations often go through with mining operations because they need the capital these operations bring without thinking of the environmental impacts. Given that mining is an expensive venture to undertake, the returns are sometimes low. Civil societies who study developing nations, such as Oxfam, have stated that the cost of mining on the environment can cause nearly permanent environmental damage, which can leave a developing nation permanently poorer, and that support for mining should only be offered in countries that have a clearly defined plan for using the revenue gained from mining for the promotion of public health and infrastructure investments that will eventually allow them to become less resource-dependent.

The World Wide Fund for Nature (WWF) and the UN advocate for extractive activity to stop in UNESCO World Heritage sites and in proposed protected areas within conservation sites, in areas with last remaining examples of unique ecosystems, and in places where mining threatens the well-being of local communities and indigenous peoples.

=== Criminal activity ===
==== Smuggling ====
Rwandan coltan comes mostly from mines in the DRC, usually in the conflict areas adjacent to the Rwandan border. Only four of the ten largest Rwandan mining companies have taken any measures to verify whether their product is conflict-sourced. Rwanda has been implicated multiple times in smuggling Congolese coltan by UN investigators, as have Burundi and Uganda. Uganda and Burundi however do not export coltan, so the UN has found it difficult to verify that the smuggling is still taking place. About half of exported Rwandan coltan comes from conflict regions in the DRC.

Many countries export their raw coltan to China for further processing. The UN reports that many tons of coltan from the DRC are processed through China and are often mixed with samples from conflict-free regions to produce tainted coltan that is more difficult to source. This practice undermines the efforts made by countries with legislation restricting conflict materials, such as the United States and Canada.

==== Cartels ====
In Colombia, the coltan mining industry is involved in numerous internal conflicts and is currently illegal. This has not stopped guerilla forces and militia groups from mining the ore and selling it on the black market or shipping it to China. The Colombian government has made little attempt to regulate the industry. In 2010, plans were announced to auction off the rights to mine coltan in certain areas, but those plans were never completed and were dropped by the current administration. Most of the coltan activity takes place in the deep jungle areas along the Southeastern borders of Venezuela or Brazil, causing severe environmental repercussions. Colombia's coltan mines are often located in national parks and on indigenous territory, which forces the native population into the mining industry. Colombian coltan is tied to violence at every step of the process. The mines are typically owned by paramilitary groups or drug cartels such as the Sinaloa cartel and the Cifuentes Villa family, who use the same smugglers to move both drugs and coltan. Colombian authorities have little control over the coltan mining region due to its size and density, and coltan is easily moved along the same routes as cocaine and emeralds, two of Colombia's most heavily trafficked illegal goods.

In Venezuela, the government has sent military patrols into the jungle to root out illegal mining activities and the Colombian cartel leaders who fund these operations. As in Colombia, indigenous Venezuelans in the Parguaza region have suffered from the mining industry, and people have suffered violence from the coltan mine's military supervisors.

== Coltan mining in Venezuela ==
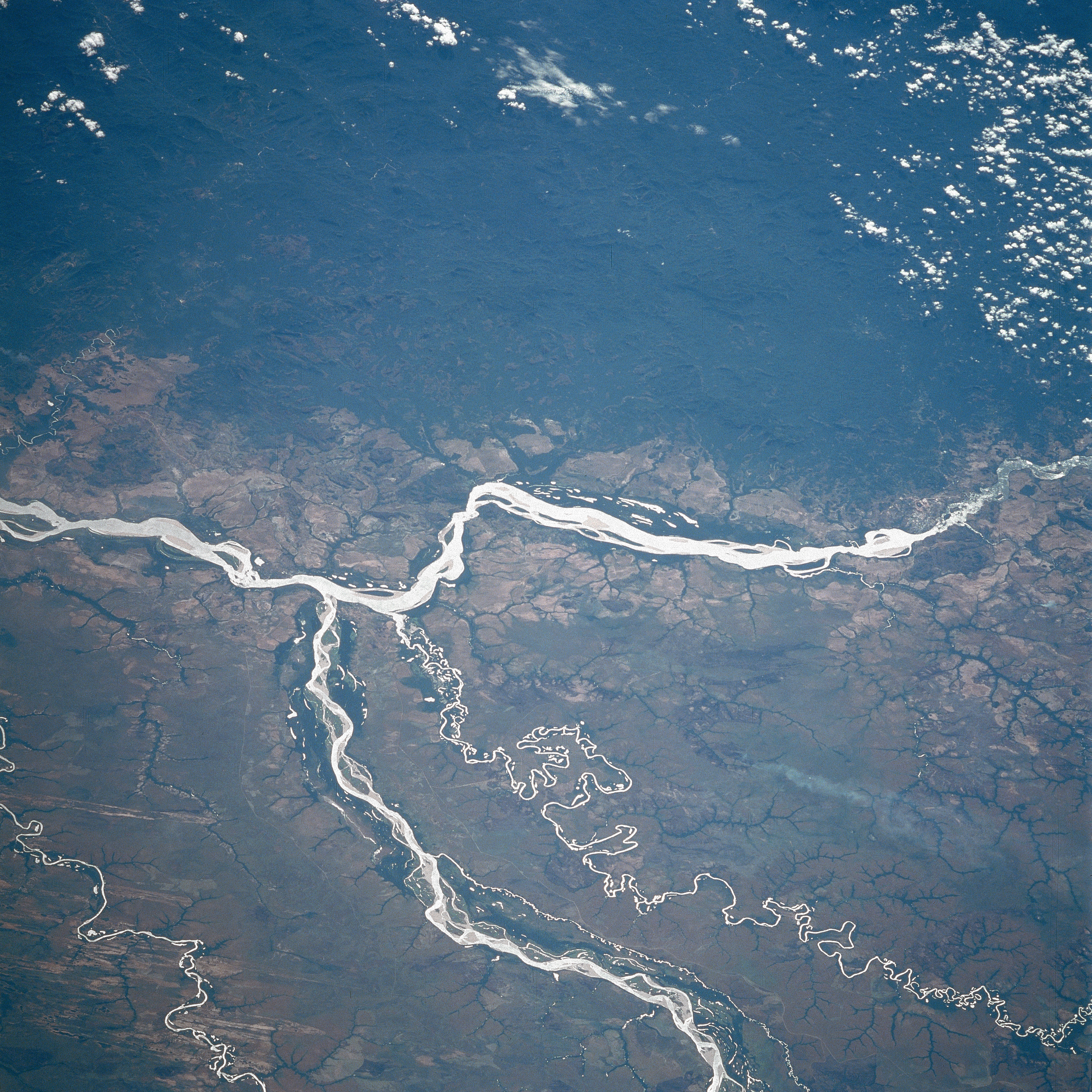
Parguaza range, green at top of image

Coltan mining in Venezuela, particularly within the Orinoco Mining Arc, highlights the tension between economic development, environmental degradation, and human rights concerns. Officially designated as a mining development area in 2016, the Arc spans over 111,000 square kilometers, encroaching on protected areas such as Canaima National Park and Indigenous territories. Critics argue that this policy has exacerbated illegal mining activities, deforestation, and human rights abuses.

The Venezuelan government promotes the Arc as a solution to economic woes, emphasizing the potential for mineral exports to boost revenues. However, this approach has been criticized as a form of neoextractivism, where resource dependency undermines long-term development and sustainability.

=== Environmental impacts ===
The environmental consequences of coltan mining in Venezuela are severe. Mining operations have resulted in deforestation, loss of biodiversity, and widespread contamination of water sources, including the Orinoco and Caroní rivers, through mercury and other pollutants.

Protected areas, such as Canaima National Park, face unprecedented threats due to mining encroachment. Deforestation and habitat destruction have displaced wildlife and endangered fragile ecosystems. These impacts align with broader concerns about the environmental toll of resource extraction, as discussed in global studies of coltan mining.

=== Human rights and social impacts ===
Coltan mining in the Orinoco Arc has drawn international criticism for widespread human rights violations. Forced labor and child exploitation are rampant, with many children working in hazardous conditions under the control of armed groups.

Indigenous communities have been disproportionately affected. Mining activities have displaced Indigenous peoples, disrupted cultural traditions, and violated their land rights. Mercury contamination from mining further exacerbates health risks in these communities.

=== Governance and corruption ===
Governance challenges in Venezuela have allowed illegal mining to flourish. Armed groups and criminal organizations control significant portions of mining operations, often with the complicity of government and military officials. This dynamic has perpetuated corruption and weakened state oversight.

The Venezuelan government's economic reliance on coltan and other minerals has also been linked to the "resource curse," where resource wealth fuels political instability and poor governance.

=== Global trade and international regulation ===
Venezuela’s coltan mining industry reflects broader global issues with the trade of conflict minerals. Coltan, a key component in electronic devices, is in high demand globally, leading to exploitative mining practices in regions like Venezuela and the Democratic Republic of the Congo.

International frameworks, such as the Dodd-Frank Act, attempt to address these issues by regulating conflict mineral sourcing. However, these frameworks have limitations, particularly in regions where enforcement is weak or non-existent.

=== Economic and social policies ===
The Orinoco Mining Arc represents a central pillar of Venezuela’s neo extractivism strategy, emphasizing resource extraction to address economic crises. While mining revenues provide short-term financial relief, critics argue that this approach entrenches economic dependency and social inequality.

Efforts to regulate mining within the Arc have been criticized as inadequate, allowing illegal operations to persist and contributing to environmental degradation and social harm.

== Proposed solutions ==
=== Ensuring clean coltan ===
It is difficult for manufacturers to ensure that the coltan they use in their products is not from a conflict zone or otherwise unethically produced. Currently there is one process for verifying the origin of a coltan sample. This process, developed in Germany, involves creating an elemental ‘fingerprint’ via WD X-ray fluorescence analysis and X-ray diffraction analysis to determine the composition and amounts of trace elements present in the sample. These results are then compared to the results of samples of known provenance, much like the Kimberly process for diamonds. This technique works for samples of mixed sources as well as pure coltan; however, it requires having sample fingerprints for all original coltan sources on file. Using this technique, it is possible to identify the source of most coltan samples. As of 2010, almost 75% of the world's coltan mines have samples on file. However, the process is expensive and lengthy and while it has worked in Rwanda, adapting these fingerprinting techniques to the DRC mining industry and convincing countries such as China to adopt these methods has been difficult. Both the United States and Canada have passed legislation that provides incentives for using certified coltan and making conflict materials extralegal, but because most coltan is processed in China and China does not use the certification processes, avoiding conflict coltan has been very difficult. Roughly 60% of the coltan mines in Africa, including in the DRC, have some percentage of Canadian backing but are not subject to Canada's laws about environmental hazards and human rights violations. Both Canada and the United States have passed acts that attempt to curtail the purchase of conflict-sourced materials.

Most of this change has been consumer-driven. Back in 2004, the TIC (Tantalum-Niobium International Study Center) had little interest in regulating conflict materials, but since then has become one of the leading voices promoting conflict-free minerals. Awareness campaigns in Western countries have pushed manufacturers such as Apple and Intel to rely on more than just the word of their suppliers that the coltan used in their products is conflict-free. This consumer interest pushed the TIC to create a working group in 2009 to promote better standards for coltan mining and over the next decade it successfully removed conflict minerals from the coltan supply chain. The group works with the OECD, European Commission, civil society, the International Tin Association, UN and with other NGOs to monitor risks associated with conflict affected and high risk (CAHRA) areas and to promote transparency in the supply chain. The TIC has created a process to deliver conflict-free coltan from Africa to refinery sites, called ITSCI, by using independent third-party companies to assess the mining sites and determine whether or not they violate of human rights and through working with RMI to audit them smelters and refiners that purchase material.

== See also ==
- Conflict minerals
- FairPhone
- Mining industry of the Democratic Republic of the Congo
- Supply chain
- Due diligence
- Gécamines
