= Dolly Cifuentes =

Colombian drug trafficker

Dolly de Jesús Cifuentes Villa, born 14 June 1964, is a drug trafficker from Medellín, Colombia, associated with the Sinaloa Cartel of Mexico. She was arrested and extradited to the United States in August 2012. Villa was sentenced to five years in prison in January 2014 for conspiracy to import and manufacture cocaine and subsequently released in 2015 after serving two years in prison in Colombia and three in the United States.

== Personal life ==
Very little is known about Villa's early life. She is part of a drug trafficking family known as the Cifuentes Villa clan or the Cifuentes-Villa Drug Trafficking Organization. Originally, the clan was led by three of Villa's brothers. Francisco Cifuentes Villa was a pilot for Pablo Escobar with assets estimated at over US$200 million before his death. Fernando Cifuentes Villa was associated with the Cali Cartel before his death. The third, Jorge Milton Cifuentes Villa, was arrested in Venezuela in 2012. It is unknown if Villa has a husband.

=== Relationship with Jaime Uribe ===
Dolly Cifuentes Villa gained notoriety upon her arrest in 2011 after Colombian media discovered her romantic affair with Jaime Alberto Uribe Velez, the brother of a former President of Colombia, Alvaro Uribe. The affair between Uribe and Villa occurred before the time of Alvaro Uribe's presidency; however, he was already a prominent public figure at the time. Jaime Uribe died in 2001. He allegedly had ties to Pablo Escobar, a business partner of Villa's brother Francisco. He had a wife, Astrid Velez, and two children. He and Dolly Cifuentes Villa also shared two children, Ana Maria Uribe Cifuentes and Daniel Alberto Uribe Cifuentes.

Alvaro Uribe, publicly recognized as a major supporter of the United States war on drugs, claimed to have no knowledge of the affair in a Twitter post on the subject.

== Drug trafficking ==
The Cifuentes Villa clan has allegedly moved over 30 tons of cocaine for the Sinaloa Cartel since 2007 despite the original leaders of the clan being arrested or killed. Dolly Cifuentes Villa was arrested in Colombia in 2011 and extradited to the United States in 2012, where she was charged with five crimes. Four of the five were withdrawn by the prosecution. Villa was charged with the fifth, conspiracy to import and manufacture cocaine. The charges carried a maximum sentence of life imprisonment, but due to a sealed agreement between Colombia and the United States, she could not face a life sentence or the death penalty. Villa's lawyer asked the judge to maintain the secrecy of the investigation for the safety of Villa's family. She was released in 2015 and returned to Colombia.
