= Valve metals =

In electrochemistry, a valve metal is a metal which passes current in only one direction. Usually, in an electrolytic cell, it can function generally as a cathode, but not generally as an anode because a (highly resistive) oxide of the metal forms under anodic conditions. Valve metals include commonly aluminium, titanium, tantalum, and niobium. Other metals may also be considered as valve metals, such as tungsten, chromium, zirconium, hafnium, zinc, vanadium, bismuth or antimony.
