= Marropino mine =

Tantalum mine in Zambezia, Mozambique

- Location: Zambezia Province, Mozambique
- Products: Tantalum
- Closed: 2013
- Company: Highland African Mining Company, owned by Noventa Group (based in Jersey)

The Marropino mine is a large mine located in the northern part of Mozambique in Zambezia Province. Marropino represents one of the largest tantalum reserves in Mozambique having estimated reserves of 21.7 million tonnes of ore grading 0.019% tantalum.

== Background ==
In 2008, the Marropino mine was considered the world's second-largest tantalum mining operation. Its operations were estimated to last at least 6 years.

In May 2009, the mine operations were put on "care and maintenance" to weather the 2008 crisis. The mine operator also reported processing difficulties, low recovery rates, high power and transportation costs.

In 2010, Noventa (previously Highland African Mining Company - HAMC), the concession-owner of the mine, was considering using the small port of Quelimane as the mine's new hub for maritime exports. When it reopened in April 2010, the mine stopped the production of Morganite. Patrick Lawless was named CEO of Noventa in June 2010. The same month, the company announced the launch of Project Ligonha, a 3-month preliminary geological evaluation of the concessions' grounds. The project was managed conjointly with the University of Glasgow and the Eduardo Mondlane University.

In August 2010, Noventa's first shipment (since reopening) of 8 tonnes of tantalum to an Asian client left the country from Quelimane.

Early 2012, Cyclone Funso caused some damage to the mine's buildings, along with minor floodings. The cyclone also brought a plague of non-endemic, poisonous rove beetles that affected 30% of the mine's workforce.

In August 2013, it was reported by the Mozambican newspaper Notícias that the Marropino mine had halted its operations. Noventa explained that the remaining veins of tantalum were too deep and with higher levels of metals, making the operations unprofitable. Despite its plan to use Quelimane as an export port, the company had to stick with the twice-farther port of Walvis Bay, the only one in the country certified to handle class 7 products.

== Research ==
The research team at the Marropino mine had teamed up with a multidisciplinary team of the University of Glasgow to optimize the recovery of tantalum from its ore, as 50% of the rare metal was usually not extracted and disposed of as mineral waste.

The research concluded:

- Reduce ore to slightly finer fraction size to extract higher levels of tantalum-bering grains;
- Remove mica crystals as early as possible;
- Make simple technology adjustments;
- Also apply process to waste dumps.

== Production ==
Year	Product	Volume (in tons)
2008	Columbite-tantalite	65.196

== See also ==
- Mineral industry of Mozambique
- Wodgina mine
