= Artumas Group =

Petroleum company

Artumas Group Inc.
- Company type: Public (OSE: AGI)
- Industry: Petroleum
- Headquarters: Canada
- Area served: Tanzania; Mozambique
- Website: www.artumas.com

Artumas Group is a petroleum company that operates in the Rovuma Delta Basin in Tanzania and Mozambique. The company is currently involved in regional natural gas export and local gas commercialization initiatives within Tanzania, and hydrocarbon exploration operations in Mozambique. Artumas is based in Canada and listed on the Oslo Stock Exchange.

In September 2010, Artumas Group unanimously voted to change the name of the company to "Wentworth Resources Limited". It currently trades on the Oslo Stock Exchange as "WRL".
