= Oil war =

Term used for any conflict about petroleum resources

An oil war is a conflict about petroleum resources, or their transportation, consumption, or regulation. The term may also refer generally to any conflict in a region that contains oil reserves or is geographically positioned in a location where an entity has or may wish to develop production or transportation infrastructure for petroleum products. It is also used to refer to any of a number of specific oil wars.

There are multiple hypothesized pathways for oil to contribute to war, including:

- Territory with oil raises the payoffs to territorial conquest (e.g. Chaco War)
- Territorial conquest creates a risk of market domination (e.g. Iraqi conquest of Kuwait led to the Gulf War)
- Foreign workers in petrostates may motivate grievances (e.g. Al-Qaeda terrorism)
- Oil wealth makes leaders less accountable to the public, lowering the risks of starting wars
- Oil wealth can help finance nonstate actors to undertake rebellions and conduct civil wars
- States' efforts to secure transit routes for oil can create conflict

Scholars have debated the extent to which oil contributes to war. Professor Emily Meierding has characterized oil wars as largely a myth. She argues that proponents of oil wars underestimate the ability to seize and exploit foreign oil fields, and thus exaggerate the value of oil wars. She has examined four cases commonly described as oil wars (Japan's attack on the Dutch East Indies in World War II, Iraq's invasion of Kuwait, the Iran-Iraq War, and the Chaco War between Bolivia and Paraguay), finding that control of additional oil resources was not the main cause of aggression in the conflicts.

A 2024 study found that the presence of oil in contested territory can make states less likely to seek to acquire the territory, while a 2026 study found that when a newly discovered fuel resource is claimable to multiple states, the likelihood of war increases.

== List of wars described as oil wars ==
- During World War I (1914–1918), certain operations were planned specifically to secure oil resources.
- Chaco War (1932–1935)
- World War II (1939–1945):
  - Oil campaign of World War II
  - Oil campaign chronology of World War II
  - Oil campaign targets of World War II
- Events leading to the attack on Pearl Harbor (1941–1945)
- Biafran War, also known as the Nigerian Civil War (1967–1970)
- Wars related to Saddam Hussein
  - Iran–Iraq War (1980–1988)
  - Gulf War (1990–1991)
    - Gulf War oil spill
    - Kuwaiti oil fires
  - Iraqi no-fly zones conflicts (1992–2003)
  - Iraq War (2003–2011)
    - Rationale for the Iraq War § Oil
- Conflict in the Niger Delta (ongoing)
- Heglig Crisis, South Sudan–Sudan border conflict (2012)
- 2026 United States intervention in Venezuela
- 2026 Iran war

== See also ==
- Petro-aggression
- Petrodollar recycling
- Petroleum politics
- Resource curse
- Resource war
- Booty futures contract
- 1973 oil crisis
- 1990 oil price shock
- Iran–Saudi Arabia proxy war
- Territorial disputes in the South China Sea
- 1953 Iranian coup d'état
- Foreign involvement in the Venezuelan presidential crisis
