= Ecodesk =

Cloud based ESG data platform

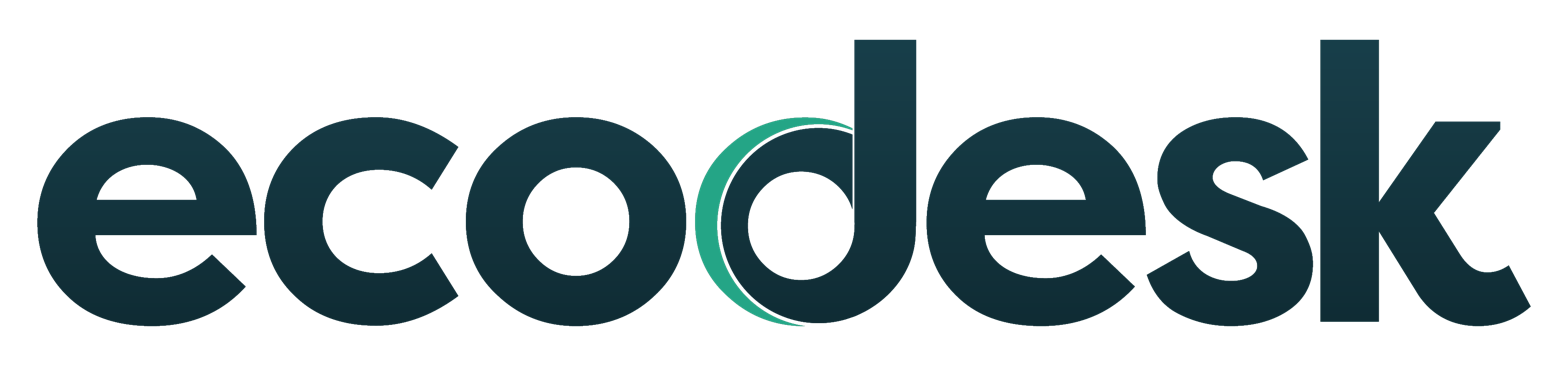
- Industry: ESG Data Services
- Founded: 2010
- Headquarters: Bristol, United Kingdom
- Key people: Robert Clarke (Founder) Damien Smith (CEO) Mark Adorian (Chairman)

Ecodesk is a cloud based data platform used by corporate businesses to track, monitor, and report their ESG data.

Data relating to environmental, social, and governance subject areas is input to the platform for use in reporting to stakeholders via standards such as CDP, GRI, GHG Protocol, or for use by businesses to engage stakeholders in their sustainability achievements.

Ecodesk was founded by the successful entrepreneur Robert Clarke in Australia in 2007 and migrated to the UK in 2010. In 2018, Ecodesk received the highly acclaimed ISAR Honours Award from UNCTAD in recognition of its work building a digital platform for mapping the non-financial reporting landscape with WBCSD's Redefining Values programme, CDSB and with support from the Gordon and Betty Moore Foundation.

== Services ==
Ecodesk enables organisations to improve the management and performance of their supply chain and to reduce their inherent risk through the collection and aggregation of ESG data presented. Ecodesk is not a ratings or rankings provider but does provide flexible supplier scorecard solutions via what is termed an SAQ (self-assessment questionnaire). Like most software providers in the market, it displays data to enterprise users in the form of dashboards and digital reporting functions.

The SaaSS platform is supported by a managed service that helps suppliers with their non-financial reporting obligations. The platform is free to use for entities responding to a data request and levies a charge for enterprise users to connect with their extended supply chains.

== See also ==
- Carbon Disclosure Project
- Supply chain management
- Conflict minerals
- Open data
