= Resource war =

War fought over resources

A resource war is a type of war caused by conflict over resources. In a resource war, there is typically a nation or group that controls the resource and an aggressor that wishes to seize control over said resource. This power dynamic between nations has been a significant underlying factor in conflicts since the late 19th century. Following the rise of industrialization, the amount of raw materials an industrialized nation uses to sustain its activities is heightened.

== History ==
=== Chincha Islands War ===
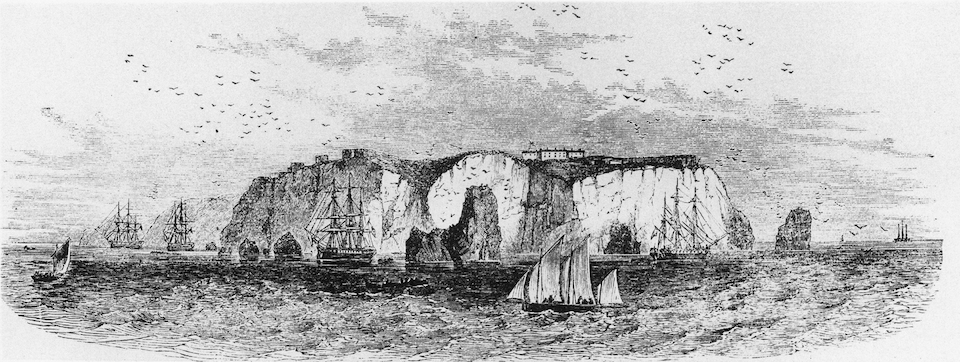
Illustration of the Chincha Islands of Peru, c. 1859

One of the most prolific examples of resource war in history is the conflict over Chincha Island guano in the late 19th century. The Chincha Islands of Peru are situated off of the southern coast of Peru, where many seabirds were known to roost and prey on fish brought there by the currents of the Pacific Ocean. The guano of these seabirds is incredibly dense in nutrients and became a sought-after resource as a fertilizer. Soil that was nutrient rich allowed for higher crop yields, which subsequently translated to better sustenance of the population and overall improved economic performance. Known colloquially as "white gold", guano from the Chincha Islands began to catch the interest of Spain, the United Kingdom, the United States, and other industrial powers at the time.

The international interest for that resource resulting in a number of conflicts including the Chincha Islands War between Spain and Peru and the War of the Pacific between Chile, Bolivia, and Peru. Although the primary inciting force of the conflict originated over possession of the nutrient-rich guano, Spain also attempted to exercise prior colonial control over Peru during its aggressions during this conflict. The Chincha Islands guano became a resource of imperialism with foreign nations inciting conflict and establishing dominion over it. In 1856, United States President Franklin Pierce passed the Guano Islands Act with the exclusive purpose of addressing American scarcity over guano. Under the Guano Islands Act, any piece of uninhabited land that harbors a guano deposit could be claimed as a territory of the United States to extract the resource. The legislation acted as a workaround for the United States to access Peruvian seabird guano since direct trade was not an option because of a treaty between Peru and the United Kingdom.

== Perspectives ==
=== Geopolitical ===
Under the geopolitical lens for interpreting resource wars, the main rationale behind resource conflict is strategic. It assumes that control over the resource provides a particular advantage to that nation and interprets hostile attempts to take over the resource as a means to acquire that advantage for themselves. Resources that are deemed strategic shift over time and pertain to what is required for economic expansion or success at the time. Examples of this include timber during the seventeenth century for naval development or oil during the twentieth century onward for enabling military technology and transportation.

=== Environmental security ===
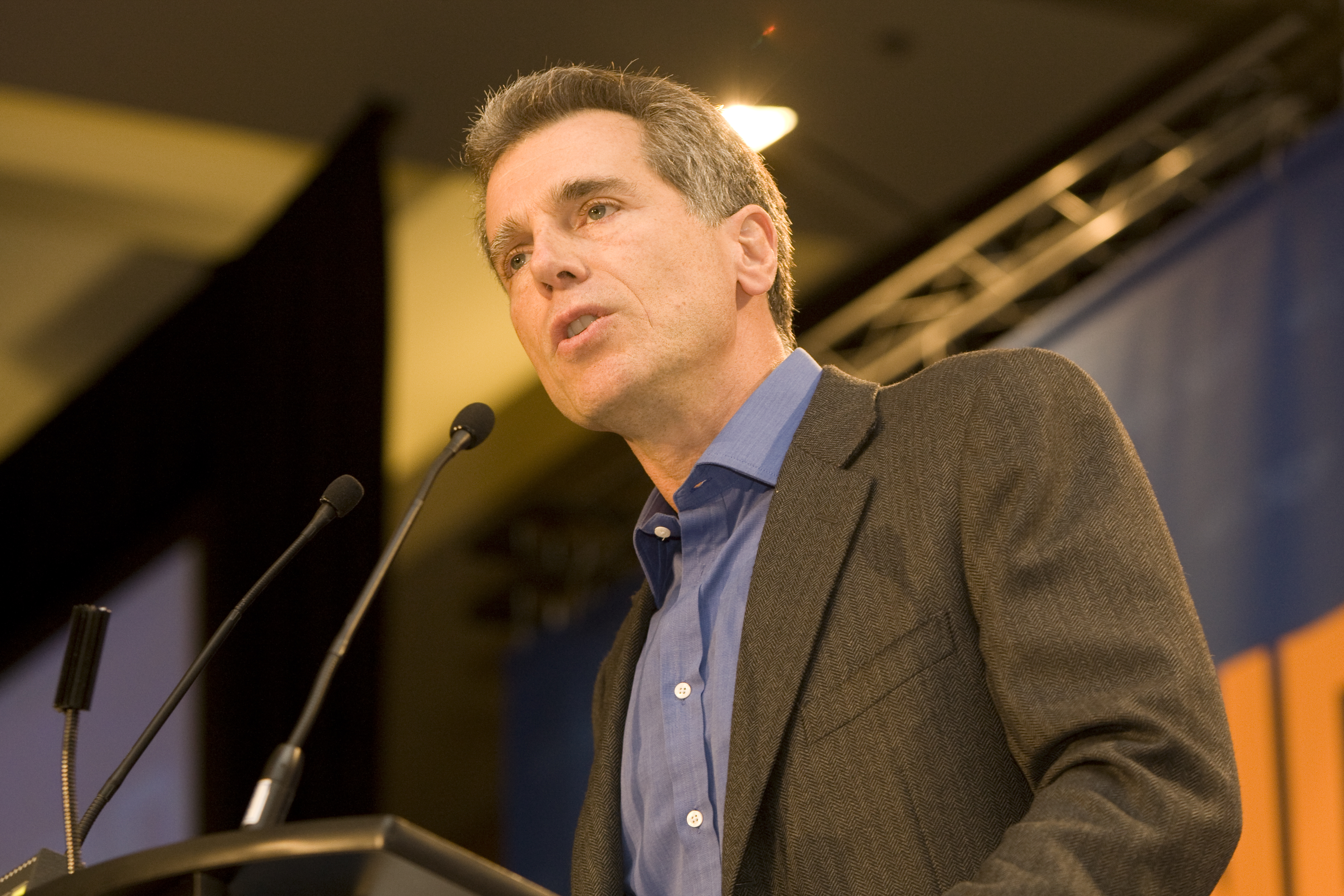
Dr. Thomas Homer-Dixon at an NDP convention in British Columbia, c. 2007

Also known as the environmental scarcity or political economy, the environmental security perspective interprets resource conflict as a response to resource scarcity. A notable proponent of the environmental security perspective is Dr. Thomas Homer-Dixon, a Canadian political scientist and professor at the University of Waterloo. The work of Homer-Dixon focuses on two different phenomena regarding the effect of resources on violent conflict: resource scarcity and resource abundance. Under the environmental security perspective, resource scarcity perpetuates conflict by inciting pressures on a society that is dealing with resource deprivation. According to Homer-Dixon, populations struggling with resource scarcity are also impacted by overpopulation and inequitable resource allocation. Overpopulation and inequitable resource allocation can make resource scarcity even more pronounced, creating a cyclical instability in the society.

Conversely, countries with natural resource abundance are impacted in a different way. Countries that are wealthy in resources have been shown to have disproportionate economic growth, less democracy, and overall insufficient development outcomes. This permeates from an overdependence on their resource from an economic standpoint, where authoritarian traits may begin to take effect. This creates pressure on the citizens as a whole due to undermined governance of the nation and volatile economic state if the resource fluctuates heavily in price. This phenomenon is known as the resource curse.

== Conflict resources ==
Conflict resources are natural resources extracted in a conflict zone and sold to perpetuate the fighting. There is both statistical and anecdotal evidence that the presence of precious commodities can prolong conflicts (a "resource curse"). An unfortunate irony is that many countries rich in minerals are impoverished in terms of their capacity for governance. Conflict, corruption and bribery may be seen as the typical costs of doing business. The extraction and sale of blood diamonds, also known as "conflict diamonds", is a better-known phenomenon which occurs under virtually identical conditions. Petroleum can also be a conflict resource. Other commodities are also involved in financing conflict.

=== History ===
The concept of "conflict resource", or "conflict commodity" emerged in the late 1990s, initially in relation to the "blood diamonds" that were financing rebellions in Angola and Sierra Leone. Then "conflict timber" financed hostilities in Cambodia and Liberia.

=== Conventions ===
The concept was first officially discussed by the UN General Assembly in the context of 'conflict diamonds': The UN Security Council has since referred to conflict resources in several resolutions, particularly resolutions 1533 and I698.97.

Since 1996 the Bonn International Center for Conversion has tracked resource governance and conflict intensity by country. Aside from fossil fuels, metals, diamonds, and timber it tracks the governance of other primary goods that might fund conflicts, including: poppy seeds and talc (Afghanistan), rubber (Ivory Coast), cotton (Zambia), and cocoa (Indonesia).

=== Legal frameworks ===
Several countries and organizations, including the United States, European Union, and OECD have designated tantalum, tin, tungsten, and gold connected to conflict in the DRC as conflict minerals and legally require companies to report trade or use of conflict minerals as a way to reduce incentives for armed groups to extract and fight over the minerals.

=== Supporting external conflicts ===
In the 2020s, the concept of conflict minerals was extended to those mined to support conflicts in parts of the world other than where the mining takes place. The Wagner Group has been granted mining rights in the Central African Republic in return for securing the continuity of the government. This "blood gold" is then sold to support Russia in the Russo-Ukrainian War. Wagner also has gold-related operations in Mali and Sudan.

== See also ==
- Oil war
- Petro-aggression
- Booty futures contract
- Resource curse
- Territorial disputes in the South China Sea
- Water conflict
