= Freight equalisation policy =

Indian economic policy

Freight equalisation policy was adopted by the Government of India (Union Government) to facilitate the equal growth of industry all over India (Indian Union). This meant a factory could be set up anywhere in India and the transportation of minerals would be subsidised by the Union Government. The policy was introduced in 1952, and remained in force until 1993. The policy hurt the economic prospects of the mineral-rich Indian states like Jharkhand (then part of Bihar), West Bengal, Madhya Pradesh, Assam, Chhattisgarh, and Odisha, since it weakened the incentives for private capital to establish production facilities in these states. As a result of the policy, businesses preferred setting up industrial locations closer to the coastal trade Indian states like Maharashtra and Gujarat and markets in the cities such as Mumbai and Delhi.

== Rationale ==
The freight equalisation concept made "essential" items available at relatively constant prices throughout the country. These items included coal, steel, and cement, among many others. The idea was to promote balanced regional development of industries throughout the country, but it developed few coastal states like Maharashtra and Gujarat.

== Results ==
Industrialists interested in setting up plants anywhere in the country would get coal, iron ore, aluminium, etc. at the same price as they used to get in the mineral-rich states. A factory could be set up anywhere in the country and the transportation of minerals would be subsidised by the central government. As a result, there was growth of heavy and middle level-industry outside the mineral-rich regions of the country.

The policy transferred competitive advantages of eastern states to western, southern, and northern states. According to British academic Stuart Corbridge, the policy discouraged the establishment of "resource-processing industries in eastern India, as opposed to the extractive industries, which seem to have imposed on the region a version of the 'resource curse' noted more frequently in sub-Saharan Africa."

In the western region, the policy especially benefited the coastal states such as Maharashtra and Gujarat. The finance minister T. T. Krishnamachari also equalised the freight, which greatly benefited the cement manufacturers in the South Indian states, as limestone and dolomite became cheaper to transport from North India. The North Indian areas that benefited from the policy included Delhi, its surrounding districts, and Punjab.

The sufferers of this policy were the states of West Bengal, Jharkhand (then part of Bihar), Madhya Pradesh, Chhattisgarh and Odisha. These states lost their competitive advantage of holding the minerals, as the factories could now be set up anywhere in India. This was not the case in the pre-independence era, when the major business houses like the Tatas and the Dalmias set up industries in Jharkhand (then part of Bihar), and most of the engineering industry was located in the state of West Bengal. Even after the removal of the policy in the early 1990s, these states could not catch up with the more industrialised states. In 1996, the Commerce & Industry minister of West Bengal complained that "the removal of the freight equalisation and licensing policies cannot compensate for the ill that has already been done".
