= Conflict minerals law =

Law regarding Conflict Minerals

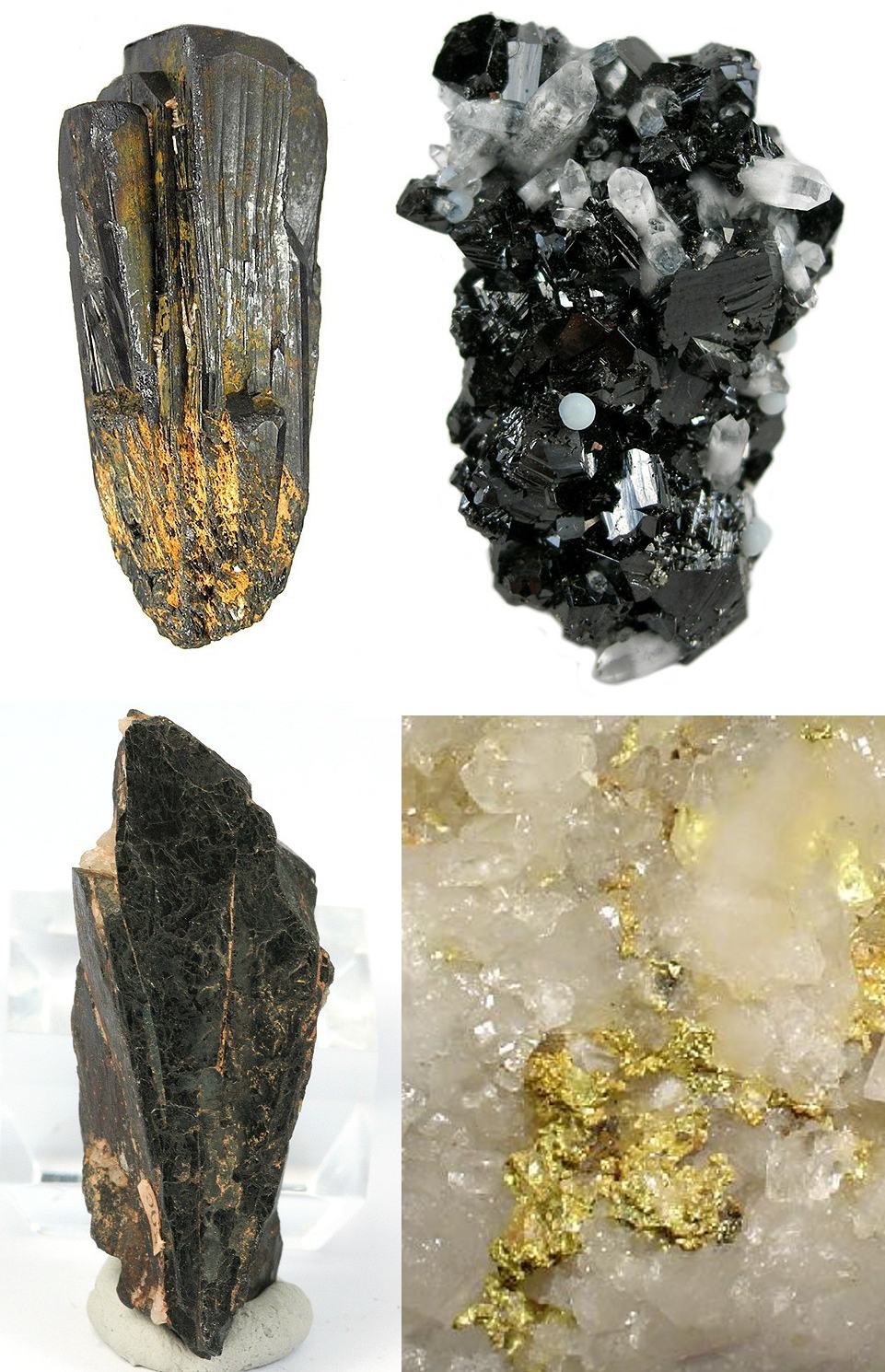
The main topic of conflict minerals regulations, clockwise from top left: coltan (tantalum ore), cassiterite (tin ore), gold ore, and wolframite (tungsten ore).

Conflict mineral laws include laws passed in the European Union and United States since 2010, which require companies to report the use of four specific conflict minerals.

The eastern Democratic Republic of the Congo (DRC) has a history of conflict, where various armies, rebel groups, and outside actors have profited from mining while contributing to violence and exploitation during wars in the region. The four main end products of mining in the eastern DRC are tin, tungsten, tantalum, and gold, which are extracted and passed through a variety of intermediaries before being sold to international markets. These four products, (known as the 3TGs) are essential in the manufacture of a variety of devices, including consumer electronics such as smartphones, tablets, and computers.

Some have identified the conflict as significantly motivated by control over resources. In response, several countries and organizations, including the United States, European Union, and OECD have designated 3TG minerals connected to conflict in the DRC as conflict minerals and legally require companies to report trade or use of conflict minerals as a way to reduce incentives for armed groups to extract and fight over the minerals.

In the United States, the 2010 Dodd–Frank Wall Street Reform and Consumer Protection Act required manufacturers to audit their supply chains and report use of conflict minerals. In 2015, a US federal appeals court struck down some aspects of the reporting requirements as a violation of corporations' freedom of speech, but left others in place.

== Organizations and activists involved ==
The Organisation for Economic Co-operation and Development (OECD) published its guidance on conflict minerals supply chain traceability in 2011. Parties involved in the development of the OECD guidance included 11 countries from the International Conference on the Great Lakes Region (Angola, Burundi, Central African Republic, Republic of Congo, Democratic Republic of Congo, Kenya, Rwanda, Sudan, Tanzania, Uganda and Zambia), industry representatives, civil society organisations, and a United Nations group of DRC experts. United Nations Security Council Resolution 1952 in 2010 called for all member states to legislate on supply chain due diligence and supply chain risks.

The FairPhone Foundation raises awareness of conflict minerals in the mobile industry and is a company which tries to produce a smart phone with 'fair' conditions along the supply chain. Various industry and trade associations are also monitoring developments in conflict minerals laws and traceability frameworks. Some of these represent electronics, retailers, jewelry, mining, electronics components, and general manufacturing sectors. One organization – ITRI (a UK-based international non-profit organization representing the tin industry and sponsored/supported by its members, principally miners and smelters.) had spearheaded efforts for the development and implementation of a "bag and tag" scheme at the mine as a key element of credible traceability. The program and related efforts were initially not likely to extend beyond the pilot phase due to a variety of implementation and funding problems that occurred. In the end, however, the device did enter the market.

In late March 2011, the UK government launched an information section on its then Foreign & Commonwealth Office website dedicated to conflict minerals. This information resource is intended to assist British companies in understanding the issues and, specifically, the US requirements.

== Democratic Republic of the Congo ==
The history of extraction in the Congo began in 1885 following the Berlin West Africa Conference, as King Leopold II of Belgium forcibly dispossessed Congolese kings of their land through invalid treaties and established rubber plantations through the use of military violence. The country was characterized by extraordinarily violent treatment of natives, including mass killings, sex crimes, and torture for not meeting quotas because exploitation of resources was the first priority to secure profits for the Belgian colonial empire. In 1908 control was transferred from Leopold II to the Belgian colonial administration, although exploitation of resources remained key to economic growth. Racism, political subjugation, and forced labor remained prevalent and helped enforce a power dynamic to ensure continued economic production.

Independence movements, including the Alliance des Bakongo (ABAKO) and the Mouvement National Congolais (MNC), gained traction in the late 1950s, both supported partly by a strong nationalist wave. Clashes between the Belgian security forces, the Force Publique, and nationalist protestors in Léopoldville on January 4, 1959, triggered events leading to the Congo being granted independence in June 1960. The execution of MNC leader Patrice Lumumba in January 1961 by CIA-backed coup leader Joseph Mobutu showed the violence experienced by those attempting to unify the new political landscape.

Continued conflicting intervention from the UN, USA, Soviets, Chinese, Belgians, and others left the Congo politically unstable without a representational government and lacking basic social services. The legacy of this instability simultaneously leaves new governments vulnerable to conflict by militia groups and unable to exercise sufficient oversight of their territory, enabling contemporary mineral conflicts. Armed conflict and mineral resource looting by the Congolese National Army and various armed rebel groups, including the Democratic Forces for the Liberation of Rwanda (FDLR) and the National Congress for the Defense of the People (CNDP), a proxy Rwandan militia group, has occurred throughout the late 20th century and the early 21st century. As of 2020, an estimated 113 armed groups were operating in the Kivu region, ranging from small militias to sophisticated groups with international support. Such armed groups have continued to commit severe human rights abuses, and battles, fatalities, and attacks on civilians have increased steadily from 2017 to 2021.

Extraction of the Congo's natural resources also occurs across its immediate borders. During the First Congo War (1996–1997) and Second Congo War (1998–2003), Rwanda, Uganda and Burundi particularly profited from the Congo's resources. These governments continue to smuggle resources out of the Congo to this day. Minerals mined in Eastern Congo pass through the hands of numerous middlemen as they are shipped out of Congo through neighboring countries such as Rwanda or Burundi, to East Asian processing plants. Because of this, the US Conflict Minerals Law applies to materials originating (or claimed to originate) from the DRC as well as the nine adjoining countries: Angola, Burundi, Central African Republic, Republic of Congo, Rwanda, South Sudan, Zimbabwe, Uganda, and Zambia. The profits from the sale of these minerals have financed fighting in derivative ongoing conflicts. Control of lucrative mines has also become a military objective.

As of 2024, the Congo contains an estimated $24 trillion in raw mineral deposits, making it the world's richest country measured by wealth of natural resources. The international market for critical minerals driven by the clean energy transition grew from $160bn to $320bn from 2017-2022, similarly increasing demand in the Congo for minerals including cobalt, copper, and lithium. Gold and diamonds continue to finance regional conflict due to their high value to weight ratio, and no jewellery industry standard exists for verifying gold origination as it does for diamonds (though jewellers' total outlay on gold is five times that on diamonds). Other conflict minerals being illicitly exported from the Congo include tungsten, tin, cassiterite, and coltan (which provides the tantalum for mobile phones, and is also said to be directly sustaining the conflict). Scholar Siddharth Kara explains that similar to the slavery-for-rubber economy that contributed to the human rights abuses of the early Congo, a blood-for-cobalt economy continues to dehumanize Congolese people and is responsible for continuing conflict.

A major research report from November 2012 by the Southern Africa Resource Watch revealed that gold miners in the east of the Democratic Republic of Congo were being exploited by corrupt government officials, bureaucrats and security personnel, who all demand illegal tax, fees and levies from the miners without delivering any services in return. Despite the alleged gold rush in various regions of the country, none of the population or workforce is benefiting from this highly lucrative industry.

While corruption due to weak governance is an issue, companies contributing to the economic pressure and facilitating government corruption are underlying factors. These companies include well-known brands such as Apple, Google, and Samsung, which profit from the relatively lower prices associated with corruption and illicit trade. Filings of Reasonable Country-of-Origin Inquiries (RCOI) to determine sources of conflict minerals decreased from 2014 to 2021, which is a concern, significantly as demand has increased. These filings also reveal a trend where companies increasingly determine the source country (compared to being unable to determine), but the percentage from covered countries has increased. These companies have continued to grow in part due to unethical extraction in covered countries, and enforcing corporate accountability is difficult due to international legal processes and weak governance as mentioned above.

=== Mines ===
Mines in eastern Congo are often far away from populated areas in remote and dangerous regions. A recent International Peace Information Service (IPIS) study indicates that armed groups are present at more than 50% of mining sites. At many sites, armed groups illegally tax, extort, and coerce civilians to work. Miners, including children, work up to 48-hour shifts amidst mudslides and tunnel collapses that kill many. The groups are sometimes but not always affiliated with rebel groups or with the Congolese National Army, but both use rape and violence to control the local population. While these groups are the direct perpetrators of the violence, international power struggles mainly between the US and China ensure that demand remains high for conflict minerals, regardless of known human rights abuses taking place. Demand for conflict minerals used in military technology has also become a national defense issue especially during rising US-China tensions. The electronics and clean energy industries are the biggest cobalt consumers globally. Yet, 16 multinational consumer brands are listed in a 2016 Amnesty International report, and none traced their cobalt supply chain. This chain starts with undocumented traders selling cobalt, often mined using child labor, to the Chinese-owned Congo Dongfang Mining company, which then supplies battery manufacturers, including CATL, LG, and Glencore. These battery manufacturers supply international electronics brands such as Apple, Microsoft, and Tesla, which claim "conflict-free" products despite widespread and documented human rights abuse cases.

== United States law ==
=== Conflict minerals ===
The four conflict minerals codified in the U.S. Conflict Minerals Law, are:

- Columbite-tantalite (or coltan, the colloquial African term) is the metal ore from which the element tantalum is extracted. Tantalum is used primarily for the production of tantalum capacitors, particularly for applications requiring high performance, a small compact format and high reliability, from hearing aids and pacemakers, to airbags, GPS, ignition systems and anti-lock braking systems in automobiles, through to laptop computers, mobile phones, video game consoles, video cameras and digital cameras. In its carbide form, tantalum possesses significant hardness and wear resistance properties. As a result, it is used in jet engine/turbine blades, drill bits, end mills and other tools.
- Cassiterite is the chief ore needed to produce tin, essential for the production of tin cans and the solder on the circuit boards of electronic equipment. Tin is also commonly a component of biocides, fungicides and as tetrabutyl tin/tetraoctyl tin, an intermediate in polyvinyl chloride (PVC) and high performance paint manufacturing.
- Wolframite is an important source of the element tungsten. Tungsten is a very dense metal and is frequently used for this property, such as in fishing weights, dart tips and golf club heads. Like tantalum carbide, tungsten carbide possesses hardness and wear resistance properties and is frequently used in applications like metalworking tools, drill bits and milling. Smaller amounts are used to substitute lead in "green ammunition". Minimal amounts are used in electronic devices, including the vibration mechanism of cell phones.
- Gold is used in jewelry, investments, electronics, and dental products. It is also present in some chemical compounds used in certain semiconductor manufacturing processes.

These are sometimes termed "the 3T's and gold", "3TG", or even simply the "3T's", referring to the elements of interest they contain (tantalum, tin, tungsten, gold). Under the US Conflict Minerals Law, additional minerals may be added to this list in the future.

There has been a push in recent years to consider cobalt as an additional conflict mineral, as since 2019 the Congo accounts for 70% of global production. Cobalt demand has also increased 70% from 2017 to 2022 driven by lithium-ion battery demand, and “the Enough Project estimates that 60 percent of that production in the Congo comes from illegal mines.”

=== History ===
In April 2009, Senator Sam Brownback (R-KS) introduced the Congo Conflict Minerals Act of 2009 (S. 891) to require electronics companies to verify and disclose their sources of cassiterite, wolframite, and tantalum. This legislation died in committee. However, Brownback added similar language as Section 1502 of the Dodd–Frank Wall Street Reform and Consumer Protection Act, which passed Congress and was signed into law by President Barack Obama on July 21, 2010. This Conflict Mineral Law was published in the Federal Register of December 23, 2010.

The U.S. Securities and Exchange Commission (SEC) draft regulations to implement the law would have required U.S. and certain foreign companies to report and make public their use of so-called "conflict minerals" from the Democratic Republic of the Congo or adjoining countries in their products. Comments on this proposal were extended until March 2, 2011. The comments on the proposal were reviewable by the public.

One report on the proposal stated the following statistics for the submitted comments:

- Slightly more than 700 comment letters were submitted to SEC on the proposal;
- Approximately 65% of those were form letters or basic letters from the general public supporting the rule's intent;
- The remaining 35% (roughly 270) represent views of businesses, trade/industry associations, the investment/financial community, professional auditing firms, and other relevant governmental entities; and
- Of those 270 comments, an estimated 200 contained substantive and/or technical comments.

That report also contained what it calls a "preview of the final SEC regulations" synthesized from their detailed research and analysis of a large body of documents, reports and other information on the law, proposed regulation and the current budget/political setting facing the SEC in the current administration.

The final rule went into effect 13 November 2012.

The SEC rule did not go unnoticed by the international community, including entities seeking to undermine traceability efforts. A report published by a metals trading publication illustrated one DRC ore/mineral flow method that has apparently been devised to thwart detection.

On July 15, 2011, the US State Department issued a statement on the subject. Section 1502(c) of the Law mandates that the State Department work in conjunction with SEC on certain elements of conflict minerals policy development and support.

On October 23, 2012, U.S. State Dept Officials asserted that ultimately, it falls on the U.S. State Dept. to determine when this rule would no longer apply.

In April 2014, the United States Court of Appeals for the District of Columbia Circuit struck down Section 13(p) and Rule 13(p)-1 of the SEC Rules, deeming them in violation of the First Amendment. Following this ruling, the Court noted that there was no "First Amendment objection to any other aspect of the conflict minerals report or required disclosures".

=== Auditing and reporting requirements ===
US Conflict Minerals Law contains two requirements that are closely connected:

- independent third party supply chain traceability audits
- reporting of audit information to the public and SEC.

Even companies not directly regulated by the SEC will be impacted by the audit requirements because they will be pushed down through entire supply chains, including privately held and foreign-owned companies.

SEC estimated that 1,199 "issuers" (i.e., companies subject to filing other SEC reports) will be required to submit full conflict mineral reports. This estimate was developed by finding the amount of tantalum produced by the DRC in comparison to global production (15% – 20%). The Commission selected the higher figure of 20% and multiplied that by 6,000 (the total number of "issuers" SEC will be required to do initial product/process evaluations). This estimate does not account for the companies who supply materials to the "issuers" (but are not themselves SEC-regulated) but who will almost certainly be required to conduct conflict minerals audits to meet the demands of those customers. Other estimates indicate that the total number of US companies likely impacted may exceed 12,000.

A study of the potential impact of the regulation in early 2011 by the IPC – Association Connecting Electronic Industries trade association. was submitted with the association's comments to the SEC. The study states that the IPC survey respondents had a median of 163 direct suppliers. Applying that number to the SEC's estimated number of impacted issuers results in the possibility of over 195,000 businesses that could be subject to some level of supply chain traceability effort.

==== Applicability in general ====
Under the law, companies have to submit an annual conflict minerals report to the SEC if:

- (a) they are required to file reports with the SEC under the Exchange Act of 1934
- (b) conflict minerals are necessary to the functionality or production of a product that they manufacture or contract to be manufactured. That statement contains two separate – but critical concepts: the purpose of the conflict mineral in the product/process, and the control that the company exerts over the manufacturing process/specifications.

A company would be deemed to contract an item to be manufactured if it:

- Exerts any influence over the manufacturing process; or,
- Offers a generic product under its own brand name or a separate brand name (regardless of whether the company has any influence over the manufacturing process) and the company contracted to have the product manufactured specifically for itself.

This language implied that some retailers who are not manufacturers might be subject to the audit and disclosure requirements.

"Contracting to manufacture" a product requires some actual influence over the manufacturing of process that product, a determination based on facts and circumstances. A company is not to be deemed to have influence over the manufacturing process if it merely:

- Affixes its brand, marks, logo, or label to a generic product manufactured by a third party.
- Services, maintains, or repairs a product manufactured by a third party.
- Specifies or negotiates contractual terms with a manufacturer that do not directly relate to the manufacturing of the product.

The proposed regulations attempted to clarify that tools used in assembly and manufacturing will not trigger the law. The intent was to cover minerals/metals in the final product only. Nothing specifically addresses intermediate chemical processes that use chemicals that contain conflict minerals. Additionally, neither the law nor the proposed regulation established a de minimis quantity or other form of materiality threshold that would preclude the applicability of the auditing/reporting requirements.

==== Supply chain traceability auditing ====
The law mandates the use of an "independent private sector auditor" to conduct the audits. SEC has proposed two different standards for the audits: the "reasonable inquiry" and the "due diligence". Should the final rule include this structure, the reasonable inquiry would be the first step to determine if the company can on its own, using reasonable efforts and trustworthy information, make a reliable determination as to the source/origin of its tin, tantalum, tungsten and/or gold. Where companies are unable to make such a determination for any reason, they would then be required to take the next step of the "due diligence", which is the independent private sector audit.

The statute specified that the audits be "conducted in accordance with standards established by the Comptroller General of the United States, in accordance with rules promulgated by the Commission". This means that the same auditing standards that apply to other SEC auditing requirements will apply to conflict minerals audits Because of this language, SEC will have little discretion to allow companies to issue self-generated statements or certifications to satisfy the law.

Third party audits for conflict minerals supply chain traceability began in summer 2010 under the Electronic Industry Citizenship Coalition (EICC), a US-based electronics manufacturing trade association. Under this program, EICC selected three audit firms to conduct the actual audits, with two of the three participating in the pilot audits in 2010. After concluding the pilot, one of the two firms involved in 2010 withdrew from the program specifically in response to the SEC's proposal and to reduce potential legal risks to the audited entities.

Neither the law nor the proposed regulations provide guidance on what will be considered an acceptable audit scope or process, preferring to allow companies the flexibility meeting the requirement in a manner that is responsive to their own individual business and supply chain. At the same time, the law contains a provision that preserves the government's rights to deem any report, audit or other due diligence processes as being unreliable, and in such cases, the report shall not satisfy the requirements of the regulations, further emphasizing the need for such audits to conform to established SEC auditing standards. Comments on the proposed regulation pointed out that, should SEC not specify an applicable audit standard, it cannot also be silent or ambiguous on the auditor standards as well, or the commission will violate the plain language of the Law mandating "standards established by the Comptroller General of the United States". It is generally expected that SEC will provide specificity on both the audit standard and the auditor standard. SEC's proposal attempted to clarify its position on auditor requirements.

The OECD's guidance is gaining much momentum as "the" standard within US policy. However, a 2011 critical analysis of the standard in comparison to existing US auditing standards under SEC highlighted a number of significant inconsistencies and conflict with relevant US standards. Companies subject to the US law who implement the OECD guidance without regard for the SEC auditing standards may face legal compliance risks.

==== Reporting and disclosure ====
Companies subject to the SEC reporting requirement would be required to disclose whether the minerals used in their products originated in the DRC or adjoining countries (as defined above). The law mandates that this reporting be submitted/made available annually. Many comments to the proposed regulation asked SEC to clarify whether the report must be "furnished"—meaning it is made available to SEC but not directly incorporated within the company's formal financial report—or "submitted"—meaning the report is directly incorporated into the financial report. At first glance, this may appear to be a minor point; however, this difference is very important in determining the audit/auditor standards and related liabilities.

There are three reporting options, affirming that products are:

- "DRC Conflict Free"
- "Not DRC Conflict Free"
- "DRC Conflict Undeterminable"

thus, if it is determined that none of the minerals originated in the DRC or adjoining countries, the report must include a statement to that effect and provide an explanation of the country of origin analysis that was used to arrive at the ultimate conclusion. On the other hand, if conflict minerals originating in the DRC or adjoining countries were used (or if it is not possible to determine the country of origin of the conflict minerals used), companies would be required to state as such in the annual report. In either case, companies would also be required to make this information public by posting their annual conflict minerals report on their websites, and providing the SEC with the internet addresses where the reports may be found. Further, the proposed regulations would require companies to maintain records relating to the country of origin of conflict minerals used in their products.

The "DRC Conflict Undeterminable" option can be utilised for a temporary period only, which is four years for a "smaller reporting company", and otherwise two years.

Media outlets have reported that many companies required to file Specialized Disclosure Reports to the U.S. Securities and Exchange Commission (SEC) and any necessary conflict minerals reports for 2013 under the SEC's conflict minerals rule are struggling to meet the June 2, 2014 report filing deadline. Many impacted companies were hoping for clarification regarding filing requirements, from the United States Court of Appeals for the District of Columbia Circuit from a lawsuit filed by the National Association of Manufacturers. The appellate court's ruling left the necessary conflict minerals reporting requirements largely intact and it has been suggested that impacted companies should review the SEC's Division of Corporation Finance's response to the court's ruling which provides guidance regarding the effect of the appellate court's ruling.

On August 18, 2015, the divided D.C. Circuit Court again held the SEC's conflict materials rule violates the First Amendment. Senior Circuit Judge A. Raymond Randolph, joined by Senior Circuit Judge David B. Sentelle, weighed if the required disclosures were effective and uncontroversial. Citing news reports and a Congressional hearing, the court decided the policy was ineffective. The court next found the required label was controversial because it "is a metaphor that conveys moral responsibility for the Congo war". As such, the court struck down the conflict materials rule's disclosure requirements as a violation of corporations’ freedom of speech. Circuit Judge Sri Srinivasan dissented, writing that the required disclosures were not controversial because they were truthful.

=== Criticism of the law ===
The law has been criticised for not addressing the root causes of the conflict, leaving to the Congolese government the responsibility for providing an environment in which companies can practice due diligence and legitimately purchase the minerals they need when the reality is that mechanisms for transparency do not exist. The effect has been to halt legitimate mining ventures that provided livelihoods for people, reducing the Congo's legal exports of tantalum by 90%.

An investigation by the U.S. Government Accountability Office (GAO) found that most companies were unable to determine the source of their conflict minerals.

Technology manufacturers criticized a law which required them to label a product as not "DRC Conflict Free" as compelled speech, and in violation of the First Amendment.

== Conflict minerals regulation in the EU ==
Like the US, the EU wanted to stabilise and guarantee the steady supply of 3TG. A resolution was adopted by the European Parliament in 2010, and a proposal for a regulation was put forward by the European Commission on 5 March 2014, which reflected consultation undertaken between December 2012 and June 2013. On 16 June 2016 the European Parliament confirmed that "mandatory due diligence" would be required for "all but the smallest EU firms importing tin, tungsten, tantalum, gold and their ores".

On May 17, 2017, the EU passed Regulation (EU) 2017/821 of the Parliament and of the council on the supply chain due diligence obligations for importers of tin, tantalum, tungsten, their ores, and gold from conflict-affected and high risk areas. The regulation took effect in July 2017, with some provisions deferred until January 2021, and directly applies to certain companies that mineral ores, concentrates and processed metals containing or consisting of 3TG into the EU from conflict-affected or high-risk areas. Minimum volume thresholds which determine which companies need to comply were amended in 2020.

On August 10, 2018, the European Commission published their non-binding guidelines for the identification of conflict-affected and high-risk areas and other supply chain risks under Regulation (EU) 2017/821 of the European Parliament and of the Council. The CAHRA list provides an "indicative, non-exhaustive list" of such areas, and arrangements are made by the European Commission for the list to be periodically updated.

== Conflict resources in supply chains ==
Increases in business process outsourcing to globally dispersed production facilities means that social problems and human rights violations are no longer only an organization matter, but also often occur in companies’ supply chains and challenge supply chain managers.

Consequently, firms that are located downstream in the supply chain and that are more visible to stakeholders are particularly threatened by social supply chain problems. The recent debate concerning conflict minerals illustrates the importance of social and human rights issues in supply chain management practice as well as the emerging need to react to social conflicts.

Rapid developments continue to be made in clean energy technology including solar PV, energy storage systems, and batteries especially in the electric car market. Critical minerals mining required for these technologies has increased as demand has increased, which can drive conflict through supply chains in source countries. This contributes to increasing environmental degradation especially of water resources, as poorly or untreated mine effluents cause mass destruction of aquatic ecosystems along with rendering ground and surface water resources unsafe for consumption. This degradation increases reliance on mining jobs for survival as food chains and land are destroyed. It also incentivizes violence-for-profit mechanisms, and to address these issues increased transparency is needed in supply chains. The Responsible Business Alliance code of conduct, the largest industry coalition related to conflict minerals in supply chains, states that “falsification of records or misrepresentation of conditions or practices in the supply chain are unacceptable."

Initiatives like the Dodd–Frank Wall Street Reform and Consumer Protection Act or the OECD Due Diligence Guidance for Responsible Supply Chains of Minerals from Conflict-Affected and High-Risk Areas demand that supply chain managers verify purchased goods as ‘‘conflict-free’’ or implement measures to better manage any inability to do so.

Firms have begun to apply governance mechanisms to avoid adverse effects of conflict mineral sourcing. However, the mere transfer of responsibilities upstream in the supply chain apparently will not stop the trade with conflict minerals, notably due to two reasons:

- On the one hand, globalization has created governance gaps in a sense that companies are able to abuse human rights without being sanctioned by independent third parties. This gap results in a non-allocation of responsibility that makes the problem of human rights abuses and social conflicts within dispersed supply chains very likely to endure, particularly without collaborative approaches to remedy these deficiencies.
- On the other hand, conflict minerals usually originate from globally diverse deposits and are difficult to track within components and manufactured products. This is the case because they are mixed with minerals of different origin and added to metal alloys. Consequently, although the share of these minerals in single end products may be negligible, they are prevalent in numerous products and commodities. Together, these circumstances leave downstream firms nearly incapable of detecting risks associated with conflict minerals. Hence, the topic of conflict minerals becomes one of supply chain management rather than of individual companies’ legal or compliance divisions alone. What is needed is effective and supply-chain wide-mechanisms of traceability and due diligence that allow firms to take individual and collective responsibility as parts of supply chains.

In the context of mineral supply chains, due diligence represents a holistic concept that aims at providing a chain of custody tracking from mine to export at country level, regional tracking of mineral flows through the creation of a database on their purchases, independent audits on all actors in the supply chain, and a monitoring of the whole mineral chain by a mineral chain auditor. In this sense, due diligence transcends conventional risk management approaches that usually focus on the prevention of direct impacts on the core business activities of companies. Moreover, due diligence focuses on a maximum of transparency as an end itself while risk management is always directed towards the end of averting direct damages. However, besides the Dodd–Frank Wall Street Reform and Consumer Protection Act and the OECD Guidance, there is still a gap in due diligence practices as international norms are just emerging. Studies found that the motivation for supply chain due diligence as well as expected outcomes of these processes vary among firms. Furthermore, different barriers, drivers, and implementation patterns of supply chain due diligence have been identified in scholarly research.

== Implementation ==
Several industry organizations assist responsible companies with conducting due diligence tracking of minerals through the supply chain. Multiple international industry initiatives have been assessed for whether they fulfill the OECD guidance on conflict minerals.

- The Dubai Multi Commodities Centre is a trade zone in the United Arab Emirates that is a major market for gold and diamonds.
- The International Tin Association (ITA), previously known as the International Tin Research Institute (ITRI) until 2018, is a tin trade association based in the United Kingdom. The Tantalum-Niobium International Study Center (TIC) is a tantalum-niobium trade association based in Belgium. The organizations represent major buyers of tin, tantalum, and tungsten. Following the passage of the Dodd Frank bill, the two associations launched the ITRI Tin Supply Chain Initiative (ITSCI) in 2010.
- The London bullion market is a market for gold and silver and runs the Responsible Gold Guidance (RGG).
- The Responsible Jewellery Council is an industry organization for the watch and jewellery industry.
- The Responsible Business Alliance (RBA), previously known as the Electronic Industry Citizenship Coalition (EICC), heads the Responsible Minerals Initiative (RMI), previously known as the Conflict Free Sourcing Initiative (CFSI).

== See also ==
- Blood diamond
- Water conflict
- Oil war
- Resource war
- Coltan mining and ethics
- Energy law
