= Resource curse =

Theory that resource wealth slows growth

The resource curse, also known as the paradox of plenty or the poverty paradox, is the hypothesis that countries with an abundance of natural resources (such as fossil fuels and certain minerals) have lower economic growth, lower rates of democracy, or poorer development outcomes than countries with fewer natural resources. There are many theories and much academic debate about the reasons for and exceptions to the adverse outcomes. Most experts believe the resource curse is not universal or inevitable but affects certain types of countries or regions under certain conditions. As of at least 2023, there is no academic consensus on the effect of resource abundance on economic development.

== History ==
The idea that resources might be more of an economic curse than a blessing first emerged as early as 1711, with English publication The Spectator noting, "It is generally observed, that in countries of the greatest plenty there is the poorest living." The idea gained further traction during debates in the 1950s and the 1960s about the economic problems of low- and middle-income countries. In 1993, Richard Auty first used the term resource curse to describe how countries rich in mineral resources were unable to use that wealth to boost their economies and how, counterintuitively, these countries had lower economic growth than countries without an abundance of natural resources. An influential 1995 study by Jeffrey Sachs and Andrew Warner found a strong correlation between natural resource abundance and poor economic growth. As of 2016, hundreds of studies have evaluated the effects of resource wealth on a wide range of economic outcomes, and offered many explanations for how, why, and when a resource curse is likely to occur. While "the lottery analogy has value but also has shortcomings", many observers have likened the resource curse to the difficulties that befall lottery winners who struggle to manage the complex side effects of newfound wealth.

As of 2009, scholarship on the resource curse has increasingly shifted towards explaining why some resource-rich countries succeed and why others do not, as opposed to just investigating the average economic effects of resources. Research suggests that the manner in which resource income is spent, the system of government, institutional quality, type of resources, and early versus late industrialization all have been used to explain successes and failures.

Since 2018, a discussion has emerged concerning the potential for a resource curse related to critical materials for renewable energy. This could concern either countries with abundant renewable energy resources, such as sunshine, or critical materials for renewable energy technologies, such as neodymium, cobalt, or lithium.

Bruce Bueno de Mesquita, who developed selectorate theory, explains that when an autocratic country has lots of natural resources, the ruler's optimal strategy for political survival is to use that revenue to buy the loyalty of critical support groups and oppress the rest of the population by denying them civil liberties and underfunding education and infrastructure. Education, liberty, and infrastructure can make the people more productive, but they also make it easier for them to organize opposition movements. Since the ruler can obtain sufficient revenue from his country's natural resources, he has no need for a productive populace and therefore does not have to risk liberalization. By contrast, in a dictatorship with few natural resources, there may be a necessity for the ruler to liberalize his society somewhat so that the economy can be organized more efficiently, and to invest in education and healthcare to create a skilled and healthy workforce. Bueno de Mesquita cites Ghana and Taiwan as examples of countries where the rulers permitted democratization out of necessity.

== Economic effects ==
The International Monetary Fund classifies 51 countries as "resource-rich," which are defined as countries that derive at least 20% of exports or 20% of fiscal revenue from nonrenewable natural resources; 29 of those countries are low- and lower-middle income. Common characteristics of the 29 countries include (i) extreme dependence on resource wealth for fiscal revenues, export sales, or both; (ii) low saving rates; (iii) poor growth performance; and (iv) highly volatile resource revenues.

There is no consensus view on the effect of natural resource abundance on economic development. Publishing in 2022, academic Jing Vivian Zhan observes that different studies, all with supporting empirical evidence, show contradictory findings on this point, as well as whether the effects vary across different historical time periods. Whether studies look at short-term or long-term economic effects of resource abundance may also result in different conclusions.

A 2016 meta-study found weak support for the thesis that resource richness adversely affects long-term economic growth. The authors noted that "approximately 40% of empirical papers finding a negative effect, 40% finding no effect, and 20% finding a positive effect" but "overall support for the resource curse hypothesis is weak when potential publication bias and method heterogeneity are taken into account."

A 2021 meta-analysis of 46 natural experiments found that price increases in oil and lootable minerals increased the likelihood of conflict. A 2011 study in the journal Comparative Political Studies found that "natural resource wealth can be either a "curse" or a "blessing" and that the distinction is conditioned by domestic and international factors, both amenable to change through public policy, namely, human capital formation and economic openness."

=== Dutch disease ===
Dutch disease, defined as the relationship between the increase in the economic development of a specific sector (for example natural resources) and a decline in other sectors, first became apparent after the Dutch discovered a huge natural gas field in Groningen in 1959. The Netherlands sought to tap this resource in an attempt to export the gas for profit. However, when the gas began to flow out of the country, its ability to compete against other countries' exports declined. With the Netherlands focusing primarily on the new gas exports, the Dutch currency began to appreciate, which harmed the country's ability to export other products. With the growing gas market and the shrinking export economy, the Netherlands began to experience a recession.

This process has been witnessed in multiple countries around the world including Venezuela (oil), Angola (diamonds, oil), the Democratic Republic of the Congo (DRC) (diamonds), and various other nations. All of these countries are considered "resource-cursed"; the DRC has been called a "classic victim" of the resource curse.

Dutch disease makes tradable goods less competitive in world markets. Absent currency manipulation or a currency peg, appreciation of the currency can damage other sectors, leading to a compensating unfavorable balance of trade. As imports become cheaper in all sectors, internal employment suffers and with it the skill infrastructure and manufacturing capabilities of the nation. To compensate for the loss of local employment opportunities, government resources are used to artificially create employment. The increasing national revenue will often also result in higher government spending on health, welfare, military, and public infrastructure, and can cause burdens on the economy if done corruptly or inefficiently. While the decrease in the sectors exposed to international competition leaves the economy vulnerable to price changes in the natural resource and consequently even greater dependence on natural resource revenue, this can be managed by active and effective use of hedge instruments such as forwards, futures, options, and swaps; however, if it is managed inefficiently or corruptly, this can lead to disastrous results. Also, since productivity generally increases faster in the manufacturing sector than in the government, the economy will have lower productivity gains than before.

According to a 2020 study, giant resource discoveries led to a substantial appreciation of the real exchange rate.

=== Revenue volatility ===
Prices for some natural resources are subject to wide fluctuation; for example, crude oil prices rose from around $3 per barrel to $12/bbl in 1974 following the 1973 oil crisis and fell from $27/bbl to below $10/bbl during the 1986 glut. In the decade from 1998 to 2008, it rose from $10/bbl to $145/bbl, before falling by more than half to $60/bbl over a few months. When government revenues are dominated by inflows from natural resources (for example, 99.3% of Angola's exports came from just oil and diamonds in 2005), the volatility can disrupt government planning and debt service. Abrupt changes in economic realities that result from this often provoke widespread breaking of contracts or curtailment of social programs, eroding the rule of law and popular support. Responsible use of financial hedges can mitigate that risk to some extent.

Susceptibility to that volatility can be increased when governments choose to borrow heavily in foreign currency. Real exchange rate increases, through capital inflows or the "Dutch disease" can make it appear an attractive option by lowering the cost of interest payments on the foreign debt, and they may be considered more creditworthy because of the existence of natural resources. If the resource prices fall, however, the governments' capacity to meet debt repayments will be reduced. For example, many oil-rich countries like Nigeria and Venezuela saw rapid expansions of their debt burdens during the 1970s oil boom; however, when oil prices fell in the 1980s, bankers stopped lending to them and many of them fell into arrears, triggering penalty interest charges that made their debts grow even more. As Venezuelan oil minister and OPEC co-founder Juan Pablo Pérez Alfonzo presciently warned in 1976: "Ten years from now, twenty years from now, you will see, oil will bring us ruin... It is the devil's excrement."

A 2011 study in The Review of Economics and Statistics found that commodities have historically always shown greater price volatility than manufactured goods and that globalization has reduced this volatility. Commodities are a key reason that poor countries are more volatile than rich countries.

=== Enclave effects ===
"Oil production generally takes place in an economic enclave, meaning it has few direct effects on the rest of the economy." Michael Ross describes how there are limited economic linkages with other industries in the economy. Consequently, economic diversification may be delayed or neglected by the authorities in light of the high profits that can be obtained from limited natural resources. The attempts at diversification that do occur are often white elephant public works projects which may be misguided or mismanaged. However, even when the authorities attempt diversification in the economy, this is made difficult because resource extraction is vastly more lucrative and outcompetes other industries for the best human capital and capital investment. Successful natural resource–exporting countries often become increasingly dependent on extractive industries over time, further increasing the levels of investment in said industry as it is necessary to maintain their states' finances. There is a lack of investment in other sectors of the economy which is further exacerbated by declines in the commodity's price. While resource sectors tend to produce large financial revenues, they often add few jobs to the economy, and tend to operate as enclaves with few forward and backward connections to the rest of the economy.

=== Human capital ===
Another possible effect of the resource curse is the crowding out of human capital; countries that rely on natural resource exports may tend to neglect education because they see no immediate need for it. Resource-poor economies like Singapore, Taiwan or South Korea, by contrast, spent enormous efforts on education, and this contributed in part to their economic success (see East Asian Tigers). Other researchers, however, dispute this conclusion; they argue that natural resources generate easily taxable rents that can result in increased spending on education. However, the evidence for whether this increased spending translates to better education outcomes is mixed. A study on Brazil found that oil revenues were associated with sizable increases in education spending, but only with small improvements in education provision. Similarly, an analysis of early 20th-century oil booms in Texas and neighboring states found no effect of oil discoveries on student–teacher ratios or school attendance. However, oil-rich regions participated more intensively in the Rosenwald schoolbuilding program. A 2021 study found that European regions with a history of coal mining had 10% smaller per-capita GDP than comparable regions. The authors attribute this to lower investments in human capital.

Resource extraction–driven economies can be argued to potentially have negative effects on human capital through several different means. "Addictive economies" is a term that was coined by William Freudenburg to describe how resource extraction driven economies can lead to short-term economic benefits and sometimes shortsightedness by policymakers. Freudenberg also did research in an effort to understand more of the human capital implications of these types of economies and why results vary so widely across regions and industries. Although there is plentiful research of these types of economies, an understanding of the socioeconomic effects are still murky. Researchers Robert Purdue and Gregory Pavela did research on the West Virginia coal mining economy to further investigate these concerns. Their research includes data from all of West Virginia's 55 counties over the 13-year period from 1997 to 2009. In this research, significant ecological costs can be noted in the area which, in turn, affect the people negatively. The research also poses the fact that West Virginia ranked last on the Gallup-Healthways Well-Being Index in the years of 2009–10 in the categories of "physical health", "emotional health", "life evaluation", and "overall well-being". Arguments against the "resource curse" often claim economic benefits from the resource. The Purdue and Pavela case study reflects an example of negative economic impacts of this type of reliance on resource extraction; as even when the price of surface level coal goes up on the market, the poverty levels of people within those communities rises alongside it.

Adverse effects of natural resources on human capital formation might come through several channels. High wages in the resource extraction industry could induce young workers to drop out of school earlier in order to find employment. Evidence for this has been found for coal and fracking booms. In addition, resource booms can lower the wages of teachers relative to other workers, increasing turnover and impairing students' learning.

=== Incomes and employment ===
A study on coal mining in Appalachia suggests that "the presence of coal in the Appalachian region has played a significant part in its slow pace of economic development. Our best estimates indicate that an increase of 0.5 units in the ratio of coal revenues to personal income in a county is associated with a 0.7 percentage point decrease in income growth rates. No doubt, coal mining provides opportunities for relatively high-wage employment in the region, but its effect on prosperity appears to be negative in the longer run."

Another example was the Spanish Empire which obtained enormous wealth from its resource-rich colonies in South America in the sixteenth century. The large cash inflows from silver reduced incentives for industrial development in Spain. Innovation and investment in education were therefore neglected, so that the prerequisites for successful future development were given up. Thus, Spain soon lost its economic strength in comparison to other Western countries.

A study of US oil booms found positive effects on local employment and income during booms but found that after the boom, incomes "per capita" decreased, while "unemployment compensation payments increased relative to what they would have been if the boom had not occurred."

=== Tradeable sectors ===
A 2019 study found that active mining activity had an adverse impact on the growth of firms in tradeable sectors but a positive impact on the growth of firms in non-tradeable sectors.

== Other effects ==
Natural resources are a source of economic rent which can generate large revenues for those controlling them even in the absence of political stability and wider economic growth. Their existence is a potential source of conflict between factions fighting for a share of the revenue, which may take the form of armed separatist conflicts in regions where the resources are produced or internal conflict between different government ministries or departments for access to budgetary allocations. This tends to erode governments' abilities to function effectively.

Even when politically stable, countries whose economies are dominated by resource extraction industries tend to be less democratic and more corrupt.

=== Violence and conflict ===
A 2019 meta-analysis of 69 studies found "that there is no aggregate relationship between natural resources and conflict." According to a 2017 review study, "while some studies support the link between resource scarcity/abundance and armed conflict, others find no or only weak links." According to one academic study, a country that is otherwise typical but has primary commodity exports around 5% of GDP has a 6% risk of conflict, but when exports are 25% of GDP, the chance of conflict rises to 33%. "Ethno-political groups are more likely to resort to rebellion rather than using nonviolent means or becoming terrorists when representing regions rich in oil."

There are several factors behind the relationship between natural resources and armed conflicts. Resource wealth may increase the vulnerability of countries to conflicts by undermining the quality of governance and economic performance (the "resource curse" argument). Secondly, conflicts can occur over the control and exploitation of resources and the allocation of their revenues (the "resource war" argument). Thirdly, access to resource revenues by belligerents can prolong conflicts (the "conflict resource" argument). A 2018 study in the Journal of Conflict Resolution found that rebels were particularly likely to be able to prolong their participation in civil wars when they had access to natural resources that they could smuggle.

A 2004 literature review finds that oil makes the onset of war more likely and that lootable resources lengthen existing conflicts. One study finds the mere discovery (as opposed to just the exploitation) of petroleum resources increases the risk of conflict, as oil revenues have the potential to alter the balance of power between regimes and their opponents, rendering bargains in the present obsolete in the future. One study suggests that the rise in mineral prices over the period 1997–2010 contributed to up to 21 percent of the average country-level violence in Africa. Research shows that declining oil prices make oil-rich states less bellicose. Jeff Colgan observed that oil-rich states have a propensity to instigate international conflicts as well as to be the targets of them, which he referred to as "petro-aggression". Arguable examples include Iraq's invasions of Iran and Kuwait; Libya's repeated incursions into Chad in the 1970s and 1980s; Iran's long-standing suspicion of Western powers; and the United States' relations with Iraq, Iran, and Venezuela. It is not clear whether the pattern of petro-aggression found in oil-rich countries also applies to other natural resources besides oil. Some scholars argue that the relationship between oil and interstate war is primarily driven by the case of the Iran–Iraq War and that the overall evidence points in the direction of an oil peace.

A 2016 study finds that "oil production, oil reserves, oil dependence, and oil exports are associated with a higher risk of initiating conflict while countries enjoying large oil reserves are more frequently the target of military actions." As of 2016, the only six countries whose reported military expenditures exceeded 6 percent of GDP were significant oil producers: Oman, South Sudan, Saudi Arabia, Iraq, Libya, Algeria (data for Syria and North Korea were unavailable). A 2017 study in the American Economic Review found that mining extraction contributed to conflicts in Africa at the local level over the period 1997–2010. A 2017 study in Security Studies found that while there is a statistical relationship between oil wealth and ethnic war, the use of qualitative methods reveals "that oil has rarely been a deep cause of ethnic war."

The emergence of the Sicilian Mafia has been attributed to the resource curse. Early Mafia activity is strongly linked to Sicilian municipalities abundant in sulphur, Sicily's most valuable export commodity. A 2017 study in the Journal of Economic History also links the emergence of the Sicilian Mafia to surging demand for oranges and lemons following the late 18th-century discovery that citrus fruits cured scurvy.

A 2016 study argues that petrostates may be emboldened to act more aggressively because of the inability of allied great powers to punish the petrostate. The great powers have strong incentives not to upset the relationship with its client petrostate ally for both strategic and economic reasons.

A 2017 study found evidence of the resource curse in the American frontier period of the Western United States in the 19th century (the Wild West). The study found that "In places where mineral discoveries occurred before formal institutions were established, there were more homicides per capita historically and the effect has persisted to this day. Today, the share of homicides and assaults explained by the historical circumstances of mineral discoveries is comparable to the effect of education or income."

A 2018 study in the Economic Journal found that "oil price shocks are seen to promote coups in onshore-intensive oil countries, while preventing them in offshore-intensive oil countries." The study argues that states which have onshore oil wealth tend to build up their military to protect the oil, whereas states do not do that for offshore oil wealth. A 2020 study determined that low levels of oil and gas revenue actually increases the likelihood of nonviolent resistance in autocratic countries, despite the general logic of the resource curse.

=== Democracy and human rights ===
Research shows that oil wealth lowers levels of democracy and strengthens autocratic rule because political leaders in oil-rich countries refuse democratic development because they will have more to give up from losing power. Similarly, political leaders of oil-rich countries refuse democratic development because the political elite collects the revenues from the oil export and use the money for cementing its political, economic, and social power by controlling government and its bureaucracy, Military spending generally increases with oil wealth and so a military coup, one of the strongest tools in toppling autocracies, is less likely in oil-rich countries since dictators can quell resistance through additional funding. According to Michael Ross, "only one type of resource has been consistently correlated with less democracy and worse institutions: petroleum, which is the key variable in the vast majority of the studies that identify some type of curse." A 2014 meta-analysis confirms the negative impact of oil wealth on democratization. A 2016 study challenges the conventional academic wisdom on the relationship between oil and authoritarianism. A 2022 study found that the resource curse is tied only to easily extractable oil, not to oil that requires complex extraction. Other forms of resource wealth have also been found to strengthen autocratic rule. A 2016 study found that resource windfalls have no political impact on democracies and deeply entrenched authoritarian regimes, but significantly exacerbate the autocratic nature of moderately authoritarian regimes. A third 2016 study finds that while it is accurate that resource richness has an adverse impact on the prospects of democracy, this relationship has held only since the 1970s. A 2017 study found that the presence of multinational oil companies increases the likelihood of state repression. Another 2017 study found that the presence of oil reduced the likelihood that a democracy would be established after the breakdown of an authoritarian regime. A 2018 study found that the relationship between oil and authoritarianism primarily holds after the end of the Cold War. The study argues that without American or Soviet support, resource-poor authoritarian regimes had to democratize, but resource-rich authoritarian regimes resisted domestic pressures to democratize. Prior to the 1970s, oil-producing countries did not have democratization levels that differed from other countries. Oil-abundant authoritarian governments are suggested to earn high levels of income for oil but spend an extremely minimal amount on social expenditures for individuals being ruled and democracies are suggested to do the opposite.

Research by Stephen Haber and Victor Menaldo found that increases in natural resource reliance do not induce authoritarianism but may instead promote democratization. The authors say that their method rectifies the methodological biases of earlier studies which revolve around random effects: "Numerous sources of bias may be driving the results [of earlier studies on the resource curse], the most serious of which is omitted variable bias induced by unobserved country-specific and time-invariant heterogeneity." In other words, this means that countries might have specific, enduring traits that get left out of the model, which could increase the explanation power of the argument. The authors claim that the chances of this happening are larger when assuming random effects, an assumption that does not allow for what the authors call "unobserved country-specific heterogeneity". The criticisms have themselves been subject to criticism. One study reexamined the Haber-Menaldo analysis by using Haber and Menaldo's own data and statistical models. It reported that their conclusions were only valid for the period before the 1970s, but since about 1980, there has been a pronounced resource curse. Authors Andersen and Ross suggest that oil wealth became a hindrance to democratic transitions only after the transformative events of the 1970s, which enabled the governments of developing countries to capture the oil rents that were previously siphoned off by foreign-owned firms.

There are two ways that oil wealth might negatively affect democratization. The first is that oil strengthens authoritarian regimes, making transitions to democracy less likely. The second is that oil wealth weakens democracies. Research generally supports the first theory but is mixed on the second. A 2019 study found that oil wealth is associated with increases in the level of personalism in dictatorships.

Both pathways might result from the ability of oil-rich states to provide citizens with a combination of generous benefits and low taxes. In many economies that are not resource-dependent, governments tax citizens, who demand efficient and responsive government in return. This bargain establishes a political relationship between rulers and subjects. In countries whose economies are dominated by natural resources, however, rulers don't need to tax their citizens because they have a guaranteed source of income from natural resources. Because the country's citizens aren't being taxed, they have less incentive to be watchful with how government spends its money. In addition, those benefiting from mineral resource wealth may perceive an effective and watchful civil service and civil society as a threat to the benefits that they enjoy, and they may take steps to thwart them. As a result, citizens are often poorly served by their rulers, and if the citizens complain, money from the natural resources enables governments to pay for armed forces to keep the citizens in check. It has been argued that rises and falls in the price of petroleum correlate with rises and falls in the implementation of human rights in major oil-producing countries.

Corrupt members of national governments may collude with resource extraction companies to override their own laws and ignore objections made by indigenous inhabitants. The United States Senate Foreign Relations Committee report entitled "Petroleum and Poverty Paradox" states that "too often, oil money that should go to a nation's poor ends up in the pockets of the rich, or it may be squandered on grand palaces and massive showcase projects instead of being invested productively." A 2016 study found that mining in Africa substantially increases corruption; an individual within 50 kilometres (31 mi) of a recently opened mine is 33% more likely to have paid a bribe the past year than a person living within 50 km of mines that "will open" in the future. The former also pay bribes for permits more frequently, and perceive their local councilors to be more corrupt. In a study examining the effects of mining on local communities in Africa, researchers concluded that active mining areas are associated with more bribe payments, particularly police bribes. Their findings were consistent with the hypothesis that mining increases corruption.

The Center for Global Development argues that governance in resource-rich states would be improved by the government making universal, transparent, and regular payments of oil revenues to citizens and then attempting to reclaim it through the tax system, which they argue will fuel public demand for the government to be transparent and accountable in its management of natural resource revenues and in the delivery of public services.

One study found that "oil producing states dependent on exports to the USA exhibit lower human rights performance than those exporting to China". The authors argue that this stems from the fact that US relationships with oil producers were formed decades ago, before human rights became part of its foreign policy agenda.

One study found that resource wealth in authoritarian states lowers the probability of adopting freedom of information laws. However, democracies that are resource-rich are more likely than resource-poor democracies to adopt such laws.

One study looking at oil wealth in Colombia found "that when the price of oil rises, legislators affiliated with right-wing paramilitary groups win office more in oil-producing municipalities. Consistent with the use of force to gain power, positive price shocks also induce an increase in paramilitary violence and reduce electoral competition: fewer candidates run for office, and winners are elected with a wider vote margin. Ultimately, fewer centrist legislators are elected to office, and there is diminished representation at the center."

A 2018 study in International Studies Quarterly found that oil wealth was associated with weaker private liberties (freedom of movement, freedom of religion, the right to property, and freedom from forced labor).

Research by Nathan Jensen indicates that countries that have resource wealth are considered to have a greater political risk for foreign direct investors. He argues that this is because leaders in resource-rich countries are less sensitive to being punished in elections if they take actions that adversely affect foreign investors. Countries with higher natural resource export share show a correlation between receiving Foreign direct investment and decreasing democracy index, while this correlation is opposite for countries with low natural resource export share.

=== Distribution ===
According to a 2017 study, "social forces condition the extent to which oil-rich nations provide vital public services to the population. Although it is often assumed that oil wealth leads to the formation of a distributive state that generously provides services in the areas of water, sanitation, education, health care, or infrastructure... quantitative tests reveal that oil-rich nations who experience demonstrations or riots provide better water and sanitation services than oil-rich nations who do not experience such dissent. Subsequent tests find that oil-rich nations who experience nonviolent, mass-based movements provide better water and sanitation services than those who experience violent, mass-based movements."

=== Gender inequality ===
Studies suggest countries with abundant natural resources have higher levels of gender inequality in the areas of wages, labor force participation, violence, and education. Research links gender inequality in the Middle East to resource wealth. According to Michael Ross:

Oil production affects gender relations by reducing the presence of women in the labor force. The failure of women to join the nonagricultural labor force has profound social consequences: it leads to higher fertility rates, less education for girls, and less female influence within the family. It also has far-reaching political consequences: when fewer women work outside the home, they are less likely to exchange information and overcome collective action problems; less likely to mobilize politically, and to lobby for expanded rights; and less likely to gain representation in government. That leaves oil-producing states with atypically strong patriarchal cultures and political institutions.

Ross argues that in oil-rich countries, across the Middle East, Africa, Latin America, and Asia, the need for female labor reduces as export-oriented and female-dominated manufacturing is ousted by Dutch disease effects. This hypothesis has received further support by the analysis of mining booms in Africa. For the United States, the evidence is mixed. State-level comparisons suggest that resource wealth leads to lower levels of female labor force participation, lower turnout and fewer seats held by women in legislatures. On the other hand, a county-level analysis of resource booms in the early 20th century found an overall positive effect of resource wealth on single women's labor force participation.

Research has also linked resource wealth to greater domestic violence, and a gender gap in education.

=== International cooperation ===
Research finds that the more that states depend on oil exports, the less cooperative they become. They become less likely to join intergovernmental organizations, accept the compulsory jurisdiction of international judicial bodies, and agree to binding arbitration for investment disputes.

=== Foreign aid ===
There is an argument in political economy that foreign aid can have the same negative effects in the long run towards development as in the case of the resource curse. The so-called "aid curse" results from giving perverse political incentives to a weak body of civil servants, lowering politicians' accountability towards citizens and decreasing economic pressure thanks to the income of an unearned resource to mitigate economic crisis. When foreign aid represents a major source of revenue to governments, especially in low-income countries, state-building capacity is hindered by undermining responsiveness toward taxpayers or by decreasing the incentive for governments to look for different sources of income or the increase in taxation.

=== Crime ===
A 2018 study found that in Texas, "a 1% increase in the value of oil reserves increases murder by 0.16%, robbery by 0.55% and larceny by 0.18%."

== Petro-aggression ==
Petro-aggression is the tendency for a petrostate to be involved in international conflicts, or to be the target of them. The term was popularized by a 2013 book by Jeff Colgan that found that petrostates (states with 10% or more GDP from petroleum) are 250 percent more likely to instigate international conflicts than a typical country.

Examples of oil-rich countries initiating conflicts include:

- Russia (War in Donbas, Russian invasion of Ukraine)
- Soviet Union (Soviet–Afghan War)

As of 1999, it remained unclear whether the pattern of petro-aggression found in oil-rich countries also applies to other natural resources besides oil.

On a sub-national (civil war) level, 'booty futures' contracts have enabled rebels to finance their insurgencies.

== Examples in biology and ecology ==
Microbial ecology studies have also addressed if resource availability modulates the cooperative or competitive behaviour in bacteria populations. When resources availability is high, bacterial populations become competitive and aggressive with each other, but when environmental resources are low, they tend to be cooperative and mutualistic.

Ecological studies have hypothesised that competitive forces between animals are major in high carrying capacity zones (i.e., near the Equator), where biodiversity is higher, because of natural resources abundance. This abundance or excess of resources causes animal populations to have r-reproduction strategies (many offspring, short gestation, less parental care, and a short time until sexual maturity), so competition is affordable for populations. Also, competition could select populations to have r-behaviour in a positive feedback regulation.

Contrary, in low carrying capacity zones (i.e. far from the Equator), where environmental conditions are harsh, K-strategies are common (longer life expectancy, produce relatively fewer offspring and tend to be altricial, requiring extensive care by parents when young) and populations tend to have cooperative or mutualistic behaviors. If populations have a competitive behaviour in hostile environmental conditions, they mostly are filtered out (die) by environmental selection; hence, populations in hostile conditions are selected to be cooperative.

Mutualism hypothesis was first described while Peter Kropotkin studied the fauna of the Siberian steppe, where environmental conditions are harsh, he found animals tend to cooperate in order to survive. Extreme competition is observed in the Amazonian forest where life requires low energy to find resources (i.e., sunlight for plants); hence, life could afford being selected by biotic factors (i.e., competition) rather than abiotic factors.

== Criticisms ==
A 2008 study argues that the critical variable is the relative abundance of a country's natural resources, rather than the significance of resource exports to its economy. When comparing relative abundance across countries, the study reports that resource wealth correlates with slightly increased economic growth, and slightly fewer armed conflicts. Meanwhile, the report argued, economic dependency on resource exports correlates to poorly written policies rather than a higher volume of resources available to exploit. The causation goes in the opposite direction: conflicts and bad policy create a heavy dependence on a country's export of natural resources. When a country's chaos and economic policies scare off foreign investors and cause local entrepreneurs to pursue markets abroad, the economy becomes skewed. Factories may close and businesses may flee, but the natural resources remain available; resource extraction becomes the "default sector" that continues to function after other industries have declined.

A 2008 article by Thad Dunning argues that while resource revenues can strengthen authoritarian regimes, they can also promote democracy in certain circumstances. In countries where natural resource rents are a relatively small portion of the overall economy, and the non-resource economy is unequally distributed, resources rents can serve as a source of funding for social welfare policies, reducing economic elites' fear of ceding power through fiscal redistribution. Dunning suggests Venezuela's democratic consolidation during the oil boom of the 1970s is a key example of this phenomenon.

A 2011 study argues that framing the oil abundance as a curse fails to consider cross-country differences and dependencies arising from global shocks, such as changes in technology and the price of oil. The researchers studied data from the World Bank over the period 1980–2006 for 53 countries, covering 85% of world GDP and 81% of world proven oil reserves. They found that oil abundance positively affected both short-term growth and long-term income levels. In a companion paper, using data on 118 countries over the period 1970–2007, they show that it is the volatility in commodity prices, rather than abundance per se, that drives the resource curse paradox.

In Carbon Democracy: Political Power in the Age of Oil, the political theorist Timothy Mitchell argues that discussions of the "oil curse" fail to consider the specific nature of oil, particularly its extraction, processing, shipping and consumption. Mitchell argues that this inattentiveness to the processes surrounding oil are linked to a narrow conception of democracy that presumes the same elements of democracy can be implemented worldwide.

== See also ==
- Banana republic – Term for a politically unstable country
- Democracy and economic growth
- Dutch disease – Theory in economics
- Exploitation colonialism – Process of extracting resources from the earth
- Freight equalization policy – Indian economic policy
- High-level equilibrium trap – Environmental historical concept
- Imperialism – Extension of rule over foreign nations
- Passive income – Income that requires little to no effort to earn and maintain
  - Rent seeking – Growing one's existing wealth without creating new wealth
  - Rentier capitalism – Capitalism featuring rent-seeking without wealth creation
  - Rentier state – Government which derives all or most of its income from foreigners
- Petrostate – Countries that primarily produce oil or natural gas
- Political corruption – Use of power by government officials for illegitimate private gain
  - Bribery – Corrupt solicitation, acceptance, or transfer of value in exchange for official action
- Public choice theory – Economic theory applied to political science
- Resource monotonicity – Mathematical principle
- Unequal exchange – Term in Marxist economics
- Juan Pablo Pérez Alfonzo – Venezuelan politician (1903–1979), the oil minister of Venezuela who spoke of the resource curse.
