= Booty futures contract =

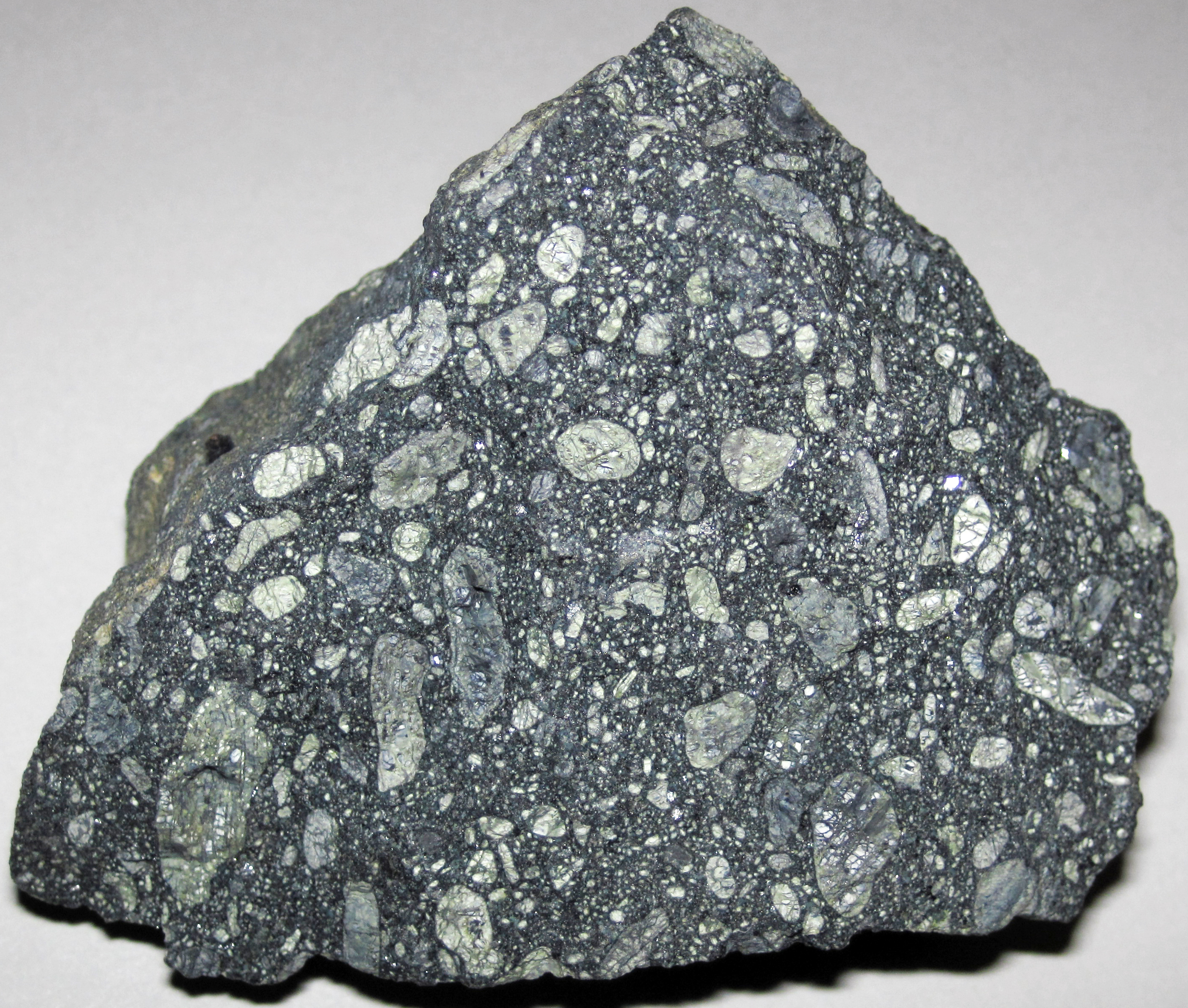
Kimberlite, a volcanic rock that contains diamonds, from the Koidu area mines involved in the Sierra Leone booty future

Booty futures is a term coined by the political scientist Michael L. Ross to describe the sale, by a government or rebel group engaged in a civil war, of the future right to exploit natural resources that the seller does not yet control, or controls only precariously.

The proceeds are typically used to finance the military campaign needed to capture or defend the resources in question. Ross argued that this market is distinctively harmful: unlike the looting of resources already under a combatant's control, the sale of booty futures channels money to factions precisely because they are too weak or too poor to win without it, and can thereby start or prolong conflicts that would otherwise not be viable.

== Concept ==
The term adapts the financial notion of a futures contract to wartime political economy. In Ross's usage, ordinary "booty" refers to resources a combatant already holds and can extract or loot, such as alluvial diamonds mined by rebel groups in Sierra Leone. Booty futures, by contrast, are claims on resources the seller hopes to control after military success. The buyer, usually a foreign firm or a neighbouring government, pays in advance, in cash, weapons, or military services, and assumes the risk that the seller loses the war and the contract becomes worthless.

Because the buyer bears this risk, futures sell at a steep discount to the value of the underlying resource. The mechanism is therefore most attractive to factions that are otherwise poorly financed, and most feasible for resources whose exploitation requires large fixed investments, such as offshore oil or deep-shaft and kimberlite mining, since these cannot simply be looted and must eventually pass through firms willing to deal with whoever holds power.

Ross identified three ways the market can worsen conflict. First, it can enable wars that would not otherwise begin, by giving a militarily weak challenger access to finance. Second, it can prolong wars, since a losing side can mortgage resources it no longer controls to fund continued fighting. Third, it can revive defeated factions by giving exiled or beaten groups a means of re-arming. In this respect booty futures invert the usual logic of the resource curse literature, in which resource wealth funds the side that already controls extraction.

== Cases ==
Ross developed the concept from a comparative study of civil wars of the 1990s, principally in sub-Saharan Africa.

=== Sierra Leone ===
In 1995, the National Provisional Ruling Council government of Sierra Leone, near military collapse against the Revolutionary United Front, hired the South African private military company Executive Outcomes. The government, short of cash, compensated the firm in part through diamond-mining concessions granted to Branch Energy, a company commercially linked to Executive Outcomes, including rights over kimberlite deposits at Koidu that the government did not securely control at the time.

=== Republic of the Congo ===
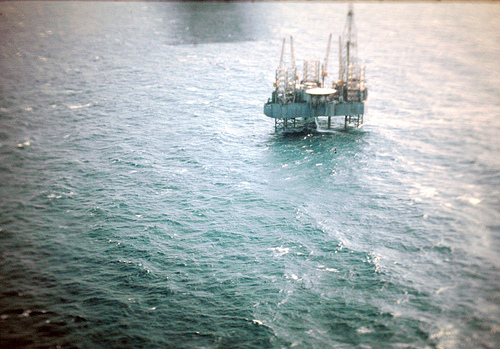
Offshore oil rig

The petroleum industry in the Republic of the Congo (Congo-Brazzaville) exploits offshore oil reserves in the Atlantic since 1949. During the 1997 civil war, the militia of former president Denis Sassou Nguesso was reported to have financed its campaign against the elected government of Pascal Lissouba partly through advances secured against future oil production, and Lissouba publicly accused the French oil company Elf Aquitaine of backing Sassou Nguesso's return to power. Elf denied involvement in the conflict, and the allegation was never tested in court: a complaint Lissouba brought against the company in Paris after his overthrow did not lead to prosecution, and the 2003 trial of former Elf executives in the Elf affairconcerned embezzlement of company funds rather than the financing of the war.

Later investigative reporting complicated the picture of Elf as the patron of one side: according to the International Consortium of Investigative Journalists, Elf executives also arranged a loan to the Lissouba government during the war, although Lissouba fled before payment was made. Lissouba's government had earlier mortgaged future oil output to raise funds through Elf and other creditors, continuing a system of oil-backed pre-financing established in the country in the 1980s. Sassou Nguesso won the war and resumed the presidency.

=== Zaire / Democratic Republic of the Congo ===
In 1996–1997, as the Alliance of Democratic Forces for the Liberation of Congo (AFDL) under Laurent-Désiré Kabila advanced across Zaire (Congo-Kinshasa), the rebel movement signed mining agreements with foreign companies covering copper, cobalt, zinc and diamond deposits that remained under the nominal control of the Mobutu Sese Seko government. The contracts, reportedly worth several hundred million US dollars, provided the AFDL with funds and political standing before it captured Kinshasa in May 1997. Similar deals recurred during the Second Congo War, when both the government and rebel factions assigned mineral rights in territory they did not hold.

=== Angola ===
In Angola, following the collapse of the 1992 elections and the return to war with UNITA, the MPLA government raised money for arms purchases through oil-backed loans secured against future production from offshore fields, some of which were still under development. Analysts have treated these transactions as a state-side variant of the same mechanism, since future resource revenues were pledged to finance immediate war needs.

== Reception and policy implications ==
The concept has been taken up in the literature on conflict resources and the economics of civil war as one of several mechanisms linking natural resources to conflict onset and duration, alongside looting, extortion and grievance-based explanations. Empirically, the mechanism is difficult to test systematically: the transactions are usually secret, the documentary record rests on journalism and post-war litigation, and the number of clearly identified cases is small. Ross himself presented the argument through case comparison rather than statistical analysis.

The principal policy proposal associated with the concept is to undermine the market by making the contracts unenforceable, for example through international rules denying recognition to resource concessions sold by rebel movements or unconstitutional governments. Buyers could then not expect courts or successor regimes to honour them. Such proposals parallel measures against conflict diamonds such as the Kimberley Process Certification Scheme, which targets trade in resources already extracted rather than in future rights.

== See also ==
- Resource curse
- Conflict resource
- Greed versus grievance
- Odious debt
- Private military company
