= Foreign involvement in the Venezuelan presidential crisis =

Aspect of the 2019 crisis

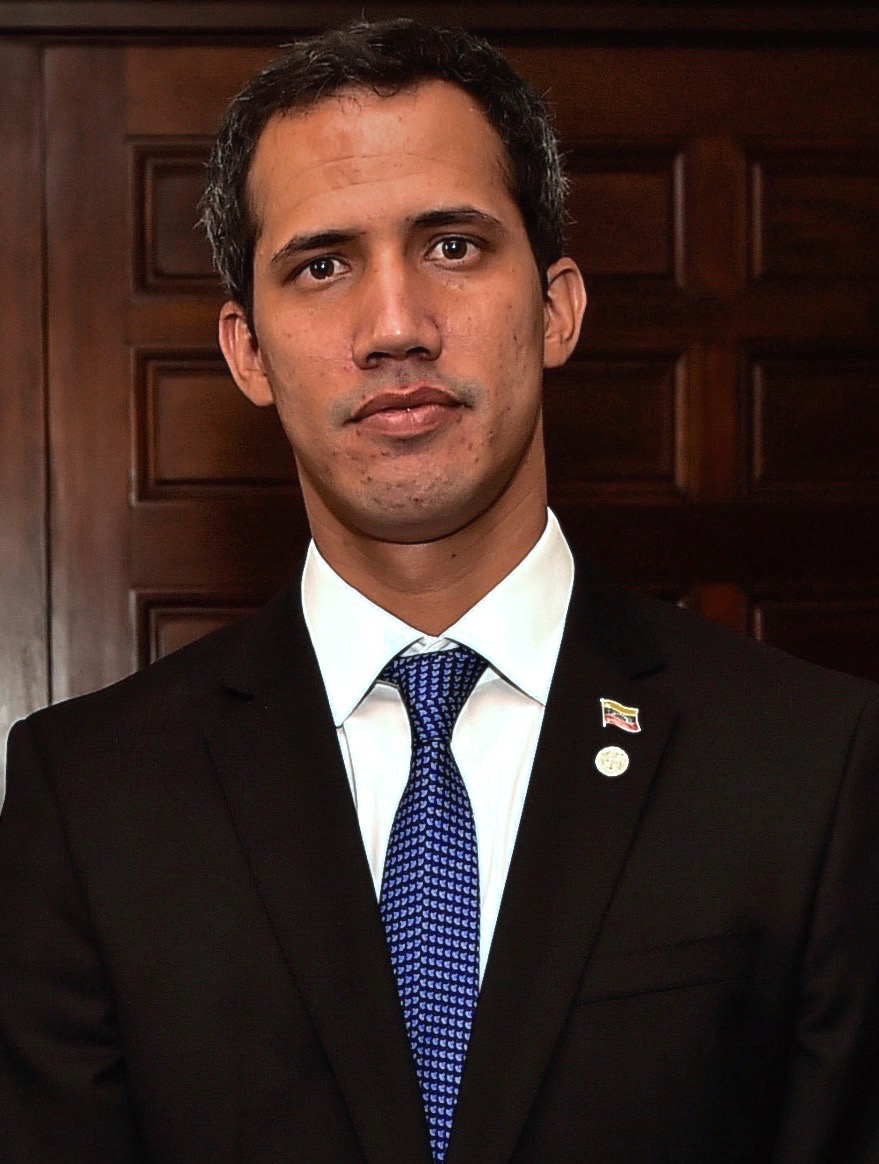
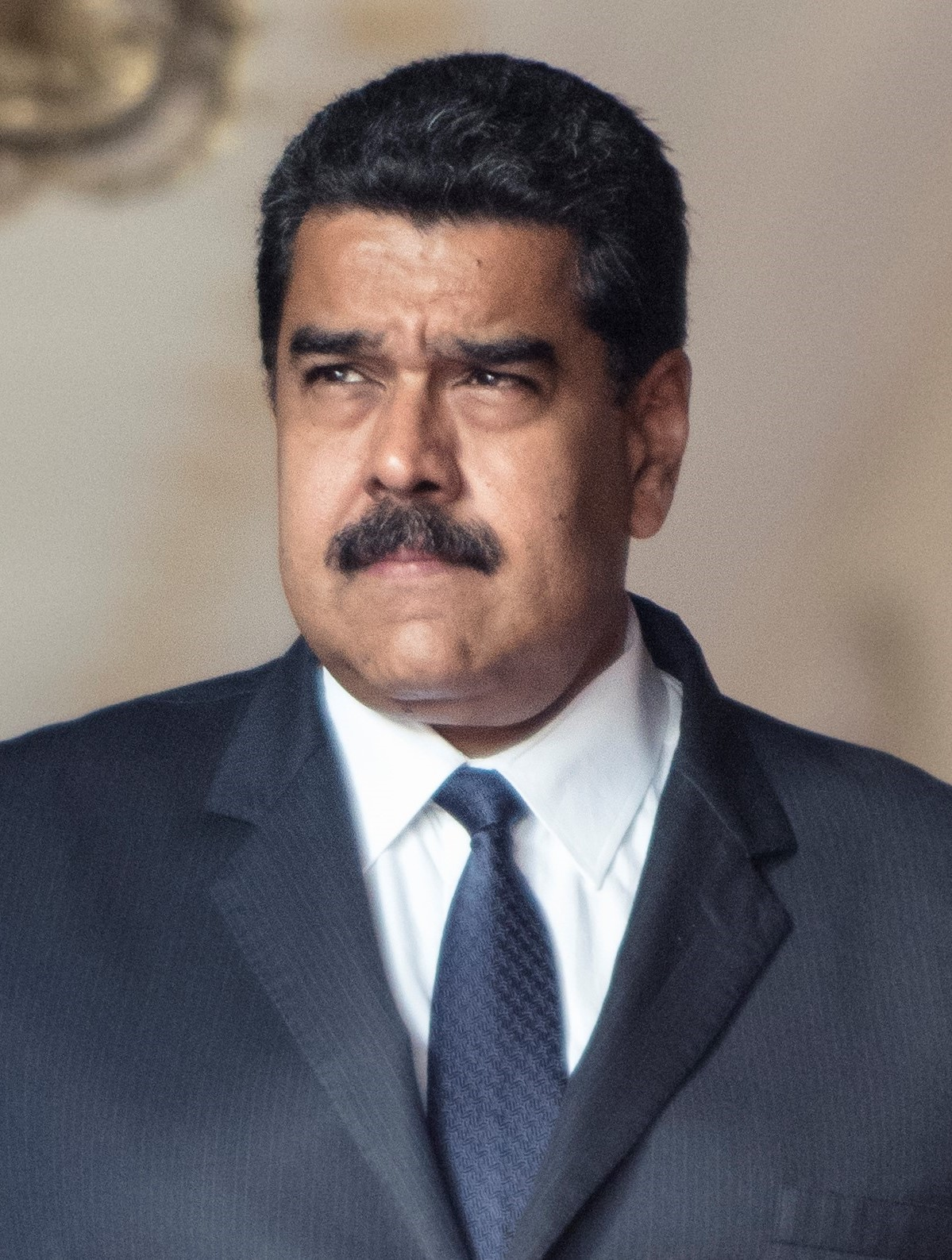
Juan Guaidó (left), Nicolás Maduro (right)

During the 2019 Venezuelan presidential crisis, AP News reported that "familiar geopolitical sides" had formed, with allies Russia, China, Iran, Turkey, Syria, and Cuba supporting Maduro, and the US, Canada, and most of Western Europe supporting Juan Guaidó as interim president. Amid widespread condemnation, President Maduro was sworn in on 10 January 2019, and the President of the National Assembly, Guaidó, was declared the interim President by that body on 23 January 2019. Intervention by the United States in Venezuela was criticized by allies of Nicolás Maduro and political figures from the left spectrum; Maduro's government stated that the crisis was a "coup d'état led by the United States to topple him and control the country's oil reserves." Guaidó denied the coup allegations, saying peaceful volunteers backed his movement.

== Background ==
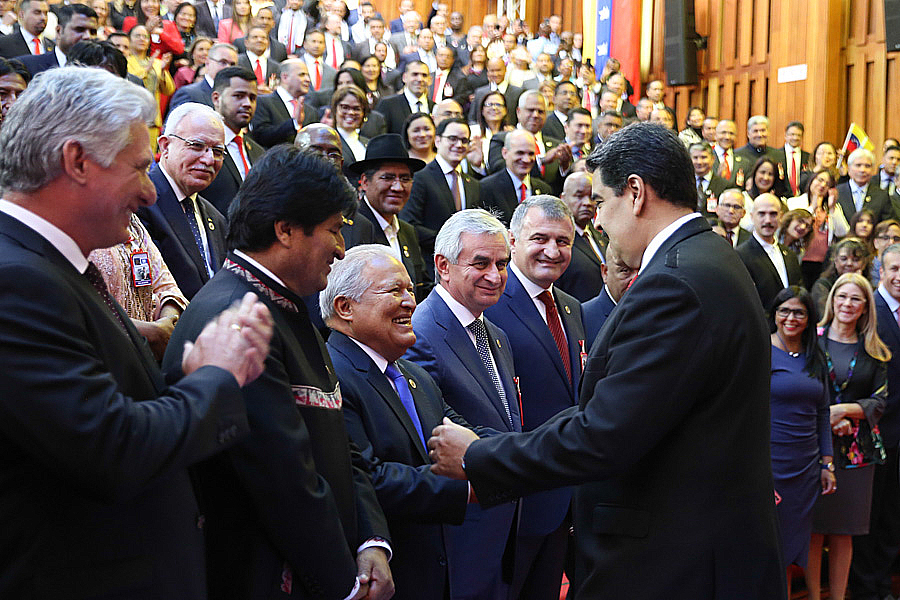
Presidents of Cuba, Bolivia and El Salvador greet Maduro at Maduro's second inauguration on 10 January 2019

Hugo Chávez alleged that there was U.S. intervention in Venezuela during his presidency. In early 2015, the Maduro government accused the United States of attempting to overthrow him. The Venezuelan government performed elaborate actions to respond to such alleged attempts and to convince the public that its claims were true. The reactions included the arrest of Antonio Ledezma in February 2015, forcing American tourists to go through travel requirements and holding military marches and public exercises "for the first time in Venezuela's democratic history". After the United States ordered sanctions to be placed on seven Venezuelan officials for human rights violations, Maduro used anti-U.S. rhetoric to bump up his approval ratings. However, according to Venezuelan political scientist Isabella Picón, only about 15% of Venezuelans believed in the alleged coup attempt accusations at the time.

In 2016, Maduro again said that the United States was attempting to assist the opposition with a coup attempt. On 12 January 2016, the Secretary General of the Organization of American States (OAS), Luis Almagro, threatened to invoke the Inter-American Democratic Charter, an instrument used to defend democracy in the Americas when threatened, when opposition National Assembly member was barred from taking their seats by the Maduro-aligned Supreme Court. Human rights organizations such as Human Rights Watch, and the Human Rights Foundation called for the OAS to invoke the Democratic Charter. After more controversies and pursuing a recall on Maduro, on 2 May 2016, opposition members of the National Assembly met with OAS officials to ask for the body to implement the Democratic Charter. Two days later on 4 May, the Maduro government called for a meeting the next day with the OAS, with Venezuelan Foreign Minister Delcy Rodríguez stating that the United States and the OAS were attempting to overthrow Maduro. On 17 May 2016 in a national speech, Maduro called OAS Secretary General Luis Almagro "a traitor" and stated that he worked for the CIA. Almagro sent a letter rebuking Maduro, and refuting the allegation.

The Trump administration described Maduro's government as a "dictatorship". When meeting with Latin American leaders during the seventy-second session of the UN General Assembly, President Donald Trump discussed possible United States military intervention in Venezuela, to which they all denied the offer. President Maduro's son, Nicolás Maduro Guerra, stated during the 5th Constituent Assembly of Venezuela session that if the United States were to attack Venezuela, "the rifles would arrive in New York, Mr. Trump, we would arrive and take the White House".

A memo obtained by Agence France-Presse indicated USAID would allocate $41.9 million of its Central American aid fund to support Guaidó administering Venezuela, including $19.4 million for salaries, travel, and "other costs necessary to ensure full deployment of a transparent financial management system and other activities necessary for a democratic transition," as well as $2 million to support the opposition in negotiations with the Maduro administration.

== Military involvement ==
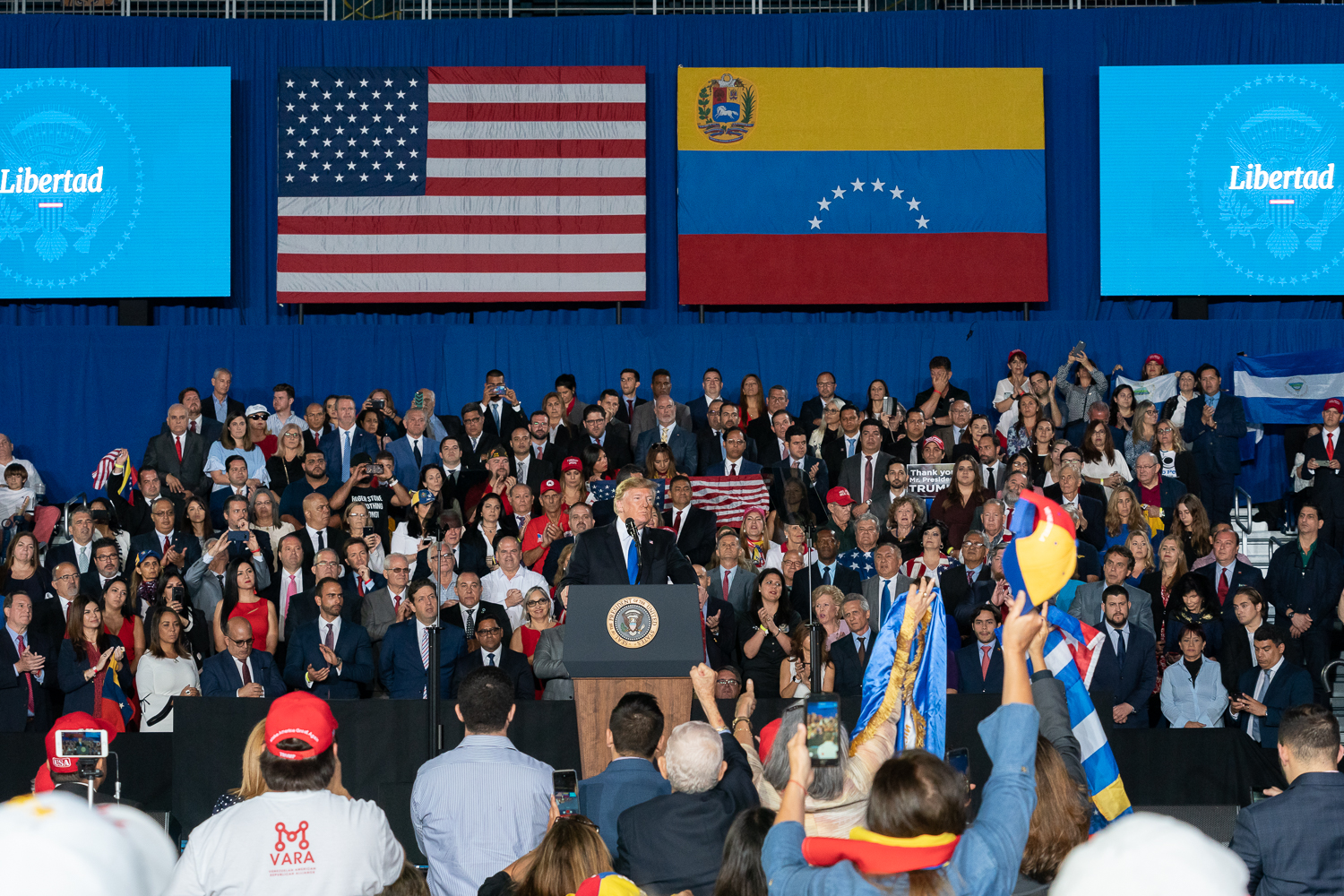
On 18 February, President Donald Trump advised Venezuelan soldiers to renounce loyalty to Nicolás Maduro.

In early 2019, with Cuban and Russian-backed security forces in the country, United States military involvement became the subject of speculation. Senior U.S. officials have declared that "all options are on the table", but have also said that "our objective is a peaceful transfer of power". Maduro announced that state funds would be used to purchase new military equipment, saying "we are going to make enough investment so that Venezuela has all the anti-aircraft and anti-missile defense systems ... even the most modern in the world, Venezuela will have them because Venezuela wants peace".

Colombian guerrillas from National Liberation Army (ELN) have also vowed to defend Maduro, with ELN leaders in Cuba stating that they are drafting plans to provide military assistance to Maduro. The Redes Foundation denounced in the Colombian Public Ministry that armed groups made up of ELN members and FARC dissidents, supported by the Bolivarian National Police and FAES officials, murdered two Venezuelans, Eduardo José Marrero and Luigi Ángel Guerrero, during a protest in the frontier city of San Cristóbal, on Táchira state.

Michael Shifter, president of the Inter-American Dialogue think tank, stated that "military action of the United States against Venezuela would be contrary to the movements of the Trump administration to retire troops from Syria or Afghanistan." According to professor Erick Langer of Georgetown University, "Cuba and Russia have already intervened".

According to the Cuban government, more than 20,000 Cubans are working in Venezuela, The exact number of Cuban military operatives in Venezuela is unclear. According to a 2014 Brookings Institution report, there were hundreds to thousands of Cuban intelligence operatives and military advisors in Venezuela, with similar numbers reported in 2019. US National Security Advisor John R. Bolton claimed that the "fear of the 20,000 to 25,000 Cuban security forces in the country" prevented the success of the 2019 Venezuelan uprising. Cuba director of US affairs Carlos Fernández de Cossío disputes Bolton's claim, stating that Cuba does not participate in military or security affairs in Venezuela, "[o]nly medical staff in humanitarian mission" according to Cuba Foreign Affairs Ministry. Defected Venezuelan Lieutenant José Montiel López in the US said in an interview with The Washington Post that Cuban military disguised as civilians acted as "our supervisors and decision-makers". According to sixteen Cuban doctors interviewed by The New York Times, Cuban medical staff in Venezuela was also involved in manipulation and withholding of medicines to coerce patients to support Maduro during elections. During the uprising, Trump threatened a "full and complete embargo, together with highest-level sanctions" on Cuba if its troops do not cease operations in Venezuela.

In April 2019, private Iranian airline Mahan Air launched direct flights from Tehran to Caracas. The company is accused of transporting military equipment to Middle East war zones. The airline was blacklisted by the United States in 2011 for providing support to Islamic Revolutionary Guard Corps (IRGC)–designated as a terrorist organization by the governments of Bahrain, Saudi Arabia and the United States (in 2019). The governments of France and Germany banned Mahan Air in early 2019 for similar reasons. According to Fox News, the launch of Tehran-Caracas flight "has signified a growing relationship between the two nations". Iranian Foreign Minister Mohammad Javad Zarif, suggested that Iran could send IRGC personnel to Venezuela to protect President Maduro. The offer was condemned by OAS Secretary General Luis Almagro. According to the Newsweek, "The presence of Russian, Chinese and Iranian planes in Caracas has outraged the U.S., which already has troops based in neighboring Colombia and in other countries across a region long targeted by Washington's efforts to halt the spread of leftist ideologies."

According to Giancarlo Fiorella, writing in Foreign Affairs, the "loudest calls for intervention are coming not from the White House and its media mouthpieces but from some members of the Venezuelan opposition and from residents of the country desperate for a solution—any solution—to their years-long plight." Fiorella states that "talk of invoking article 187(11) has become commonplace" in Venezuela, adding that "the push for a military intervention in Venezuela is most intense not among hawks in Washington but inside the country itself". Article 187 of the Constitution of Venezuela provides: "It shall be the function of the National Assembly: (11) To authorize the operation of Venezuelan military missions abroad or foreign military missions within the country." In every demonstration summoned by Guaidó, there were numerous signs demanding the application of Article 187. Following the unsuccessful attempt to bring humanitarian aid into Venezuela on 23 February, a political faction supported by National Assembly deputy María Corina Machado began to demand application of Article 187, to "open the way" for "foreign intervention in order to prevent crimes against humanity". Former mayor of Caracas, Antonio Ledezma also called for application of 187, and the calls for intervention have taken hold outside of the political realm, with a March poll showing 87.5% support for foreign intervention. (Note: Foreign Affairs states "this figure is likely inflated—the surveys do not define what a military intervention under 187(11) would look like.) Guaidó said he would call for intervention "when the time comes", but in media interviews, he did not state he supported removing Maduro by force.

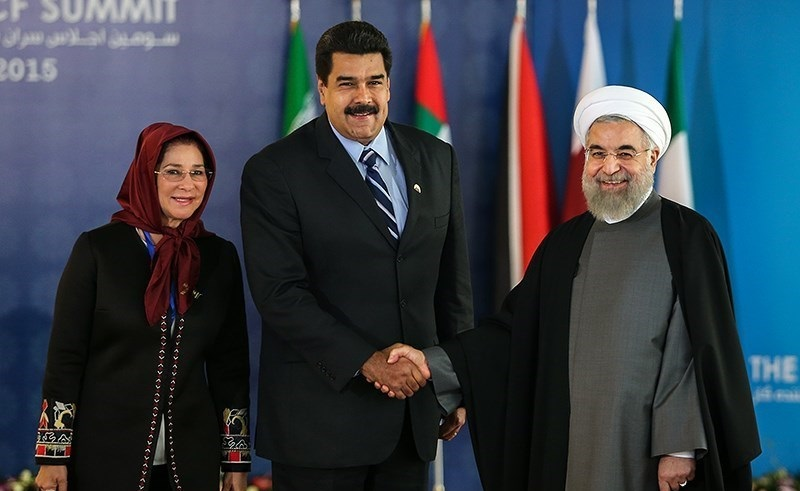
Maduro with Iranian President Hassan Rouhani in Tehran, Iran (2015)

The National Assembly approved in July 2019 the reincorporation of Venezuela to the Inter-American Treaty of Reciprocal Assistance (Tratado Interamericano de Asistencia Recíproca). Known as the Rio Pact or Rio Treaty. By its Spanish-language acronym, TIAR is a mutual defense pact signed in 1947 that has never been enacted. Its premise is that "an armed attack by any State against an American State shall be considered an attack against all American States". Venezuela retired from TIAR in 2013; Deputy Francisco Sucre stated that Chávez had removed Venezuela from the pact in a "strategy to isolate Venezuela by a totalitarian system mirroring [Cuba]". Venezuela's reincorporation to the pact "can be used to request military assistance against foreign troops inside the country".

In December 2019, Secretary of State Mike Pompeo stated that the United States did not plan a military intervention in Venezuela, saying that "we have said that all options are on the table", but that "we have learned from history that the risks from using military force are significant".

== Russian presence ==
=== 2018 ===
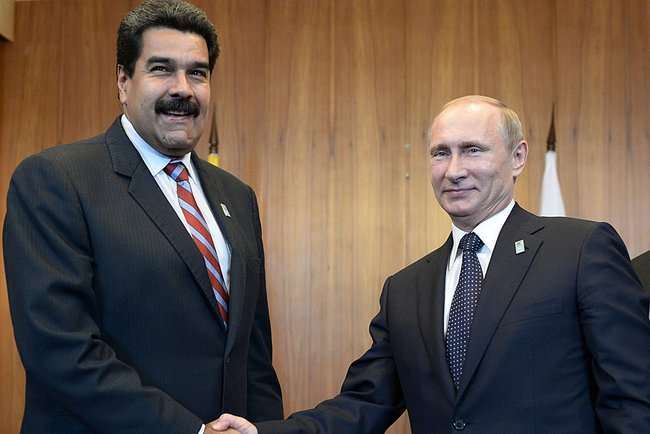
Russian president Putin meeting with Maduro in Brazil (2014)

Reuters reported that Russian mercenaries associated with the Wagner Group were in Venezuela to defend Maduro's government. Professor Robert Ellis of the United States Army War College described 400 Wagner Group mercenaries provided by Russia as the "palace guard of Nicolás Maduro". Kremlin spokesman Dmitry Peskov denied the deployment of Russian mercenaries, calling it "fake news".

Two nuclear weapon-capable Russian planes landed in Venezuela in December 2018 in what Reuters called a "show of support for Maduro's socialist government".

=== 2019 ===
On 3 March 2019, Russian Federation Council speaker Valentina Matviyenko told Venezuelan Vice President Delcy Rodríguez that Russia would make every effort to prevent military intervention in Venezuela and believes that the crisis was artificially created by the US, which can be solved only through dialogue.

On 23 March 2019, two Russian planes landed in Venezuela carrying 99 troops and 35 tonnes of matériel. Alexey Seredin from the Russian Embassy in Caracas said the two planes were "part of an effort to maintain Maduro's defense apparatus, which includes Sukhoi fighter jets and anti-aircraft systems purchased from Russia". On 29 March, a flight simulation center for Russian helicopters was launched in Venezuela, and another flight simulator center is planned, as is a plant to produce Russian arms. Russia supplies arms, special forces, and military advisors to Venezuela, and a base for cyber warfare is under construction on a Venezuelan island.

Diosdado Cabello said the arrival of the planes was approved and authorized by Maduro. Russian Foreign Affairs spokeswoman Maria Zakharova also confirmed the presence of military personnel in Venezuela, stating that the countries had a bilateral agreement on military cooperation signed by Presidents Putin and Chávez in May 2001. Seredin said Russian investments in Venezuelan mining, agriculture and transportation are also contemplated.

Vladimir Zaemsky, Russia's ambassador to Venezuela said that the Russian military is helping their Venezuelan counterparts to defend themselves in the face of the "threat of the use of force" by the United States. Ambassador Zaemsky also said that the Venezuelan military needs to make sure that the weapons they have are in a functioning state while maintaining combat readiness of their equipment and teaching them how best to use it.

National Assembly deputy Williams Dávila said the National Assembly would investigate the "penetration of foreign forces in Venezuela", since Venezuela's Constitution requires that the legislature authorize foreign military missions and the arrival of Russian military was a "violation of Venezuelan sovereignty". Guaidó declared that foreign soldiers have been "imported" because Maduro's government does not trust the Venezuelan Armed Forces. US Secretary of State Pompeo accused Russia of "reckless escalation" of the situation in Venezuela, and warned Russian Foreign Minister Sergey Lavrov that the US would "not stand idly by", but did not say what the US response to Russian troops in Venezuela would be. Lavrov responded by accusing the Trump administration of organizing a coup in Venezuela. A United States Southern Command spokesperson said Russia's deployment of troops "directly undercuts the democratic aspirations of the Venezuelan people"; the OAS called it "a harmful act to Venezuelan sovereignty". In late March, US National Security Advisor Bolton said the US considered Russia's involvement a "direct threat to international peace and security in the region".

In April 2019, Malta refused to allow Russian planes to use its airspace to supply Maduro's government. Morgan Ortagus, spokeswoman of the United States State Department, applauded the decision; weeks earlier, the US raised concerns when Russian planes from Syria crossed Malta's airspace to transport soldiers and matériel to Venezuela. Russia described Malta's actions as "unfriendly" and warns that it will take this into account in bilateral relations between the two countries.

According to Agence France-Presse, Sergey Lavrov the foreign minister of Russia said to American foreign minister that: we condemn obvious interference of America in Venezuela; he also emphasized that the future of this country should be determined based on its people decision. Mutually, the United States says that Russian action(s) in Caracas is unprofitable, and severely criticized for sending Russian troops to Venezuela.

An article of The Wall Street Journal reported that Russia state defense contractor reduced Rostec staff in Venezuela in June due to "the acceptance that Mr. Maduro's regime no longer has the cash to continue to pay for other Rostec services associated with past contracts". According to undisclosed sources, the number of Russian operatives would have been reduced to "just a few dozen from about 1,000 at the height of cooperation between Moscow and Caracas several years ago". Donald Trump announced in Twitter: "Russia has informed us that they have removed most of their people from Venezuela". Rostec reported that the numbers published by the newspaper were exaggerated and Russian spokesman Dmitry Peskov, expressed to the press that he had not been in touch with Trump: "it's a circumstantial reference to newspaper sources of information, because there was no official message about this from the Russian side". According to news agency RIA, Russia foreign ministry expressed some days later that their country was ready to send more military specialist if needed, another Russian press, TASS, quoted the ministry saying that Russia did not rule out increasing the number of military in Venezuela.

On 26 June, Russia announced the withdrawal of its military technicians, operating in Venezuela since March. According to the Russian embassy in Caracas, "Russia delivered to Venezuela high-level equipment that requires regular maintenance. Furthermore, Russian specialists provided technical training to Venezuelan staff. Unlike reported, it was not a Russian military presence but the fulfillment of maintenance contracts".

In September, two Russian planes said to be carrying technical specialists arrived in Venezuela.

On 10 December, a group of around forty Russian soldiers arrived to Canaima, Bolívar, on a Shaanxi Y-8 plane landing on the runway that serves as the entry to the National Park. Locals assured that the soldiers wore uniforms of the Venezuelan Armed Forces and that they carried crates with microwave equipment, satellite antennas, signal inhibitors, and other devices.

=== 2020 ===
Russia welcomed Luis Parra's appointment during the 2020 Venezuelan National Assembly Delegated Committee election. The Russian Foreign Ministry said that the appointment contributes to the return of the intra-Venezuelan political struggle to the constitutional field that will find a peaceful exit to the ongoing crisis. Opposition deputies denounced that Russia looked after supporting Parra to improve its businesses in Venezuela, including to increase the Russian shareholder participation in oil contracts and other mining concessions that need the approval of the National Assembly and that it would not have with Guaidó.

Venezuelan media reported on 7 May, after the Macuto Bay raid, that Russian Special Operations Forces were assisting Maduro with surveillance from unmanned aerial vehicles.

== Sanctions ==
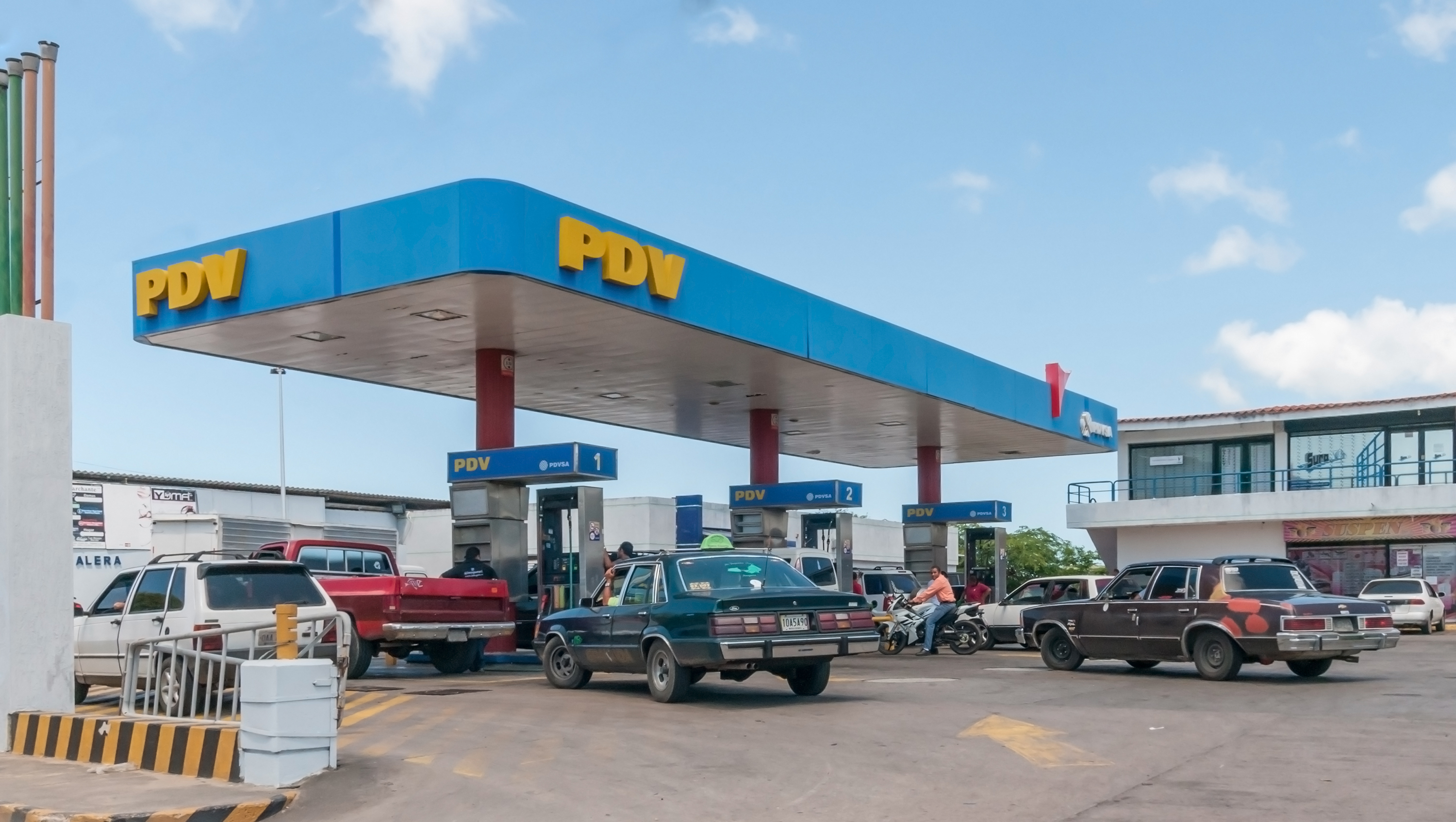
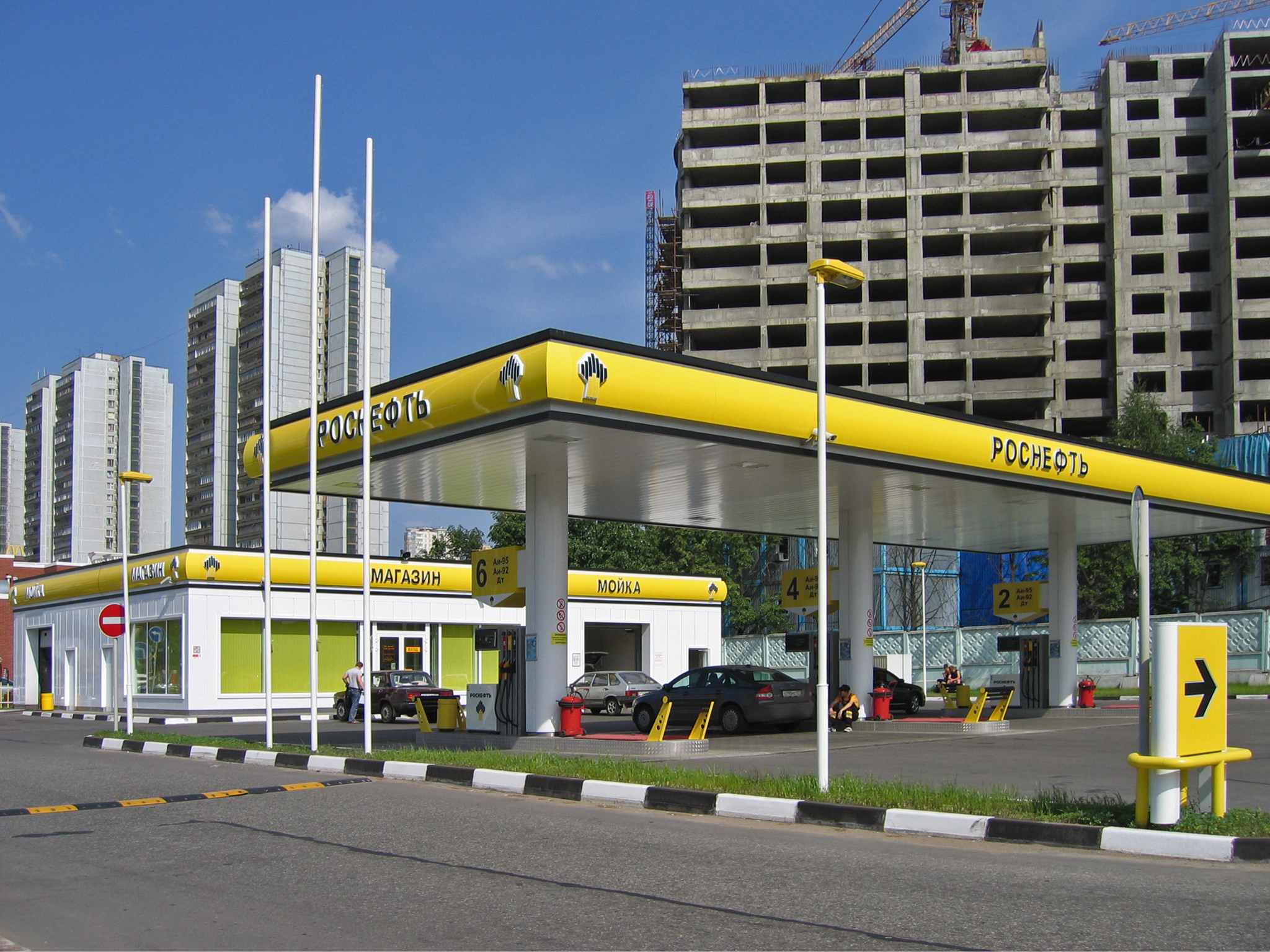
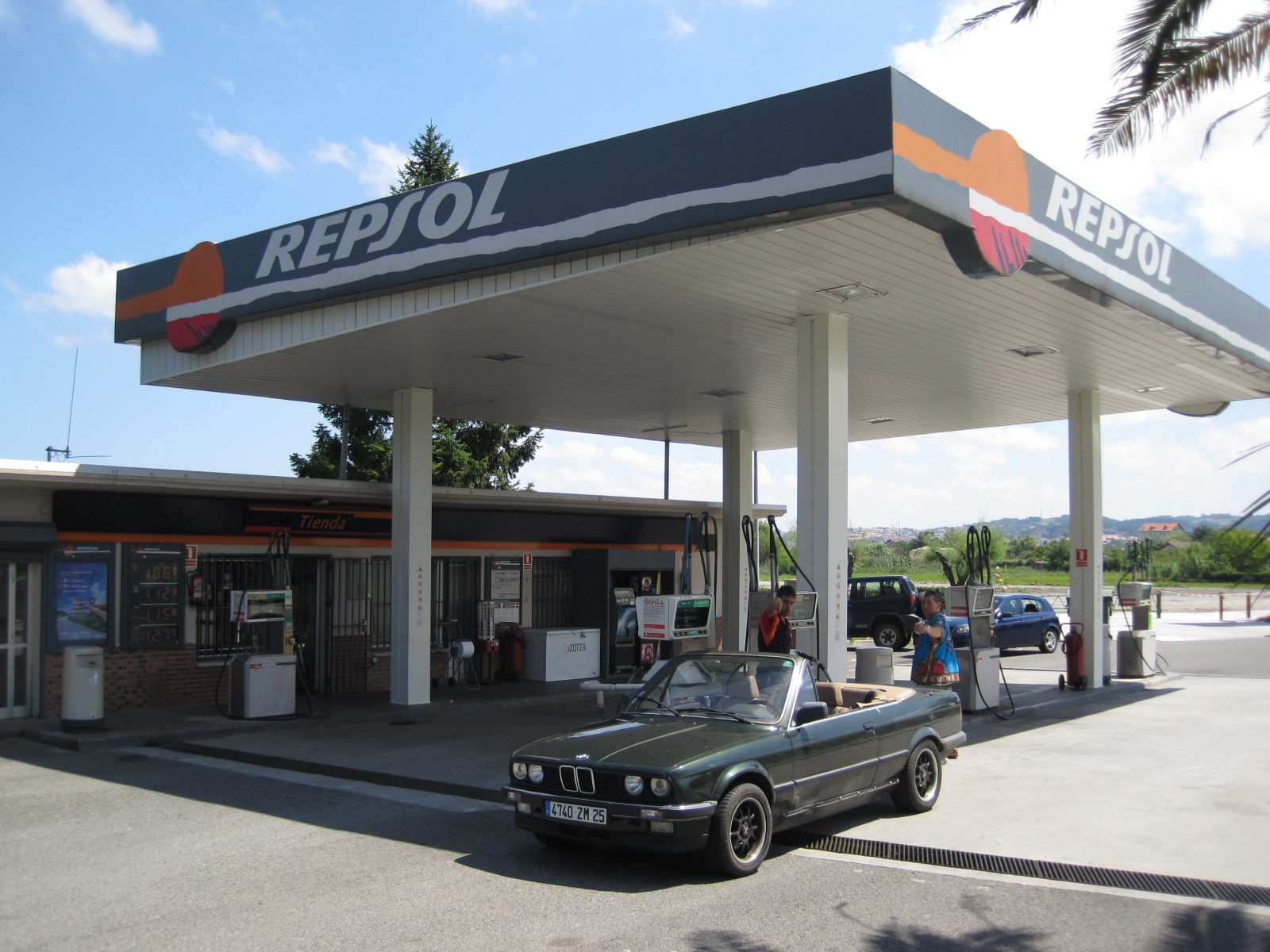
Filling stations
Top: Venezuela's PDVSA; bottom: Russia's Rosneft, Spain's Repsol

During the crisis in Venezuela, the United States, the European Union, Canada, Mexico, Panama and Switzerland have applied individual sanctions against people associated with Maduro's administration, including government officials, members of the military and security forces, and private individuals alleged to be involved in human rights abuses, corruption, degradation in the rule of law and repression of democracy. Public Radio International (PRI) said the sanctions targeted Maduro and Chavismo "elites", while "they've done little to make an impact on ordinary Venezuelans, whose lives have spiraled into a humanitarian crisis as hyperinflation has driven nearly 3 million to flee." As of 27 March 2018, the Washington Office on Latin America said 78 Venezuelans associated with Maduro had been sanctioned by several countries.

In 2018, Trump signed an order that prohibits people in the U.S. from making any type of transaction with digital currency emitted by or in the name of the government of Venezuela as of 9 January 2018. The executive order referenced "Petro", a crypto-currency also known as petromoneda.

As the humanitarian crisis deepened and expanded, the Trump administration levied more serious economic sanctions against Venezuela, and "Maduro accused the US of plunging Venezuelan citizens further into economic crisis." In January 2019, during the presidential crisis, the United States imposed sanctions on the Venezuelan state-owned oil and natural gas company PDVSA to pressure Maduro to resign. Reuters said the sanctions are expected to reduce Venezuela's ability to purchase food and other imports which could result in further shortages and worsen its economic position. PRI said that "sanctions against PDVSA are likely to yield stronger and more direct economic consequences". Companies including India's Reliance Industries Limited, Russia's Rosneft, Spain's Repsol, and commodity trading companies Trafigura and Vitol continue to supply Venezuela's oil industry as of 11 April 2019.

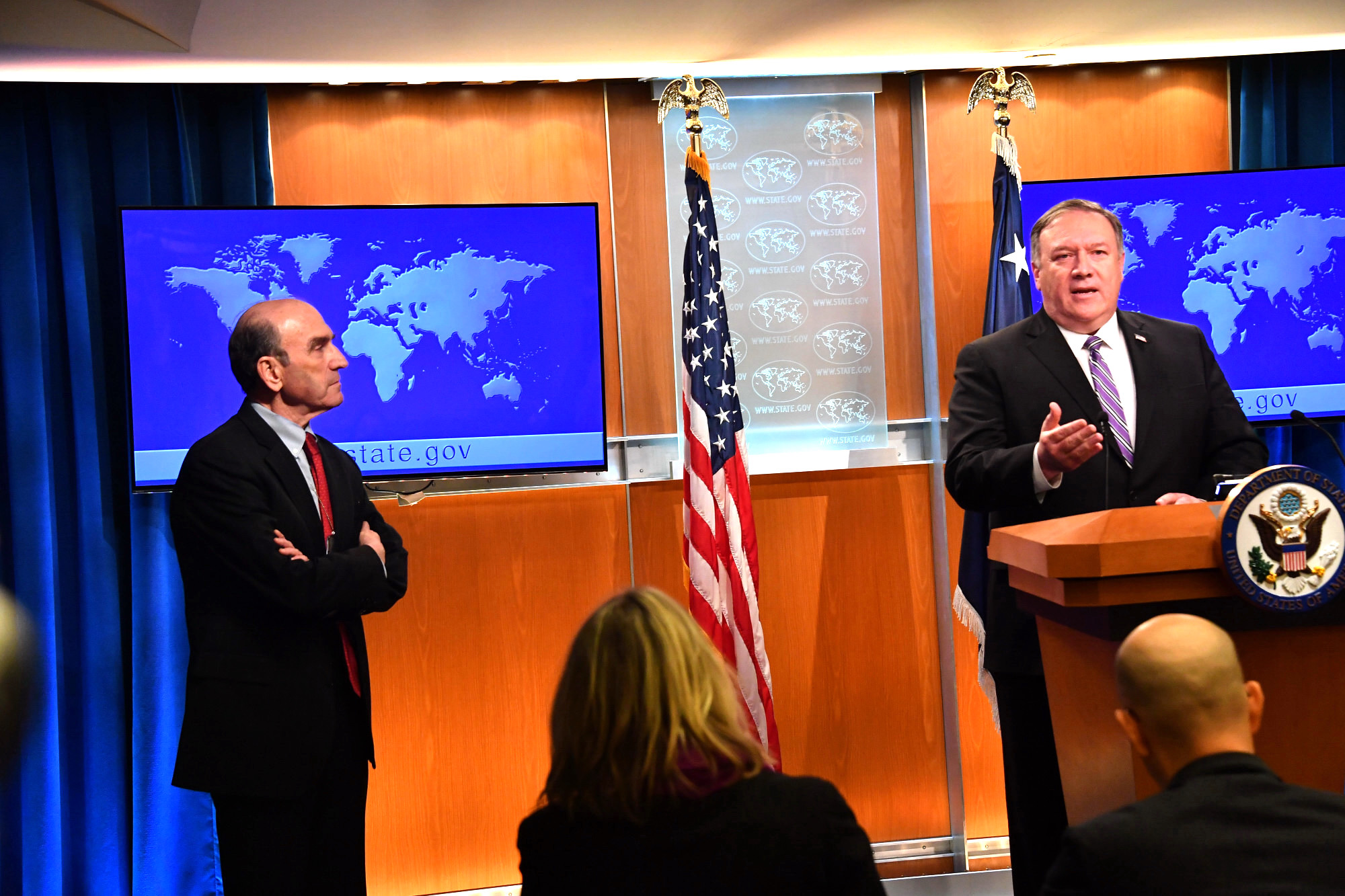
United States' Special Representative for Venezuela Elliott Abrams with Secretary of State Mike Pompeo in January 2019

The United States Department of the Treasury placed sanctions affecting Venezuela's gold industry in March 2019, explaining that Maduro's government "is pillaging the wealth of Venezuela while imperiling indigenous people by encroaching on protected areas and causing deforestation and habitat loss". After the detention of Guaidó's chief of staff, Roberto Marrero, in March 2019, the US also sanctioned the Venezuelan bank BANDES and its subsidiaries. The Maduro administration issued a statement saying that it "energetically rejects the unilateral, coercive, arbitrary and illegal measures" that would affect banking for millions of people.

Venezuela accused Canada of supporting Trump's 'war adventure' after Canada imposed new sanctions on 43 members of the Maduro government in April, including foreign minister Jorge Arreaza. The foreign ministry of Venezuela said that Canada's Prime Minister, Justin Trudeau, "has invalidated Canada as a reliable actor in dialogue", and had "declared their intention to destroy the Venezuelan economy to inflict suffering on the people".

In a speech on 17 April 2019 in Miami on the anniversary of the failed 1961 Bay of Pigs Invasion, Bolton announced new restrictions on U.S. dealings with the three countries he calls the troika of tyranny—Cuba, Nicaragua and Venezuela—as "part of a broader set of policies" aimed at "reversing the Obama administration's embrace" of Cuba. Maduro said the sanctions were "totally illegal" and that "Central banks around the world are sacred, all countries respect them. ... To me the empire looks crazy, desperate."

== See also ==
- Crisis in Venezuela
- Responses to the Venezuelan presidential crisis
