= Dianium =

Misidentified chemical element

Dianium was the proposed name for a new element found by the mineralogist and poet Wolfgang Franz von Kobell in 1860. The name derived from the Roman goddess Diana. During the analysis of the mineral tantalite and niobite, he concluded that it does contain an element similar to niobium and tantalum. The symbol was Di.

Following the rediscovery of niobium in 1846 by the German chemist Heinrich Rose, Friedrich Wöhler, Heinrich Rose, R. Hermann and Kobell analysed the minerals tantalite and columbite to better understand the chemistry of niobium and tantalum. The similar reactivity of niobium and tantalum hindered preparation of pure samples and therefore several new elements were proposed, which were later found to be mixtures of niobium and tantalum. Rose discovered pelopium in 1846, while Hermann announced the discovery of ilmenium in 1847. In 1860, Kobell published the results on the tantalite from a quarry near Kimito a village in Finland and columbite from Bodenmais a village in Germany. He concluded that the element he found was different from tantalum, niobium, pelopium and ilmenium.

The differences between tantalum and niobium and the fact that no other similar element was present were unequivocally demonstrated in 1864 by Christian Wilhelm Blomstrand, and Henri Etienne Sainte-Claire Deville, as well as by Louis J. Troost, who determined the formulas of some of the compounds in 1865 and finally by the Swiss chemist Jean Charles Galissard de Marignac.

Both tantalum and niobium react with chlorine and traces of oxygen, including atmospheric concentrations, with niobium forming two compounds: the white volatile niobium pentachloride (NbCl_{5}) and the non-volatile niobium oxychloride (NbOCl_{3}). The claimed new elements pelopium, ilmenium and dianium were in fact identical to niobium or mixtures of niobium and tantalum.
