= Pelopium =

Proposed chemical element based on misidentified specimens

Pelopium was the proposed name for a new element found by the chemist Heinrich Rose in 1845. The name derived from the Greek king and later god Pelops, son of Tantalus. During the analysis of the mineral tantalite, he concluded that it does contain an element similar to niobium and tantalum. The similar reactivity of niobium and tantalum complicated preparation of pure samples and therefore several new elements were proposed, which were later found to be mixtures of niobium and tantalum.

The differences between tantalum and niobium and the fact that no other similar element was present were unequivocally demonstrated in 1864 by Christian Wilhelm Blomstrand, and Henri Etienne Sainte-Claire Deville, as well as Louis J. Troost, who determined the formulas of some of the compounds in 1865 and finally by the Swiss chemist Jean Charles Galissard de Marignac.

This confusion arose from the minimal observed differences between tantalum and niobium. Both tantalum and niobium react with chlorine and traces of oxygen, including atmospheric concentrations, with niobium forming two compounds: the white volatile niobium pentachloride (NbCl_{5}) and the non-volatile niobium oxychloride (NbOCl_{3}). The claimed new elements pelopium, ilmenium and dianium were in fact identical to niobium or mixtures of niobium and tantalum.
