= Ilmenium =

Proposed chemical element name

Ilmenium was the proposed name for a new element found by the chemist R. Hermann in 1847. During the analysis of the mineral samarskite, he concluded that it does contain an element similar to niobium and tantalum. The similar reactivity of niobium and tantalum complicated preparation of pure samples of the metals and therefore several new elements were proposed, which were later found to be mixtures of niobium and tantalum.

The differences between tantalum and niobium, and the fact that no other similar element was present, were unequivocally demonstrated in 1864 by Christian Wilhelm Blomstrand, and Henri Etienne Sainte-Claire Deville, as well as Louis J. Troost, who determined the formulas of some of the compounds in 1865 and finally by the Swiss chemist Jean Charles Galissard de Marignac Although it had been proven that ilmenium is only a mixture of niobium and tantalum, Hermann continued publishing articles on ilmenium for several years.

The name "ilmenium" is a reference to the Ilmensky Mountains.
