= Ditte =

Ditte may refer to:

== First names ==
- Ditte Ejlerskov (born 1982), Danish contemporary artist
- Ditte Gråbøl (born 1959), Danish actress
- Ditte Jensen (born 1980), Danish freestyle swimmer
- Ditte Kotzian (born 1979), German diver
- Ditte Larsen (born 1983), Danish footballer
- Ditte Søby Hansen (born 1997), Danish badminton player

== Other uses ==
- Ditte, Child of Man a 1946 Danish feature film adaptation of a novel by Martin Andersen Nexø
- 3535 Ditte, a main-belt asteroid, named after the protagonist of Ditte, Child of Man
- Mount Ditte, named after French chemist Alfred Ditte, located on the Adelaide Island off the west coast of the Antarctic Peninsula

== See also ==
- Friedrich Dittes (1829–1896) a German-Austrian educator
- Steffen Dittes (born 1973), German politician
