= Niobium =

Niobium, _{41}Nb
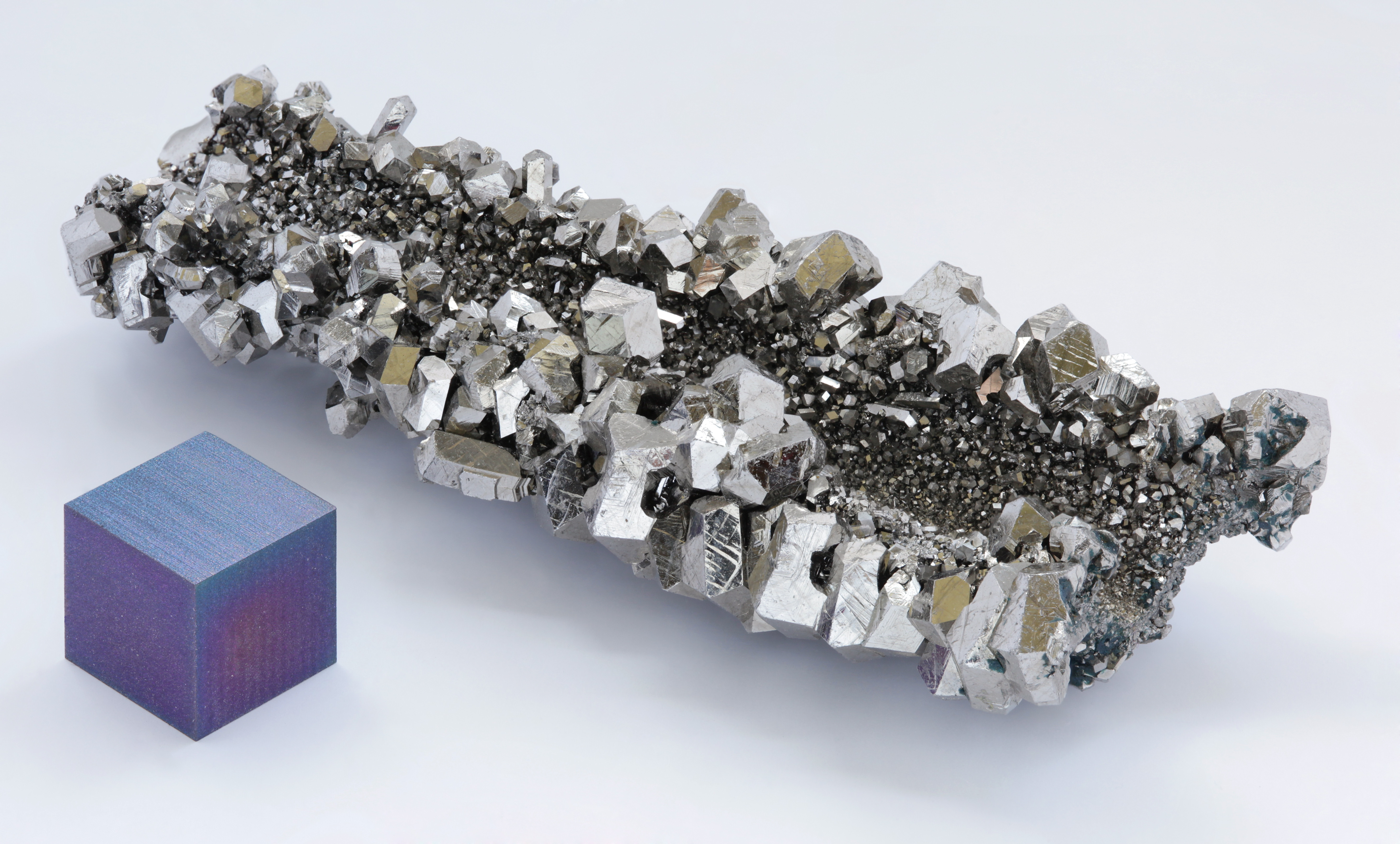

Niobium
- Pronunciation: /naɪˈoʊbiəm/ (ny-OH-bee-əm)
- Appearance: Gray metallic, bluish when oxidized

Standard atomic weight A_{r}°(Nb)
- 92.90637±0.00001; 92.906±0.001 (abridged)

Niobium in the periodic table
Hydrogen																															Helium
Lithium	Beryllium																									Boron	Carbon	Nitrogen	Oxygen	Fluorine	Neon
Sodium	Magnesium																									Aluminium	Silicon	Phosphorus	Sulfur	Chlorine	Argon
Potassium	Calcium															Scandium	Titanium	Vanadium	Chromium	Manganese	Iron	Cobalt	Nickel	Copper	Zinc	Gallium	Germanium	Arsenic	Selenium	Bromine	Krypton
Rubidium	Strontium															Yttrium	Zirconium	Niobium	Molybdenum	Technetium	Ruthenium	Rhodium	Palladium	Silver	Cadmium	Indium	Tin	Antimony	Tellurium	Iodine	Xenon
Caesium	Barium	Lanthanum	Cerium	Praseodymium	Neodymium	Promethium	Samarium	Europium	Gadolinium	Terbium	Dysprosium	Holmium	Erbium	Thulium	Ytterbium	Lutetium	Hafnium	Tantalum	Tungsten	Rhenium	Osmium	Iridium	Platinum	Gold	Mercury (element)	Thallium	Lead	Bismuth	Polonium	Astatine	Radon
Francium	Radium	Actinium	Thorium	Protactinium	Uranium	Neptunium	Plutonium	Americium	Curium	Berkelium	Californium	Einsteinium	Fermium	Mendelevium	Nobelium	Lawrencium	Rutherfordium	Dubnium	Seaborgium	Bohrium	Hassium	Meitnerium	Darmstadtium	Roentgenium	Copernicium	Nihonium	Flerovium	Moscovium	Livermorium	Tennessine	Oganesson
V
↑
Nb
↓
Ta
zirconium ← niobium → molybdenum
- Atomic number (Z): 41
- Group: group 5
- Period: period 5
- Block: d-block
- Electron configuration: [Kr] 4d^{4} 5s^{1}
- Electrons per shell: 2, 8, 18, 12, 1

Physical properties
- Phase at STP: solid
- Melting point: 2750 K (2477 °C, 4491 °F)
- Boiling point: 5017 K (4744 °C, 8571 °F)
- Density (at 20° C): 8.582 g/cm^{3}
- Heat of fusion: 30 kJ/mol
- Heat of vaporization: 689.9 kJ/mol
- Molar heat capacity: 24.60 J/(mol·K)
- Specific heat capacity: 264.784 J/(kg·K)
Vapor pressure
P (Pa)	1	10	100	1 k	10 k	100 k
at T (K)	2942	3207	3524	3910	4393	5013

Atomic properties
- Oxidation states: common: +5 −3, −1, 0, +1, +2, +3, +4
- Electronegativity: Pauling scale: 1.6
- Ionization energies: 1st: 652.1 kJ/mol; 2nd: 1380 kJ/mol; 3rd: 2416 kJ/mol
- Atomic radius: empirical: 146 pm
- Covalent radius: 164±6 pm
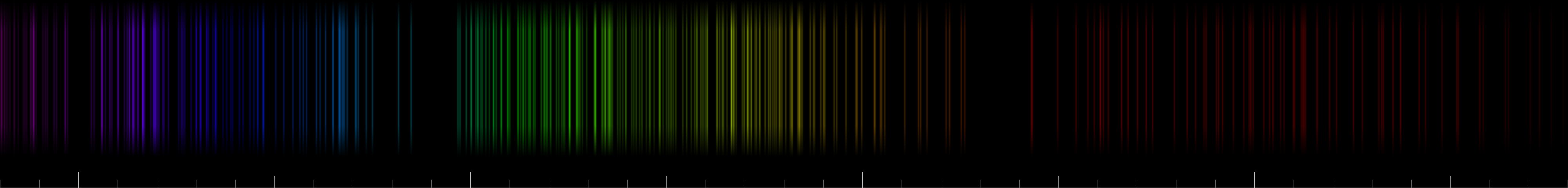
- Spectral lines of niobium

Other properties
- Natural occurrence: primordial
- Crystal structure: body-centered cubic (bcc) (cI2)
- Lattice constant: a = 330.05 pm (at 20 °C)
- Thermal expansion: 7.07×10^{−6}/K (at 20 °C)
- Thermal conductivity: 53.7 W/(m⋅K)
- Electrical resistivity: 152 nΩ⋅m (at 0 °C)
- Magnetic ordering: paramagnetic
- Young's modulus: 105 GPa
- Shear modulus: 38 GPa
- Bulk modulus: 170 GPa
- Speed of sound thin rod: 3480 m/s (at 20 °C)
- Poisson ratio: 0.40
- Mohs hardness: 6.0
- Vickers hardness: 870–1320 MPa
- Brinell hardness: 735–2450 MPa
- CAS Number: 7440-03-1

History
- Naming: after Niobe in Greek mythology, daughter of Tantalus (tantalum)
- Discovery: Charles Hatchett (1801)
- First isolation: Christian Wilhelm Blomstrand (1864)
- Recognized as a distinct element by: Heinrich Rose (1844)

Isotopes of niobium
Main isotopes			Decay	
Isotope	abundance	half-life (t_{1/2})	mode	product
^{91}Nb	synth	680 y	β^{+}	^{91}Zr
^{91m}Nb	synth	60.86 d	IT	^{91}Nb
^{91m}Nb	synth	60.86 d	β^{+}	^{91}Zr
^{92}Nb	(unstable)	3.47×10^{7} y	β^{+}	^{92}Zr
^{93}Nb	100%	stable		
^{93m}Nb	synth	16.1 y	IT	^{93}Nb
^{94}Nb	(unstable)	2.04×10^{4} y	β^{−}	^{94}Mo
^{95}Nb	synth	34.991 d	β^{−}	^{95}Mo

Niobium is a chemical element; it has symbol Nb (formerly columbium, Cb) and atomic number 41. It is a light grey, crystalline transition metal. Pure niobium has a Mohs hardness rating similar to pure titanium, and it has similar ductility to iron. Niobium oxidizes in Earth's atmosphere very slowly, hence its application in jewelry as a hypoallergenic alternative to nickel. Niobium is found in the minerals pyrochlore and columbite, as well as other minerals. Its name comes from Greek mythology: Niobe, daughter of Tantalus, the namesake of tantalum. The name reflects the great similarity between the two elements in their physical and chemical properties, which makes them difficult to distinguish.

English chemist Charles Hatchett reported a new element similar to tantalum in 1801 and named it columbium. In 1809, English chemist William Hyde Wollaston wrongly concluded that tantalum and columbium were identical. German chemist Heinrich Rose determined in 1846 that tantalum ores contain a second element, which he named niobium. In 1864 and 1865, a series of scientific findings clarified that niobium and columbium were the same element (as distinguished from tantalum), and for a century both names were used interchangeably. Niobium was officially adopted as the name of the element in 1949, but the name columbium remains in use in metallurgy in the United States.

It was not until the early 20th century that niobium was first used commercially. Niobium is an important addition to high-strength low-alloy steels. Brazil is the leading producer of niobium and ferroniobium, an alloy of 60–70% niobium with iron. Niobium is used mostly in alloys, the largest part in special steel such as that used in gas pipelines. Although these alloys contain a maximum of 0.1%, the small percentage of niobium enhances the strength of the steel by scavenging carbide and nitride. The temperature stability of niobium-containing superalloys is important for its use in jet and rocket engines.

Niobium is used in various superconducting materials. These alloys, also containing titanium and tin, are widely used in the superconducting magnets of MRI scanners. Other applications of niobium include welding, nuclear industries, electronics, optics, and jewelry. In the last application, the low toxicity and iridescence produced by anodization are highly desired properties.

== History ==
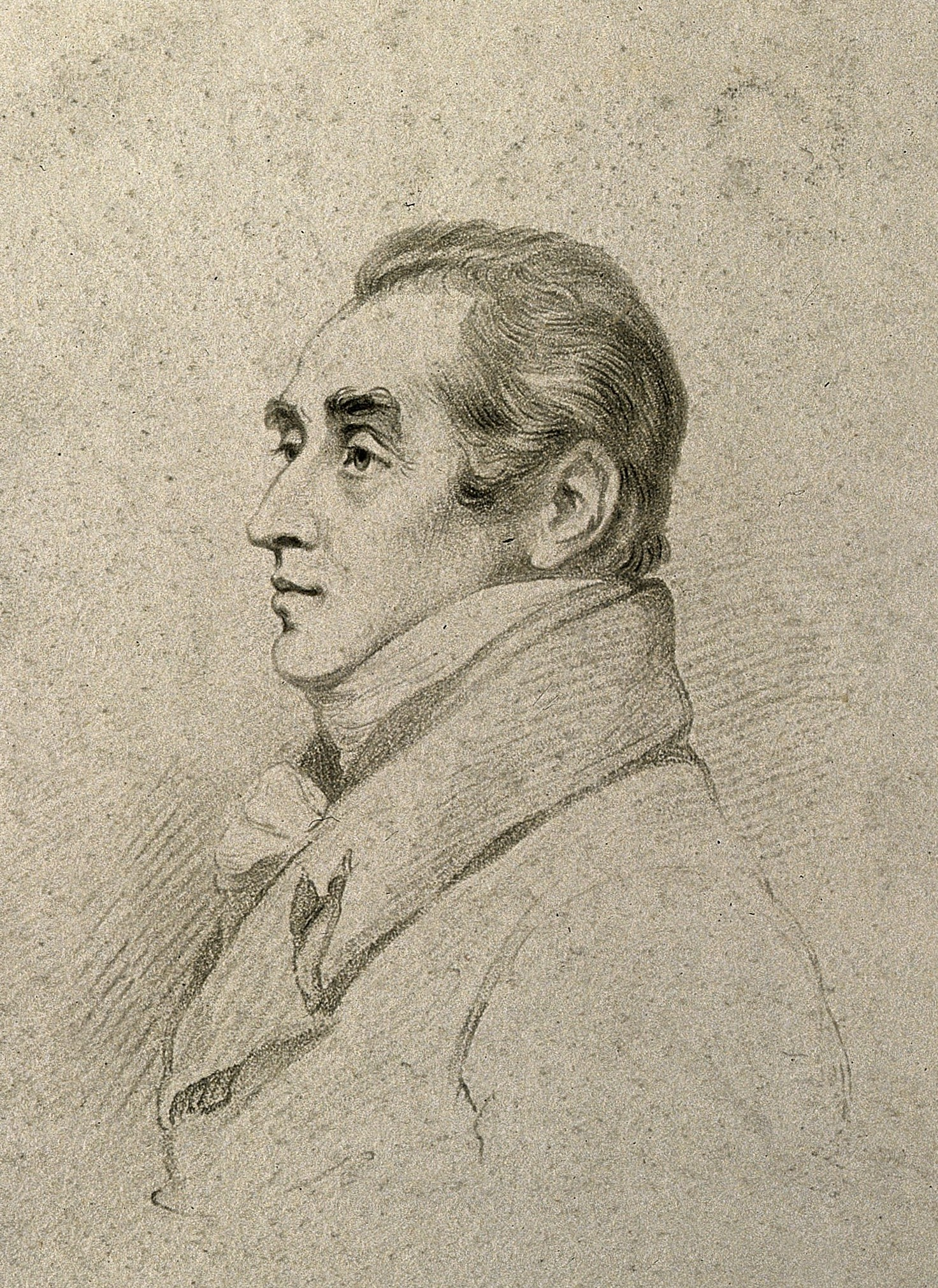
English chemist Charles Hatchett identified the element columbium in 1801 within a mineral discovered in Connecticut, US.

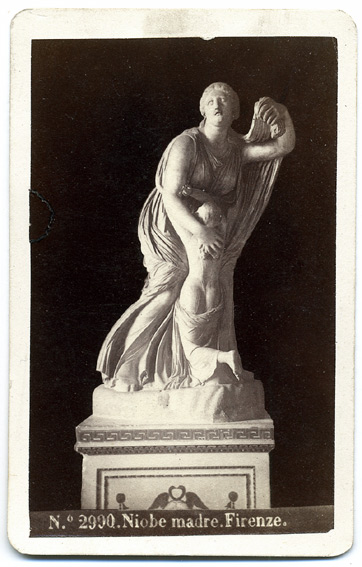
Picture of a Hellenistic sculpture representing Niobe by Giorgio Sommer

Niobium is not formed by stellar fusion but rather by the exotic conditions leading to the birth of white dwarfs, which accounts for their relative scarcity in the cosmos. They are a signature of second generation planets.

Niobium was identified by English chemist Charles Hatchett in 1801. He found a new element in a mineral sample that had been sent to England from Connecticut, United States in 1734 by John Winthrop (grandson of John Winthrop the Younger) and named the mineral "columbite" and the new element "columbium" after Columbia, the poetic name for the United States. The columbium discovered by Hatchett was probably a mixture of the new element with tantalum.

Subsequently, there was considerable confusion over the difference between columbium (niobium) and the closely related tantalum. In 1809, English chemist William Hyde Wollaston compared the oxides derived from both columbium—columbite, with a density 5.918 g/cm^{3}, and tantalum—tantalite, with a density over 8 g/cm^{3}, and concluded that the two oxides, despite the significant difference in density, were identical; thus he kept the name tantalum. This conclusion was disputed in 1846 by German chemist Heinrich Rose, who argued that there were two different elements in the tantalite sample, and named them after children of Tantalus: niobium (from Niobe) and pelopium (from Pelops). This confusion arose from the minimal observed differences between tantalum and niobium. The claimed new elements pelopium, ilmenium, and dianium were in fact identical to niobium or mixtures of niobium and tantalum.

The differences between tantalum and niobium were unequivocally demonstrated in 1864 by Christian Wilhelm Blomstrand and Henri Étienne Sainte-Claire Deville, as well as Louis J. Troost, who determined the formulas of some of the compounds in 1865 and finally by Swiss chemist Jean Charles Galissard de Marignac in 1866, who all proved that there were only two elements. Articles on ilmenium continued to appear until 1871.

Christian Wilhelm Blomstrand was the first to prepare the metal in 1866, when he reduced niobium chloride by heating it in an atmosphere of hydrogen. Although de Marignac was able to produce tantalum-free niobium on a larger scale by 1866, it was not until the early 20th century that niobium was used in incandescent lamp filaments, the first commercial application. This use quickly became obsolete through the replacement of niobium with tungsten, which has a higher melting point. That niobium improves the strength of steel was first discovered in the 1920s, and this application remains its predominant use. In 1961, the American physicist Eugene Kunzler and coworkers at Bell Labs discovered that niobium–tin continues to exhibit superconductivity in the presence of strong electric currents and magnetic fields, making it the first material to support the high currents and fields necessary for useful high-power magnets and electrical power machinery. This discovery enabled—two decades later—the production of long multi-strand cables wound into coils to create large, powerful electromagnets for rotating machinery, particle accelerators, and particle detectors.

=== Naming the element ===
Columbium (symbol Cb) was the name originally given by Hatchett upon his discovery of the metal in 1801. The name reflected that the type specimen of the ore came from the United States of America (Columbia). This name remained in use in American journals—the last paper published by American Chemical Society with columbium in its title dates from 1953—while niobium was used in Europe. To end this confusion, the name niobium was chosen for element 41 at the 15th Conference of the Union of Chemistry in Amsterdam in 1949. A year later this name was officially adopted by the International Union of Pure and Applied Chemistry (IUPAC) after 100 years of controversy, despite the chronological precedence of the name columbium. This was a compromise of sorts; the IUPAC accepted tungsten instead of wolfram in deference to North American usage; and niobium instead of columbium in deference to European usage. While many US chemical societies and government organizations typically use the official IUPAC name, some metallurgists and metal societies still use the original American name, columbium.

== Characteristics ==
=== Physical ===
Niobium is a lustrous, grey, ductile, paramagnetic metal in group 5 of the periodic table (see table), with an electron configuration in the outermost shells atypical for group 5. Similarly atypical configurations occur in the neighborhood of ruthenium (44) and rhodium (45).

Z	Element	No. of electrons/shell
23	vanadium	2, 8, 11, 2
41	niobium	2, 8, 18, 12, 1
73	tantalum	2, 8, 18, 32, 11, 2
105	dubnium	2, 8, 18, 32, 32, 11, 2

Although it is thought to have a body-centered cubic crystal structure from absolute zero to its melting point, high-resolution measurements of the thermal expansion along the three crystallographic axes reveal anisotropies which are inconsistent with a cubic structure. Therefore, further research and discovery in this area is expected.

Niobium becomes a superconductor at cryogenic temperatures. At atmospheric pressure, it has the highest critical temperature of the elemental superconductors at 9.2 K (−263.95 °C; −443.11 °F). Niobium has the greatest magnetic penetration depth of any element. In addition, it is one of the three elemental type II superconductors, along with vanadium and technetium. The superconductive properties are strongly dependent on the purity of the niobium metal.

When very pure, it is comparatively soft and ductile, but impurities make it harder.

The metal has a low neutron capture cross-section for thermal neutrons, so it is used in nuclear industries where neutron-transparent structures are desired.

=== Chemical ===
The metal takes on a bluish tinge when exposed to air at room temperature for extended periods. Despite a high melting point in elemental form (2,468 °C (4,474 °F)), it is less dense than other refractory metals. Furthermore, it is corrosion-resistant, exhibits superconductive properties, and forms dielectric oxide layers.

Niobium is slightly less electropositive and more compact than its predecessor in the periodic table, zirconium, whereas it is virtually identical in size to the heavier tantalum atoms, as a result of the lanthanide contraction. As a result, niobium's chemical properties are very similar to those for tantalum, which appears directly below niobium in the periodic table. Although its corrosion resistance is not as outstanding as that of tantalum, the lower price and greater availability make niobium attractive for less demanding applications, such as vat linings in chemical plants.

=== Isotopes ===
Almost all of the niobium in Earth's crust is ^{93}Nb. The most stable radioisotope is ^{92}Nb, which decays into ^{92}Zr with half-life 34.7 million years. ^{92}Nb, along with the next most stable one, ^{94}Nb (20,400 years), has been detected in refined samples of terrestrial niobium and may originate from bombardment by cosmic ray muons in Earth's crust. Isotopes lighter than the stable ^{93}Nb tend to β^{+} decay, and those that are heavier tend to β^{−} decay, with β^{+}-delayed proton emission observed for isotopes as heavy as ^{84}Nb.

=== Occurrence ===
Niobium is estimated to be the 33rd most abundant element in the Earth's crust, at 20 ppm. Some believe that the abundance on Earth is much greater, and that the element's high density has concentrated it in Earth's core. The free element is not found in nature, but niobium occurs in combination with other elements in minerals. Minerals that contain niobium often also contain tantalum. Examples include ferrocolumbite ((Fe,Mn)Nb_{2}O_{6}) and coltan ((Fe,Mn)(Ta,Nb)_{2}O_{6}). Columbite–tantalite minerals (the most common species being columbite-(Fe) and tantalite-(Fe)) that are most usually found as accessory minerals in pegmatite intrusions, and in alkaline intrusive rocks. Less common are the niobates of calcium, uranium, thorium and the rare earth elements. Examples of such niobates are pyrochlores ((Na,Ca)_{2}Nb_{2}O_{6}(OH,F)) and euxenite ((Y,Ca,Ce,U,Th)(Nb,Ta,Ti)_{2}O_{6}). These large deposits of niobium have been found associated with carbonatites (carbonate-silicate igneous rocks) and as a constituent of pyrochlore.

The three largest mined deposits of pyrochlore, two in Brazil and one in Canada, were found in the 1950s, and are still the major producers of niobium mineral concentrates. The largest deposit is hosted within a carbonatite intrusion in Araxá, state of Minas Gerais, Brazil, owned by CBMM (Companhia Brasileira de Metalurgia e Mineração); the other active Brazilian deposit is located near Catalão, state of Goiás, and owned by China Molybdenum, also hosted within a carbonatite intrusion. Together, those two mines produce about 88% of the world's supply. Brazil also has a large but still unexploited deposit near São Gabriel da Cachoeira, state of Amazonas, as well as a few smaller deposits, notably in the state of Roraima.

The third largest producer of niobium is the carbonatite-hosted Niobec mine, in Saint-Honoré, Quebec, Canada, owned by Magris Resources. It produces between 7% and 10% of the world's supply.

== Production ==
Niobium production

After the separation from the other minerals, the mixed oxides of tantalum (Ta_{2}O_{5}) and niobium (Nb_{2}O_{5}) are obtained. The first step in the processing is the reaction of the oxides with hydrofluoric acid:

Ta_{2}O_{5} + 14 HF → 2 H_{2}TaF_{7} + 5 H_{2}O
Nb_{2}O_{5} + 10 HF → 2 H_{2}NbOF_{5} + 3 H_{2}O

The first industrial scale separation, developed by Swiss chemist Jean Charles Galissard de Marignac, exploits the differing solubilities of the complex niobium and tantalum fluorides, dipotassium oxypentafluoroniobate monohydrate (K_{2}NbOF_{5}·H_{2}O) and dipotassium heptafluorotantalate (K_{2}TaF_{7}) in water. Newer processes use the liquid extraction of the fluorides from aqueous solution by organic solvents like cyclohexanone. The complex niobium and tantalum fluorides are extracted separately from the organic solvent with water and either precipitated by the addition of potassium fluoride to produce a potassium fluoride complex, or precipitated with ammonia as the pentoxide:

H_{2}NbOF_{5}(aq) + 2 KF(aq) → K_{2}NbOF_{5}(s) + 2 HF(aq)

Followed by:

2 H_{2}NbOF_{5}(aq) + 10 NH_{4}OH(aq) → Nb_{2}O_{5}(s) + 10 NH_{4}F(aq) + 7 H_{2}O(l)

Several methods are used for the reduction to metallic niobium. The electrolysis of a molten mixture of K_{2}NbOF_{5} and sodium chloride is one; the other is the reduction of the fluoride with sodium. With this method, a relatively high purity niobium can be obtained. In large scale production, Nb_{2}O_{5} is reduced with hydrogen or carbon. In the aluminothermic reaction, a mixture of iron oxide and niobium oxide is reacted with aluminium:

3 Nb_{2}O_{5} + Fe_{2}O_{3} + 12 Al → 6 Nb + 2 Fe + 6 Al_{2}O_{3}

Small amounts of oxidizers like sodium nitrate are added to enhance the reaction. The result is aluminium oxide and ferroniobium, an alloy of iron and niobium used in steel production. Ferroniobium contains between 60 and 70% niobium. Without iron oxide, the aluminothermic process is used to produce niobium. Further purification is necessary to reach the grade for superconductive alloys. Electron beam melting under vacuum is the method used by the two major distributors of niobium.

As of 2013, CBMM from Brazil controlled 85 percent of the world's niobium production. The United States Geological Survey estimates that the production increased from 38,700 tonnes in 2005 to 44,500 tonnes in 2006. Worldwide resources are estimated to be 4.4 million tonnes. During the ten-year period between 1995 and 2005, the production more than doubled, starting from 17,800 tonnes in 1995. Between 2009 and 2011, production was stable at 63,000 tonnes per year, with a slight decrease in 2012 to only 50,000 tonnes per year.

Mine production (t) (USGS estimate)
	Brazil	Canada	Australia	Nigeria	Rwanda	Mozambique	Congo D.R.	World
2000	30000	2290	160	35	28	?	?	32600
2001	22000	3200	230	30	120	?	50	25600
2002	26000	3410	290	30	76	5	50	29900
2003	29000	3280	230	190	22	34	13	32800
2004	29900	3400	200	170	63	130	52	34000
2005	35000	3310	200	40	63	34	25	38700
2006	40000	4167	200	35	80	29	?	44500
2007	57300	3020	?	?	?	?	?	60400
2008	58000	4380	?	?	?	?	?	62900
2009	58000	4330	?	?	?	4	?	62900
2010	58000	4420	?	?	?	10	?	62900
2011	58000	4630	?	?	?	29	?	63000
2012	63000	5000	?	?	?	30	?	50100
2013	53100	5260	?	?	?	20	?	59400
2014	53000	5000	?	?	?	?	?	59000
2015	58000	5750	?	29	?	?	?	64300
2016	57000	6100	?	104	?	?	?	63900
2017	60700	6980	?	122	?	?	?	69100
2018	59000	7700	?	181	?	?	?	68200
2019	88900	6800	?	150	?	?	?	97000
2020	59800	6500	?	?	?	?	?	67700

Lesser amounts are found in Malawi's Kanyika Deposit (Kanyika mine).

== Compounds ==
In many ways, niobium is similar to tantalum and zirconium. It reacts with most nonmetals at high temperatures; with fluorine at room temperature; with chlorine at 150 °C (302 °F) and hydrogen at 200 °C (392 °F); and with nitrogen at 400 °C (752 °F), with products that are frequently interstitial and nonstoichiometric. The metal begins to oxidize in air at 200 °C (392 °F). It resists corrosion by acids, including aqua regia, hydrochloric, sulfuric, nitric and phosphoric acids. Niobium is attacked by hot concentrated sulfuric acid, hydrofluoric acid and hydrofluoric/nitric acid mixtures. It is also attacked by hot, saturated alkali metal hydroxide solutions.

Although niobium exhibits all of the formal oxidation states from +5 to −1 and −3, the most common compounds have niobium in the +5 state. Characteristically, compounds in oxidation states less than 5+ display Nb–Nb bonding. In aqueous solutions, niobium only exhibits the +5 oxidation state. It is also readily prone to hydrolysis and is barely soluble in dilute solutions of hydrochloric, sulfuric, nitric and phosphoric acids due to the precipitation of hydrous Nb oxide. Nb(V) is also slightly soluble in alkaline media due to the formation of soluble polyoxoniobate species.

=== Oxides, niobates and sulfides ===
Niobium forms oxides in the oxidation states +5 (Nb_{2}O_{5}), +4 (NbO_{2}), and the rarer oxidation state, +2 (NbO). Most common is the pentoxide, precursor to almost all niobium compounds and alloys. Niobates are generated by dissolving the pentoxide in basic hydroxide solutions or by melting it in alkali metal oxides. Examples are lithium niobate (LiNbO_{3}) and lanthanum niobate (LaNbO_{4}). Lithium niobate has a trigonally distorted perovskite-like structure, whereas the lanthanum niobate contains lone NbO_{4}^{3−} ions. The layered niobium sulfide (NbS_{2}) is also known.

Materials can be coated with a thin film of niobium(V) oxide chemical vapor deposition or atomic layer deposition processes, produced by the thermal decomposition of niobium(V) ethoxide above 350 °C (662 °F).

=== Halides ===
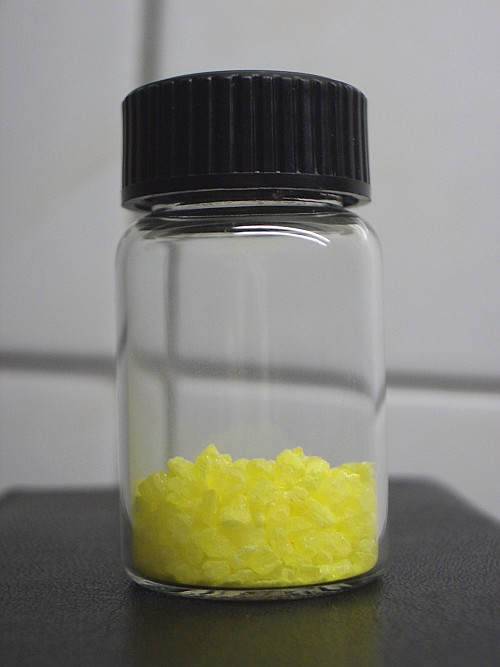
A very pure sample of niobium pentachloride

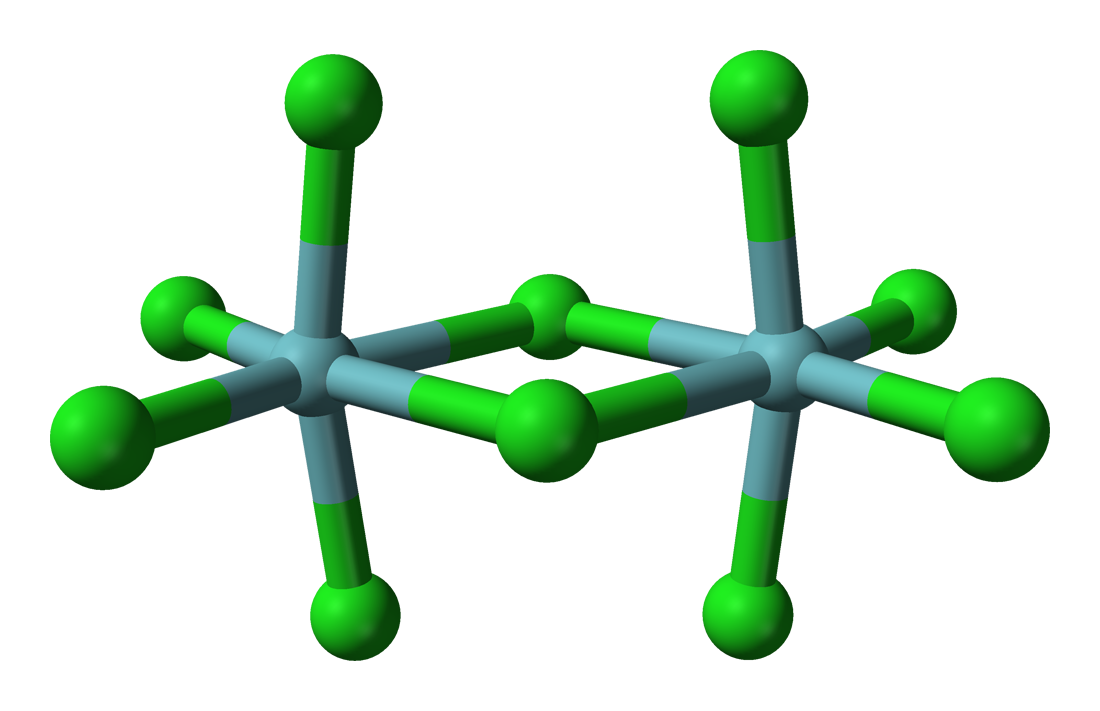
Ball-and-stick model of niobium pentachloride, which exists as a dimer

Niobium forms halides in the oxidation states of +5 and +4 as well as diverse substoichiometric compounds. The pentahalides (NbX_{5}) feature octahedral Nb centres. Niobium pentafluoride (NbF_{5}) is a white solid with a melting point of 79 °C (174 °F) and niobium pentachloride (NbCl_{5}) is yellow (see image at right) with a melting point of 203.4 °C (398.1 °F). Both are hydrolyzed to give oxides and oxyhalides, such as NbOCl_{3}. The pentachloride is a versatile reagent used to generate the organometallic compounds, such as niobocene dichloride ((C_{5}H_{5})_{2}NbCl_{2}). The tetrahalides (NbX_{4}) are dark-coloured polymers with Nb-Nb bonds; for example, the black niobium tetrafluoride (NbF_{4}) and dark violet niobium tetrachloride (NbCl_{4}).

Anionic halide compounds of niobium are well known, owing in part to the Lewis acidity of the pentahalides. The most important is NbF_{7}^{2−}, an intermediate in the separation of Nb and Ta from the ores. This heptafluoride tends to form the oxopentafluoride more readily than does the tantalum compound. Other halide complexes include octahedral NbCl_{6}^{−}:

Nb_{2}Cl_{10} + 2 Cl^{−} → 2 NbCl_{6}^{−}

As with other metals with low atomic numbers, a variety of reduced halide cluster ions is known, the prime example being Nb_{6}Cl_{18}^{4−}.

=== Nitrides and carbides ===
Other binary compounds of niobium include niobium nitride (NbN), which becomes a superconductor at low temperatures and is used in detectors for infrared light in the nanowire form. The main niobium carbide is NbC, an extremely hard, refractory, ceramic material, commercially used in cutting tool bits.

== Applications ==
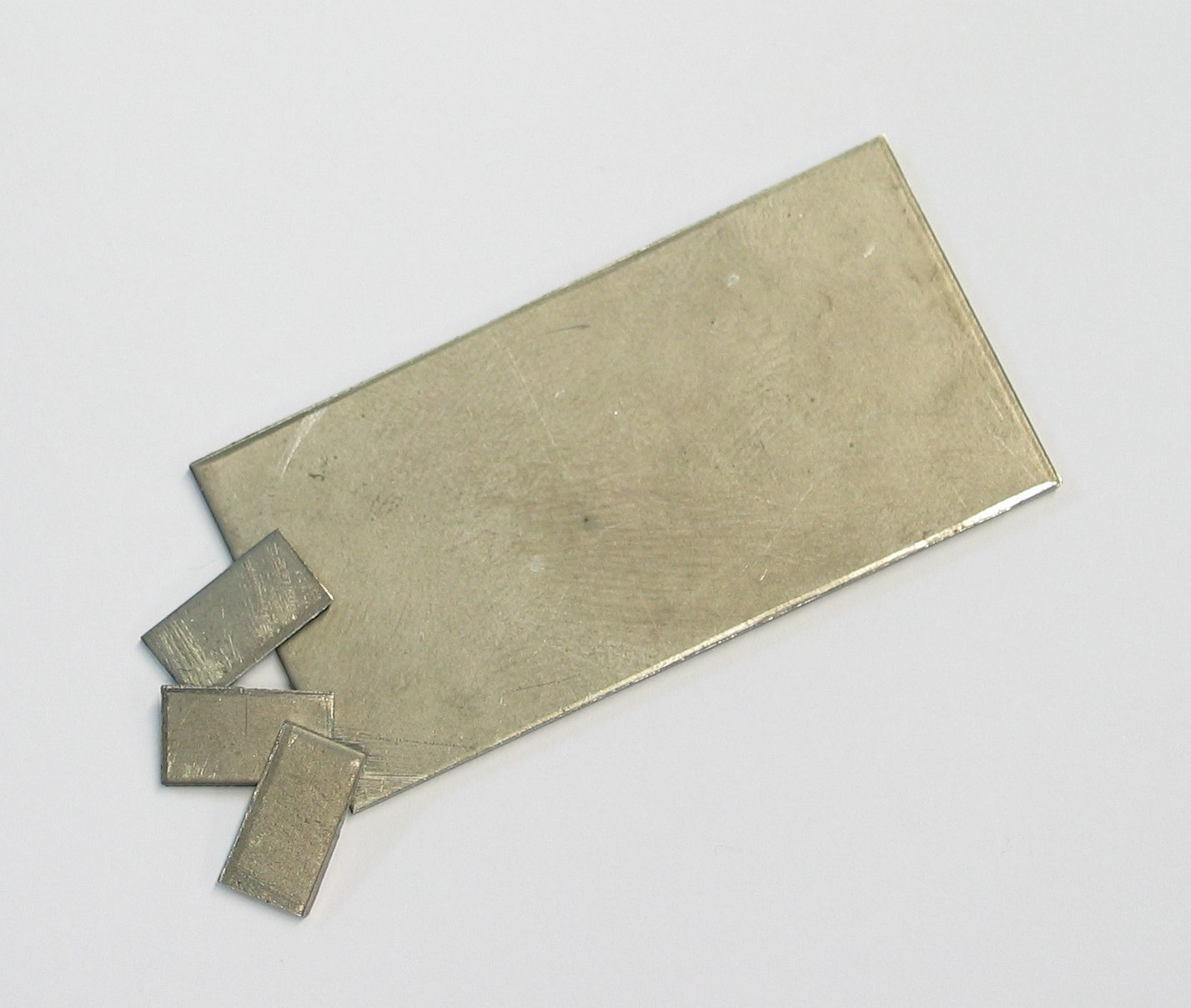
A niobium foil

Out of 44,500 tonnes (44,500,000 kg) of niobium mined in 2006, an estimated 90% was used in high-grade structural steel. The second-largest application is superalloys. Niobium alloy superconductors and electronic components account for a very small share of the world production.

=== Steel production ===
Niobium is an effective microalloying element for steel, within which it forms niobium carbide and niobium nitride. These compounds improve the grain refining, and retard recrystallization and precipitation hardening. These effects in turn increase the toughness, strength, formability, and weldability. Within microalloyed stainless steels, the niobium content is a small (less than 0.1%) but important addition to high-strength low-alloy steels that are widely used structurally in modern automobiles. Niobium is sometimes used in considerably higher quantities for highly wear-resistant machine components and knives, as high as 3% in Crucible CPM S110V stainless steel.

These same niobium alloys are often used in pipeline construction.

=== Superalloys ===
Quantities of niobium are used in nickel-, cobalt-, and iron-based superalloys in proportions as great as 6.5% for such applications as jet engine components, gas turbines, rocket subassemblies, turbocharger systems, heat resisting, and combustion equipment. Niobium precipitates a hardening γ''-phase within the grain structure of the superalloy.

One example superalloy is Inconel 718, consisting of roughly 50% nickel, 18.6% chromium, 18.5% iron, 5% niobium, 3.1% molybdenum, 0.9% titanium, and 0.4% aluminium.

=== Niobium-based alloys ===
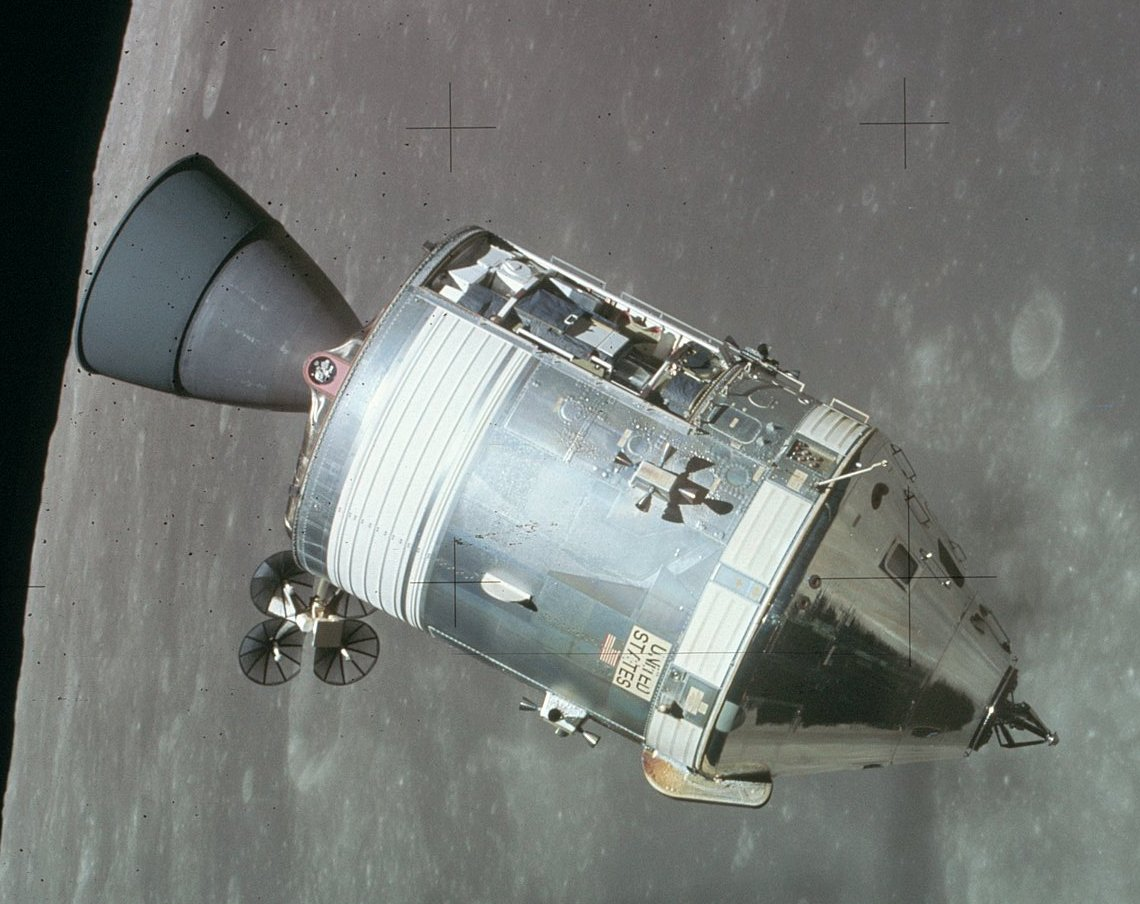
Apollo 15 CSM in lunar orbit; dark nozzle of the service propulsion system is made from niobium–titanium alloy

C-103 alloy was developed in the early 1960s jointly by the Wah Chang Corporation and Boeing Co. DuPont, Union Carbide Corp., General Electric Co. and several other companies were developing niobium alloys simultaneously, largely driven by the Cold War and Space Race. It is composed of 89% niobium, 10% hafnium and 1% titanium and is used for liquid-rocket thruster nozzles, such as the descent engine of the Apollo Lunar Modules. Because niobium is oxidized at temperatures above 400 °C, a protective coating is necessary for these applications to prevent the alloy from becoming brittle.

The reactivity of niobium with oxygen requires it to be worked in a vacuum or inert atmosphere, which significantly increases the cost and difficulty of production. Vacuum arc remelting (VAR) and electron beam melting (EBM), novel processes at the time, enabled the development of niobium and other reactive metals. The project that yielded C-103 began in 1959 with as many as 256 experimental niobium alloys in the "C-series" that could be melted as buttons and rolled into sheet. Wah Chang Corporation had an inventory of hafnium, refined from nuclear-grade zirconium alloys, that it wanted to put to commercial use. The 103rd experimental composition of the C-series alloys, Nb-10Hf-1Ti, had the best combination of formability and high-temperature properties. Wah Chang fabricated the first 500 pounds (230 kg) of C-103 in 1961, ingot to sheet, using EBM and VAR. The intended applications included turbine engines and liquid metal heat exchangers. Competing niobium alloys from that era included FS85 (Nb-10W-28Ta-1Zr) from Fansteel Metallurgical Corp., Cb129Y (Nb-10W-10Hf-0.2Y) from Wah Chang and Boeing, Cb752 (Nb-10W-2.5Zr) from Union Carbide, and Nb1Zr from Superior Tube Co.

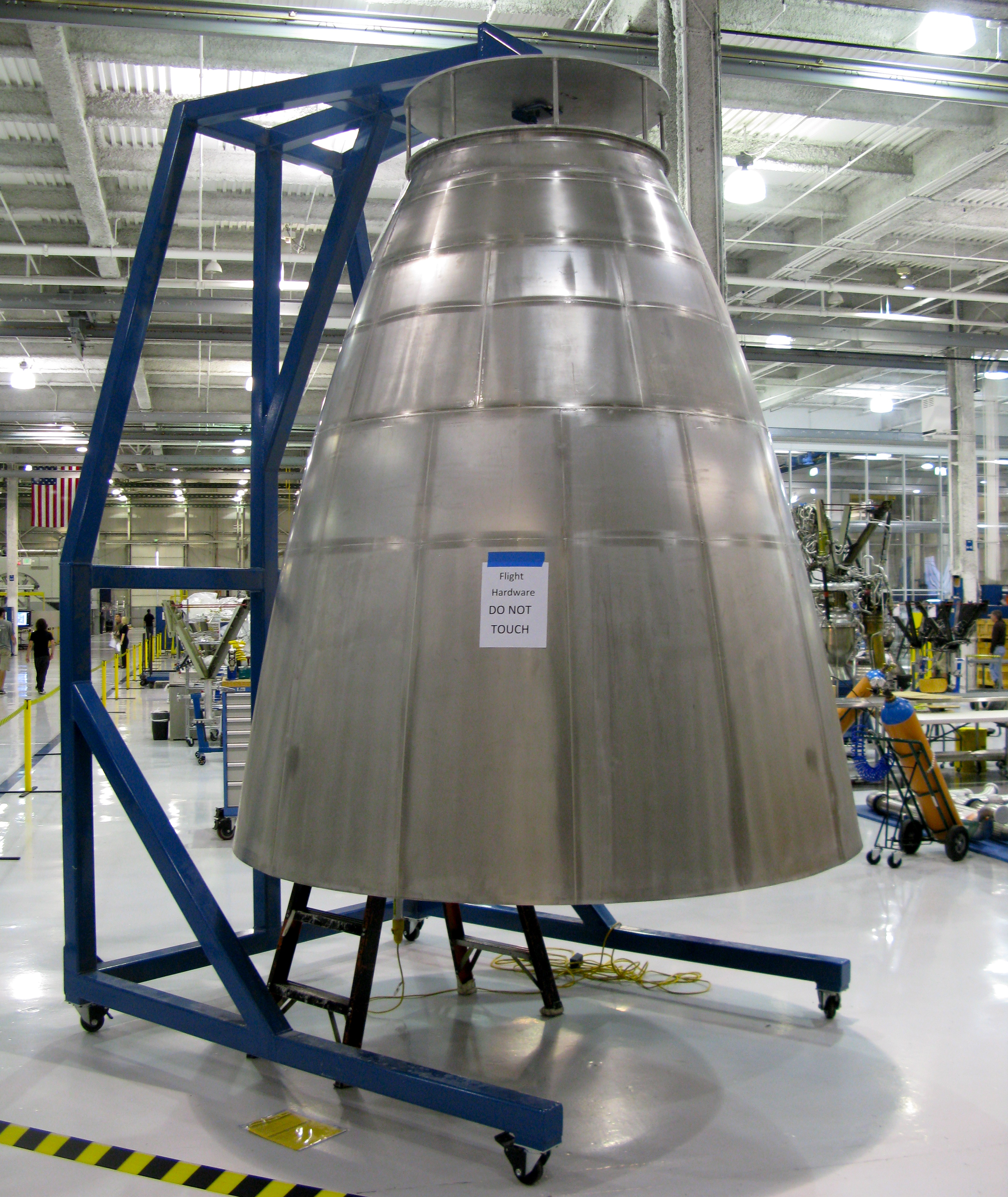
Merlin Vacuum nozzle made from a niobium alloy

The nozzle of the Merlin Vacuum series of engines developed by SpaceX for the upper stage of its Falcon 9 rocket is made from a C-103 niobium alloy.

Niobium-based superalloys are used to produce components of hypersonic missile systems.

=== Superconducting magnets ===
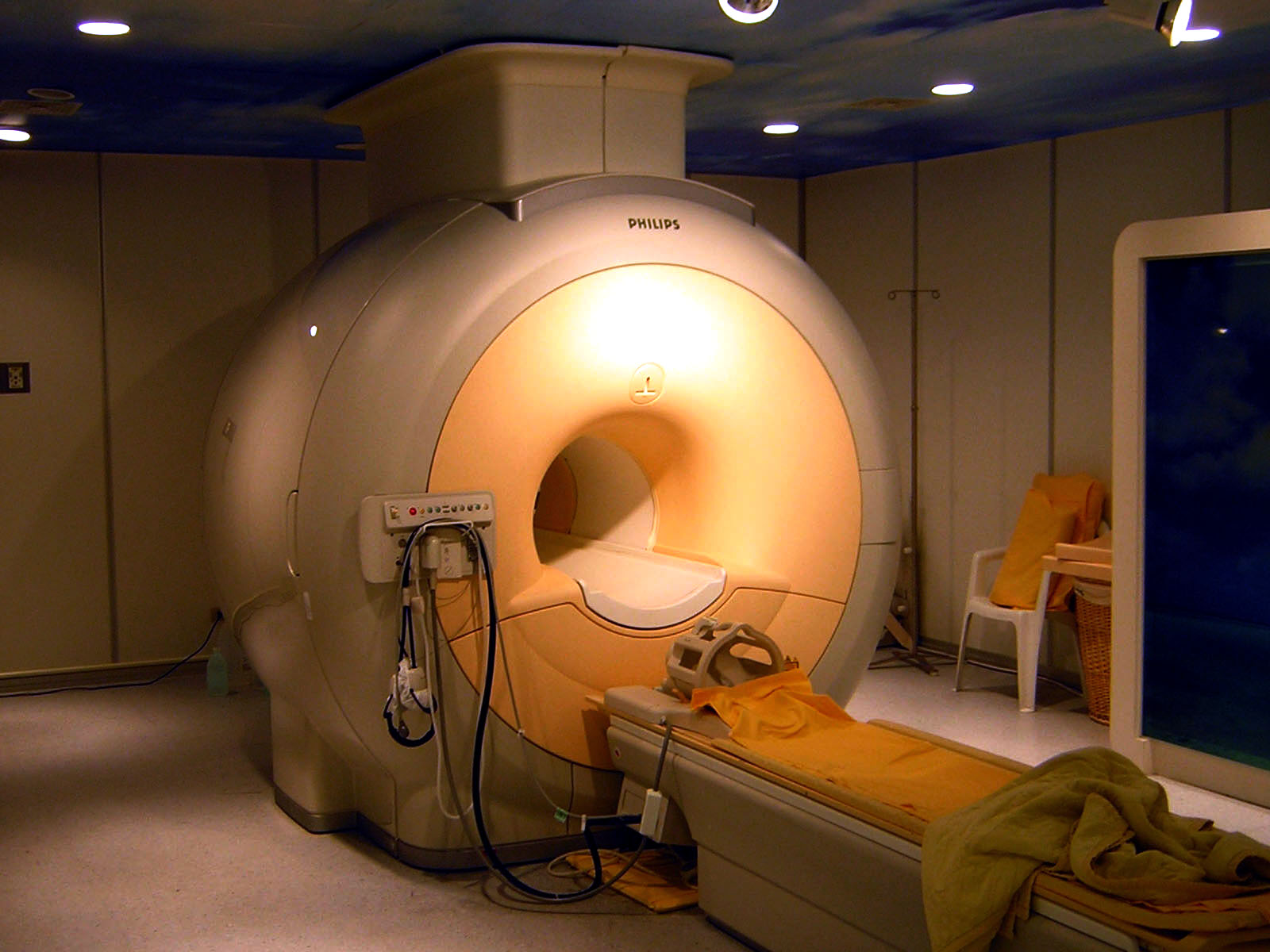
A 3-tesla clinical magnetic resonance imaging scanner using niobium superconducting alloy

Niobium-germanium (Nb_{3}Ge), niobium–tin (Nb_{3}Sn), as well as the niobium–titanium alloys are used as a type II superconductor wire for superconducting magnets. These superconducting magnets are used in magnetic resonance imaging and nuclear magnetic resonance instruments as well as in particle accelerators. For example, the Large Hadron Collider uses 600 short tons (540,000 kg) of superconducting strands, while the International Thermonuclear Experimental Reactor uses an estimated 600 long tons (610,000 kg) of Nb_{3}Sn strands and 250 long tons (250,000 kg) of NbTi strands. In 1992 alone, more than one billion US dollars' worth of clinical magnetic resonance imaging systems were constructed with niobium-titanium wire.

==== Other superconductors ====
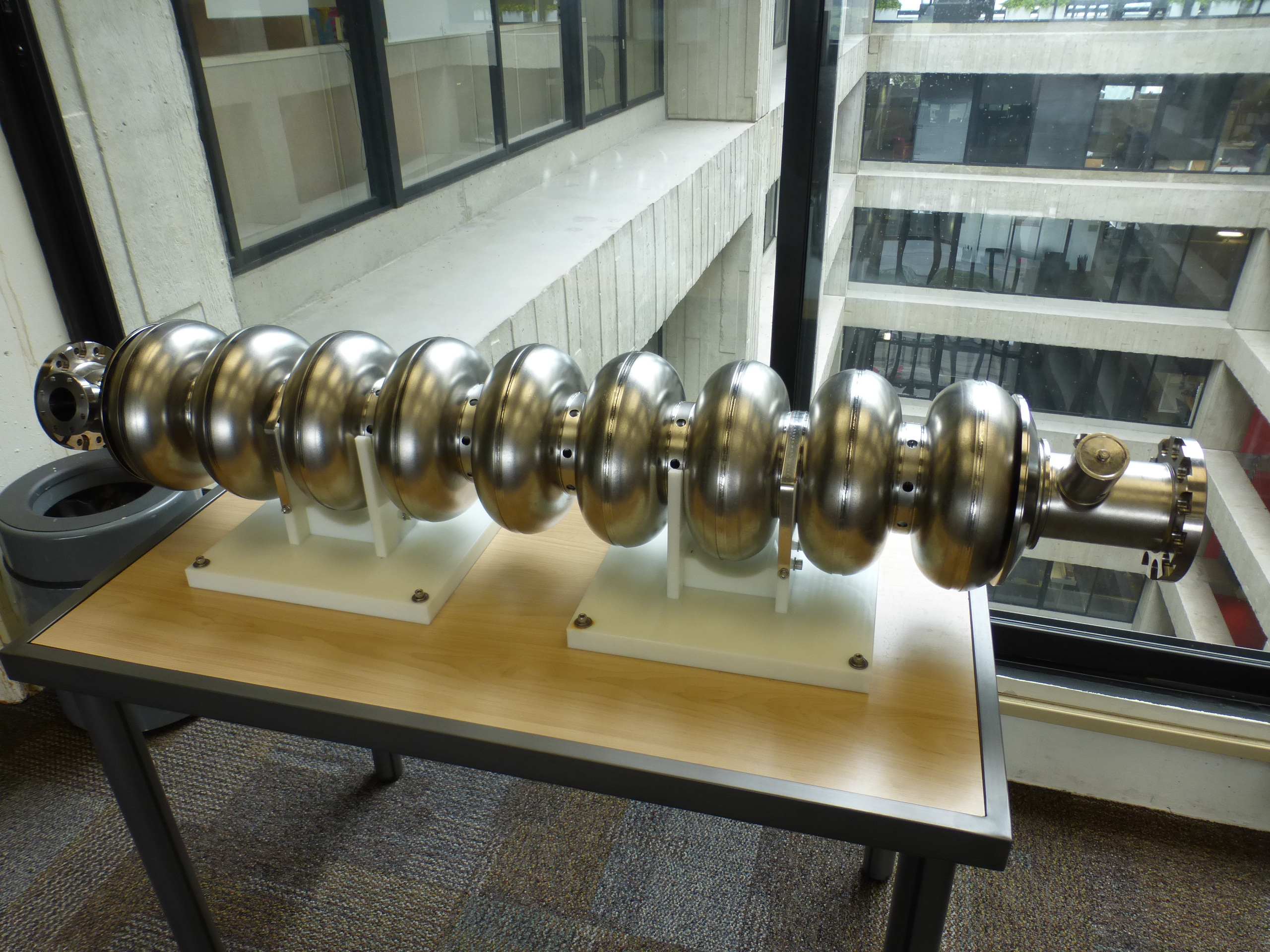
A 1.3 GHz 9-cell superconducting radio frequency cavity made from niobium is on display at Fermilab

The superconducting radio frequency (SRF) cavities used in the free-electron lasers FLASH (result of the cancelled TESLA linear accelerator project) and XFEL are made from pure niobium. A cryomodule team at Fermilab used the same SRF technology from the FLASH project to develop 1.3 GHz nine-cell SRF cavities made from pure niobium. The cavities will be used in the 30-kilometre (19 mi) linear particle accelerator of the International Linear Collider. The same technology will be used in LCLS-II at SLAC National Accelerator Laboratory and PIP-II at Fermilab.

The high sensitivity of superconducting niobium nitride bolometers make them an ideal detector for electromagnetic radiation in the THz frequency band. These detectors were tested at the Heinrich Hertz Submillimeter Telescope, the South Pole Telescope, the Receiver Lab Telescope, and at Atacama Pathfinder Experiment (APEX), and are now used in the HIFI instrument on board the Herschel Space Observatory.

=== Other uses ===
==== Electroceramics ====
Lithium niobate, which is a ferroelectric, is used extensively in mobile telephones and optical modulators, and for the manufacture of surface acoustic wave devices. It belongs to the perovskite (ABO_{3}) structure ferroelectrics like lithium tantalate and barium titanate. Niobium capacitors are available as alternatives to tantalum capacitors. Niobium is added to glass to obtain a higher refractive index, making possible thinner and lighter corrective lenses for eyeglasses.

==== Hypoallergenic applications: medicine and jewelry ====
Niobium and some niobium alloys are physiologically inert and hypoallergenic. For this reason, niobium is used in prosthetics and implant devices, such as pacemakers. Niobium treated with sodium hydroxide forms a porous layer that aids osseointegration.

Like titanium, tantalum, and aluminium, niobium can be heated and anodized to produce a wide array of iridescent colours for jewelry, where its hypoallergenic property is highly desirable.

==== Numismatics ====
Niobium is used as a precious metal in commemorative coins, often with silver or gold. For example, Austria produced a series of silver niobium euro (€) coins starting in 2003; the colour in these coins is created by the diffraction of light by a thin anodized oxide layer. In 2012, ten coins are available showing a broad variety of colours in the centre of the coin: blue, green, brown, purple, violet, or yellow. Two more examples are the 2004 Austrian €25 150-Year Semmering Alpine Railway commemorative coin, and the 2006 Austrian €25 European Satellite Navigation commemorative coin. The Austrian mint produced for Latvia a similar series of coins starting in 2004, with one following in 2007. In 2011, the Royal Canadian Mint started production of a $5 sterling silver and niobium coin named Hunter's Moon in which the niobium was selectively oxidized, thus creating unique finishes where no two coins are exactly alike.

A 150 Years Semmering Alpine Railway Coin made of niobium and silver

==== Other ====
The arc-tube seals of high pressure sodium vapor lamps are made from niobium, sometimes alloyed with 1% of zirconium; niobium has a very similar coefficient of thermal expansion, matching the sintered alumina arc tube ceramic, a translucent material which resists chemical attack or reduction by the hot liquid sodium and sodium vapour contained inside the operating lamp.

Niobium is used in arc welding rods for some stabilized grades of stainless steel and in anodes for cathodic protection systems on some water tanks, which are then usually plated with platinum.

Niobium is used to make the high voltage wire of the solar corona particles receptor module of the Parker Solar Probe.

Niobium is a constituent of a lightfast chemically stable inorganic yellow pigment that has the trade name NTP Yellow. It is Niobium Sulfur Tin Zinc Oxide, a pyrochlore, produced via high-temperature calcination. The pigment is also known as pigment yellow 227, commonly listed as PY 227 or PY227.

Niobium is employed in the atomic energy industry for its high temperature and corrosion resistance, as well as its stability under radiation. It is used in nuclear reactors for components like fuel rods and reactor cores.

Nickel niobium alloys are used in aerospace, oil and gas, construction. They are used in components of jet engines, in ground gas turbines, elements of bridges and high-rise buildings.

== Precautions ==
Niobium
Hazards
NFPA 704 (fire diamond)	0 0 0

Niobium has no known biological role. While niobium dust is an eye and skin irritant and a potential fire hazard, elemental niobium on a larger scale is physiologically inert (and thus hypoallergenic) and harmless. It is often used in jewelry and has been tested for use in some medical implants.

Short- and long-term exposure to niobates and niobium chloride, two water-soluble chemicals, have been tested in rats. Rats treated with a single injection of niobium pentachloride or niobates show a median lethal dose (LD_{50}) between 10 and 100 mg/kg. For oral administration the toxicity is lower; a study with rats yielded a LD_{50} after seven days of 940 mg/kg.
