= Paul Hautefeuille =

French mineralogist and chemist

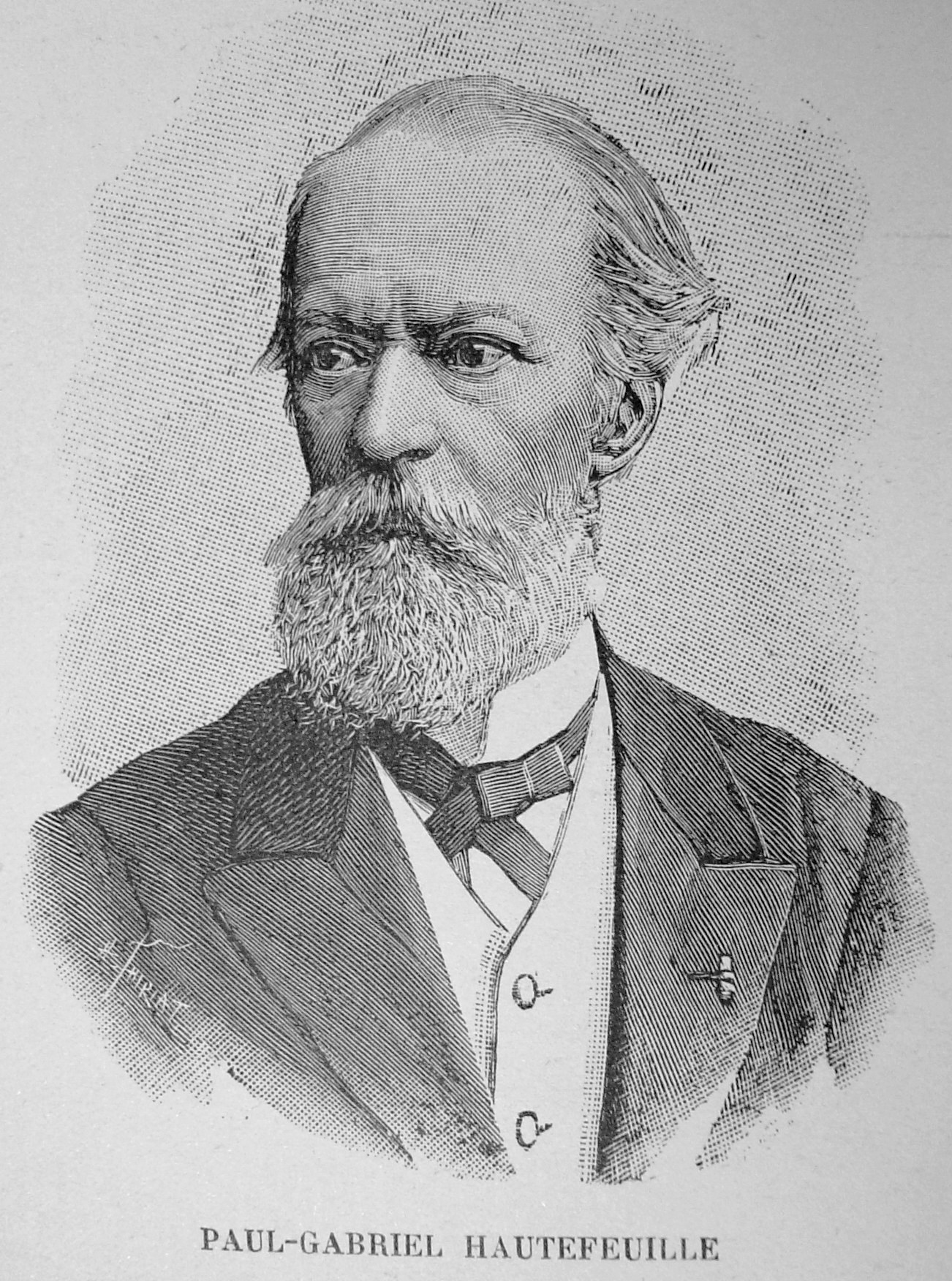
- Paul Hautefeuille (ca. 1890)
- Born: 2 December 1836; Étampes, France
- Died: 8 December 1902 (aged 66); Paris, France
- Scientific career
- Fields: Mineralogy, chemistry
- Thesis: Etudes sur la reproduction des minéraux titanifères (1865)

Paul Gabriel Hautefeuille (2 December 1836 in Étampes – 8 December 1902 in Paris) was a French mineralogist and chemist.

== Biography ==
From 1855, he studied at the École Centrale des Arts et Manufactures in Paris. Later on, by way of a recommendation from Jean-Baptiste Dumas, he was admitted as an assistant to the laboratory of chemist Henri Sainte-Claire Deville at the École Normale Supérieure. In 1865, he earned his doctorates in physical sciences and medicine.

From 1870 to 1885, he served as co-director of the chemical laboratory at the École Normale Supérieure, and in 1876, he replaced Charles Friedel as a lecturer (maitre de conferences) at the school. In 1885, he was appointed professor of mineralogy at the Faculty of Sciences in Paris, and during the same year, was named director of the mineralogical laboratory at the École des Hautes Études.

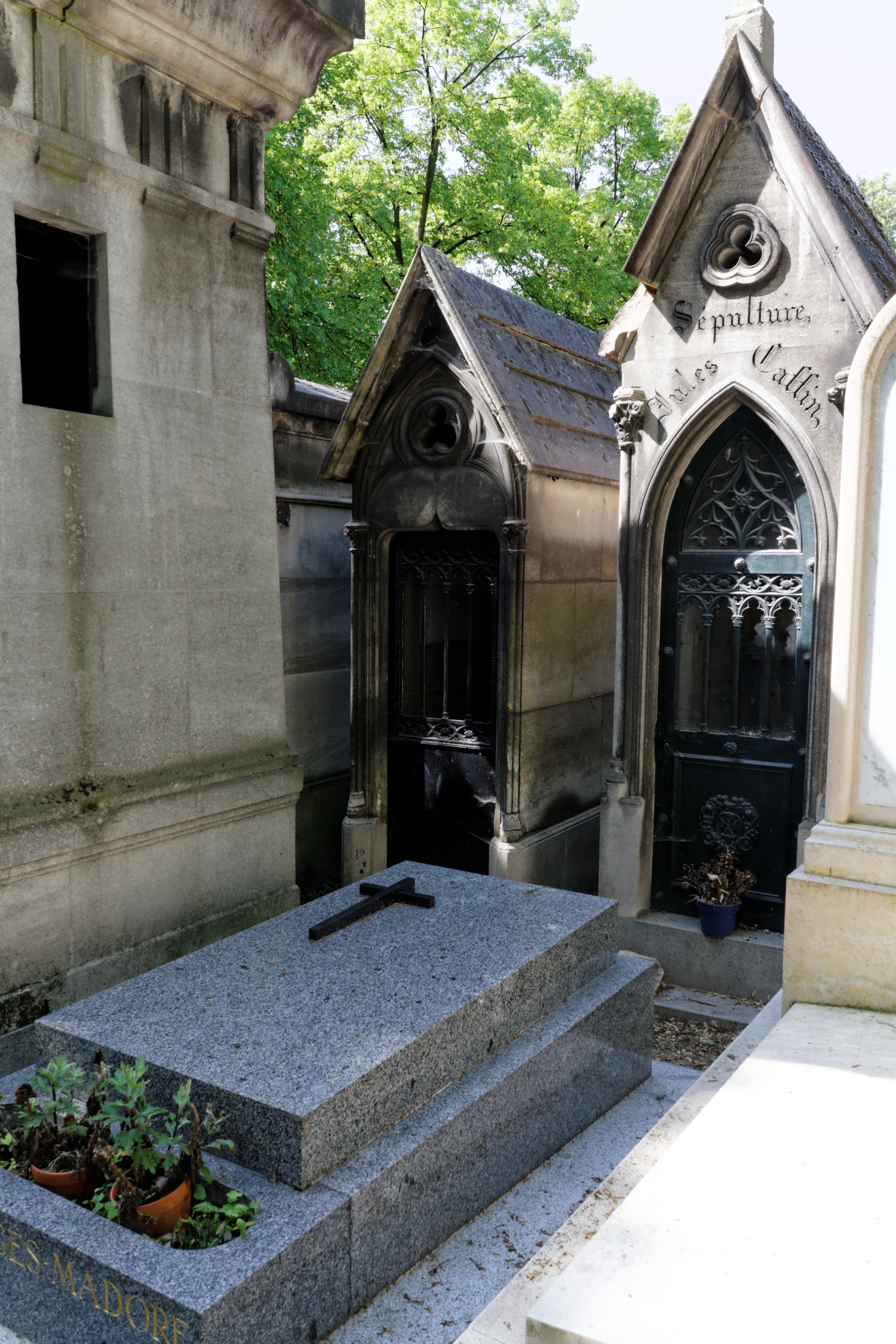
Tomb of Paul Hautefeuille; Père-Lachaise - division 58

== Research ==
He is largely remembered for his work involving mineralogical syntheses, being credited with laboratory reproduction of quartz, tridymite, zircon, beryl, mica, alumina and many other minerals. He determined the temperatures at which minerals dissociate as well as the temperature at which they will crystallize into a particular crystal system. He also conducted research on the oxides of nitrogen.

His scientific papers were published in the Académie des sciences (CRAS), the Bulletin de la Société chimique, the Annales de chimie et de physique, the Annales Scientifiques de l'École Normale Supérieure and the Revue scientifique.
