= Deville process =

The Deville process, also known as the Sainte-Claire Deville process, was the first industrial process used to produce aluminium. It involves reacting sodium metal with aluminium chloride. It was developed by Henri Étienne Sainte-Claire Deville in 1854. Aluminium produced using the Deville process typically contains 1% iron and 0.75% silicon.

== See also ==
- History of aluminium#Early industrial production
- Wöhler process
- Hall–Héroult process
