= Alfred Ditte =

French chemist and professor

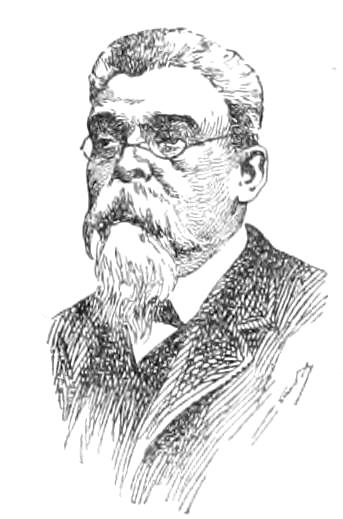

Alfred Ditte (20 October 1843 – 7 November 1908) was a French chemist and a professor at the École Normale Supérieure and later at the Sorbonne. A student of Henri Sainte-Claire Deville, he worked on the dynamics of chemical dissociation, thermodynamics, aluminium corrosion, and iodine compounds.

== Life and work ==
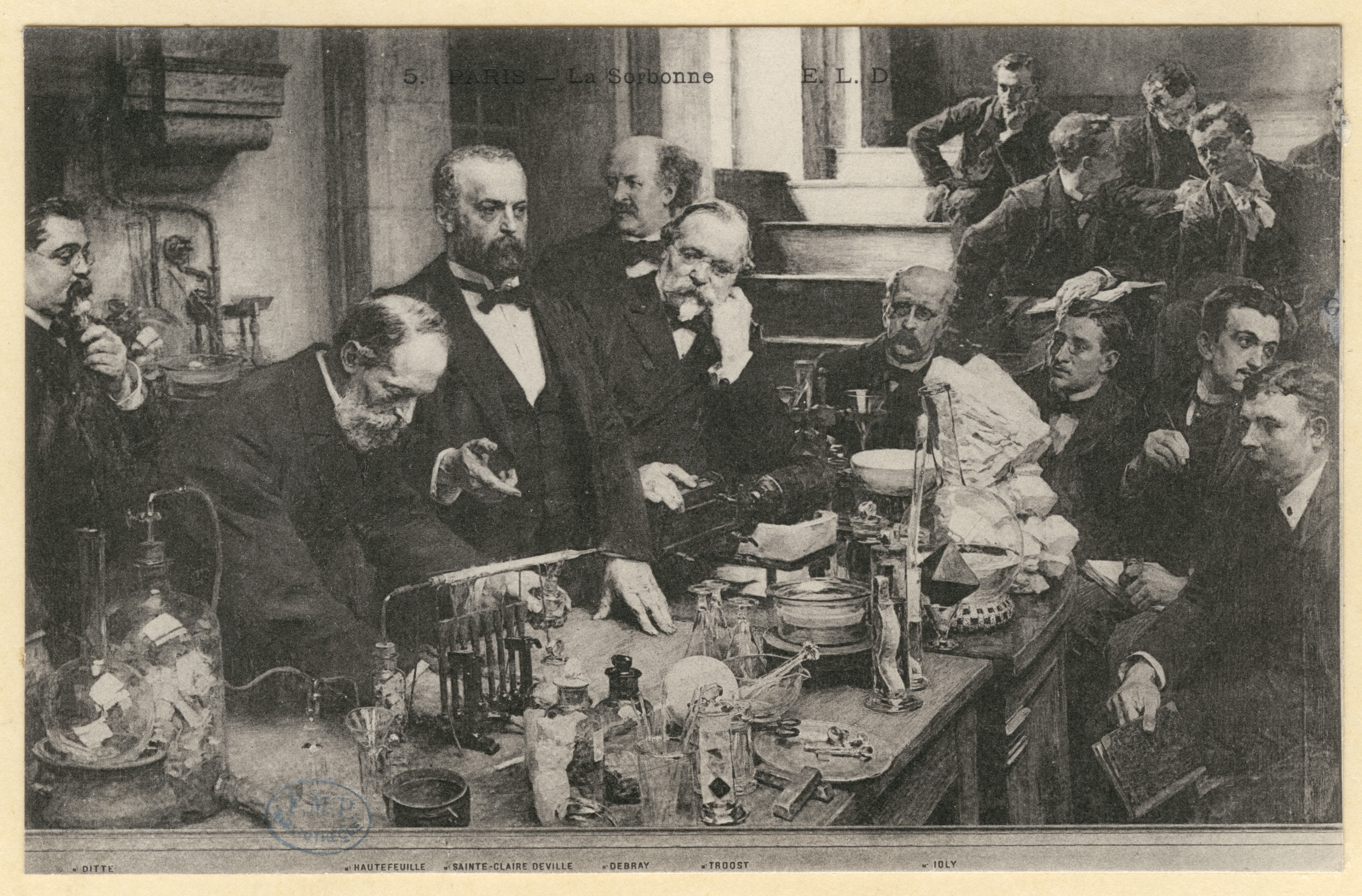
A painting by Léon Augustin Lhermitte (1878) depicting Ditte, Hautefeuille, Deville, Debray, Troost and others

Ditte was born at Rennes and went to the École Normale Supérieure where he studied under Henri Sainte-Claire Deville (1818–1881), Henri Jules Debray (1827–1888), and Louis Joseph Troost (1825–1911). He received a bachelor's degree in 1864 and a doctorate in 1870 with a dissertation on iodic acid (I_{2}O_{5}) and its salts. He then worked on the decomposition of hydrogen selenide and hydrogen telluride working on dissociation equilibria. He became an assistant professor at Caen in 1873 and moved to Paris in 1888 to replace Debray. He was elected to the French Academy of Sciences in 1897 and in 1900 he became professor of inorganic chemistry and director of the laboratories at the Sorbonne. He remained in the position until his death.

Ditte published scientific research papers extensively (and as a rule, as a sole author) and also contributed entries (on tin and uranium) to Edmond Frémy's (1814–1894) Encyclopédie chimique. He examined solubility of nitrates in nitric acid, chlorides in hydrogen chloride and the influence of bases and acids on solubility of a range of other alkaline halides. He also studied antimony, mercury and bismuth salts. He also examined the Leclanché cell in the 1890s, using zinc-platinum electrodes and various electrolytes including ammonium chloride and sodium chloride. In 1885 he examined vanadic acid. In 1898 he re-examined the work of Deville on the resistance of aluminium to corrosion and began to conduct a series of studies. He examined aluminium vessels used by the French in Madagascar from 1894-95 and concluded that aluminium was unsuitable for use in utensils as it contaminated food.
