= Mount Ditte =

Mountain in Graham Land, Antarctica

Mount Ditte (67°43′S 68°37′W) is a mountain, 1,400 metres (4,600 ft) high, surmounting Cape Alexandra in the southeast extremity of Adelaide Island. It was discovered by the French Antarctic Expedition, 1908–10, and named by Jean-Baptiste Charcot for Alfred Ditte, a noted French chemist.
