= Charles Joseph Sainte-Claire Deville =

French geologist and meteorologist

Charles Sainte-Claire Deville
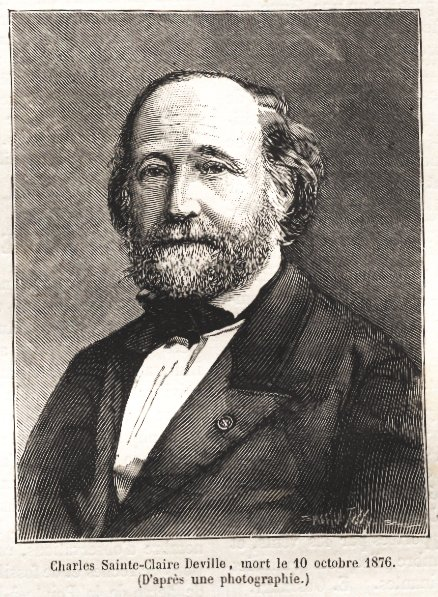
- Born: 26 February 1814; Saint Thomas
- Died: 10 October 1876 (aged 62); Paris, France
- Scientific career
- Fields: Geology, meteorology
- Thesis: Des Modifications du soufre sous l'influence de la chaleur et des dissolvants (1852)

Charles Joseph Sainte-Claire Deville (26 February 1814 – 10 October 1876) was a geologist and meteorologist.

Born in St. Thomas, he was the brother of chemist Henri Etienne Sainte-Claire Deville.

Having attended at the École des Mines in Paris, he assisted Élie de Beaumont in the chair of geology at the Collège de France from 1855 until he succeeded him in 1874. He made researches on volcanic phenomena, especially on the gaseous emanations. He investigated also the variations of temperature in the atmosphere and ocean. In 1864, he became friends with Jules Verne who would later write Journey to the Center of the Earth (1864) in which a scientist ascends the volcano of Stromboli, which Deville had descended into on an earlier expedition.

In 1852, he was one of the founders of the Société Météorologique de France, of which, he served as its first secretary. In 1857, he is elected member of the French Academy of Sciences in replacement of Armand Dufrénoy. In 1859, he was the first to achieve a complete ascent of Grand Combin (4314 meters) in the Pennine Alps. He is promoted Officier de la Légion d'honneur in 1862. He died in Paris.

Charles Sainte-Claire Deville

The Promontorium Deville, a lunar headland, was named after him.

== Publications ==
His published works include:

- Études géologiques sur les îles de Ténériffe et de Fogo (1848) – Geological studies on the islands of Tenerife and Fogo.
- Recherches sur les principaux phénomènes de météorologie et de physique terrestre aux Antilles (1849) – Research on the principal phenomena involving meteorology and terrestrial physics of the Antilles.
- Voyage géologique aux Antilles et aux îles de Ténériffe et de fogo (1856–1864) – Geological voyage to the Antilles and the islands of Tenerife and Fogo.
- Lettres à Élie de Beaumont sur l'éruption du Vésuve – Letters to Élie de Beaumont on the eruption of Vesuvius.
- Les éruptions actuelles du Volcan de Stromboli (1858) – The actual eruptions of the Stromboli volcano.
- Sur les variations périodiques de la température (1866) – On the periodic variations of temperature.
