= Jules Henri Debray =

French chemist

Jules Henri Debray (26 July 1827, in Amiens – 19 July 1888, in Paris) was a French chemist.

In 1847 he began his studies at the École Normale Supérieure in Paris, and several years later became an instructor at the Lycée Charlemagne (1855). From 1875 onward, he taught classes in chemistry at the École Normale Supérieure, where in 1881 he succeeded Henri Étienne Sainte-Claire Deville as professor of chemistry.

He is best remembered for his collaborative research with Sainte-Claire Deville involving the properties of platinum metals, in particular, the melting of platinum and its alloys. Their process for melting platinum remained the chosen method until induction furnaces became available decades later. In 1860, the two scientists were the first to melt an appreciable quantity of iridium.

During his career, Debray served as an assayer for the Bureau de Garantie of Paris, was vice-president of the Société d'Encouragement pour l'Industrie Nationale and was a member of the Académie des sciences.

== Published works ==
- Glucium et des ses composés, 1855 – Beryllium and its compounds.
- De la métallurgie du platine et des métaux qui (with Sainte-Claire Deville), 1861 – On the metallurgy of platinum and associated metals.
- Cours élémentaire de chimie; third edition, revised and augmented, Paris: Dunod, 1870–1876. Elementary courses on chemistry.
- Sur la production des températures élevées et sur la fusion du platine – On producing high temperatures and the melting of platinum.
- Sur une propriété nouvelle du rhodium métallique. Paris, Acad.Sci. Compt. Rend., 78, 1874 with (Sainte-Claire Deville). – On a new property of metallic rhodium.
- Sur les combinaisons de l'acide arsénique et de l'acide molybdique. Paris, Acad. Sei. Compt. Rend., 78, 1874, pp. 1408–1411 – On the combinations of arsenic acid and molybdic acid.
