= Jean Charles Galissard de Marignac =

Swiss chemist (1817–1894)

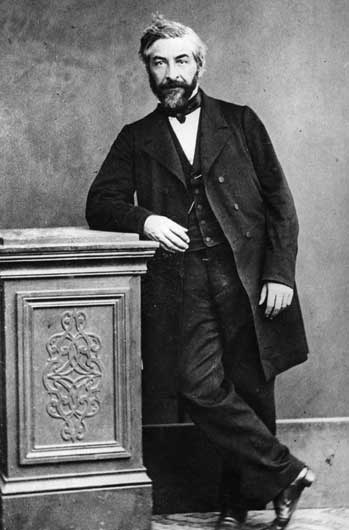
- Galissard de Marignac, c. 1850
- Born: 24 April 1817; Geneva, Switzerland
- Died: 15 April 1894 (aged 76); Geneva, Switzerland
- Known for: Measurement of atomic weights Discovery of ytterbium Codiscovery of gadolinium
- Awards: Pour le Mérite (1888); Davy Medal (1886)
- Scientific career
- Fields: Chemistry

Jean Charles Galissard de Marignac (24 April 1817 – 15 April 1894) was a Swiss chemist whose work with atomic weights suggested the possibility of isotopes and the packing fraction of nuclei. His study of the rare earth elements led to his discovery of ytterbium in 1878 and co-discovery of gadolinium in 1880.

He was considered "one of the great chemists of the nineteenth century", particularly in the area of inorganic chemistry. On 13 September 2011, the site of his laboratory at the University of Geneva was designated a historical chemical landmark of Switzerland.

== Life and work ==
Jean Charles Galissard de Marignac was born in Geneva on 24 April 1817, to Jacob Galissard de Marignac, a judge, and Susanne Le Royer, a sister of well-known chemist and physiologist Elie Le Royer. Le Royer's pharmacy was in the same building as their home.

Marignac attended the École polytechnique in Paris with the intention of becoming a mining engineer. From 1837 to 1839, he studied at the École des mines. The following year was spent traveling and visiting well-known scientists. Marignac worked briefly with Justus von Liebig, and with Alexandre Brongniart in the Sèvres porcelain factory. He also may have been influenced by Jöns Jacob Berzelius.

On his return, Marignac became in 1841 a professor of chemistry at the Academy of Geneva. In 1845 he was appointed professor of mineralogy as well. He held both chairs until 1878, when he resigned due to poor health. He was able to continue working in a laboratory at his house until 1884, when he became so debilitated that he could no longer work. Marignac died at Geneva on 15 April 1894.

Marignac's name is well known for the careful and exact determinations of atomic weights. Whenever possible, he used at least two independent methods to assess a sample. He carried these out for long-identified elements and for newly proposed elements. In undertaking this work he had, like Belgian chemist Jean Stas, the purpose of testing Prout's hypothesis, the idea that atomic weights are multiples of hydrogen. However, he remained more disposed than the Belgian chemist to consider the possibility that it may have some degree of validity. By establishing well-defined values for a wide variety of elements, he seriously contributed to the underlying basis of inorganic chemistry.

Throughout his life he paid great attention to the rare earths and the problem of separating and distinguishing them. In 1878 Marignac extracted ytterbium from what was supposed to be pure erbia. In 1880 he found gadolinium and samarium in the samarskite earths.

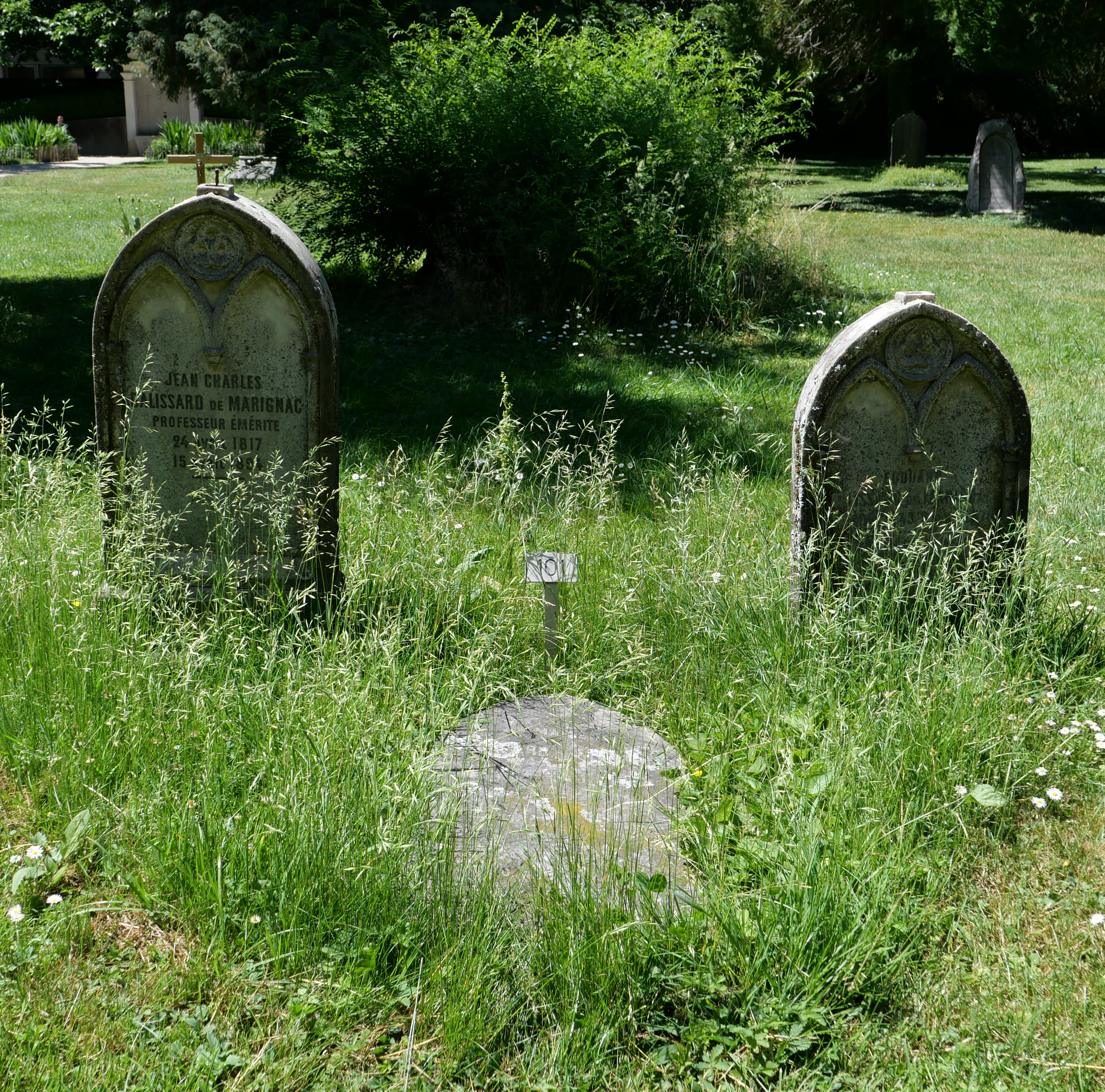
The family grave

In 1858, he pointed out the isomorphism of the fluostannates and the fluosilicates, thus settling the then vexed question of the composition of silicic acid. This research helped him to confirm the atomic weights of zirconium and titanium. Subsequently Marignac studied the fluorides of boron, tungsten, and other elements. He prepared silicotungstic acid, one of the first examples of the complex inorganic acids.

Marignac discovered that niobium and tantalum could be separated by fractional crystallization separation of potassium heptafluorotantalate from potassium oxypentafluoroniobate monohydrate, a process which was used commercially until displaced by solvent extraction separation of the same fluorides starting in the 1950s.

In physical chemistry, he carried out extensive research on the nature and process of solutions, investigating in particular the thermal effects produced by the dilution of saline solutions, the variation of the specific heat of saline solutions with temperature and concentration, and the phenomena of liquid diffusion.

Galissard de Marignac is buried with his wife Marie, née Dominicé, and their son Edouard (1849-1871) at the Cimetière des Rois, which is considered the Pantheon of Geneva.
