= Christian Wilhelm Blomstrand =

Swedish mineralogist and chemist

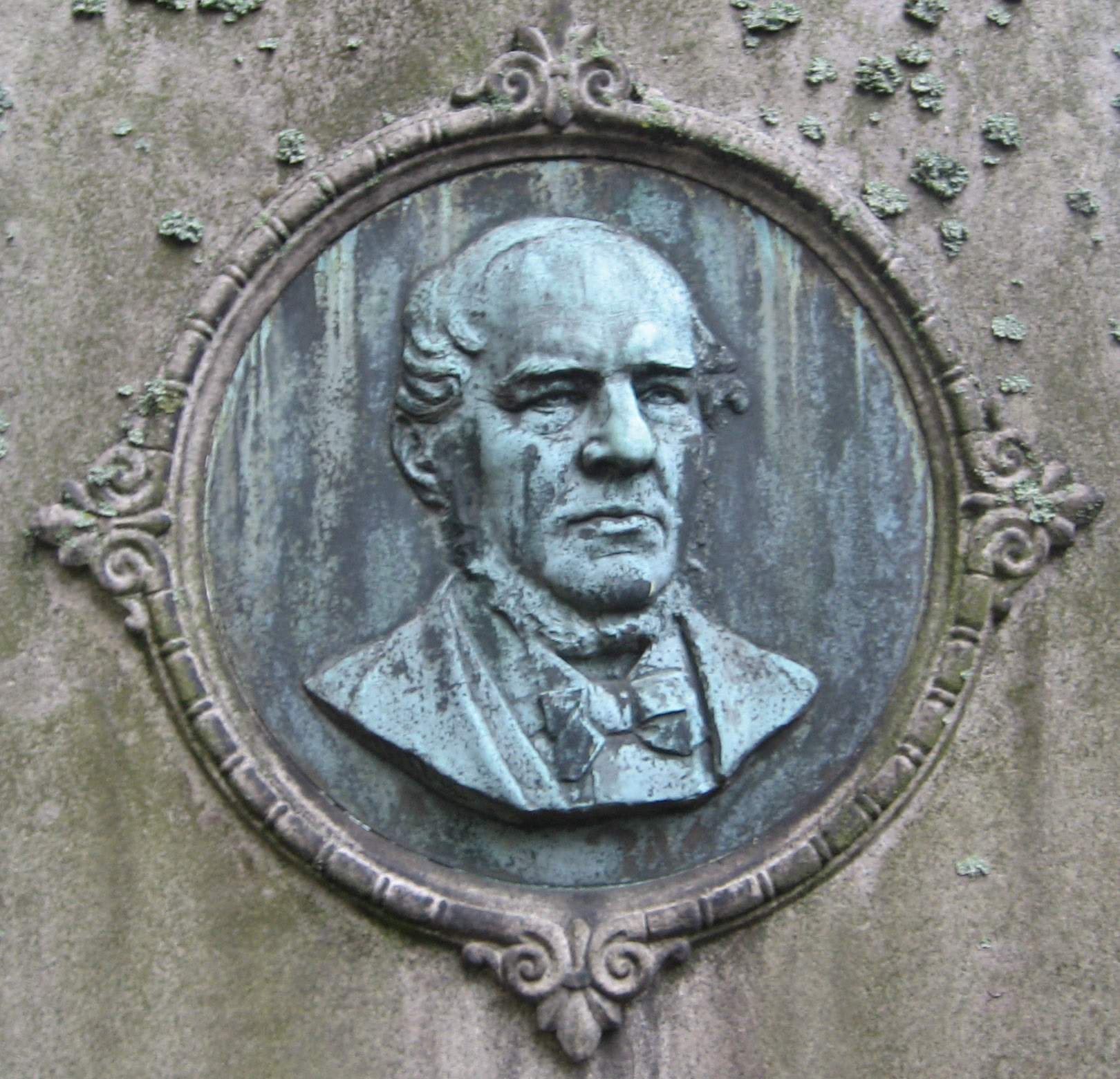
- Christian Wilhelm Blomstrand
- Born: 20 October 1826; Växjö, Småland, Sweden
- Died: 5 November 1897 (aged 71); Lund, Sweden
- Education: University of Lund
- Known for: First isolation of niobium Enhanced understanding of periodicity Chain theory of coordination compounds
- Scientific career
- Fields: Chemistry
- Workplaces: University of Lund

Christian Wilhelm Blomstrand (20 October 1826 – 5 November 1897) was a Swedish mineralogist and chemist. He was a professor at the University of Lund from 1862 to 1895, where he isolated the element niobium in 1864. He developed an early version of the periodic table and made advances in understanding the chemistry of coordination compounds. Blomstrand published textbooks in chemistry and was well known internationally for his scientific contributions.

== Education and career ==
Blomstrand was born in Växjö, Sweden to his father John Blomstrand, who was a teacher, and his wife Severina Rodhe.

Blomstrand studied mineralogy at the University of Lund, where he earned a philosophy degree in 1850. He then became interested in chemistry and was the first recipient of the Berzelius scholarship. In 1854, he completed his habilitation for research on bromine and iodine compounds of tin. With the exception of lecturing at the Elementary Technical School of Malmö in 1855 and working as a mineralogist on an expedition to Spitsbergen in 1861, Blomstrand's entire career was at the University of Lund.

Blomstrand was appointed an adjunct lecturer and laboratory demonstrator in chemistry at the University of Lund in 1856. He became a member of the Royal Swedish Academy of Sciences in 1861. He became a professor of chemistry and mineralogy at Lund in 1862, remaining there until his retirement in 1895. He served as rector of the university from 1871 to 1872.

== The elements ==
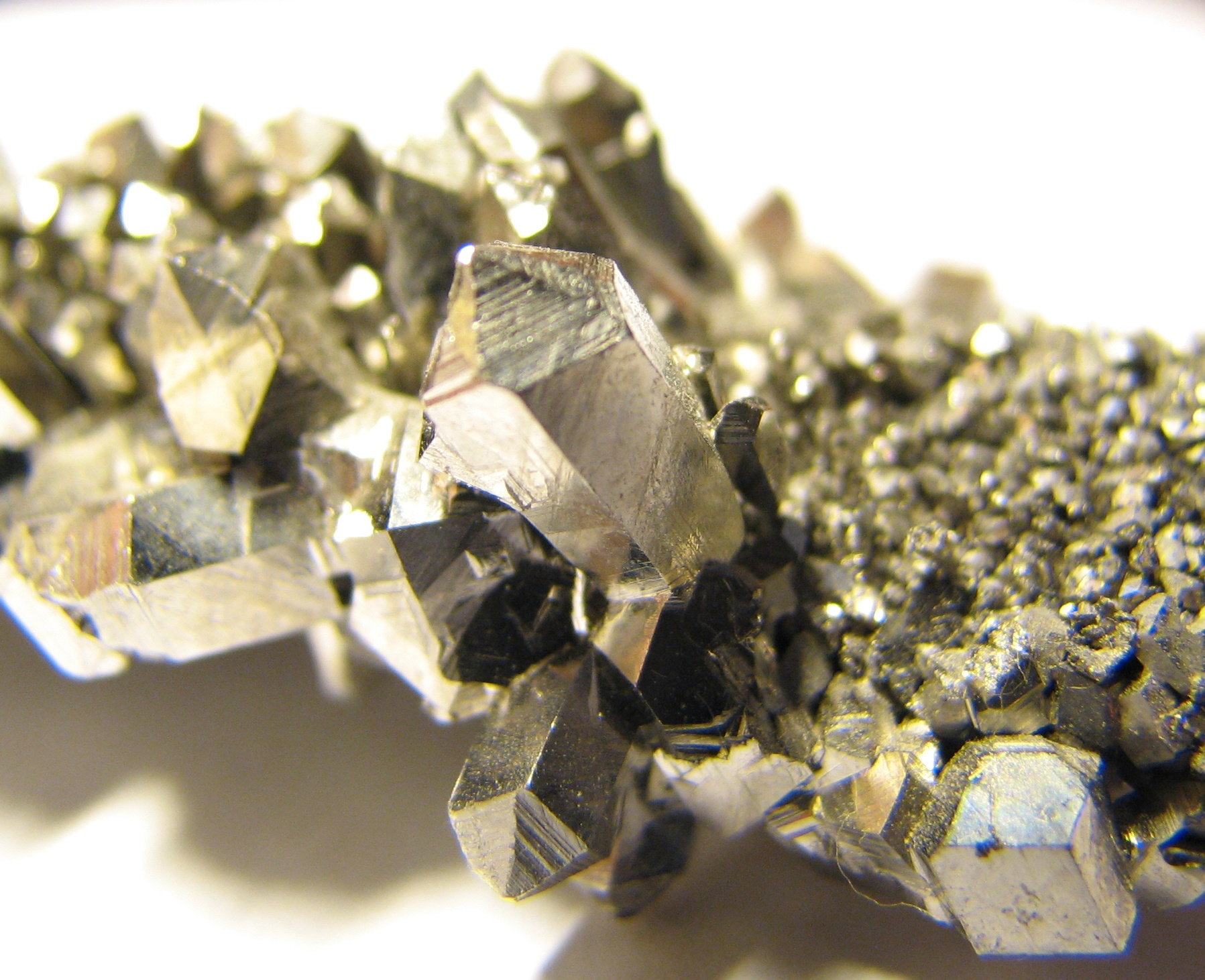
Niobium crystals

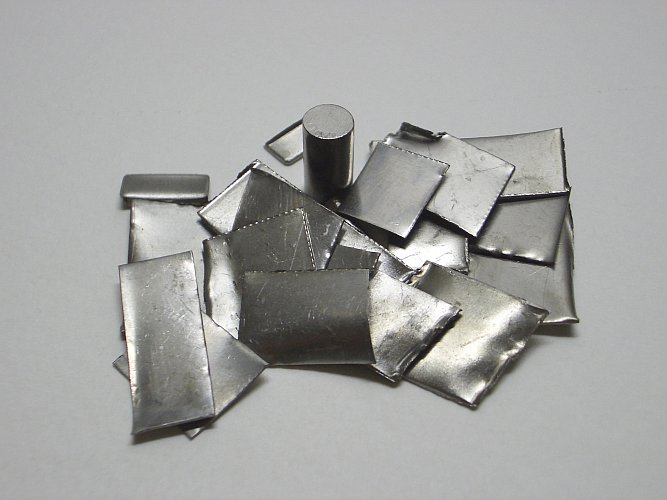
Purified niobium

Blomstrand's experimental research involved the characterization and analysis of minerals, particularly those which were rare or of unknown composition. These included euxenite, ilmenite, monazite, niobite, and tantalite. He focused on the chemical analysis of what are now known as the group Vb subgroup of Group 5 elements. These "earth acids" include the elements tantalum, niobium, molybdenum, tungsten, and their various mineral associates.

In 1864, Blomstrand was the first person to successfully obtain the element niobium in pure form. Blomstrand had been studying various metal chlorides, and he identified the oxychloride of niobium, NbOCl_{3} as part of this investigation. He then isolated niobium by placing niobium chloride in an atmosphere of hydrogen and heating it. In that way, he obtained pure metallic niobium as a steel-gray material. Niobium had previously been discovered in 1801 by English scientist Charles Hatchett, using an ore obtained from the United States. Hackett named the element Columbium, only being renamed Niobium in 1950. However, the element was not obtained in pure form until Blomstrand conducted his investigations.

In 1870, Blomstrand proposed a new way of systematizing the elements, a "natural system" based on atomicity (the ability of elements to combine with other elements) and the electrochemical properties of the element. Organizing the elements into subgroups of even and odd atomicity revealed "extraordinary regularities". While Blomsrand's system was a significant advance toward developing a periodic table of the elements, it did not account well for metals. Blomstrand included his system in his revised edition of Nils Johan Berlin's popular textbook in 1870, and in his own textbooks in 1873 and 1875. Dmitri Mendeleev, later credited with developing the periodic table in widespread use, credited Blomstrand with important early advances leading to the organization of the periodic system.

== Chemical structure ==
One of Blomstrand's goals was to develop an understanding of how atoms are bonded together to form compounds and the resulting chemical structures of compounds. He attempted to reconcile the dualistic theory of Jöns Jacob Berzelius with unitary and type theories.

Blomstrand developed the most widely accepted of the 19th century theories of coordination complexes. His chain theory (1869) was further developed, modified, and experimentally supported by his colleague Sophus Mads Jørgensen. Jørgensen prepared numerous examples of coordination complexes, providing an experimental foundation for Blomstrand-Jørgensen chain theory and for Alfred Werner's coordination theory (1893). In developing the theory, Blomstrand reconciled the low reactivity of the ammonia molecules present in metal ammine complexes by theorizing that the ammonia molecules were chemically linked together in a chain, rendering them chemically unreactive. This chain theory was superseded in 1893, almost 25 years later, when Alfred Werner proposed his coordination theory.

"It is the important task of the chemist to reproduce faithfully in his own way the elaborate constructions which we call chemical compounds, in the erection of which the atoms serve as building stones, and to determine the number and relative positions of the points of attack at which any atom attaches itself to any other; in short, to determine the distribution of the atoms in space." Blomstrand, Die Chemie der Jetztzeit (Chemistry of Today, 1869)

== Recognition ==
The island Blomstrandhalvøya and the glacier Blomstrandbreen on Spitsbergen are named after him.

== Representative publications ==
- Blomstrand, Kristian Vilhelm (1869). Die Chemie der Jetztzeit: vom Standpunkte der electrochemischen Auffassung, aus Berzelius Lehre entwickelt. ISBN 978-1-144-80510-2.
- Kemper, R. (1869). "Die Chemie der Jetztzeit vom Standpunkte der elektrochemischen Auffassung aus Berzelius Lehre entwickelt von C. W. Blomstrand. XIV. u. 417 S. Heidelberg, Carl Winter 1869". Archiv der Pharmazie. 189 (1–2): 173–175. doi:10.1002/ardp.18691890162. S2CID 97036099.
