= Louis Joseph Troost =

French chemist

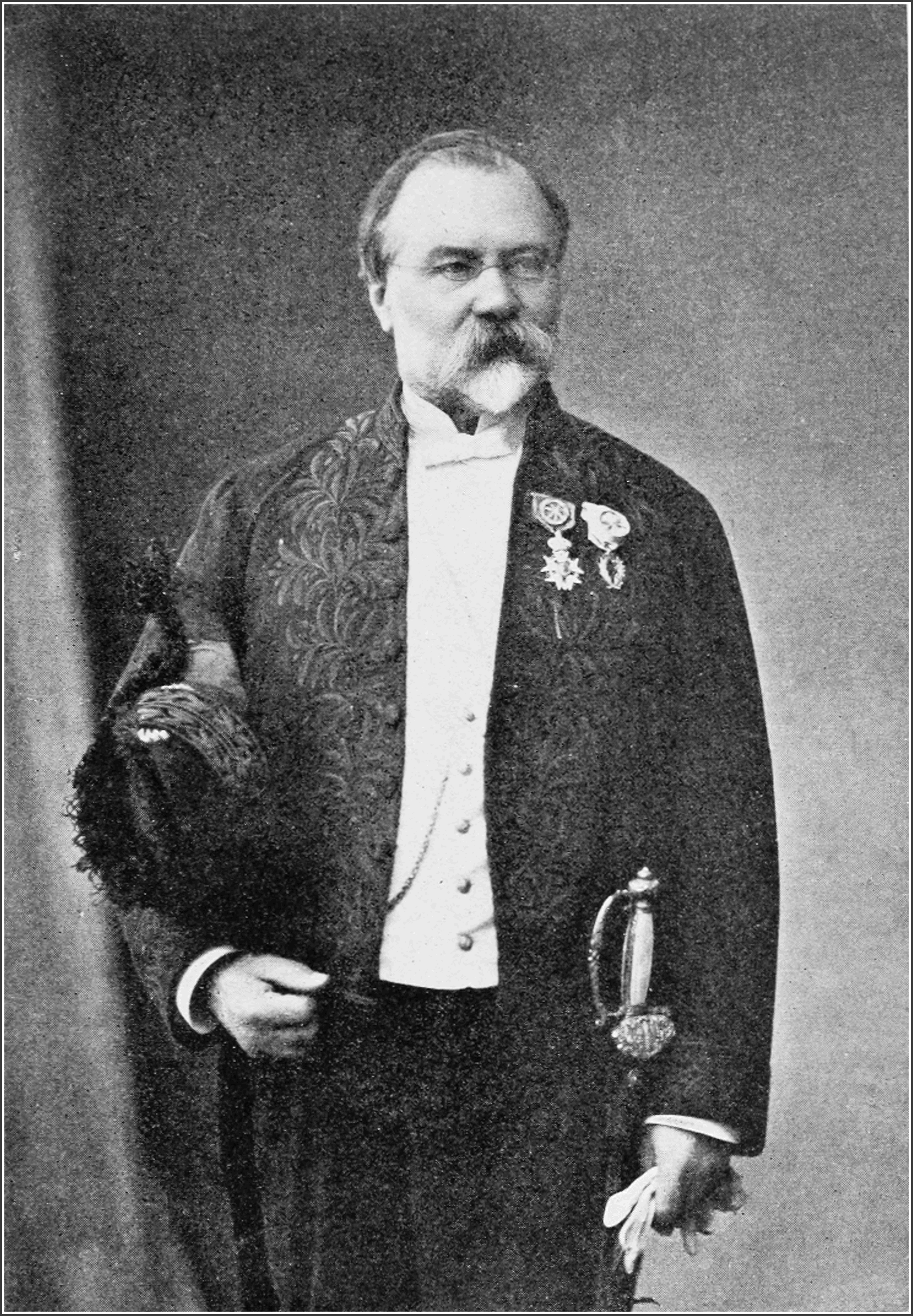
- Born: 17 October 1825; Paris, France
- Died: 30 September 1911 (aged 85)
- Scientific career
- Workplaces: École Normale; Sorbonne

Louis Joseph Troost (17 October 1825, Paris – 30 September 1911) was a French chemist.

== Biography ==
In 1848, he began his studies at the École Normale Supérieure in Paris, where from 1851 he worked as an assistant chemist. In 1856, he received his doctorate of sciences. After serving as chair of chemistry at the Lycée Bonaparte, he became a lecturer at the École Normale Supérieure (from 1868). Beginning in 1874, he was a professor of chemistry to the faculty of sciences in Paris, and in 1884, replaced Charles Adolphe Wurtz as a member of the Académie des sciences.

With Henri Sainte-Claire Deville, he worked on determining vapor densities at high temperatures and conducted studies on the porosity of metals at high temperatures. Also with Deville, he helped advance the concept of "chemical dissociation". In addition, he performed significant studies of lithium salts, and with Paul Hautefeuille, he conducted research on the solubility of gases in metals.

== Selected works ==
Troost was the author of Traité élémentaire de chimie (1847; 24th edition, 1948) that became a standard textbook for successive generations of students. His other noted works are:

- Recherches sur le lithium et ses composés, 1857.
- Precis de chimie, third edition, 1870.
