= Henri Étienne Sainte-Claire Deville =

French chemist (1818–1881)

Henri Sainte-Claire Deville
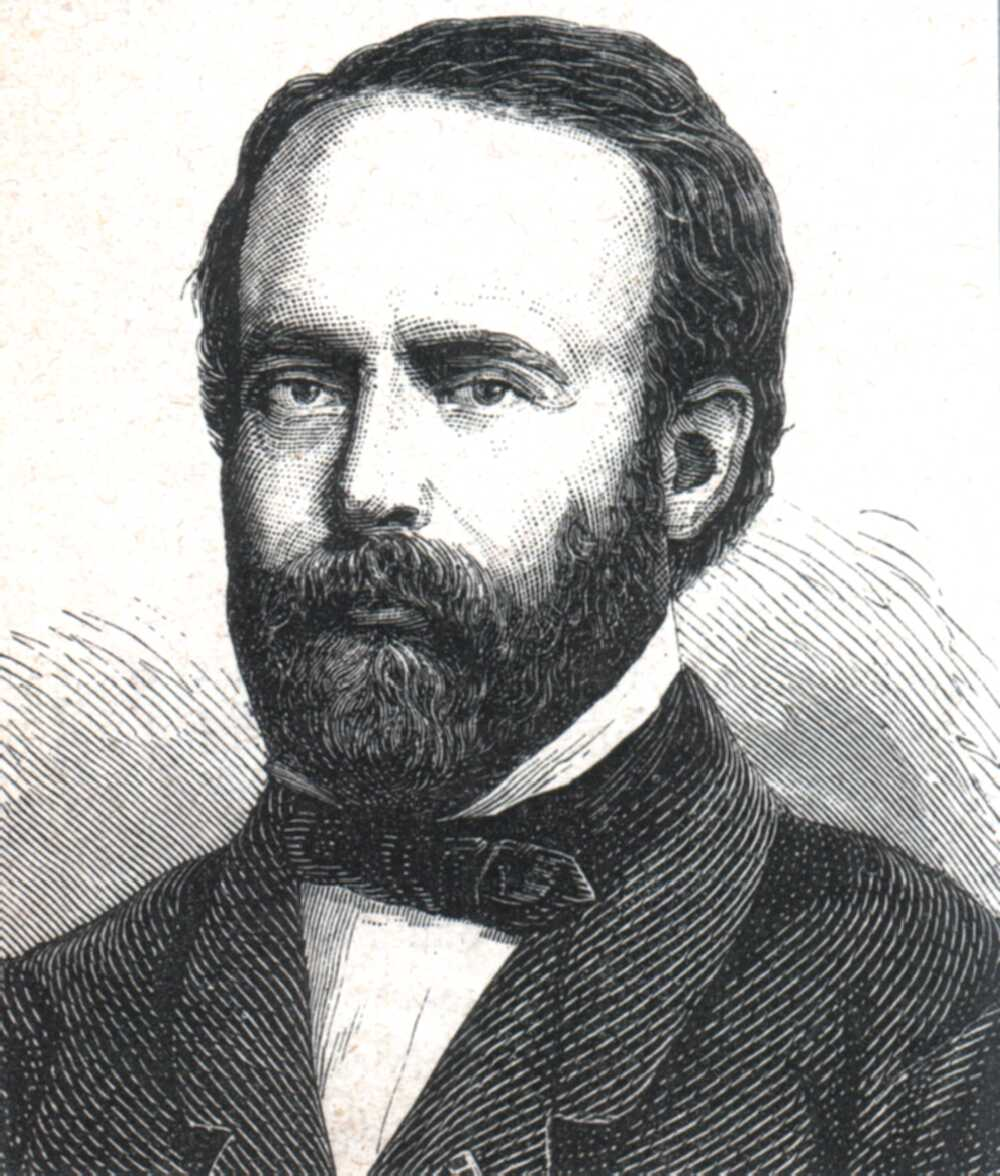
- Born: 11 March 1818; St Thomas, Danish West Indies
- Died: 1 July 1881 (aged 63); Boulogne-sur-Seine, France
- Known for: Deville process
- Scientific career
- Workplaces: École Normale; Sorbonne
- Doctoral students: Louis Joseph Troost; Alfred Ditte

Henri Étienne Sainte-Claire Deville (11 March 1818 – 1 July 1881) was a French chemist.

He was born in the island of St Thomas in the Danish West Indies, where his father was French consul. Together with his elder brother Charles, he was educated in Paris at the collège Rollin. In 1844, having graduated as a doctor of medicine and doctor of science, he was appointed to organize the new faculty of science at Besançon, where he acted as dean and professor of chemistry from 1845 to 1851. Returning to Paris in the latter year he succeeded Antoine Jérôme Balard at the École Normale, and in 1859 became professor at the Sorbonne in place of J. B. A. Dumas, for whom he had begun to lecture in 1853. He died at Boulogne-sur-Seine.

In 1841, he began his experiments with investigations of oil of turpentine and tolu balsam, in the course of which he discovered toluene. But his most important work was perhaps in inorganic and thermal chemistry. In 1849 he discovered anhydrous nitric acid (nitrogen pentoxide), a substance interesting as the first obtained of the so-called "anhydrides" of the monobasic acids. In 1854, he succeeded in obtaining metallic aluminium, and ultimately he devised a method by which the metal could be prepared on a large scale by the aid of sodium, the manufacture of which he also developed. Together with Friedrich Wöhler, he discovered silicon nitride in 1857. With Jules Henri Debray (1827–1888) he worked at the platinum metals, his object being on the one hand to prepare them pure, and on the other to find a suitable metal for the standard metre for the International Metric Commission then sitting at Paris. With Louis Joseph Troost (born 1825) he devised a method for determining vapour densities at temperatures up to 1400˚C, and, partly with F. Wöhler, he investigated the allotropic forms of silicon and boron.

The artificial preparation of minerals, especially of apatite and isorhor-phous minerals and of crystalline oxides, was another subject in which he made many experiments. But his best known contribution to general chemistry is his work on the phenomena of reversible reactions, which he comprehended under a general theory of "dissociation". He first took up the subject about 1857, and it was in the course of his investigations on it that he devised the apparatus known as the "Deville hot and cold tube."

Deville was elected to the American Philosophical Society in 1860. In 1885, the rue Sainte-Claire-Deville in the 12th arrondissement de Paris was named in his honour.

== See also ==
- Devilline
- History of aluminium

== Selected publications ==
- "De l'aluminium et de ses combinaisons chimiques", Comptes-rendus de l'Académie des sciences (1854), article analysé sur le site BibNum.
- "Mémoire sur la fabrication du sodium et de l'aluminium", Annales de chimie et de physique, 46 (1856), 415-58
- "De l'aluminium, ses propriétés, sa fabrication et ses applications", 1 vol., in-8°, Paris, Mallet-Bachelier, 1859,176 pages
- "L'état naissant des corps", la Revue scientifique, 22 janvier 1870.
- "L'internat dans l'éducation", la Revue scientifique, 2 septembre 1871.
