= Period 6 element =

Row 6 of the periodic table

A period 6 element is one of the chemical elements in the sixth row (or period) of the periodic table of the chemical elements, including the lanthanides. The periodic table is laid out in rows to illustrate recurring (periodic) trends in the chemical behaviour of the elements as their atomic number increases: a new row is begun when chemical behaviour begins to repeat, meaning that elements with similar behaviour fall into the same vertical columns. The sixth period contains 32 elements, tied for the most with period 7, beginning with caesium and ending with radon. Lead is currently the last stable element; all subsequent elements are radioactive. For bismuth, however, its only primordial isotope, ^{209}Bi, has a half-life of more than 10^{19} years, over a billion times longer than the current age of the universe. As a rule, period 6 elements fill their 6s shells first, then their 4f, 5d, and 6p shells, in that order; however, there are exceptions, such as gold.

== Properties ==
This period contains the lanthanides, also known as the rare earths. Many lanthanides are known for their magnetic properties, such as neodymium. Many period 6 transition metals are very valuable, such as gold, however many period 6 other metals are incredibly toxic, such as thallium. Period 6 contains the last stable element, lead. All subsequent elements in the periodic table are radioactive. After bismuth, which has a half-life or more than 10^{19} years, polonium, astatine, and radon are some of the shortest-lived and rarest elements known; less than a gram of astatine is estimated to exist on earth at any given time.

== Atomic characteristics ==
Chemical element			Block	Electron configuration
55	Cs	Caesium	s-block	[Xe] 6s^{1}
56	Ba	Barium	s-block	[Xe] 6s^{2}
57	La	Lanthanum	f-block ^{[a]}	[Xe] 5d^{1} 6s^{2} ^{[b]}
58	Ce	Cerium	f-block	[Xe] 4f^{1} 5d^{1} 6s^{2} ^{[b]}
59	Pr	Praseodymium	f-block	[Xe] 4f^{3} 6s^{2}
60	Nd	Neodymium	f-block	[Xe] 4f^{4} 6s^{2}
61	Pm	Promethium	f-block	[Xe] 4f^{5} 6s^{2}
62	Sm	Samarium	f-block	[Xe] 4f^{6} 6s^{2}
63	Eu	Europium	f-block	[Xe] 4f^{7} 6s^{2}
64	Gd	Gadolinium	f-block	[Xe] 4f^{7} 5d^{1} 6s^{2} ^{[b]}
65	Tb	Terbium	f-block	[Xe] 4f^{9} 6s^{2}
66	Dy	Dysprosium	f-block	[Xe] 4f^{10} 6s^{2}
67	Ho	Holmium	f-block	[Xe] 4f^{11} 6s^{2}
68	Er	Erbium	f-block	[Xe] 4f^{12} 6s^{2}
69	Tm	Thulium	f-block	[Xe] 4f^{13} 6s^{2}
70	Yb	Ytterbium	f-block	[Xe] 4f^{14} 6s^{2}
71	Lu	Lutetium	d-block ^{[a]}	[Xe] 4f^{14} 5d^{1} 6s^{2}
72	Hf	Hafnium	d-block	[Xe] 4f^{14} 5d^{2} 6s^{2}
73	Ta	Tantalum	d-block	[Xe] 4f^{14} 5d^{3} 6s^{2}
74	W	Tungsten	d-block	[Xe] 4f^{14} 5d^{4} 6s^{2}
75	Re	Rhenium	d-block	[Xe] 4f^{14} 5d^{5} 6s^{2}
76	Os	Osmium	d-block	[Xe] 4f^{14} 5d^{6} 6s^{2}
77	Ir	Iridium	d-block	[Xe] 4f^{14} 5d^{7} 6s^{2}
78	Pt	Platinum	d-block	[Xe] 4f^{14} 5d^{9} 6s^{1} ^{[b]}
79	Au	Gold	d-block	[Xe] 4f^{14} 5d^{10} 6s^{1} ^{[b]}
80	Hg	Mercury	d-block	[Xe] 4f^{14} 5d^{10} 6s^{2}
81	Tl	Thallium	p-block	[Xe] 4f^{14} 5d^{10} 6s^{2} 6p^{1}
82	Pb	Lead	p-block	[Xe] 4f^{14} 5d^{10} 6s^{2} 6p^{2}
83	Bi	Bismuth	p-block	[Xe] 4f^{14} 5d^{10} 6s^{2} 6p^{3}
84	Po	Polonium	p-block	[Xe] 4f^{14} 5d^{10} 6s^{2} 6p^{4}
85	At	Astatine	p-block	[Xe] 4f^{14} 5d^{10} 6s^{2} 6p^{5}
86	Rn	Radon	p-block	[Xe] 4f^{14} 5d^{10} 6s^{2} 6p^{6}

- ^{a} In many periodic tables, the f-block is erroneously shifted one element to the right, so that lanthanum and actinium become d-block elements, and Ce–Lu and Th–Lr form the f-block, tearing the d-block into two very uneven portions. This is a holdover from early erroneous measurements of electron configurations. Lev Landau and Evgeny Lifshitz pointed out in 1948 that lutetium is not an f-block element, and since then physical, chemical, and electronic evidence has overwhelmingly supported that the f-block contains the elements La–Yb and Ac–No, as shown here and as supported by International Union of Pure and Applied Chemistry reports dating from 1988 and 2021.
- ^{b} An exception to the Madelung rule.

== s-block elements ==
=== Caesium ===
Caesium or cesium (Note: Caesium is the spelling recommended by the International Union of Pure and Applied Chemistry (IUPAC). The American Chemical Society (ACS) has used the spelling cesium since 1921, following Webster's New International Dictionary. The element was named after the Latin word caesius, meaning "bluish gray". More spelling explanation at ae/oe vs e.) is the chemical element with the symbol Cs and atomic number 55. It is a soft, silvery-gold alkali metal with a melting point of 28 °C (82 °F), which makes it one of only five elemental metals that are liquid at (or near) room temperature. (Note: Along with rubidium (39 °C [102 °F]), francium (estimated at 27 °C [81 °F]), mercury (−39 °C [−38 °F]), and gallium (30 °C [86 °F]); bromine is also liquid at room temperature (melting at −7.2 °C, 19 °F) but it is a halogen, not a metal.) Caesium is an alkali metal and has physical and chemical properties similar to those of rubidium and potassium. The metal is extremely reactive and pyrophoric, reacting with water even at−116 °C (−177 °F). It is the least electronegative element having a stable isotope, caesium-133. Caesium is mined mostly from pollucite, while the radioisotopes, especially caesium-137, a fission product, are extracted from waste produced by nuclear reactors.

Two German chemists, Robert Bunsen and Gustav Kirchhoff, discovered caesium in 1860 by the newly developed method of flame spectroscopy. The first small-scale applications for caesium have been as a "getter" in vacuum tubes and in photoelectric cells. In 1967, a specific frequency from the emission spectrum of caesium-133 was chosen to be used in the definition of the second by the International System of Units. Since then, caesium has been widely used in atomic clocks.

Since the 1990s, the largest application of the element has been as caesium formate for drilling fluids. It has a range of applications in the production of electricity, in electronics, and in chemistry. The radioactive isotope caesium-137 has a half-life of about 30 years and is used in medical applications, industrial gauges, and hydrology. Although the element is only mildly toxic, it is a hazardous material as a metal and its radioisotopes present a high health risk in case of radioactivity releases.

=== Barium ===
Barium is a chemical element with the symbol Ba and atomic number 56. It is the fifth element in Group 2, a soft silvery metallic alkaline earth metal. Barium is never found in nature in its pure form due to its reactivity with air. Its oxide is historically known as baryta but it reacts with water and carbon dioxide and is not found as a mineral. The most common naturally occurring minerals are the very insoluble barium sulfate, BaSO_{4} (barite), and barium carbonate, BaCO_{3}(witherite). Barium's name originates from Greek barys (βαρύς), meaning "heavy", describing the high density of some common barium-containing ores.

Barium has few industrial applications, but the metal has been historically used to scavenge air in vacuum tubes. Barium compounds impart a green color to flames and have been used in fireworks. Barium sulfate is used for its density, insolubility, and X-ray opacity. It is used as an insoluble heavy additive to oil well drilling mud, and in purer form, as an X-ray radiocontrast agent for imaging the human gastrointestinal tract. Soluble barium compounds are poisonous due to release of the soluble barium ion, and have been used as rodenticides. New uses for barium continue to be sought. It is a component of some "high temperature" YBCOsuperconductors, and electroceramics.

== f-block elements (lanthanides) ==
The lanthanide or lanthanoid (IUPAC nomenclature) series comprises the fifteen metallic chemical elements with atomic numbers 57 through 71, from lanthanum through lutetium. These fifteen elements, along with the chemically similar elements scandium and yttrium, are often collectively known as the rare-earth elements.

The informal chemical symbol Ln is used in general discussions of lanthanide chemistry. All but one of the lanthanides are f-block elements, corresponding to the filling of the 4f electron shell; lanthanum, a d-block element, is also generally considered to be a lanthanide due to its chemical similarities with the other fourteen. All lanthanide elements form trivalent cations, Ln^{3+}, whose chemistry is largely determined by the ionic radius, which decreases steadily from lanthanum to lutetium.

Chemical element	La	Ce	Pr	Nd	Pm	Sm	Eu	Gd	Tb	Dy	Ho	Er	Tm	Yb	Lu
Atomic number	57	58	59	60	61	62	63	64	65	66	67	68	69	70	71
Image															
Density (g/cm^{3})	6.162	6.770	6.77	7.01	7.26	7.52	5.244	7.90	8.23	8.540	8.79	9.066	9.32	6.90	9.841
Melting point (°C)	920	795	935	1024	1042	1072	826	1312	1356	1407	1461	1529	1545	824	1652
Atomic electron configuration*	5d^{1}	4f^{1}5d^{1}	4f^{3}	4f^{4}	4f^{5}	4f^{6}	4f^{7}	4f^{7}5d^{1}	4f^{9}	4f^{10}	4f^{11}	4f^{12}	4f^{13}	4f^{14}	4f^{14}5d^{1}
Ln^{3+} electron configuration*	4f^{0}	4f^{1}	4f^{2}	4f^{3}	4f^{4}	4f^{5}	4f^{6}	4f^{7}	4f^{8}	4f^{9}	4f^{10}	4f^{11}	4f^{12}	4f^{13}	4f^{14}
Ln^{3+} radius (pm)	103	102	99	98.3	97	95.8	94.7	93.8	92.3	91.2	90.1	89	88	86.8	86.1

- Between initial [Xe] and final 6s^{2} electronic shells

The lanthanide elements are the group of elements with atomic number increasing from 57 (lanthanum) to 71 (lutetium). They are termed lanthanide because the lighter elements in the series are chemically similar to lanthanum. Strictly speaking, both lanthanum and lutetium have been labeled as group 3 elements, because they both have a single valence electron in the d shell. However, both elements are often included in any general discussion of the chemistry of the lanthanide elements.

In presentations of the periodic table, the lanthanides and the actinides are customarily shown as two additional rows below the main body of the table, with placeholders or else a selected single element of each series (either lanthanum or lutetium, and either actinium or lawrencium, respectively) shown in a single cell of the main table, between barium and hafnium, and radium and rutherfordium, respectively. This convention is entirely a matter of aesthetics and formatting practicality; a rarely used wide-formatted periodic table inserts the lanthanide and actinide series in their proper places, as parts of the table's sixth and seventh rows (periods).

== d-block elements ==
=== Lutetium ===
Lutetium (/ljuːˈtiːʃiəm/ lew-TEE-shee-əm) is a chemical element with the symbol Lu and atomic number 71. It is the last element in the lanthanide series, which, along with the lanthanide contraction, explains several important properties of lutetium, such as it having the highest hardness or density among lanthanides. Unlike other lanthanides, which lie in the f-block of the periodic table, this element lies in the d-block; however, lanthanum is sometimes placed on the d-block lanthanide position. Chemically, lutetium is a typical lanthanide: its only common oxidation state is +3, seen in its oxide, halides and other compounds. In an aqueous solution, like compounds of other late lanthanides, soluble lutetium compounds form a complex with nine water molecules.

Lutetium was independently discovered in 1907 by French scientist Georges Urbain, Austrian mineralogist Baron Carl Auer von Welsbach, and American chemist Charles James. All of these men found lutetium as an impurity in the mineral ytterbia, which was previously thought to consist entirely of ytterbium. The dispute on the priority of the discovery occurred shortly after, with Urbain and von Welsbach accusing each other of publishing results influenced by the published research of the other; the naming honor went to Urbain as he published his results earlier. He chose the name lutecium for the new element but in 1949 the spelling of element 71 was changed to lutetium. In 1909, the priority was finally granted to Urbain and his names were adopted as official ones; however, the name cassiopeium (or later cassiopium) for element 71 proposed by von Welsbach was used by many German scientists until the 1950s. Like other lanthanides, lutetium is one of the elements that traditionally were included in the classification "rare earths."

Lutetium is rare and expensive; consequently, it has few specific uses. For example, a radioactive isotope lutetium-176 is used in nuclear technology to determine the age of meteorites. Lutetium usually occurs in association with the element yttrium and is sometimes used in metal alloys and as a catalyst in various chemical reactions. ^{177}Lu-DOTA-TATE is used for radionuclide therapy (see Nuclear medicine) on neuroendocrine tumours.

=== Hafnium ===
Hafnium is a chemical element with the symbol Hf and atomic number 72. A lustrous, silvery gray, tetravalent transition metal, hafnium chemically resembles zirconium and is found in zirconium minerals. Its existence was predicted by Dmitri Mendeleev in 1869. Hafnium was the penultimate stable isotope element to be discovered (rhenium was identified two years later). Hafnium is named for Hafnia, the Latin name for "Copenhagen", where it was discovered.

Hafnium is used in filaments and electrodes. Some semiconductor fabrication processes use its oxide for integrated circuits at 45 nm and smaller feature lengths. Some superalloys used for special applications contain hafnium in combination with niobium, titanium, or tungsten.

Hafnium's large neutron capture cross-section makes it a good material for neutron absorption in control rods in nuclear power plants, but at the same time requires that it be removed from the neutron-transparent corrosion-resistant zirconium alloys used in nuclear reactors.

=== Tantalum ===
Tantalum is a chemical element with the symbol Ta and atomic number 73. Previously known as tantalium, the name comes from Tantalus, a character from Greek mythology. Tantalum is a rare, hard, blue-gray, lustrous transition metal that is highly corrosion resistant. It is part of the refractory metals group, which are widely used as minor component in alloys. The chemical inertness of tantalum makes it a valuable substance for laboratory equipment and a substitute for platinum, but its main use today is in tantalum capacitors in electronic equipment such as mobile phones, DVD players, video game systems and computers. Tantalum, always together with the chemically similar niobium, occurs in the minerals tantalite, columbite and coltan (a mix of columbite and tantalite).

=== Tungsten ===
Tungsten, also known as wolfram, is a chemical element with the chemical symbol W and atomic number 74. The word tungsten comes from the Swedish language tung sten directly translatable to heavy stone, though the name is volfram in Swedish to distinguish it from Scheelite, in Swedish alternatively named tungsten.

A hard, rare metal under standard conditions when uncombined, tungsten is found naturally on Earth only in chemical compounds. It was identified as a new element in 1781, and first isolated as a metal in 1783. Its important ores include wolframite and scheelite. The free element is remarkable for its robustness, especially the fact that it has the highest melting point of all the non-alloyed metals and the second highest of all the elements after carbon. Also remarkable is its high density of 19.3 times that of water, comparable to that of uranium and gold, and much higher (about 1.7 times) than that of lead. Tungsten with minor amounts of impurities is often brittle and hard, making it difficult to work. However, very pure tungsten, though still hard, is more ductile, and can be cut with a hard-steel hacksaw.

The unalloyed elemental form is used mainly in electrical applications. Tungsten's many alloys have numerous applications, most notably in incandescent light bulb filaments, X-ray tubes (as both the filament and target), electrodes in TIG welding, and superalloys. Tungsten's hardness and high density give it military applications in penetrating projectiles. Tungsten compounds are most often used industrially as catalysts.

Tungsten is the only metal from the third transition series that is known to occur in biomolecules, where it is used in a few species of bacteria. It is the heaviest element known to be used by any living organism. Tungsten interferes with molybdenum and copper metabolism, and is somewhat toxic to animal life.

=== Rhenium ===
Rhenium is a chemical element with the symbol Re and atomic number 75. It is a silvery-white, heavy, third-row transition metal in group 7 of the periodic table. With an estimated average concentration of 1 part per billion (ppb), rhenium is one of the rarest elements in the Earth's crust. The free element has the third-highest melting point and highest boiling point of any element. Rhenium resembles manganese chemically and is obtained as a by-product of molybdenum and copper ore's extraction and refinement. Rhenium shows in its compounds a wide variety of oxidation states ranging from −1 to +7.

Discovered in 1925, rhenium was the last stable element to be discovered. It was named after the river Rhine in Europe.

Nickel-based superalloys of rhenium are used in the combustion chambers, turbine blades, and exhaust nozzles of jet engines, these alloys contain up to 6% rhenium, making jet engine construction the largest single use for the element, with the chemical industry's catalytic uses being next-most important. Because of the low availability relative to demand, rhenium is among the most expensive of metals, with an average price of approximately US$4,575 per kilogram (US$142.30 per troy ounce) as of August 2011; it is also of critical strategic military importance, for its use in high performance military jet and rocket engines.

=== Osmium ===
Osmium is a chemical element with the symbol Os and atomic number 76. It is a hard, brittle, blue-gray or blue-black transition metal in the platinum family and is the densest naturally occurring element, with a density of 22.59 g/cm^{3} (slightly greater than that of iridium and twice that of lead). It is found in nature as an alloy, mostly in platinum ores; its alloys with platinum, iridium, and other platinum group metals are employed in fountain pen tips, electrical contacts, and other applications where extreme durability and hardness are needed.

=== Iridium ===
Iridium is the chemical element with atomic number 77, and is represented by the symbol Ir. A very hard, brittle, silvery-white transition metal of the platinum family, iridium is the second-densest element (after osmium) and is the most corrosion-resistant metal, even at temperatures as high as 2000 °C. Although only certain molten salts and halogens are corrosive to solid iridium, finely divided iridium dust is much more reactive and can be flammable.

Iridium was discovered in 1803 among insoluble impurities in natural platinum. Smithson Tennant, the primary discoverer, named the iridium for the goddess Iris, personification of the rainbow, because of the striking and diverse colors of its salts. Iridium is one of the rarest elements in the Earth's crust, with annual production and consumption of only three tonnes. ^{191}Ir and ^{193}Ir are the only two naturally occurring isotopes of iridium as well as the only stable isotopes; the latter is the more abundant of the two.

The most important iridium compounds in use are the salts and acids it forms with chlorine, though iridium also forms a number of organometallic compounds used in industrial catalysis, and in research. Iridium metal is employed when high corrosion resistance at high temperatures is needed, as in high-end spark plugs, crucibles for recrystallization of semiconductors at high temperatures, and electrodes for the production of chlorine in the chloralkali process. Iridium radioisotopes are used in some radioisotope thermoelectric generators.

Iridium is found in meteorites with an abundance much higher than its average abundance in the Earth's crust. For this reason the unusually high abundance of iridium in the clay layer at the Cretaceous–Paleogene boundary gave rise to the Alvarez hypothesis that the impact of a massive extraterrestrial object caused the extinction of dinosaurs and many other species 66 million years ago. It is thought that the total amount of iridium in the planet Earth is much higher than that observed in crustal rocks, but as with other platinum group metals, the high density and tendency of iridium to bond with iron caused most iridium to descend below the crust when the planet was young and still molten.

=== Platinum ===
Platinum is a chemical element with the chemical symbol Pt and an atomic number of 78.

Its name is derived from the Spanish term platina, which is literally translated into "little silver". It is a dense, malleable, ductile, precious, gray-white transition metal.

Platinum has six naturally occurring isotopes. It is one of the rarest elements in the Earth's crust and has an average abundance of approximately 5 μg/kg. It is the least reactive metal. It occurs in some nickel and copper ores along with some native deposits, mostly in South Africa, which accounts for 80% of the world production.

As a member of the platinum group of elements, as well as of the group 10 of the periodic table of elements, platinum is generally non-reactive. It exhibits a remarkable resistance to corrosion, even at high temperatures, and as such is considered a noble metal. As a result, platinum is often found chemically uncombined as native platinum. Because it occurs naturally in the alluvial sands of various rivers, it was first used by pre-Columbian South American natives to produce artifacts. It was referenced in European writings as early as 16th century, but it was not until Antonio de Ulloa published a report on a new metal of Colombian origin in 1748 that it became investigated by scientists.

Platinum is used in catalytic converters, laboratory equipment, electrical contacts and electrodes, platinum-resistance thermometers, dentistry equipment, and jewelry. Because only a few hundred tonnes are produced annually, it is a scarce material, and is highly valuable. Being a heavy metal, it leads to health issues upon exposure to its salts, but due to its corrosion resistance, it is not as toxic as some metals. Its compounds, most notably cisplatin, are applied in chemotherapy against certain types of cancer.

=== Gold ===
Gold is a dense, soft, shiny, malleable and ductile metal. It is a chemical element with the symbol Au and atomic number 79.

Pure gold has a bright yellow color and luster traditionally considered attractive, which it maintains without oxidizing in air or water. Chemically, gold is a transition metal and a group 11 element. It is one of the least reactive chemical elements solid under standard conditions. The metal therefore occurs often in free elemental (native) form, as nuggets or grains in rocks, in veins and in alluvial deposits. Less commonly, it occurs in minerals as gold compounds, usually with tellurium.

Gold resists attacks by individual acids, but it can be dissolved by the aqua regia (nitro-hydrochloric acid), so named because it dissolves gold. Gold also dissolves in alkaline solutions of cyanide, which have been used in mining. Gold dissolves in mercury, forming amalgam alloys. Gold is insoluble in nitric acid, which dissolves silver and base metals, a property that has long been used to confirm the presence of gold in items, giving rise to the term the acid test.

Gold has been a valuable and highly sought-after precious metal for coinage, jewelry, and other arts since long before the beginning of recorded history. Gold standards have been a common basis for monetary policies throughout human history, later being supplanted by fiat currency starting in the 1930s. The last gold certificate and gold coin currencies were issued in the U.S. in 1932. In Europe, most countries left the gold standard with the start of World War I in 1914 and, with huge war debts, failed to return to gold as a medium of exchange.

A total of 165,000 tonnes of gold have been mined in human history, as of 2009. This is roughly equivalent to 5.3 billion troy ounces or, in terms of volume, about 8500 m^{3}, or a cube 20.4 m on a side. The world consumption of new gold produced is about 50% in jewelry, 40% in investments, and 10% in industry.

Besides its widespread monetary and symbolic functions, gold has many practical uses in dentistry, electronics, and other fields. Its high malleability, ductility, resistance to corrosion and most other chemical reactions, and conductivity of electricity led to many uses of gold, including electric wiring, colored-glass production and even gold leaf eating.

It has been claimed that most of the Earth's gold lies at its core, the metal's high density having made it sink there in the planet's youth. Virtually all of the gold that mankind has discovered is considered to have been deposited later by meteorites which contained the element. This supposedly explains why, in prehistory, gold appeared as nuggets on the earth's surface.

=== Mercury ===
Mercury is a chemical element with the symbol Hg and atomic number 80. It is also known as quicksilver or hydrargyrum ( < Greek "hydr-" water and "argyros" silver). A heavy, silvery d-block element, mercury is the only metal that is liquid at standard conditions for temperature and pressure; the only other element that is liquid under these conditions is bromine, though metals such as caesium, francium, gallium, and rubidium melt just above room temperature. With a freezing point of −38.83 °C and boiling point of 356.73 °C, mercury has one of the narrowest ranges of its liquid state of any metal.

Mercury occurs in deposits throughout the world mostly as cinnabar (mercuric sulfide). The red pigment vermilion is mostly obtained by reduction from cinnabar. Cinnabar is highly toxic by ingestion or inhalation of the dust. Mercury poisoning can also result from exposure to water-soluble forms of mercury (such as mercuric chloride or methylmercury), inhalation of mercury vapor, or eating seafood contaminated with mercury.

Mercury is used in thermometers, barometers, manometers, sphygmomanometers, float valves, mercury switches, and other devices though concerns about the element's toxicity have led to mercury thermometers and sphygmomanometers being largely phased out in clinical environments in favor of alcohol-filled, galinstan-filled, digital, or thermistor-based instruments. It remains in use in scientific research applications and in amalgam material for dental restoration. It is used in lighting: electricity passed through mercury vapor in a phosphor tube produces short-wave ultraviolet light which then causes the phosphor to fluoresce, making visible light.

== p-block elements ==
=== Thallium ===
Thallium is a chemical element with the symbol Tl and atomic number 81. This soft gray other metal resembles tin but discolors when exposed to air. The two chemists William Crookes and Claude-Auguste Lamy discovered thallium independently in 1861 by the newly developed method of flame spectroscopy. Both discovered the new element in residues of sulfuric acid production.

Approximately 60–70% of thallium production is used in the electronics industry, and the remainder is used in the pharmaceutical industry and in glass manufacturing. It is also used in infrared detectors. Thallium is highly toxic and was used in rat poisons and insecticides. Its use has been reduced or eliminated in many countries because of its nonselective toxicity. Because of its use for murder, thallium has gained the nicknames "The Poisoner's Poison" and "Inheritance Powder" (alongside arsenic).

=== Lead ===
Lead is a main-group element in the carbon group with the symbol Pb (from Latin: plumbum) and atomic number 82. Lead is a soft, malleable other metal. It is also counted as one of the heavy metals. Metallic lead has a bluish-white color after being freshly cut, but it soon tarnishes to a dull grayish color when exposed to air. Lead has a shiny chrome-silver luster when it is melted into a liquid.

Lead is used in building construction, lead-acid batteries, bullets and shots, weights, as part of solders, pewters, fusible alloys and as a radiation shield. Lead has the highest atomic number of all of the stable elements, although the next higher element, bismuth, has a half-life that is so long (much longer than the age of the universe) that it can be considered stable. Its four stable isotopes have 82 protons, a magic number in the nuclear shell model of atomic nuclei.

Lead, at certain exposure levels, is a poisonous substance to animals as well as for human beings. It damages the nervous system and causes brain disorders. Excessive lead also causes blood disorders in mammals. Like the element mercury, another heavy metal, lead is a neurotoxin that accumulates both in soft tissues and the bones. Lead poisoning has been documented from ancient Rome, ancient Greece, and ancient China.

=== Bismuth ===
Bismuth is a chemical element with symbol Bi and atomic number 83. Bismuth, a trivalent other metal, chemically resembles arsenic and antimony. Elemental bismuth may occur naturally uncombined, although its sulfide and oxide form important commercial ores. The free element is 86% as dense as lead. It is a brittle metal with a silvery white color when newly made, but often seen in air with a pink tinge owing to the surface oxide. Bismuth metal has been known from ancient times, although until the 18th century it was often confused with lead and tin, which each have some of bismuth's bulk physical properties. The etymology is uncertain but possibly comes from Arabic bi ismid meaning having the properties of antimony or German words weisse masse or wismuth meaning "white mass".

Bismuth is the most naturally diamagnetic of all metals, and only mercury has a lower thermal conductivity.

Bismuth has classically been considered to be the heaviest naturally occurring stable element, in terms of atomic mass. Recently, however, it has been found to be very slightly radioactive: its only primordial isotope bismuth-209 decays via alpha decay into thallium-205 with a half-life of more than a billion times the estimated age of the universe.

Bismuth compounds (accounting for about half the production of bismuth) are used in cosmetics, pigments, and a few pharmaceuticals. Bismuth has unusually low toxicity for a heavy metal. As the toxicity of lead has become more apparent in recent years, alloy uses for bismuth metal (presently about a third of bismuth production), as a replacement for lead, have become an increasing part of bismuth's commercial importance.

=== Polonium ===
Polonium is a chemical element with the symbol Po and atomic number 84, discovered in 1898 by Marie Skłodowska-Curie and Pierre Curie. A rare and highly radioactive element, polonium is chemically similar to bismuth and tellurium, and it occurs in uranium ores. Polonium has been studied for possible use in heating spacecraft. As it is unstable, all isotopes of polonium are radioactive. There is disagreement as to whether polonium is a post-transition metal or metalloid.

=== Astatine ===
Astatine is a radioactive chemical element with the symbol At and atomic number 85. It occurs on the Earth only as the result of decay of heavier elements, and decays away rapidly, so much less is known about this element than its upper neighbors in the periodic table. Earlier studies have shown this element follows periodic trends, being the heaviest known halogen, with melting and boiling points being higher than those of lighter halogens.

Until recently most of the chemical characteristics of astatine were inferred from comparison with other elements; however, important studies have already been done. The main difference between astatine and iodine is that the HAt molecule is chemically a hydride rather than a halide; however, in a fashion similar to the lighter halogens, it is known to form ionic astatides with metals. Bonds to nonmetals result in positive oxidation states, with +1 best portrayed by monohalides and their derivatives, while the higher are characterized by bond to oxygen and carbon. Attempts to synthesize astatine fluoride have been met with failure. The second longest-living astatine-211 is the only one to find a commercial use, being useful as an alpha emitter in medicine; however, only extremely small quantities are used, and in larger ones it is very hazardous, as it is intensely radioactive.

Astatine was first produced by Dale R. Corson, Kenneth Ross MacKenzie, and Emilio Segrè in the University of California, Berkeley in 1940. Three years later, it was found in nature; however, with an estimated amount of less than 28 grams (1 oz) at given time, astatine is the least abundant element in Earth's crust among non-transuranium elements. Among astatine isotopes, four (with mass numbers 215, 217, 218 and 219) are present in nature as the result of decay of heavier elements; however, the most stable astatine-210 and the industrially used astatine-211 are not.

=== Radon ===
Radon is a chemical element with symbol Rn and atomic number 86. It is a radioactive, colorless, odorless, tasteless noble gas, occurring naturally as the decay product of uranium or thorium. Its most stable isotope, ^{222}Rn, has a half-life of 3.8 days. Radon is one of the densest substances that remains a gas under normal conditions. It is also the only gas that is radioactive under normal conditions, and is considered a health hazard due to its radioactivity. Intense radioactivity also hindered chemical studies of radon and only a few compounds are known.

Radon is formed as part of the normal radioactive decay chain of uranium and thorium. Uranium and thorium have been around since the earth was formed and their most common isotope has a very long half-life (14.05 billion years). Uranium and thorium, radium, and thus radon, will continue to occur for millions of years at about the same concentrations as they do now. As the radioactive gas of radon decays, it produces new radioactive elements called radon daughters or decay products. Radon daughters are solids and stick to surfaces such as dust particles in the air. If contaminated dust is inhaled, these particles can stick to the airways of the lung and increase the risk of developing lung cancer.

Radon is responsible for the majority of the public exposure to ionizing radiation. It is often the single largest contributor to an individual's background radiation dose, and is the most variable from location to location. Radon gas from natural sources can accumulate in buildings, especially in confined areas such as attics and basements. It can also be found in some spring waters and hot springs.

Epidemiological studies have shown a clear link between breathing high concentrations of radon and incidence of lung cancer. Thus, radon is considered a significant contaminant that affects indoor air quality worldwide. According to the United States Environmental Protection Agency, radon is the second most frequent cause of lung cancer, after cigarette smoking, causing 21,000 lung cancer deaths per year in the United States. About 2,900 of these deaths occur among people who have never smoked. While radon is the second most frequent cause of lung cancer, it is the number one cause among non-smokers, according to EPA estimates.

== Biological role ==
Of the period 6 elements, only tungsten and the early lanthanides are known to have any biological role in organisms, and even then only in lower organisms (not mammals). However, gold, platinum, mercury, and some lanthanides such as gadolinium have applications as drugs.

== Toxicity ==
Most of the period 6 elements are toxic (for instance lead) and produce heavy-element poisoning. Promethium, polonium, astatine and radon are radioactive, and therefore present radioactive hazards.
