= Ytterbium(III) perchlorate =

Names
- Other names Ytterbium perchlorate

Identifiers
CAS Number	13498-08-3; 14692-14-9 octahydrate
3D model (JSmol)	Interactive image
PubChem CID	11363421
- SMILES: [Yb+3].[O-]Cl(=O)(=O)=O.[O-]Cl(=O)(=O)=O.[O-]Cl(=O)(=O)=O

Properties
Chemical formula	Yb(ClO_{4})_{3}
Molar mass	471.39 g/mol
Appearance	Colorless to white crystalline solid
Solubility in water	Soluble in water
- Except where otherwise noted, data are given for materials in their standard state (at 25 °C [77 °F], 100 kPa). Infobox references

Ytterbium(III) perchlorate is an inorganic compound of ytterbium in the +3 oxidation state and the perchlorate ion, with the formula Yb(ClO_{4})_{3}. It forms several hydrates and two structurally characterized anhydrous polymorphs.

== Preparation ==
Hydrated ytterbium(III) perchlorate can be prepared by dissolving ytterbium(III) oxide in concentrated perchloric acid and crystallizing the resulting solution.

A monohydrate, Yb(ClO_{4})_{3}·H_{2}O, can be obtained by controlled vacuum dehydration of more highly hydrated material.

Anhydrous Yb(ClO_{4})_{3} can be prepared from the monohydrate by chemical dehydration with chlorine oxide reagents. Chemical dehydration with chlorine trioxide gives the low-temperature polymorph, whereas controlled thermolysis gives the high-temperature form.

== Properties ==
=== Hydrates ===
Ytterbium(III) perchlorate forms several hydrates. Reported crystalline forms include mono-, hexa- and octahydrates.

The monohydrate is an important precursor to the anhydrous material. Its crystal structure contains coordinated perchlorate groups and water and has been studied as part of the broader rare-earth perchlorate series.

=== Anhydrous polymorphs ===
Two polymorphs of anhydrous Yb(ClO_{4})_{3} are known.

The low-temperature form crystallizes in the hexagonal crystal system, space group P6_{3}/m (No. 176), with lattice parameters a = 9.21970 Å, c = 5.53518 Å and two formula units per unit cell.

The high-temperature form crystallizes in the trigonal crystal system, space group R3c (No. 161), with a = 8.12406 Å, c = 24.0818 Å and six formula units per unit cell.

The two forms differ in the arrangement of the perchlorate groups around Yb^{3+}, but both are extended ionic/coordination solids rather than discrete molecular complexes.

=== Thermal behaviour ===
Controlled heating of the low-temperature polymorph produces the high-temperature polymorph.

Further heating causes decomposition rather than melting. The principal solid decomposition product identified in the 1998 study was ytterbium oxide chloride, Yb_{3}O_{4}Cl.

Rare-earth perchlorates generally decompose at comparatively moderate temperatures, which has led to their study as possible precursors to finely divided oxide and oxychloride materials.

=== Solution chemistry ===
In aqueous solution, Yb^{3+} interacts only weakly with perchlorate. An ion-pair species represented as YbClO_{4}^{2+} has been reported, with a small association constant, consistent with perchlorate behaving primarily as a weakly coordinating anion in water.

== Uses ==
Ytterbium(III) perchlorate can be used as a soluble source of Yb^{3+} in coordination chemistry.

For example, ytterbium perchlorate has been used as a starting material in the preparation of anionic ytterbium thiocyanate complexes used as components of low-melting metal-containing ionic liquids.

== Safety ==
Like other perchlorates, ytterbium(III) perchlorate is an oxidizing salt and should be kept away from readily oxidizable or combustible materials.
