= Ytterbium(III) arsenate =

Names
- Other names Ytterbium arsenate

Identifiers
CAS Number	15479-89-7
3D model (JSmol)	Interactive image
PubChem CID	173858182
- InChI: InChI=1S/AsH3O4.Yb/c2-1(3,4)5;/h(H3,2,3,4,5);/q;+3/p-3 Key: AUWHJHSVQUKHBG-UHFFFAOYSA-K
- SMILES: O=[As]([O-])([O-])[O-].[Yb+3]

Properties
Chemical formula	YbAsO_{4}
Molar mass	311.96 g/mol
Appearance	Colorless crystalline solid
Density	6.830 g/cm^{3}
Solubility in water	Sparingly soluble in water

Structure
Crystal structure	Tetragonal, xenotime type
Space group	I4_{1}/amd, No. 141
Lattice constant	a = 0.69712 nm, c = 0.62431 nm
Formula units (Z)	4
- Except where otherwise noted, data are given for materials in their standard state (at 25 °C [77 °F], 100 kPa). Infobox references

Ytterbium(III) arsenate is an inorganic compound of ytterbium in the +3 oxidation state and the arsenate ion, with the formula YbAsO_{4}. It is a colorless, sparingly soluble crystalline solid with the tetragonal xenotime structure type.

== Preparation ==
Ytterbium(III) arsenate can be precipitated from aqueous solutions containing ytterbium(III) and arsenate ions. For example, ytterbium(III) chloride reacts with sodium arsenate:

YbCl_{3} + Na_{3}AsO_{4} → YbAsO_{4}↓ + 3 NaCl

This method has been reported as part of systematic preparations of rare-earth arsenates.

An NBS reference sample was prepared by precipitation from an aqueous solution of arsenic pentoxide and ytterbium trichloride, followed by heating for one hour at 880 °C.

Single crystals have also been obtained unintentionally during high-temperature reactions involving Yb_{2}O_{3}, YbCl_{3} and As_{2}O_{3}. In one experiment, air entered the reaction system and oxidized arsenic(III) to arsenic(V), producing YbAsO_{4} as the main crystalline product.

== Properties ==
=== Crystal structure ===
YbAsO_{4} crystallizes in the tetragonal crystal system, space group I4_{1}/amd (No. 141), with the xenotime or zircon structure type.

At 293 K, single-crystal X-ray diffraction gives a = 6.9712(4) Å, c = 6.2431(4) Å with four formula units per unit cell and a calculated density of 6.830 g/cm^{3}.

The structure consists of chains of edge-sharing YbO_{8} coordination polyhedra linked by isolated AsO_{4} tetrahedra. Ytterbium is eight-coordinate, with two distinct Yb–O distances of approximately 2.258 and 2.391 Å, while the As–O distance is about 1.683 Å.

Earlier powder-diffraction work had already identified YbAsO_{4} as a zircon-type phase with the same space group.

=== Solubility ===
Ytterbium(III) arsenate is very sparingly soluble in water. A concentration-based solubility-product value of pK_{sp,c} = 22.72 has been reported.
