= Ytterbium(III) selenate =

Names
- Other names Ytterbium selenate

Identifiers
CAS Number	anhydrous: 20148-62-3
3D model (JSmol)	anhydrous: Interactive image; octahydrate: Interactive image
PubChem CID	anhydrous: 15242926
- InChI: InChI=1S/3H2O4Se.2Yb/c3*1-5(2,3)4;;/h3*(H2,1,2,3,4);;/q;;;2*+3/p-6 Key: LXAAECVTMYVKOP-UHFFFAOYSA-H
- SMILES: anhydrous: [O-][Se](=O)(=O)[O-].[O-][Se](=O)(=O)[O-].[O-][Se](=O)(=O)[O-].[Yb+3].[Yb+3]; octahydrate: [O-][Se](=O)(=O)[O-].[O-][Se](=O)(=O)[O-].[O-][Se](=O)(=O)[O-].[Yb+3].[Yb+3].O.O.O.O.O.O.O.O

Properties
Chemical formula	Yb_{2}(SeO_{4})_{3}
Molar mass	775.00 g/mol
Appearance	Crystalline solid
Density	3.30 g/cm^{3} (octahydrate)

Structure
Crystal structure	Monoclinic (anhydrous)
Space group	P2_{1}/n, No. 14
Lattice constant	a = 0.9220 nm, b = 0.9521 nm, c = 1.2886 nm α = 90°, β = 91.04°, γ = 90°
Formula units (Z)	4
- Except where otherwise noted, data are given for materials in their standard state (at 25 °C [77 °F], 100 kPa). Infobox references

Ytterbium(III) selenate is an inorganic compound of ytterbium and the selenate ion, with the chemical formula Yb_{2}(SeO_{4})_{3}. Both anhydrous and hydrated forms are known, including the well-characterized octahydrate Yb_{2}(SeO_{4})_{3}·8H_{2}O.

== Preparation ==
Ytterbium(III) selenate can be prepared by reaction of ytterbium(III) oxide, hydroxide or carbonate with selenic acid. For example:

Yb_{2}O_{3} + 3 H_{2}SeO_{4} → Yb_{2}(SeO_{4})_{3} + 3 H_{2}O

Crystallization from aqueous solution gives the octahydrate.

== Properties ==
=== Structure ===
Anhydrous Yb_{2}(SeO_{4})_{3} crystallizes in the monoclinic crystal system, in space group P2_{1}/n (No. 14). Its lattice parameters are a = 9.220(2) Å, b = 9.521(2) Å, c = 12.886(3) Å and β = 91.04(1)°.

The structure is built from Yb–O coordination polyhedra and SeO_{4} tetrahedra linked through shared oxygen atoms.

The octahydrate also crystallizes in the monoclinic system, but in space group C2/c. Reported lattice parameters are a = 13.704(6) Å, b = 6.831(3) Å, c = 18.507(7) Å and β = 101.90(3)°.

In the octahydrate, Yb^{3+} is eight-coordinate, with oxygen atoms supplied by selenate groups and water molecules.

=== Thermal decomposition ===
On heating, ytterbium(III) selenate octahydrate first loses its water of crystallization to form the anhydrous selenate.

Further heating causes reduction of selenium from Se(VI) to Se(IV), producing ytterbium(III) selenite as an intermediate. Continued decomposition ultimately gives ytterbium(III) oxide.

The general sequence can be represented as:

Yb_{2}(SeO_{4})_{3}·8H_{2}O → Yb_{2}(SeO_{4})_{3} → Yb_{2}(SeO_{3})_{3} → oxide–selenite intermediates → Yb_{2}O_{3}

=== Magnetic properties ===
Magnetic-susceptibility studies of Yb_{2}(SeO_{4})_{3}·8H_{2}O have been interpreted in terms of crystal-field splitting of the Yb^{3+} ground multiplet. The local environment of Yb^{3+} can be approximated as having tetragonal symmetry for magnetic modelling, although the actual crystal structure is monoclinic.
