= Ytterbium(II) oxide =

Ytterbium monoxide
Names
- IUPAC name Ytterbium(II) oxide
- Other names Ytterbium(II) oxide

Identifiers
CAS Number	25578-79-4
3D model (JSmol)	Interactive image
ChemSpider	13466869
CompTox Dashboard (EPA)	DTXSID70180267
- InChI: InChI=1S/O.Sm/q-2;+2 Key: KWTHSXCQBIRIKZ-UHFFFAOYSA-N
- SMILES: [Sm+2].[O-2]

Properties
Chemical formula	YbO
Molar mass	189.05 g/mol
Appearance	Brown solid

Structure
Crystal structure	Cubic, rock salt
Space group	Fm3̅m (No. 225)
Lattice constant	a = 4.877(5) Å
Formula units (Z)	4
- Except where otherwise noted, data are given for materials in their standard state (at 25 °C [77 °F], 100 kPa). Infobox references

Ytterbium(II) oxide is a binary inorganic compound of ytterbium and oxygen with the formula YbO. It is a metastable rare-earth monoxide containing ytterbium in the +2 oxidation state. YbO crystallizes in the cubic rock salt structure and is a narrow-gap semiconductor. Unlike the metallic monoxides of several lighter lanthanides, YbO has a closed-shell with Yb^{2+} having [Xe]4f^{14} electronic configuration.

== Preparation ==
Bulk ytterbium(II) oxide was first reliably obtained by reaction of ytterbium metal with ytterbium(III) oxide under high pressure:

Yb_{2}O_{3} + Yb → 3YbO

High-pressure synthesis stabilizes the monoxide because formation of YbO from the metal and sesquioxide is thermodynamically unfavorable at atmospheric pressure. Pure YbO has been obtained at pressures as low as approximately 1 GPa, while experiments have been carried out over roughly 1–6 GPa and 600–1400 °C. Material synthesized at high pressure can be retained metastably after decompression.

At 4 GPa and 1000 °C, the reaction produces a face-centered-cubic phase with a lattice parameter of 4.877(5) Å.

YbO can also be stabilized as a thin film without applying high external pressure. Polycrystalline YbO films have been grown on silicon by molecular beam deposition. Control of the ytterbium and oxygen fluxes is important: a Yb:O_{2} flux ratio of approximately 2:1 favors formation of the monoxide instead of Yb_{2}O_{3}.

Epitaxial YbO(111) films have similarly been grown on GaN(001) surfaces by molecular beam deposition at approximately 250 °C. Single-crystalline epitaxial films have also been produced by pulsed laser deposition on YAlO_{3} and CaF_{2} substrates.

== Properties ==
=== Crystal structure ===
Ytterbium(II) oxide crystallizes in the cubic crystal system with the rock salt structure, space group Fm3̅m (No. 225). The lattice parameter of high-pressure bulk YbO is approximately 4.877 Å. Each ytterbium atom is octahedrally surrounded by six oxygen atoms, with an equivalent coordination environment around oxygen.

The lattice constant is considerably smaller than that of EuO, consistent with the smaller ionic radius of Yb^{2+}. Thin-film samples typically have lattice parameters close to 4.87 Å.

Unlike the lighter monoxides LaO through NdO, in which the lanthanide is effectively trivalent with an additional itinerant electron, YbO is well described in the solid state as containing Yb^{2+} and O^{2−}. The ytterbium ion therefore has the closed-shell electronic configuration [Xe]4f^{14}.

=== Electronic properties ===
Ytterbium(II) oxide is a narrow-gap semiconductor. Optical measurements on epitaxial films give an indirect band gap of approximately 0.25 eV. Earlier measurements on high-pressure material gave a value of approximately 0.32 eV.

The occupied Yb 4f states lie below the conduction band, while the lowest conduction states are mainly derived from Yb 5d orbitals. Because the 4f shell of Yb^{2+} is completely filled, stoichiometric YbO lacks the localized 4f magnetic moments characteristic of many other lanthanide compounds.

The electrical conductivity can be increased substantially by introducing oxygen vacancies, which donate electrons to the 5d conduction band. In epitaxial films the room-temperature electron mobility increased with carrier concentration to approximately 13 cm^{2} V^{−1} s^{−1}.

Heavily electron-doped YbO exhibits weak antilocalization at low temperatures. This behavior was attributed to strong spin–orbit coupling associated with the heavy ytterbium atoms.

=== Magnetic properties ===
A purely ionic Yb^{2+} ion in YbO has the closed-shell 4f^{14} configuration and is therefore expected to be diamagnetic. Early measurements of high-pressure YbO instead found weak paramagnetism, which was attributed to small amounts of impurities detected by chemical analysis.

=== Behavior under pressure ===
First-principles calculations predict that YbO undergoes substantial changes in its electronic structure under compression. At ambient pressure it has a topologically trivial semiconducting band structure, but sufficient compression is predicted to cause inversion of the Yb 5d and 4f bands at the X point of the Brillouin zone.

This pressure-induced band inversion was predicted to convert YbO into a non-trivial topological semimetal, with calculations producing metallic surface states on the (001) surface. These topological properties are theoretical predictions and have not been established experimentally.

== Thin films ==
The metastability and simple rock-salt structure of YbO have led to interest in it as an epitaxial oxide. Molecular-beam-deposited films remain in the YbO phase after growth at room temperature and atmospheric pressure, despite Yb_{2}O_{3} being the thermodynamically favored bulk oxide under these conditions.

Growth on GaN was investigated because the lattice relationship between YbO and GaN permits heteroepitaxial oxide/semiconductor structures. YbO(111) deposited on GaN(001) grows by a three-dimensional mechanism and forms crystallites with lateral dimensions of approximately 50 nm.

The combination of a narrow band gap, carrier-density-dependent conductivity, relatively high electron mobility and appreciable spin–orbit coupling has led to interest in YbO films for oxide electronic and spintronic heterostructures.

== See also ==
- Ytterbium(III) oxide
- Europium(II) oxide
- Samarium monoxide
- Ytterbium sulfide
