= YbGaGe =

Names
- Other names Ytterbium Gallium Germanium

Identifiers
3D model (JSmol)	1:1:1: Interactive image
- InChI: 1:1:1: InChI=1S/Ga.Ge.Yb
- SMILES: 1:1:1: [Ga].[Ge].[Yb]

Structure
Crystal structure	MoC_{2} structure type
Space group	P6_{3}/mmc (No. 194)
Lattice constant	a = 420.56 pm, c = 1678.1 pm
- Except where otherwise noted, data are given for materials in their standard state (at 25 °C [77 °F], 100 kPa). Infobox references

YbGaGe is an alloy of ytterbium, gallium and germanium. It sparked interest because one group of researchers reported that it exhibits zero thermal expansion, while being conductive. Such materials have applications in space and other environments where low thermal expansion materials are required. However, subsequent measurements by other groups were not able to reproduce those results, but rather found expansion coefficients similar to copper.

Nevertheless, YbGaGe does show anomalous thermal expansion. Near-zero thermal expansion was observed by Booth et al. It was found that near-zero thermal expansion (NZTE) in YbGaGe is sensitive to stoichiometry and defect concentration. However, the near-zero thermal expansion mechanism remains elusive.
