= Ytterbium(III) chloride (data page) =

Chemical data page

This page provides supplementary chemical data on Ytterbium(III) chloride.

== Structure and properties data ==
Structure and properties
Standard reduction potential, E°	1.620 eV
Crystallographic constants	a = 6.73 b = 11.65 c = 6.38 β = 110.4°
Effective nuclear charge	3.290
Bond strength	1194±7 kJ/mol
Bond length	2.434 (Yb-Cl)
Bond angle	111.5° (Cl-Yb-Cl)
Magnetic susceptibility	4.4 μ_{B}

== Thermodynamic properties ==
Phase behavior
Std enthalpy change of fusionΔ_{fus}H^{~~o~~}	58.1±11.6 kJ/mol
Std entropy change of fusionΔ_{fus}S^{~~o~~}	50.3±10.1 J/(mol•K)
Std enthalpy change of atomizationΔ_{at}H^{~~o~~}	1166.5±4.3 kJ/mol
Solid properties
Std enthalpy change of formation Δ_{f}H^{~~o~~}_{solid}	−959.5±3.0 kJ/mol
Standard molar entropy S^{~~o~~}_{solid}	163.5 J/(mol•K)
Heat capacity c_{p}	101.4 J/(mol•K)
Liquid properties
Std enthalpy change of formation Δ_{f}H^{~~o~~}_{liquid}	−212.8 kJ/mol
Gas properties
Std enthalpy change of formation Δ_{f}H^{~~o~~}_{gas}	−651.1±5.0 kJ/mol

== Spectral data ==
UV-Vis
λ_{max}	268 nm
Extinction coefficient	303 M^{−1}cm^{−1}
IR
Major absorption bands	ν_{1} = 368.0 cm^{−1} ν_{2} = 178.4 cm^{−1} ν_{3} = 330.7 cm^{−1} ν_{4} = 117.8 cm^{−1}
MS
Ionization potentials from electron impact	YbCl_{3}^{+} = 10.9±0.1 eV; YbCl_{2}^{+} = 11.6±0.1 eV; YbCl^{+} = 14.3±0.1 eV

This box:
- Except where noted otherwise, data relate to Standard temperature and pressure.
- Reliability of data general note.
