= EuFOD =

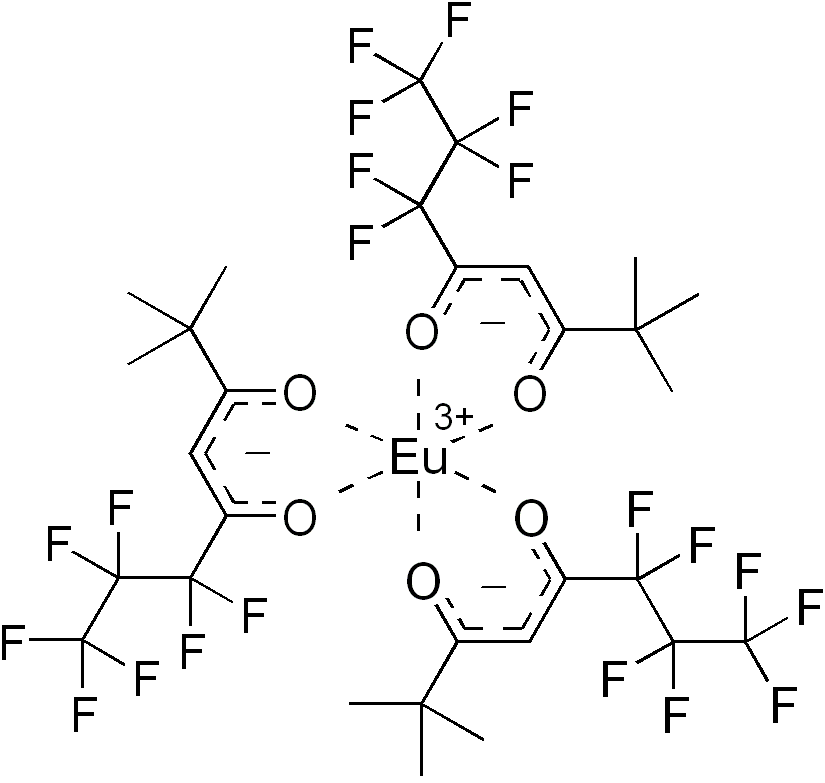

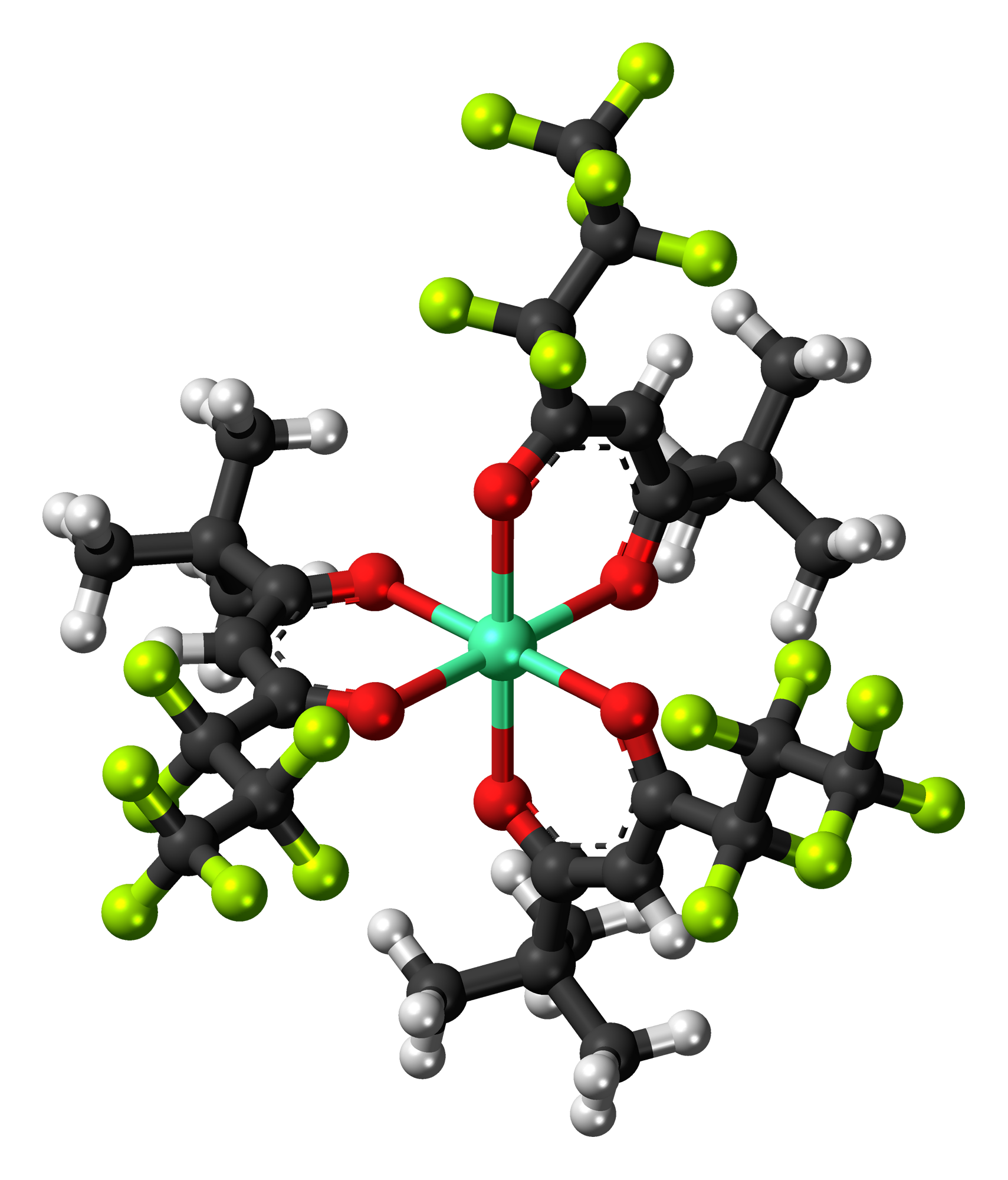

Names
- IUPAC name Tris[(3Z)-6,6,7,7,8,8,8-heptafluoro-2,2-dimethyl-5-oxooct-3-en-3-olato-κ^{2}O,O′]europium(III)
- Other names Eu(fod)_{3}; Sievers' Reagent; Tris(6,6,7,7,8,8,8-heptafluoro-2,2-dimethyl-3,5-octanedionato)europium

Identifiers
CAS Number	17631-68-4
3D model (JSmol)	Interactive image
ChemSpider	4590004
ECHA InfoCard	100.037.817
EC Number	241-616-1
PubChem CID	6000041
UNII	L4BV3KV8TE
CompTox Dashboard (EPA)	DTXSID40420521
- InChI: InChI=1S/3C10H11F7O2.Eu/c3*1-7(2,3)5(18)4-6(19)8(11,12)9(13,14)10(15,16)17;/h3*4,18H,1-3H3;/b3*5-4-; Key: UDXLMYFGTHAWDC-VNGPFPIXSA-N
- SMILES: FC(F)(F)C(F)(F)C(F)(F)C(O0)=C[C-](C(C)(C)C)O[Eu+3]012(OC(C(C)(C)C)=C[C-](C(F)(F)C(F)(F)C(F)(F)F)O1)OC(C(C)(C)C)=C[C-](C(F)(F)C(F)(F)C(F)(F)F)O2

Properties
Chemical formula	C_{30}H_{30}EuF_{21}O_{6}
Molar mass	1037.49 g/mol
Appearance	Yellow powder
Melting point	203 to 207 °C (397 to 405 °F; 476 to 480 K)
- Except where otherwise noted, data are given for materials in their standard state (at 25 °C [77 °F], 100 kPa). verify (what is ?) Infobox references

EuFOD is the chemical compound with the formula Eu(OCC(CH_{3})_{3}CHCOC_{3}F_{7})_{3}, also called Eu(fod)_{3}. This coordination compound is used primarily as a shift reagent in NMR spectroscopy. It is the premier member of the lanthanide shift reagents and was popular in the 1970s and 1980s.

== Structure and reactivity ==
Eu(fod)_{3} consists of three bidentate ligands bound to a Eu(III) center. The metal atom has an electron configuration of f^{6}. The six electrons are unpaired—each in a different singly-occupied f-orbital—which makes the molecule highly paramagnetic. In contrast, Gd(fod)_{3} with a symmetrical f^{7} configuration, does not give rise to pseudocontact shifts. The complex is a Lewis acid, being capable of expanding its coordination number of six to eight. The complex displays a particular affinity for "hard" Lewis bases, such as the oxygen atom in ethers and the nitrogen of amines. It is soluble in nonpolar solvents, even more so than related complexes of acetylacetone and hexafluoroacetylacetone.

The fod ligand is the anion of the commercially available 6,6,7,7,8,8,8-heptafluoro-2,2-dimethyl-3,5-octanedione. It is a bidentate acetylacetonate ligand prepared from heptafluorobutyric acid (PFBA). It chelates with lanthanides to form Ln(fod)_{3} for Ln = Nd, Sm, Eu, Tb, and Lu.

== Uses ==
=== NMR shift reagent ===
In its original application, Eu(fod)_{3} was used in NMR spectroscopy to gain additional chemical shift dispersion; it was the premier chemical shift reagent (CSR). As is typical in paramagnetic NMR spectroscopy, the paramagnetic compound induces an additional chemical shift in the protons near those Lewis basic sites that bind to Eu(fod)_{3}. Only small amounts of shift reagents are used, because otherwise the paramagnetism of the reagent shortens the spin-lattice relaxation times of the nuclei, which causes uncertainty broadening and loss of resolution. The availability of higher magnetic field spectrometers has lowered the demand for NMR shift reagents.

The original shift reagent was Eu(DPM)_{3}, also called Eu(thd)_{3}. Its structure is similar to EuFOD, but with tert-butyl groups in place of heptafluoropropyl substituents. That is, DPM^{−} is the conjugate base derived from dipivaloylmethane, also known as 2,2,6,6-tetramethylheptane-3,5-dione. The ligand fod^{−} is more lipophilic and by virtue of the perfluoralkyl substituent, its complexes are more Lewis acidic than those derived from DPM^{−}.

=== Lewis acid ===
Eu(fod)_{3} serves as a Lewis acid catalyst in organic synthesis including stereoselective Diels–Alder and aldol addition reactions. For example, Eu(fod)_{3} catalyzes the cyclocondensations of substituted dienes with aromatic and aliphatic aldehydes to yield dihydropyrans, with high selectivity for the endo product.

== Related reagents ==
- Eu(hfc)_{3} Eu(C_{14}F_{7}O_{2})_{3}, a shift reagent for determining optical purity
- TRISPHAT, a chiral shift reagent for cations
