= Ytterbium(III) chloride =

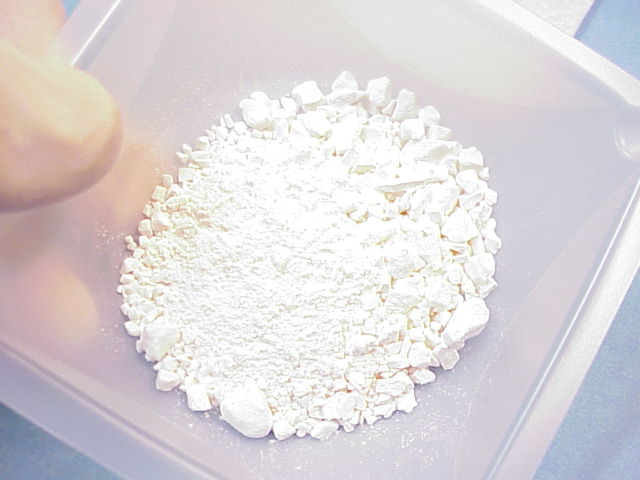
- Ytterbium(III) chloride

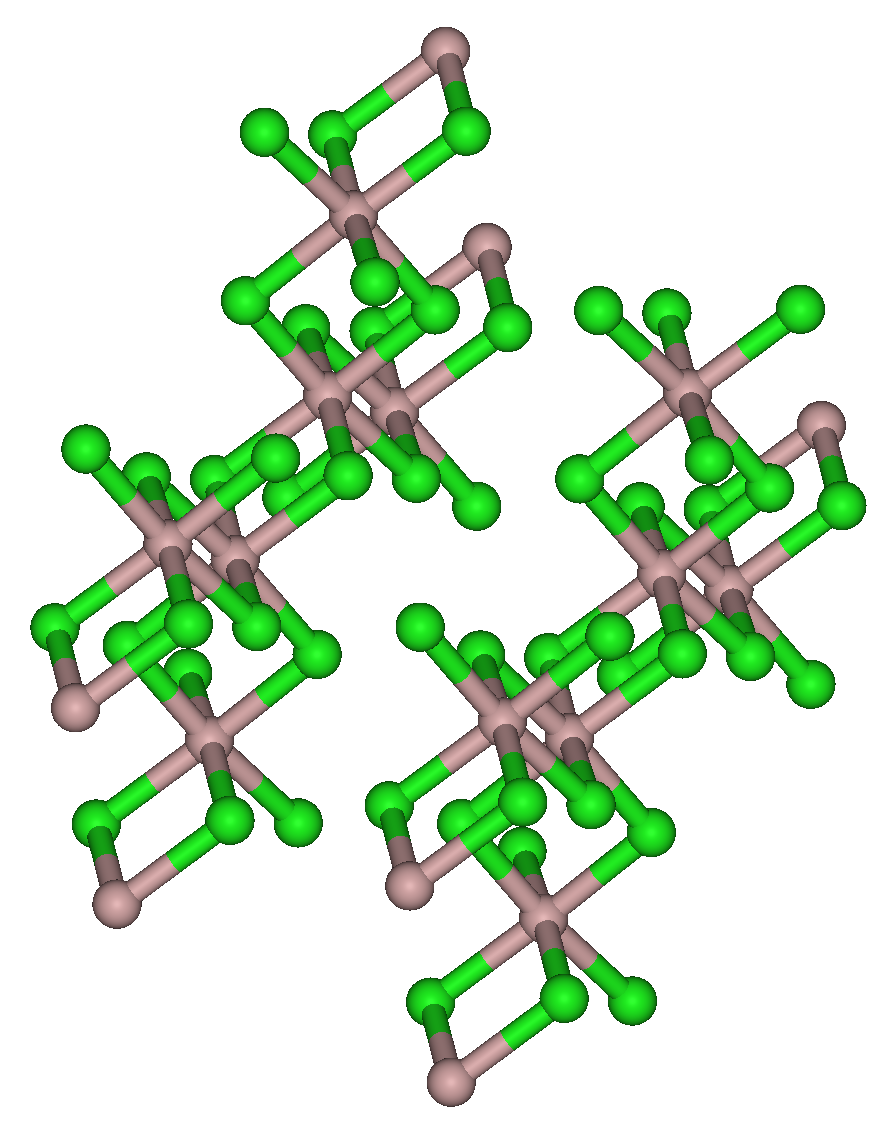

Names
- IUPAC name Ytterbium(III) chloride

Identifiers
CAS Number	10361-91-8; hydrate: 19423-87-1; 19423-82-6 (non-specific)
3D model (JSmol)	Interactive image
ChemSpider	55430
ECHA InfoCard	100.030.715
EC Number	233-800-5
PubChem CID	9860484
UNII	IO29D13DLW
CompTox Dashboard (EPA)	DTXSID0047117
- InChI: InChI=1S/3ClH.Yb/h3*1H;/q;;;+3/p-3 Key: CKLHRQNQYIJFFX-UHFFFAOYSA-K; InChI=1/3ClH.Yb/h3*1H;/q;;;+3/p-3 Key: CKLHRQNQYIJFFX-DFZHHIFOAT
- SMILES: Cl[Yb](Cl)Cl

Properties
Chemical formula	YbCl_{3}
Molar mass	279.40 g/mol
Appearance	White powder
Density	4.06 g/cm^{3} (solid)
Melting point	854 °C (1,569 °F; 1,127 K)
Boiling point	1,453 °C (2,647 °F; 1,726 K)
Solubility in water	17 g/100 mL (25 °C)

Structure
Crystal structure	Monoclinic, mS16
Space group	C12/m1, No. 12

Hazards
- GHS labelling
Pictograms	(GHS07: Exclamation mark)
Signal word	Warning
Hazard statements	H315, H319, H335
Precautionary statements	P261, P264, P264+P265, P271, P280, P302+P352, P304+P340, P305+P351+P338, P319, P321, P332+P317, P337+P317, P362+P364, P403+P233, P405, P501

Related compounds
Other anions	Ytterbium(III) oxide
Other cations	Terbium(III) chloride, Lutetium(III) chloride

Supplementary data page
- Ytterbium(III) chloride (data page)
- Except where otherwise noted, data are given for materials in their standard state (at 25 °C [77 °F], 100 kPa). verify (what is ?) Infobox references

Ytterbium(III) chloride (YbCl_{3}) is an inorganic compound. It is a paramagnetic Lewis acid, like many of the lanthanide chlorides. This gives rise to pseudocontact shifted NMR spectra, akin to NMR shift reagents. It reacts with NiCl_{2} to form a very effective catalyst for the reductive dehalogenation of aryl halides.

== Chemical properties ==
The valence electron configuration of Yb^{+3} (from YbCl_{3}) is 4f^{13}5s^{2}5p^{6}, which has crucial implications for the chemical behaviour of Yb^{+3}. Also, the size of Yb^{+3} governs its catalytic behaviour and biological applications. For example, while both Ce^{+3} and Yb^{+3} have a single unpaired f electron, Ce^{+3} is much larger than Yb^{+3} because lanthanides become much smaller with increasing effective nuclear charge as a consequence of the f electrons not being as well shielded as d electrons. This behavior is known as the lanthanide contraction. The small size of Yb^{+3} produces fast catalytic behavior and an atomic radius (0.99 Å) comparable to many biologically important ions.

The gas-phase thermodynamic properties of this chemical are difficult to determine because the chemical can disproportionate to form [YbCl_{6}]^{−3} or dimerize. The Yb_{2}Cl_{6} species was detected by electron impact (EI) mass spectrometry as (Yb_{2}Cl_{5}^{+}). Additional complications in obtaining experimental data arise from the myriad of low-lying f-d and f-f electronic transitions. Despite these issues, the thermodynamic properties of YbCl_{3} have been obtained and the C_{3V} symmetry group has been assigned based upon the four active infrared vibrations.

== Preparation ==
Anhydrous ytterbium(III) chloride can be produced by the ammonium chloride route. In the first step, ytterbium oxide is heated with ammonium chloride to produce the ammonium salt of the pentachloride:

Yb_{2}O_{3} + 10 NH_{4}Cl → 2 (NH_{4})_{2}YbCl_{5} + 6 H_{2}O + 6 NH_{3}

In the second step, the ammonium chloride salt is converted to the trichloride by heating in a vacuum at 350-400 °C:

(NH_{4})_{2}YbCl_{5} → YbCl_{3} + 2 HCl + 2 NH_{3}

== Applications in biology ==
Membrane biology has been greatly influenced by YbCl_{3}, where^{39}K^{+} and^{23}Na^{+} ion movement is critical in establishing electrochemical gradients. Nerve signaling is a fundamental aspect of life that may be probed with YbCl_{3} using NMR techniques. YbCl_{3} may also be used as a calcium ion probe, in a fashion similar to a sodium ion probe.

YbCl_{3} is also used to track digestion in animals. Certain additives to swine feed, such as probiotics, may be added to either solid feed or drinking liquids. YbCl_{3} travels with the solid food and therefore helps determine which food phase is ideal to incorporate the food additive. The YbCl_{3} concentration is quantified by inductively coupled plasma mass spectrometry to within 0.0009 μg/mL. YbCl_{3} concentration versus time yields the flow rate of solid particulates in the animal's digestion. The animal is not harmed by the YbCl_{3} since YbCl_{3} is simply excreted in fecal matter and no change in body weight, organ weight, or hematocrit levels has been observed in mice.

The catalytic nature of YbCl_{3} also has an application in DNA microarrays, or so-called DNA “chips”. YbCl_{3} led to a 50–80 fold increase in fluorescein incorporation into target DNA, which could revolutionize infectious disease detection (such as a rapid test for tuberculosis).
