= Georges Urbain =

French chemist

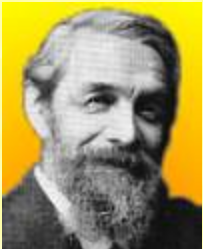
- Born: 12 April 1872; Paris, France
- Died: 5 November 1938 (aged 66); Paris, France
- Education: ESPCI Paris; Sorbonne
- Known for: discovery of Lutetium claimed discovery of Celtium
- Scientific career
- Doctoral advisor: Charles Friedel
- Doctoral students: Gaston Charlot; André Chrétien; Suzanne Veil

Georges Urbain (12 April 1872 – 5 November 1938) was a French chemist, a professor of the Sorbonne, a member of the Institut de France, and director of the Institute of Chemistry in Paris. Much of his work focused on the rare earths, isolating and separating elements such as europium and gadolinium, and studying their spectra, their magnetic properties and their atomic masses. He discovered the element lutetium (atomic number 71). He also studied the efflorescence of saline hydrates.

== Education ==
After attending the Lycée Charlemagne and Lycée Lavoisier, Urbain studied at the École supérieure de physique et de chimie industrielles de la ville de Paris (ESPCI ParisTech). He graduated as the top student in the school's ninth graduating class, in 1894. At that time he also earned his licence ès sciences physique et chimie at the Sorbonne.

Urbain served in teaching positions at the Préparateur at the École de Physique et Chimie Industrielle (1894-1895), in Charles Friedel's organic chemistry laboratory (1832-1899), in the Faculté des Science P.C.N. (1895-1898), and at the École Alsacienne (1897-1899).

He completed a thesis on Recherches sur la Séparation des Terres Rares (Research into the Separation of Rare Earth Elements) in 1899.

== Career ==
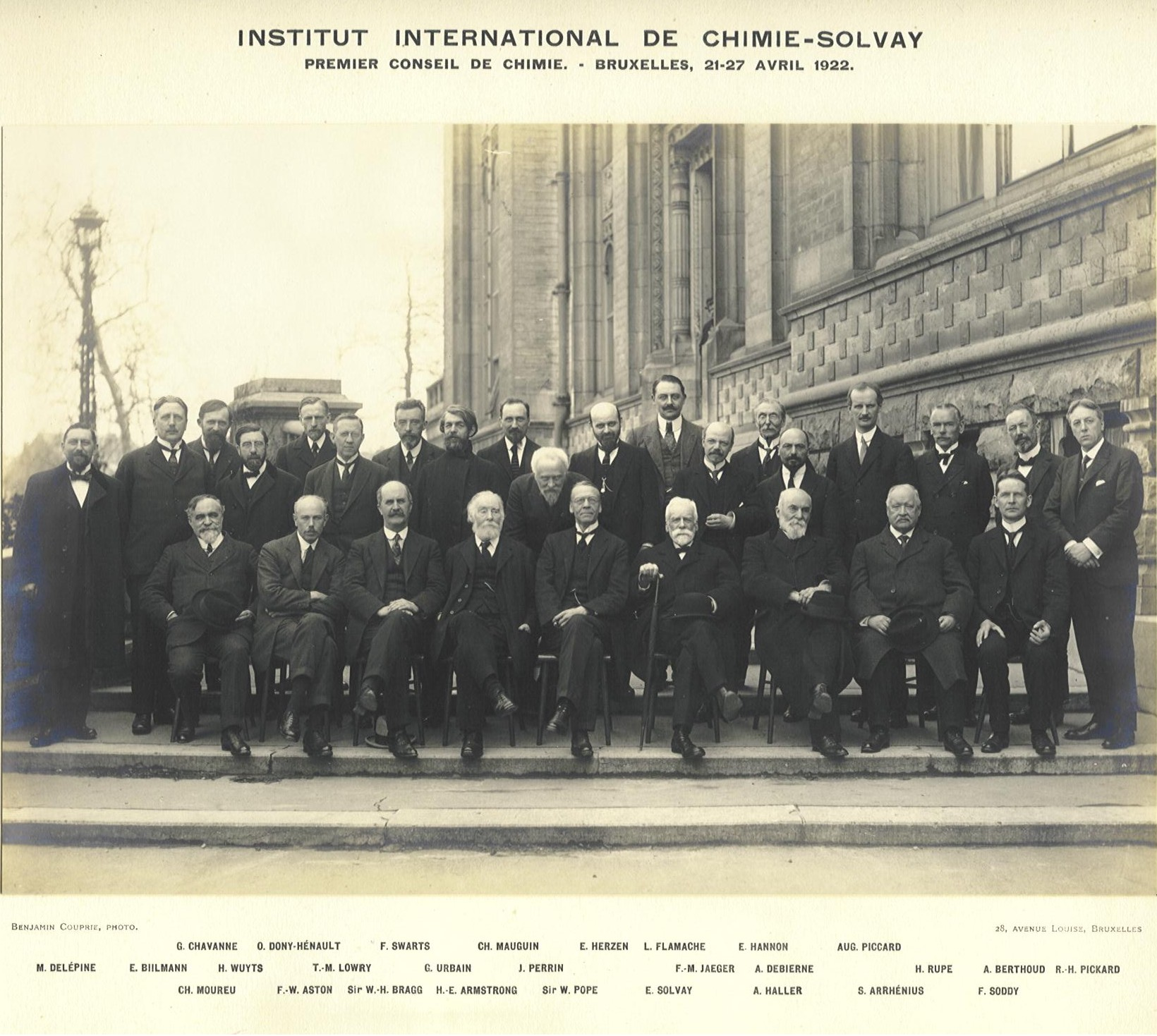
Georges Urbain, middle row, Solvay Conference, 1922

Urbain led the laboratories of the Compagnie Générale d’Electricité from 1899 to 1904. Among the topics he studied was the use of rare earth oxides to manufacture arc lamps. Next he became a teacher at the École de Physique et Chimie (1905-1906) and the Sorbonne (1906, 1908). In 1907 Urbain joined the Commission Internationale des Poids Atomiques.

During World War I Urbain served in the Ministry of War as a laboratory director and technical advisor for artillery and explosives. Following the war he taught at the École Centrale des Arts et Manufactures. In 1928 he accepted the chair of general chemistry at the Sorbonne, in addition to serving as Director of Chemistry at the Institute of Biologie. Urbain was also appointed head of the Chemistry Section of the Palais de la Découverte, director of the Chemical Treatment laboratory of Thiais, and president of the École Pratique des Hautes Etudes (2nd section).

== Elements ==
Urbain developed new and more efficient techniques for the separation of rare earths. By taking advantage of the weights of rare earths, he was able to design procedures to separate light from heavy fractions, using magnesium and bismuth nitrates. This enabled him to test and refute a number of inaccurate rare earth "discoveries" claimed by other scientists.

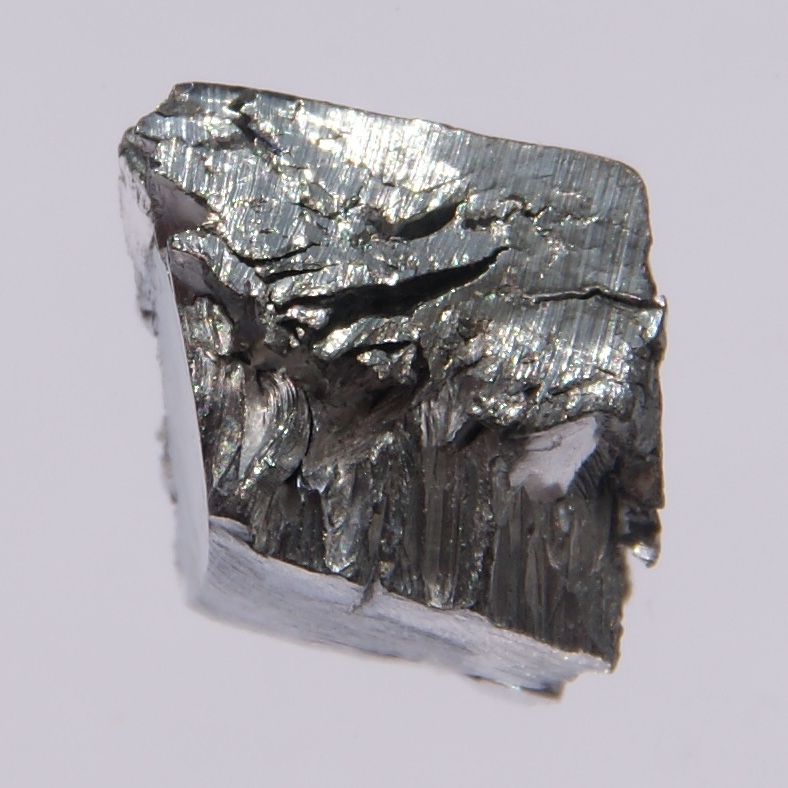
The element lutetium, which Urbain called "lutecia"

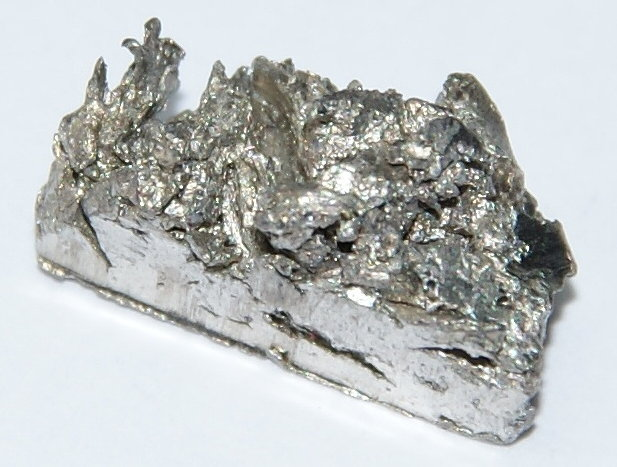
The element ytterbium, which Urbain called "neoytterbia"

Urbain discovered the element lutetium (atomic number 71) independently in 1907 when he demonstrated that Jean Charles Galissard de Marignac's ytterbia contained two substances. Through spectral analysis of both, he was able to characterize them and prove that they were distinct elements. Urbain called his two components "neoytterbia" and "lutecia".

These components of ytterbia were independently isolated around the same time by Austrian chemist Carl Auer von Welsbach and the American chemist Charles James. Urbain and Welsbach accused each other of publishing results based on the other party. The dispute was officially settled in 1909 by the Commission on Atomic Mass, which granted priority to Urbain as the first to describe the separation of lutetium from ytterbium. Urbain's "lutecia" was adapted to "lutetium". Urbain's name "neoytterbium" was temporarily adopted, but later Marignac's name was restored to the element ytterbium.

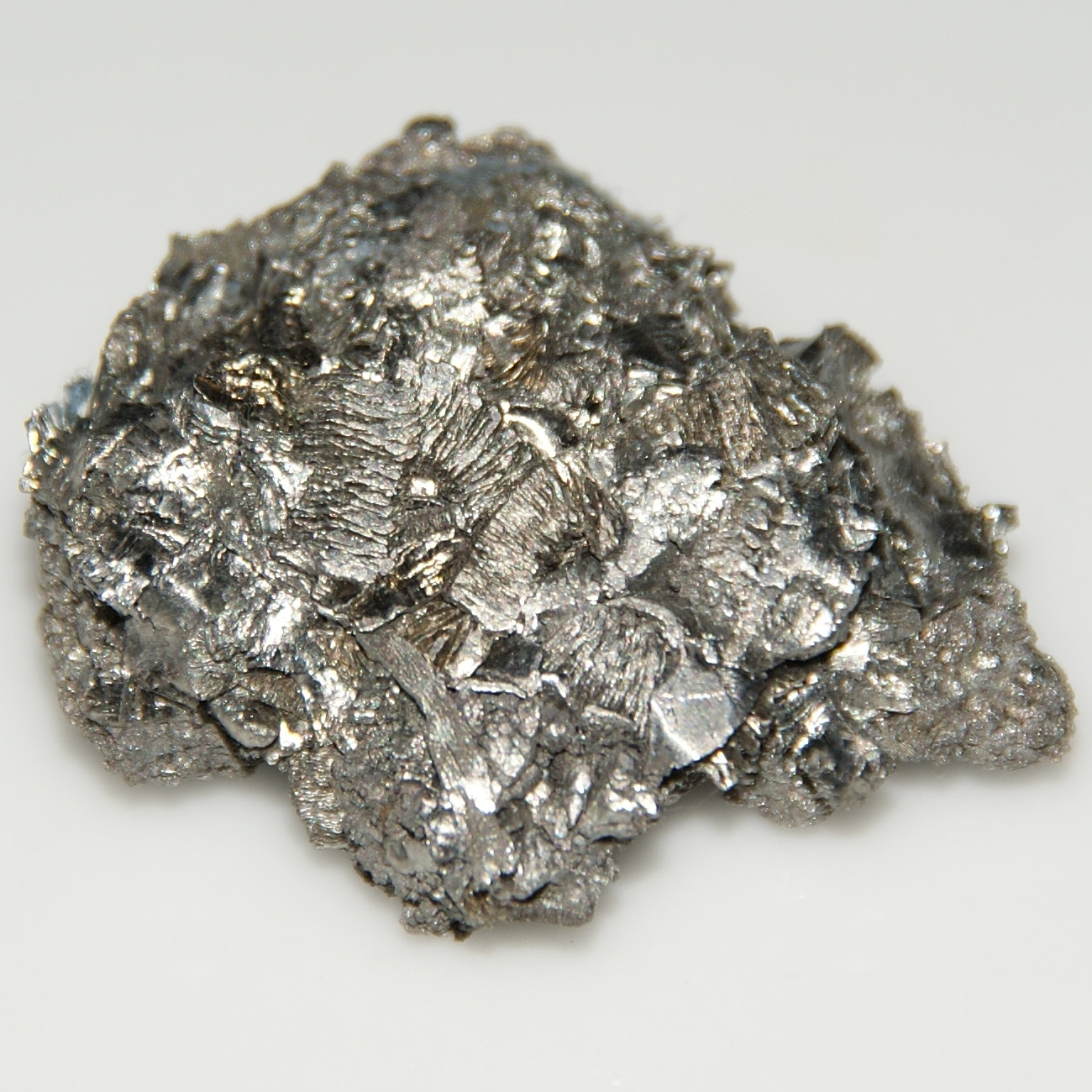
The element hafnium, detected by Urbain as "celtium"

In 1911 Urbain isolated another new element which he called "celtium", but his studies were interrupted by World War I. In 1922, he announced his new element, fully characterizing its emission spectrum, but mistakenly identifying it as a rare earth. George de Hevesy and Dirk Coster also characterized it, placing it more accurately, and called it "hafnium". A decades-long controversy over credit and naming was eventually decided in favor of hafnium. Although Urbain was right in detecting the presence of a new element, the spectra and the chemical behavior he described were not a good match to the element later isolated. In part, the controversy resulted from the different techniques used by chemists like Urbain, who favored chemical reduction techniques, and physicists who increasingly relied on new X-ray spectroscopy methods.

As of 1919, Urbain had completed an extensive study of phosphorescence spectra, and demonstrated that trace impurities could dramatically alter results. By introducing impurities into artificially prepared mixtures, he was able to duplicate the results reported by other researchers, again testing claims about possible new elements.

Urbain was also a composer and sculptor.

His son was the hydrologist and climatologist Pierre Urbain.

== Additional Sources ==
- Bram, G; Jacques, J (1997). "Georges Urbain(1872–1938) et l'unification des théories chimiques". Comptes Rendus de l'Académie des Sciences, Série IIB. 325 (1): 27–31. Bibcode:1997CRASB.325...27B. doi:10.1016/S1251-8069(97)83260-5.
