= Eu(hfc)3 =

Names
- IUPAC name Tris[(1Z)-2,2,3,3,4,4,4-heptafluoro-1-(4,7,7-trimethyl-3-oxo-2-bicyclo[2.2.1]heptanylidene)butan-1-olato-κ^{2}O,O′]europium(III)

Identifiers
CAS Number	34788-82-4
3D model (JSmol)	Interactive image
ChemSpider	4590284
ECHA InfoCard	100.047.452
EC Number	252-214-0
PubChem CID	5490150
CompTox Dashboard (EPA)	DTXSID10897307
- InChI: InChI=1S/3C14H15F7O2.Eu/c3*1-10(2)6-4-5-11(10,3)8(22)7(6)9(23)12(15,16)13(17,18)14(19,20)21;/h3*6,23H,4-5H2,1-3H3;/q;;;+3/p-3/b3*9-7-; Key: VGLKHVQPWGFXEG-NCJHBDPTSA-K
- SMILES: CC1(C2(C(=O)/C(=C(\[O-])/C(F)(F)C(F)(F)C(F)(F)F)/C1CC2)C)C.CC1(C2(C(=O)/C(=C(\[O-])/C(F)(F)C(F)(F)C(F)(F)F)/C1CC2)C)C.CC1(C2(C(=O)/C(=C(\[O-])/C(F)(F)C(F)(F)C(F)(F)F)/C1CC2)C)C.[Eu+3]

Properties
Chemical formula	C_{42}H_{42}EuF_{21}O_{6}
Molar mass	1193.722 g·mol^{−1}
Appearance	yellow solid
- Except where otherwise noted, data are given for materials in their standard state (at 25 °C [77 °F], 100 kPa). Infobox references

Eu(hfc)_{3} is the metalloorganic compound with the formula Eu(C_{14}H_{14}F_{7}O_{2})_{3}. It is a structural analogue of Eufod but contains three heptafluoropropylhydroxymethylenecamphorate anions instead of heptafluoro-tert-butyl pentanedionates. It features an octahedral molecular geometry Eu(III) center. Like Eufod, it is used as a chemical shift reagent (CSR), to increase the dispersion of signals in NMR spectra, exploiting its Lewis acidity and paramagnetism.

Both Eufod and Eu(hfc)_{3} are chiral, but unlike Eufod, Eu(hfc)_{3} exists as a single enantiomer owing to chirality of its camphor-derived ligands. Consequently, Eu(hfc)_{3} forms diastereomeric adduct with chiral Lewis bases. In this way, Eu(hfc)_{3} can be useful for determining optical purity.

== Reactions ==
Eu(hfc)_{3} forms 1:2 adducts with hard Lewis bases:

Eu(hfc)_{3} + 2 L ⇌ Eu(hfc)_{3}L_{2}

This reaction is highly reversible, as required for the complex to serve as a CSR.

== Related reagents ==
- Europium tris[3-(trifluoromethylhydroxymethylene)-(+)-camphorate] is closely related to Eu(hfc)_{3} but with CF_{3} in place of C_{3}F_{7}.
