= Samarium monoxide =

Names
- IUPAC name Samarium monoxide

Identifiers
CAS Number	12035-88-0
3D model (JSmol)	Interactive image
- InChI: InChI=1S/H2O.Sm/h1H2; Key: IPFZYNPDAIWERQ-UHFFFAOYSA-N
- SMILES: [Sm].[O]

Properties
Chemical formula	SmO
Molar mass	166.36 g/mol
Appearance	Golden-yellow solid with a metallic luster

Structure
Crystal structure	Cubic, rock salt
Space group	Fm3̅m (No. 225)
Lattice constant	a = 4.943(5) Å
Formula units (Z)	4
- Except where otherwise noted, data are given for materials in their standard state (at 25 °C [77 °F], 100 kPa). Infobox references

Samarium monoxide is a binary inorganic compound of samarium and oxygen with the formula SmO. It is a metastable rare-earth monoxide with the cubic rock salt structure. Bulk SmO is a golden-yellow metallic solid that can be prepared from samarium metal and samarium(III) oxide under high pressure and temperature.

Unlike the essentially trivalent metallic monoxides of several lighter lanthanides and the divalent semiconducting monoxides EuO and YbO, SmO is a metallic intermediate-valence compound in which the mean samarium valence lies close to +3. Epitaxial SmO films exhibit low-temperature transport behaviour characteristic of a heavy fermion system.

== Preparation ==
Bulk samarium monoxide can be prepared by reaction of samarium metal with samarium(III) oxide under high pressure:

Sm_{2}O_{3} + Sm → 3SmO

The reaction has been carried out at approximately 5 GPa and 1000 °C in a belt-type high-pressure apparatus. The product recovered after decompression is golden yellow with a metallic luster and has the cubic rock salt structure. Chemical analysis showed no major contamination by hydrogen, carbon or nitrogen.

The formation of SmO from the metal and sesquioxide is thermodynamically unfavorable at ordinary pressure, but the high-pressure conditions stabilize the denser monoxide phase sufficiently for it to be formed and recovered metastably.

SmO can also be prepared as a thin film. Partial reduction of epitaxial Sm_{2}O_{3} films on Pt(111) by annealing at approximately 1000 K under ultra-high vacuum produces well-ordered domains of rocksalt SmO(100).

Single-phase SmO(001) epitaxial films have also been grown on YAlO_{3}(110) substrates by pulsed laser deposition.

== Properties ==
=== Crystal structure ===
Samarium monoxide crystallizes in the cubic crystal system with the rock salt structure, space group Fm3̅m (No. 225). High-pressure bulk material has a lattice parameter of a = 4.943 ± 0.005 Å and contains four formula units per unit cell.

In this structure each samarium atom is octahedrally surrounded by six oxygen atoms, and each oxygen atom is correspondingly coordinated by six samarium atoms.

The lattice parameter is substantially smaller than would be expected for a compound containing entirely Sm^{2+}. Together with spectroscopic and magnetic measurements, this indicates that samarium in SmO has an intermediate valence much closer to +3 than +2.

Epitaxial SmO thin films have a somewhat larger lattice constant of about 5.02 Å, depending on epitaxial strain and growth conditions.

=== Valence and electronic properties ===
SmO is metallic. Its electronic structure differs from that expected for a simple ionic compound containing Sm^{2+} and O^{2−}. Magnetic susceptibility and X-ray absorption measurements on bulk material instead indicate an intermediate samarium valence close to +3.

X-ray photoelectron spectroscopy of epitaxial films shows contributions from both Sm^{2+} and Sm^{3+}, confirming a valence-fluctuating state. A later study using both soft- and hard-X-ray photoelectron spectroscopy estimated the mean samarium valence as approximately +2.96. The valence-band spectra exhibit a clear Fermi edge derived largely from Sm 5d states.

=== Heavy-fermion behavior ===
Epitaxial SmO films show unusual low-temperature electrical transport. Their resistivity decreases with decreasing temperature at higher temperatures, consistent with metallic conduction, but develops a local minimum at approximately 16 K before increasing again at lower temperatures. This upturn has been attributed to the dense Kondo effect arising from interactions between localized Sm 4f states and itinerant conduction electrons.

Below approximately 2 K, the resistivity follows a T^{2} dependence characteristic of a Fermi liquid. Together with the relatively large electronic contribution to the low-temperature heat capacity, these observations have been interpreted as evidence that SmO is a heavy fermion material.

The magnetic susceptibility of bulk SmO is largely temperature-independent between 1.4 and 300 K, unlike the Curie-like susceptibility of PrO and NdO. Similar behavior occurs in other intermediate-valence samarium compounds, including SmB6 and pressurized SmS.

=== Proposed topological properties ===
Electronic-structure calculations have predicted that rocksalt SmO is a three-dimensional strongly topological semimetal because of an inversion between the Sm 4f and 5d bands at the X point of the Brillouin zone.

Calculations for the (001) surface predict three Dirac cones: two nearly degenerate cones around the M̅ point and another around Γ̅. The predicted topological band inversion persists over a comparatively wide range of lattice parameters, suggesting that it should be resistant to moderate epitaxial strain.

The metallic Sm 5d states observed experimentally by photoelectron spectroscopy are consistent with the electronic structure used in these theoretical models, although the proposed topological surface states have not by themselves established SmO experimentally as a topological material.
