= Charles James (chemist) =

British-born American chemist (1880–1928)

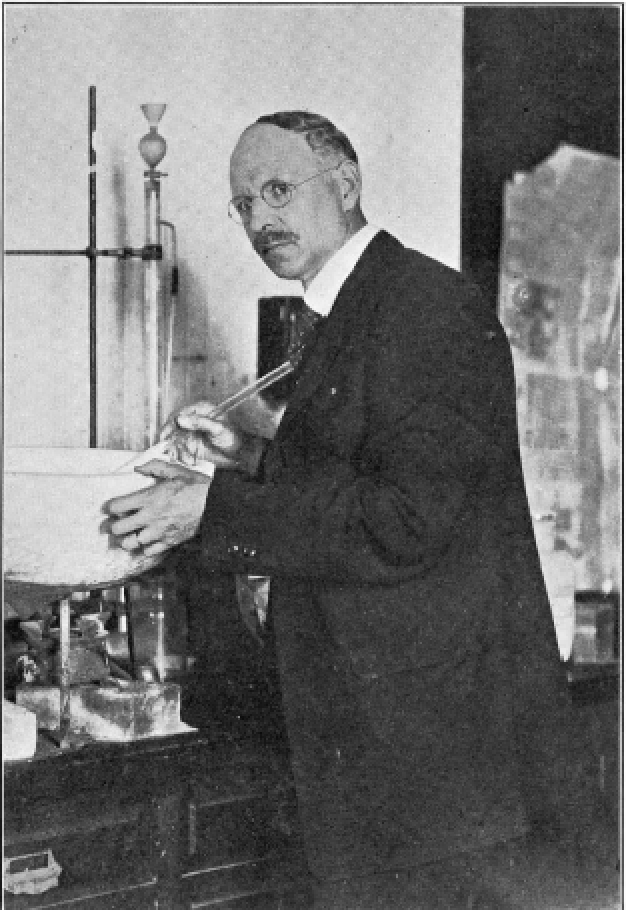
- Born: 27 April 1880; Earls Barton, Northamptonshire, England
- Died: 10 December 1928 (aged 48)
- Education: University College London
- Known for: Methods of separation, Discovery of Lutetium
- Scientific career
- Workplaces: New Hampshire College of Agriculture and the Mechanic Arts
- Doctoral advisor: William Ramsay

Charles James (27 April 1880 – 10 December 1928) was a chemist of British origin working in the United States. He became a professor and head of the chemistry department at the New Hampshire College of Agriculture and the Mechanic Arts (now the University of New Hampshire) in Durham, New Hampshire, US.

James developed the James method for the separation and identification of rare-earth elements by fractional precipitation and crystallization, and provided extracted elements to researchers worldwide. James was one of the first scientists to identify element 71, later named lutetium, and believed that he had found the final rare earth element 61, later named promethium. In 1999 the American Chemical Society recognized Charles James's work in chemical separations as a National Historic Chemical Landmark.

== Early life ==
Charles James was born on 27 April 1880 to William James and Mary Diana Shatford-James in Earls Barton near Wellingborough, Northamptonshire. His father died when he was six and he was brought up by his mother. He attended school in Wellinborough, taking classes through Cambridge University. His father's chemistry books sparked his interest in chemistry, and he built himself a home laboratory when he was 15. He also began a correspondence with renowned chemist William Ramsay, who encouraged his interest and became a life-long mentor to James.

Oxford and Cambridge did not teach chemistry at that time. His family opposed his choice of chemistry as a career, but finally gave way. In 1899, James went to University College London where he studied under William Ramsay. James won the Ramsay silver medal in 1901. He passed examinations to become an associate of the Institute of Chemistry in 1904, and a fellow in 1907.

== Career ==
In 1906, James accepted a position at the National Refining Company in West Chester, New York. Once in the United States, he was offered an assistant professorship in chemistry by Charles Parsons, at New Hampshire College of Agriculture and the Mechanic Arts in Durham, New Hampshire. Founded in 1866 by chemist Ezekiel Dimond, the school's main focus was chemistry. Parsons was a founder of the national American Chemical Society, and Parsons and James were founding members of a national chemistry fraternity: Alpha Chi Sigma.

In 1911, Parsons moved to the U.S. Bureau of Mines. James became a full professor and succeeded Parsons as head of the chemistry department at New Hampshire College.

== Research ==
James was interested in the group of elements called the rare earths, particularly the lanthanides. He published more than 60 papers in the Journal of the American Chemical Society.

=== The James Method ===
He developed specialized techniques for the fractional precipitation and crystallization of the rare earths. The James Method, using bromates and double magnesium nitrates in fractional crystallization was widely used until the 1940s when Ion Exchange methods were developed. James himself became the major producer of extracted rare earth materials, supplying elements and compounds to researchers worldwide. His collection of rare earths was sold to the National Bureau of Standards after his death. It has since been returned to the University of New Hampshire, where it is the James Collection of Rare Earth Compounds, in the Department of Chemistry.

=== Lutetium ===
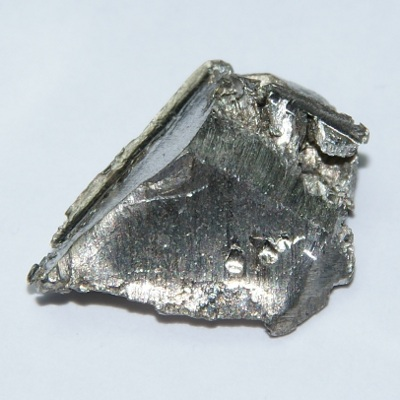
Ytterbium

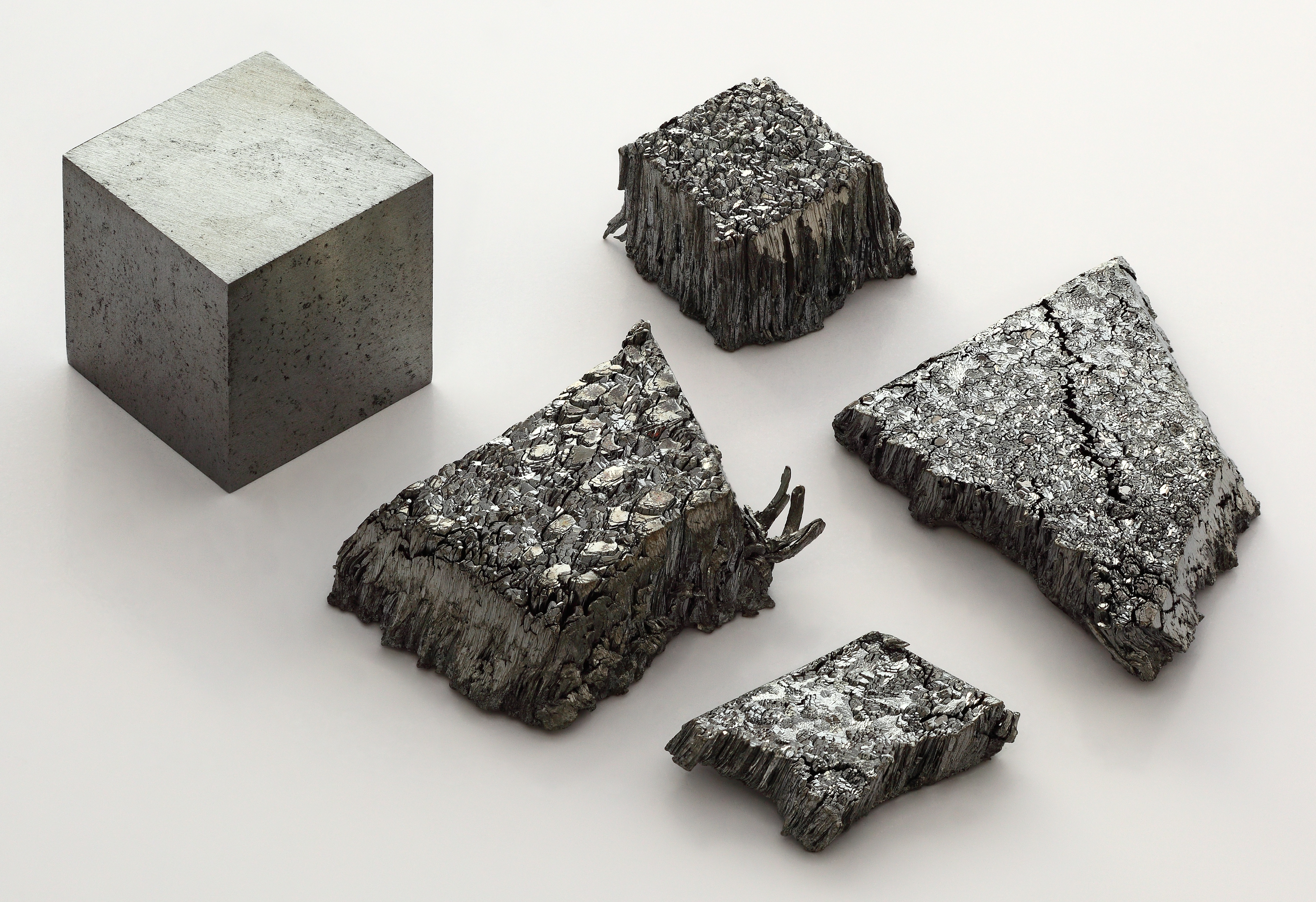
Purified lutetium

During 1906-1907, James prepared a substantial amount of highly purified lutetia, identifying it as a rare earth element that had not previously been extracted. Because he did not publish his results immediately, two other chemists published their own methods and results for the extraction of the new element before him: Georges Urbain and Carl Auer von Welsbach. All three scientists successfully separated ytterbia into the oxides of two elements, which were eventually named ytterbium and lutetium). None of these chemists were able to isolate pure lutetium, although James' separation was of very high quality.

=== Promethium ===
As early as 1913, James was involved in searching for element 61, the last of the rare earth elements. At least seven times, investigators believed that they had identified element 61. Charles James and B. Smith Hopkins from the University of Illinois both sought it. In 1926, himself close to publishing on the subject, James was asked to review a paper from Hopkins for the Journal of the American Chemical Society. James subsequently sent his own paper on element 61 to the lesser-known Proceedings of the National Academy of Sciences to avoid any possible conflict of interest. As a result it received less attention than might have been expected. It is likely that neither chemist was aware of the other's work before James reviewed Hopkins' paper. James also reviewed Hopkinsʼs book Chemistry of the Rarer Elements, saying he recommended it. Eventually it was determined that promethium, a radioactive element, does not form stable isotopes. As a result, it is extremely rare and unlikely to occur in nature, but can be formed in a nuclear reactor.

=== Thulium ===
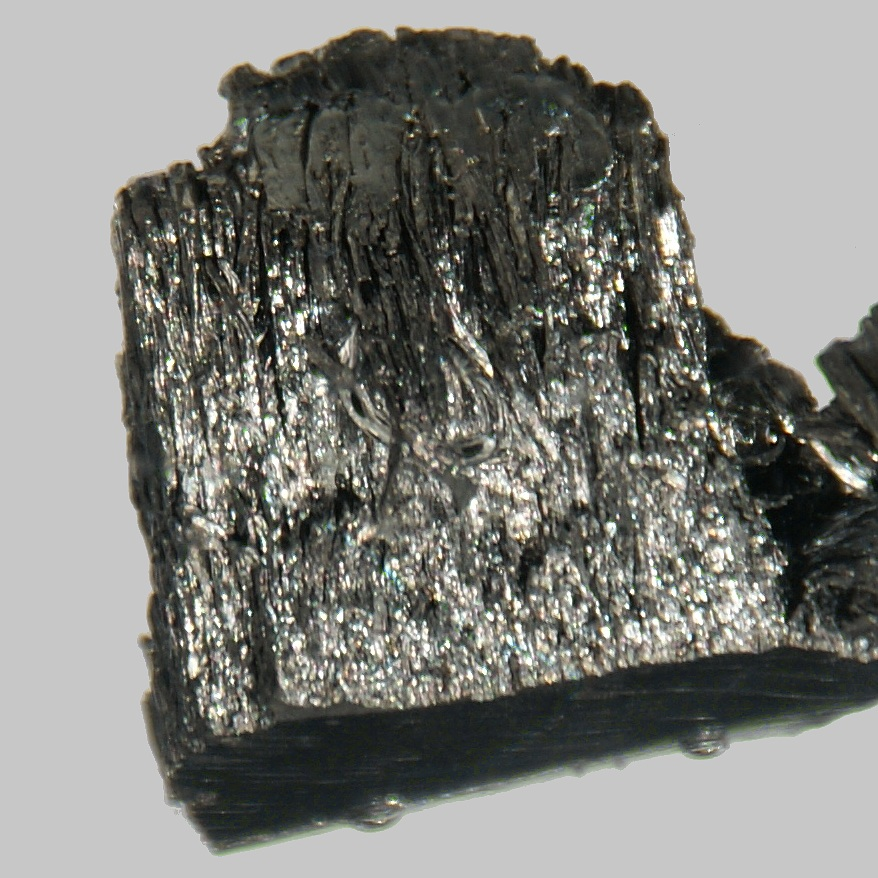
Thulium

James determined that thulium, thought to be a mixture of three substances, was really a single element. James was the first researcher to isolate nearly pure thulium. In 1911 he reported his results, having used the method he discovered for bromate fractional crystallization to do the purification. He famously needed 15,000 purification operations to establish that the material was homogeneous.

== Honors ==
- 1901, Ramsay Silver Medal
- 1912, William H. Nichols Medal, New York Section of the American Chemical Society
- 1999, Laboratory recognized as a National Historic Chemical Landmark by the American Chemical Society
- 2000, inducted into the Alpha Chi Sigma Hall of Fame

== Personal life ==
In 1915, James married Marion Templeton. Their only child, Marion James, became a historian of ancient Greece and Rome, and an art collector. In addition to his work, Charles James became an avid gardener, specializing in delphinium propagation. He also became a beekeeper, and an expert on the social life of bees.

=== Death ===
By 1928, James was terminally ill. He died on 10 December 1928. There is a legend, captured by John Greenleaf Whittier in the poem, "Telling the bees," which explains that someone must tell the bees of their master's death or they will fly away. James died in the winter, so he could not be buried in the intended cemetery plot until the spring. He was then buried in the desired plot. A day or two later a swarm of bees appeared at the grave. The bees belonged to Jesse Hepler, who lived two miles away. They had been given to him by James. No one told the James-Hepler bees of James' death, and, as in the legend, they flew away. Miraculously they flew to the grave of their former master, two miles away.
