= Ytterbium sulfide =

Ytterbium sulfide may refer to:

- Ytterbium(II) sulfide (Ytterbium monosulfide), YbS
- Ytterbium(III) sulfide (Ytterbium sesquisulfide), Yb_{2}S_{3}
