= Paramagnetic nuclear magnetic resonance spectroscopy =

Spectroscopy of paramagnetic compounds via NMR

Paramagnetic nuclear magnetic resonance spectroscopy refers to nuclear magnetic resonance (NMR) spectroscopy of paramagnetic compounds. Although most NMR measurements are conducted on diamagnetic compounds, paramagnetic samples are also amenable to analysis and give rise to special effects indicated by a wide chemical shift range and broadened signals. Paramagnetism diminishes the resolution of an NMR spectrum to the extent that coupling is rarely resolved. Nonetheless spectra of paramagnetic compounds provide insight into the bonding and structure of the sample. For example, the broadening of signals is compensated in part by the wide chemical shift range (often 200 ppm in ^{1}H NMR). Since paramagnetism leads to shorter relaxation times (T_{1}), the rate of spectral acquisition can be high.

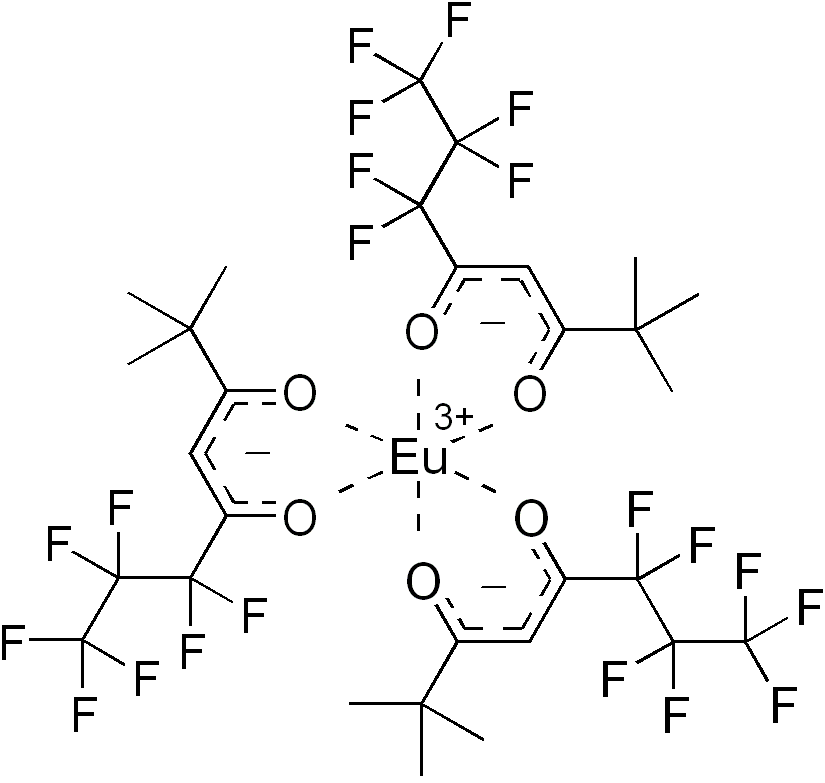
This europium complex is used as an "NMR shift reagent" because its presence shifts the NMR signals for many organic compounds.

Chemical shifts in diamagnetic compounds are described using the Ramsey equation, which describes so-called diamagnetic and paramagnetic contributions. In this equation, paramagnetic refers to excited state contributions, not to contributions from truly paramagnetic species.

== Hyperfine shift ==
The difference between the chemical shift of a given nucleus in a diamagnetic vs. a paramagnetic environment is called the hyperfine shift. In solution the isotropic hyperfine chemical shift for nickelocene is −255 ppm, which is the difference between the observed shift (ca. −260 ppm) and the shift observed for a diamagnetic analogue ferrocene (ca. 5 ppm). The hyperfine shift contains contributions from the pseudocontact (also called dipolar) and contact (also called scalar) terms. The isotropic hyperfine shift can be small or even close to zero for nuclei far away from the paramagnetic center, or in the range of several hundreds of ppm for nuclei in close proximity. Directly bound nuclei have hyperfine shifts of thousands of ppm but are usually not oberservable due to extremely fast relaxation and line broadening.

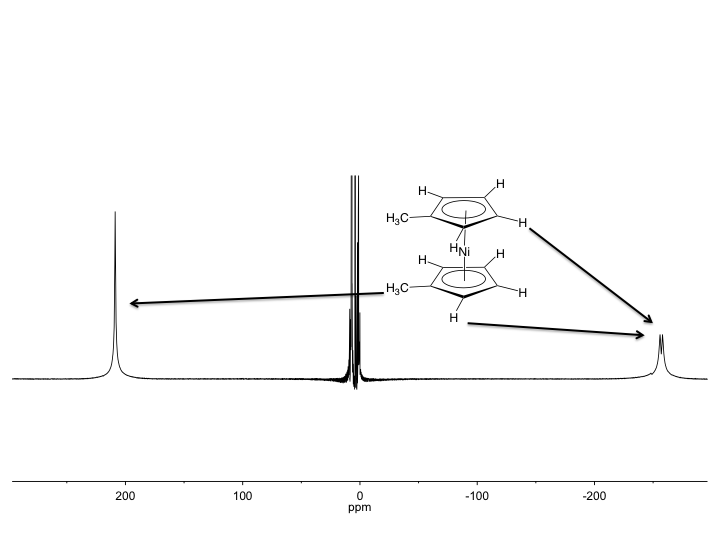
^{1}H NMR spectrum of 1,1'-dimethylnickelocene, illustrating the dramatic chemical shifts observed in some paramagnetic compounds. The sharp signals near 0 ppm are from solvent.

=== Contact vs. pseudocontact shifts ===
Hyperfine shifts result from two mechanisms, contact shifts and pseudocontact shifts. Both effects operate simultaneously but one or the other term can be dominant. Contact shifts result from spin delocalization through molecular orbitals of the molecule and from spin polarization. Pseudocontact shifts result from the magnetic anisotropy of the paramagnetic molecule. Pseudocontact shifts follow a 1/r^{3} and an angular dependence. They are large for many lanthanide complexes due to their strong magnetic anisotropy. NMR shift reagents such as EuFOD can interact in fast exchange with Lewis-basic organic compounds (such as alcohols) and are therefore able to shift the NMR signals of the diamagnetic compound in dependence of its concentration and spatial distance.

The effect of the contact term arises from transfer of unpaired spin density to the observed nucleus. This coupling, also known by EPR spectroscopists as hyperfine coupling, is in the order of MHz, as compared with the usual internuclear (J) coupling observed in conventional NMR spectra, which are in the order of a few Hz. This difference reflects the large magnetic moment of an electron (−1.00 μB), which is much greater than any nuclear magnetic moment (e.g. for ^{1}H: 1.52×10^{−3} μB). Owing to rapid spin relaxation, the electron-nuclear coupling is not observed in the NMR spectrum, so the affected nuclear resonance appears at the average of the two coupled energy states, weighted according to their spin populations. Given the magnitude of the coupling, the Boltzmann distribution of these spin states is not close to 1:1, leading to net spin polarization on the affected NMR nucleus, hence relatively large contact shifts.

The effect of the pseudocontact term arises from magnetic anisotropy of the paramagnetic center (reflected in g-anisotropy in the EPR spectrum). This anisotropy creates a magnetic field which supplements that of the instrument's magnet. The magnetic field exerts its effect with both angular and a 1/r^{3} geometric dependences.

== See also ==
- Electron paramagnetic resonance – a related technique for studying paramagnetic materials
