= Ytterbium(III) oxide =

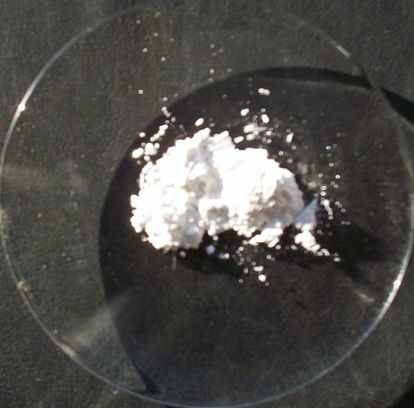
- Ytterbium(III) oxide

Names
- IUPAC name Ytterbium(III) oxide.
- Other names Ytterbia diytterbium trioxide ytterbium sesquioxide

Identifiers
CAS Number	1314-37-0
3D model (JSmol)	Interactive image
ChemSpider	3337532
ECHA InfoCard	100.013.850
EC Number	215-234-0
PubChem CID	4124403
UNII	T66CZ53RP4
CompTox Dashboard (EPA)	DTXSID20893855
- InChI: InChI=1S/3O.2Yb Key: FIXNOXLJNSSSLJ-UHFFFAOYSA-N
- SMILES: O=[Yb]O[Yb]=O

Properties
Chemical formula	Yb_{2}O_{3}
Molar mass	394.08 g/mol
Appearance	White solid.
Density	9.17 g/cm^{3}, solid.
Melting point	2,355 °C (4,271 °F; 2,628 K)
Boiling point	4,070 °C (7,360 °F; 4,340 K)
Solubility in water	Insoluble

Structure
Crystal structure	Cubic, cI80
Space group	Ia-3, No. 206
Coordination geometry	Octahedral

Thermochemistry
Std molar entropy (S^{⦵}_{298})	133.05 J/mol·K
Std enthalpy of formation (Δ_{f}H^{⦵}_{298})	−1814.600 kJ/mol
Gibbs free energy (Δ_{f}G^{⦵})	−1726.844 kJ/mol

Hazards
- GHS labelling
Pictograms	(GHS07: Exclamation mark)
Signal word	Warning
Hazard statements	H315, H319, H335
Precautionary statements	P261, P305+P351+P338
NFPA 704 (fire diamond)	1 0 1
Flash point	Non-flammable.

Related compounds
Other anions	Ytterbium(III) sulfide, Ytterbium(III) chloride
Other cations	Thulium(III) oxide Lutetium(III) oxide
- Except where otherwise noted, data are given for materials in their standard state (at 25 °C [77 °F], 100 kPa). verify (what is ?) Infobox references

Ytterbium(III) oxide is the chemical compound with the formula Yb_{2}O_{3}. It is one of the more commonly encountered compounds of ytterbium. It occurs naturally in trace amounts in the mineral gadolinite. It was first isolated from this in 1878 by Jean Charles Galissard de Marignac.

== Preparation ==
Ytterbium(III) oxide can be obtained by directly reacting ytterbium with oxygen:

4 Yb + 3 O_{2} → 2 Yb_{2}O_{3}

It can also be obtained by the thermal decomposition of ytterbium carbonate or ytterbium oxalate at temperatures around 700 °C:

Yb_{2}(CO_{3})_{3} → Yb_{2}O_{3} + 3CO_{2}
Yb_{2}(C_{2}O_{4})_{3} → Yb_{2}O_{3} + 3 CO_{2} + 3CO

== Properties ==
=== Chemical ===
Ytterbium(III) oxide is a white powder. It reacts with carbon tetrachloride or hot hydrochloric acid to form ytterbium(III) chloride:

2 Yb_{2}O_{3} + 3 CCl_{4} → 4 YbCl_{3} + 3 CO_{2}
Yb_{2}O_{3} + 6 HCl → 2 YbCl_{3} + 3 H_{2}O

=== Physical ===
Like the other trivalent oxides of the heavier lanthanides, ytterbium(III) oxide has the "rare-earth C-type sesquioxide" structure which is related to the fluorite structure with one quarter of the anions removed, leading to ytterbium atoms in two different six coordinate (non-octahedral) environments.

== Uses ==
- Colorant for glasses and enamels
- Dopant for garnet crystals in lasers
- Optical fibers
- Additive for special alloys and dielectric ceramic materials

== See also ==
- Active laser medium
