= Geochronometry =

Branch of stratigraphy

Geochronometry is a branch of stratigraphy aimed at the quantitative measurement of geologic time. It is considered a branch of geochronology.

== Brief history ==
The measurement of geologic time is a long-standing problem of geology. When geology was at its beginnings, a major problem for stratigraphers was to find a reliable method for the measurement of time. In the eighteenth century, and during most of the nineteenth century, the ideas on the geologic time were indeed so controversial that the estimates for the age of the Earth encompassed the whole range from ca. 6000 years to 300 million years. The longer estimate came from Charles Darwin, who probably went closer to the truth because he had clear in mind that the evolution of life must have required a lot of time to take place. The current estimate of the age of the Earth is ca. 4500 million years. The solution of the dating problem arrived only with the discovery that some natural elements undergo a continuous decay. This led to the first radiometric datings by Boltwood and Strutt. Today, the determination of the age of the Earth is not a primary scope of geochronometry anymore, and most efforts are rather aimed at obtaining increasingly precise radiometric datings. At the same time, other methods for the measurement of time were developed, so the quantification of geologic time can now be endeavored with a variety of approaches.

== Radiometric dating ==
All methods based on the radioactive decay belong to this category. The principle at the base of radiometric dating is that natural unstable isotopes, called 'parent isotopes', decay to some isotope which is instead stable, called the 'daughter isotope'.

Under the assumptions that:

(1) the initial amount of parent and daughter isotopes can be estimated, and

(2) after the geologic material formed, parent and daughter isotopes did not escape the system, the age of the material can be obtained from the measurement of isotope concentrations, through the laws of radioactive decay. Methods of this kind are usually identified with the names of the parent/daughter elements. The radiometric methods under this category are:

- U/Pb
- U/Th
- K-Ar (and Ar-Ar)
- Rb/Sr
- Sm/Nd
- Re/Os
- Lu/Hf

Each of these methods perform better in different time ranges and has different limitations. However, uranium–lead dating on zircon and Argon-argon dating on sanidine and hornblende are the two single methods that achieve today the best results.

Other methods of radiometric dating are also available, that are based on slightly or largely different principles, but always rely on the phenomenon of radioactive decay. These alternative radiometric methods are:

- 14C, or radiocarbon
- Fission track dating
- Optical luminescence dating and Thermoluminescence dating
- Cosmic ray exposure dating

These methods, especially radiocarbon, are particularly reliable for recent samples, but are much less accurate for deep geologic time. More specifically, radiocarbon becomes unreliable already for samples >50000 years old.

== Incremental dating ==
These methods are based on the building of incremental chronologies from a point of known age, which is usually the present. When a chronology is not tied to such a known age point, it is called a floating chronology. Incremental dating methods include:

- Dendrochronology
- Lichenometry
- Sclerochronology in mollusc shells or coral skeletons
- Varve chronology (e.g., in lake sediments or ice cores)
- Lamina counting in speleothems
- Cyclostratigraphy based on Milankovitch cycles

== Geologic time scale ==
A major achievement of geochronometry is the documentation of geologic time, as represented in geologic time scales. A geologic time scale is a scheme that integrates the geochronologic subdivisions of geologic time and their absolute ages and durations. The latest version of the geologic time scale was published in 2004, and includes a comparison of present and past time scales. The greater efforts of geochronometry today are aimed at retrieving accurate ages of major events in the Earth's history and of stage/age boundaries.

== See also ==
- Biostratigraphy
- Chronostratigraphy
- Hydrology
- Palynology
