= Lutetium aluminium garnet =

Inorganic compound

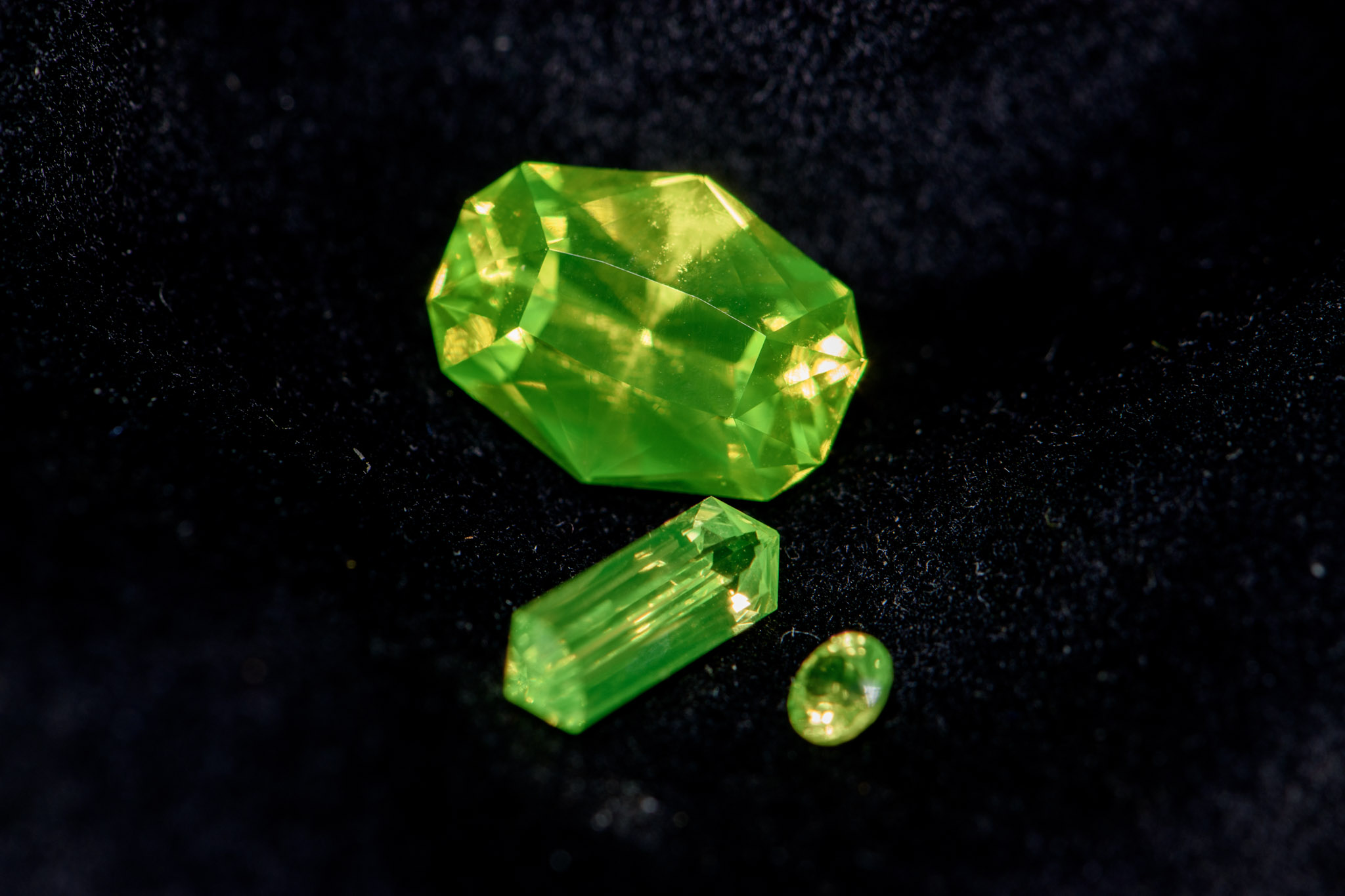
Samples of Ce:LuAG, each faceted as a gemstone for use in jewelry. While LuAG is not grown specifically for the gem trade, industrial scrap is sometimes repurposed into gemstones.

Lutetium aluminum garnet (commonly abbreviated LuAG, molecular formula Lu_{3}Al_{5}O_{12}) is an inorganic compound with a unique crystal structure primarily known for its use in high-efficiency laser devices. LuAG is also useful in the synthesis of transparent ceramics.

LuAG is a dopable scintillating crystal that will demonstrate luminescence after excitation. Scintillating crystals are selected for high structural perfection, high density and high effective atomic number. LuAG is particularly favored over other crystals for its high density and thermal conductivity. LuAG has a relatively small lattice constant in comparison to the other rare-earth garnets, which results in a higher density producing a crystal field with narrower linewidths and greater energy level splitting in absorption and emission. These properties make it an excellent host for active ions such as Yb, Tm, Er, and Ho employed in diode-pumped solid-state lasers.

The density of the lutetium crystal is greater than that of other metals, such as yttrium, meaning that the crystal properties do not change with the addition of dopant ions. It can be especially useful for high energy particle detection and quantification on account of its density and thermal stability. This high melting temperature, in addition to the lack of availability of lutetium has made this crystal less commonly used than its fellow garnets, despite its favorable physical properties.

== Physical properties and structure ==
Lutetium aluminum garnet, with the molecular formula Lu_{3}Al_{5}O_{12,} has a complex cubic crystal structure. The unit cell contains 24 lutetium atoms in c sites, 96 oxygen atoms in h sites, and aluminum in 16 a sites and 24 d sites.

The mass of the lutetium ion is closer to laser-active lanthanides which are used for doping, meaning that the thermal conductivity is not altered as it would be in other garnet structures at higher doping levels. Additionally, the crystal radius of lutetium limits the alterations observed in the crystal structure with doping present.

Physical properties of LuAG
Chemical formula	Lu_{3}Al_{5}O_{12}
Crystal structure	Cubic
Molecular weight	851.81 g/mol
Density	6.71 g/cm^{3}
Melting Point	1980 ˚C
Specific Heat	0.419 J/gK

== Synthesis ==
Lutetium aluminum garnet is an artificial crystal that can be grown using a technique developed approximately a century ago, the Czochralski growth process. This method allows for the formation of single-crystal cylinders of various scintillators. The method is utilized for the growth of semiconductors, oxides, fluorides, and halide crystals in addition to metal crystals.

LuAG's growth process is relatively simple due to its crystallographic structure and physiochemical properties. Because of the materials' thermal stability, it requires an apparatus to manage a high power supply and temperatures of up to 2500 ˚C.

Hydrothermal growth of garnets has been recorded since the 1960s and has now been demonstrated for LuAG as an alternative technique to the traditional melt method employed in the past. This method enables crystals to be grown at lower temperatures, limiting the thermally induced defects which result in expanses of optically useless crystal.

This method was employed without the use of LuAG seed on account of its unavailability and cost. Instead, the growth was performed using yttrium aluminium garnet crystals with a minimal lattice mismatch of 0.6%. The growth was done using powdered lutetium(III) oxide and crushed sapphire feedstock with 2M potassium bicarbonate mineralizer with a thermal gradient of 610 - 640 ˚C.

== Applications ==
The lasing process involving aluminum garnet crystals is carried out by the dopant atoms, usually rare-earth metals, which take the place of a few atoms of the original metal in the crystal structure (in this case lutetium). The role of the unsubstituted atoms of lutetium, aluminum, and oxygen function as support for the dopant ions.

Like yttrium aluminum garnet, lutetium aluminum garnet may be cut into gemstones for use in jewelry. LuAG gemstones are generally sourced from scrap material originally intended for laser or scintillator use, resulting in strongly fluorescent gemstones.

== See also ==
- Gadolinium gallium garnet
- Gadolinium yttrium garnet
- Yttrium aluminium garnet
- Yttrium iron garnet
