= Lutetium perchlorate =

Names
- Other names Lutetium(III) perchlorate

Identifiers
CAS Number	14646-29-8; octahydrate: 14692-13-8
3D model (JSmol)	Interactive image; octahydrate: Interactive image
ChemSpider	20100840
ECHA InfoCard	100.035.164
EC Number	238-697-0
PubChem CID	15335707
- InChI: InChI=1S/3ClHO4.Lu/c3*2-1(3,4)5;/h3*(H,2,3,4,5);/q;;;+3/p-3 Key: ZPKRKRVQNBTMND-UHFFFAOYSA-K
- SMILES: [Lu+3].[O-]Cl(=O)(=O)=O.[O-]Cl(=O)(=O)=O.[O-]Cl(=O)(=O)=O; octahydrate: [Lu+3].[O-]Cl(=O)(=O)=O.[O-]Cl(=O)(=O)=O.[O-]Cl(=O)(=O)=O.O.O.O.O.O.O.O.O

Properties
Chemical formula	Lu(ClO_{4})_{3}
Molar mass	473.31 g/mol
Appearance	Colorless crystalline solid (hydrates)
Solubility in water	Soluble in water

Structure
Crystal structure	Trigonal (anhydrous)
Space group	R3c, No. 161
Lattice constant	a = 0.811559 nm, c = 2.40047 nm
Formula units (Z)	6
- Except where otherwise noted, data are given for materials in their standard state (at 25 °C [77 °F], 100 kPa). Infobox references

Lutetium perchlorate is an inorganic compound of lutetium and the perchlorate ion, with the formula Lu(ClO_{4})_{3}. It is known in anhydrous form and as several hydrates, including the tri-, hexa- and octahydrates.

== Preparation ==
Hydrated lutetium perchlorate can be prepared by dissolving lutetium(III) oxide in perchloric acid and crystallizing the resulting solution.

More highly hydrated material can be dehydrated under controlled conditions. Single crystals of the trihydrate, Lu(ClO_{4})_{3}·3H_{2}O, have been obtained by slowly dehydrating the hexahydrate at 140 °C under flowing argon.

Anhydrous Lu(ClO_{4})_{3} can be produced by dehydrating hydrated lutetium perchlorate using chlorine oxide dehydrating agents under reduced pressure.

== Properties ==
=== Anhydrous structure ===
Anhydrous Lu(ClO_{4})_{3} crystallizes in the trigonal crystal system, space group R3c (No. 161), with six formula units per unit cell.

The lattice parameters are a = 8.11559(4) Å, c = 24.0047(1) Å.

Each Lu^{3+} ion is surrounded by nine oxygen atoms belonging to six different perchlorate groups. The LuO_{9} coordination polyhedron is approximately a tricapped trigonal antiprism.

The perchlorate groups act as both bridging and chelating ligands. Their linkage produces infinite layers of lutetium atoms, with further perchlorate bridges between the layers generating a three-dimensional structure containing channels.

The smaller late-lanthanide ion causes Lu(ClO_{4})_{3} to adopt a different structure from the hexagonal P6_{3}/m form characteristic of many of the larger anhydrous lanthanide perchlorates.

=== Hydrates ===
Several hydrates have been reported, including Lu(ClO_{4})_{3}·3H_{2}O, ·6H_{2}O and ·8H_{2}O.

The trihydrate crystallizes in the triclinic crystal system, space group P1, with two formula units per unit cell. Its lattice parameters are a = 7.503(1) Å, b = 8.384(1) Å, c = 10.546(2) Å, α = 79.77(2)°, β = 79.18(2)°, γ = 63.83(2)°.

In the trihydrate, Lu^{3+} is eight-coordinate. Five of the coordinating oxygen atoms originate from perchlorate groups and three from water molecules.

The LuO_{8} polyhedra and perchlorate tetrahedra are linked into one-dimensional chains. These chains are connected to one another primarily through hydrogen bonds involving the coordinated water molecules.

Earlier studies also report a hexahydrate and octahydrate.

=== Thermal behaviour ===
Hydrated lutetium perchlorate progressively loses water on heating, with the trihydrate obtainable as an intermediate during dehydration of the hexahydrate.

At higher temperatures the perchlorate does not boil unchanged but decomposes. Older thermal studies report decomposition beginning in the region of approximately 260 °C.

== Coordination chemistry ==
Lutetium perchlorate is used as a soluble source of Lu^{3+} in nonaqueous coordination chemistry.

Complexes with donor solvents are known; for example, a dimethyl sulfoxide solvate with approximate composition Lu(ClO_{4})_{3}·7DMSO has been reported.

== Safety ==
Lutetium perchlorate is an oxidizing perchlorate salt and should be kept away from readily oxidizable or combustible materials.
