= C4H11NO2 =

The molecular formula C_{4}H_{11}NO_{2} (molar mass: 105.14 g/mol) may refer to:

- Ammonium butyrate
- Ammonium isobutyrate
- Diethanolamine
