= Lutetium oxalate =

Names
- Other names Lutetium(III) oxalate

Identifiers
CAS Number	3426-45-7; hexahydrate: 51373-64-9
3D model (JSmol)	Interactive image; hexahydrate: Interactive image
ChemSpider	144759; hexahydrate: 57495635
EC Number	222-328-5
PubChem CID	165119; hexahydrate: 71366919
CompTox Dashboard (EPA)	DTXSID30955812; hexahydrate: DTXSID50790262
- InChI: InChI=1S/3C2H2O4.2Lu/c3*3-1(4)2(5)6;;/h3*(H,3,4)(H,5,6);;/q;;;2*+3/p-6 Key: WBXXVIQNIMIONY-UHFFFAOYSA-H; hexahydrate: InChI=1S/3C2H2O4.2Lu.6H2O/c3*3-1(4)2(5)6;;;;;;;;/h3*(H,3,4)(H,5,6);;;6*1H2/q;;;2*+3;;;;;;/p-6 Key: GGCDTIOZNNDYOG-UHFFFAOYSA-H
- SMILES: [Lu+3].[Lu+3].[O-]C(=O)C(=O)[O-].[O-]C(=O)C(=O)[O-].[O-]C(=O)C(=O)[O-]; hexahydrate: C(=O)(C(=O)[O-])[O-].C(=O)(C(=O)[O-])[O-].C(=O)(C(=O)[O-])[O-].O.O.O.O.O.O.[Lu+3].[Lu+3]

Properties
Chemical formula	Lu_{2}(C_{2}O_{4})_{3}
Molar mass	613.99 g/mol
Appearance	Colorless to white crystalline solid
Solubility in water	Sparingly soluble in water

Hazards
- GHS labelling
Pictograms	(GHS07: Exclamation mark)
Signal word	Warning
Hazard statements	H302, H312
Precautionary statements	P264, P270, P280, P301+P317, P302+P352, P317, P321, P330, P362+P364, P501
- Except where otherwise noted, data are given for materials in their standard state (at 25 °C [77 °F], 100 kPa). Infobox references

Lutetium oxalate is an inorganic compound of lutetium and the oxalate ion, with the formula Lu_{2}(C_{2}O_{4})_{3}. It forms hydrated phases and, like other heavy-lanthanide oxalates, is normally obtained as a hexahydrate. On heating it decomposes through carbonate-containing intermediates to lutetium(III) oxide.

== Preparation ==
Hydrated lutetium oxalate can be prepared by precipitation of a soluble lutetium(III) salt with oxalic acid or a soluble oxalate.

A modern single-crystal synthesis uses homogeneous precipitation by slow acid-catalyzed hydrolysis of oxamic acid, which allows much larger crystals to form than conventional direct precipitation.

== Properties ==
=== Hydrates and crystal structure ===
Lutetium oxalate belongs to the heavy-lanthanide oxalate structure family. Under mild aqueous preparation conditions, the principal crystalline hydrate has the composition

[Lu_{2}(C_{2}O_{4})_{3}(H_{2}O)_{4}]·2H_{2}O,

corresponding to the conventional formula Lu_{2}(C_{2}O_{4})_{3}·6H_{2}O.

The hexahydrate crystallizes in the triclinic space group P1̅ (No. 2), the structure adopted by the four heaviest lanthanide oxalates, Er through Lu.

The crystal structure consists of two-dimensional honeycomb-like coordination-polymer layers. Each Lu^{3+} ion is eight-coordinate, bonded to six oxygen atoms from three oxalate ligands and two oxygen atoms from coordinated water molecules. Two additional water molecules occupy cavities within the hydrogen-bonded layered structure.

The coordination geometry around lutetium can be described as a distorted bicapped trigonal prism.

Earlier literature reported other hydration numbers, including dihydrate and decahydrate compositions. Modern structural work has shown that the apparent hydration number of lanthanide oxalates can depend strongly on preparation, drying and storage conditions; for heavy lanthanides such as lutetium, the hexahydrate is the characteristic ambient-pressure crystalline form.

=== Exfoliation ===
The layered structure of hydrated lutetium oxalate allows it to be delaminated in ethanol. Sonication or refluxing in approximately 96% ethanol produces colloidal dispersions containing very thin oxalate nanosheets, in some cases approaching single-layer thickness.

This behaviour is shared by several heavy-lanthanide oxalates and has led to interest in these compounds as simple precursors for two-dimensional lanthanide-containing materials and thin films.

=== Thermal decomposition ===
Lutetium oxalate hydrates first lose their water of crystallization on heating. Earlier thermal-analysis studies of the heavy rare-earth oxalates found that dehydration is followed by decomposition of the anhydrous oxalate and eventual formation of Lu_{2}O_{3}.

The overall decomposition produces carbon monoxide and carbon dioxide. Carbonate or oxycarbonate-containing intermediate phases may form before crystallization of cubic lutetium oxide.

Modern in-situ high-temperature diffraction studies of lutetium oxalate-derived materials similarly show formation of an amorphous lutetium oxycarbonate intermediate before conversion to cubic Lu_{2}O_{3} at higher temperature.

=== Complex oxalates ===
Lutetium also forms complex oxalates in which additional oxalate ligands coordinate to Lu^{3+}. Acidic oxalato species such as H[Lu(C_{2}O_{4})_{2}]·6H_{2}O have been reported.
