= Lutetium(III) selenate =

Names
- Other names Lutetium selenate

Identifiers
CAS Number	anhydrous: 20148-63-4; octahydrate: 26299-27-4
3D model (JSmol)	anhydrous: Interactive image; octahydrate: Interactive image
- InChI: anhydrous: InChI=1S/2Lu.3H2O4Se/c;;3*1-5(2,3)4/h;;3*(H2,1,2,3,4)/q2*+3;;;/p-6 Key: JIRQUJHGXTYLPM-UHFFFAOYSA-H; octahydrate: InChI=1S/2Lu.3H2O4Se.8H2O/c;;3*1-5(2,3)4;;;;;;;;/h;;3*(H2,1,2,3,4);8*1H2/q2*+3;;;;;;;;;;;/p-6 Key: KGKMJIZFPLJHKQ-UHFFFAOYSA-H
- SMILES: anhydrous: [O-][Se](=O)(=O)[O-].[O-][Se](=O)(=O)[O-].[O-][Se](=O)(=O)[O-].[Lu+3].[Lu+3]; octahydrate: O.O.O.O.O.O.O.O.[Lu+3].[Lu+3].[O-][Se]([O-])(=O)=O.[O-][Se]([O-])(=O)=O.[O-][Se]([O-])(=O)=O

Properties
Chemical formula	Lu_{2}(SeO_{4})_{3}
Molar mass	778.83 g/mol
Appearance	Crystalline solid
- Except where otherwise noted, data are given for materials in their standard state (at 25 °C [77 °F], 100 kPa). Infobox references

Lutetium(III) selenate is an inorganic compound of lutetium and the selenate ion, with the chemical formula Lu_{2}(SeO_{4})_{3}. The best-characterized hydrated form is the octahydrate, Lu_{2}(SeO_{4})_{3}·8H_{2}O.

== Preparation ==
Lutetium(III) selenate can be prepared by reaction of lutetium(III) oxide with selenic acid followed by crystallization from solution:

Lu_{2}O_{3} + 3 H_{2}SeO_{4} → Lu_{2}(SeO_{4})_{3} + 3 H_{2}O

Crystallization from aqueous solution gives the octahydrate.

== Structure and properties ==
Lutetium(III) selenate octahydrate is monoclinic. It belongs to the isostructural series Ln_{2}(SeO_{4})_{3}·8H_{2}O formed by the smaller rare-earth ions from terbium through lutetium.

The structures of these octahydrates contain eight-coordinate Ln^{3+} ions bonded to oxygen atoms from selenate groups and coordinated water molecules. The compounds are closely related structurally across the heavy-lanthanide series.

Infrared spectra of the octahydrates show the characteristic internal vibrations of SeO_{4}^{2−} tetrahedra together with O–H vibrations from the water molecules.

=== Thermal decomposition ===
On heating, lutetium(III) selenate octahydrate first loses its water of crystallization to form anhydrous Lu_{2}(SeO_{4})_{3}.

Further heating causes reduction of selenium from Se(VI) to Se(IV), producing lutetium(III) selenite as an intermediate:

Lu_{2}(SeO_{4})_{3} → Lu_{2}(SeO_{3})_{3} + 3/2 O_{2}

Continued heating gives oxide–selenite intermediates before ultimately producing lutetium(III) oxide, Lu_{2}O_{3}.

The general decomposition sequence reported for the heavy rare-earth selenate octahydrates is:

Ln_{2}(SeO_{4})_{3}·8H_{2}O → Ln_{2}(SeO_{4})_{3} → Ln_{2}(SeO_{3})_{3} → oxide selenites → Ln_{2}O_{3}
