= Lutetium iodate =

Identifiers
CAS Number	15513-87-8 anhydrous; dihydrate: 54172-04-2; tetrahydrate: 24859-46-9
3D model (JSmol)	Interactive image; dihydrate: Interactive image; tetrahydrate: Interactive image
- InChI: InChI=1S/3HIO3.Lu/c3*2-1(3)4;/h3*(H,2,3,4);/q;;;+3/p-3 Key: AWQUKXBZSLEACN-UHFFFAOYSA-K
- SMILES: [Lu+3].O=I(=O)[O-].O=I(=O)[O-].O=I(=O)[O-]; dihydrate: [Lu+3].O=I(=O)[O-].O=I(=O)[O-].O=I(=O)[O-].O.O; tetrahydrate: [Lu+3].O=I(=O)[O-].O=I(=O)[O-].O=I(=O)[O-]O.O.O.O

Properties
Chemical formula	Lu(IO_{3})_{3}
Molar mass	699.68
Solubility in water	2.04×10^{−3} mol·L^{−1}
- Except where otherwise noted, data are given for materials in their standard state (at 25 °C [77 °F], 100 kPa). Infobox references

Lutetium iodate is an inorganic compound with the chemical formula Lu(IO_{3})_{3}. It exists in two anhydrous forms, α-form and β-form, as well as dihydrate and tetrahydrate. It can be produced by the reaction of lutetium nitrate and iodic acid or potassium iodate. It decomposes when heated to generate lutetium oxide.
