= Lutetium–hafnium dating =

Geochronological dating method

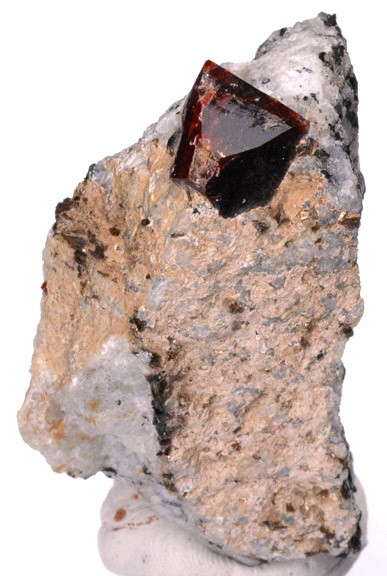
Zircon, a common target for Lu–Hf analysis

Lutetium–hafnium dating is a geochronological dating method utilizing the radioactive decay system of lutetium–176 to hafnium–176. With a commonly accepted half-life of 37.1 billion years, the long-living Lu–Hf decay pair survives through geological time scales, thus is useful in geological studies. Due to chemical properties of the two elements, namely their valences and ionic radii, Lu is usually found in trace amount in rare-earth element loving minerals, such as garnet and phosphates, while Hf is usually found in trace amount in zirconium-rich minerals, such as zircon, baddeleyite and zirkelite.

The trace concentration of the Lu and Hf in earth materials posed some technological difficulties in using Lu–Hf dating extensively in the 1980s. With the use of inductively coupled plasma mass spectrometry (ICP–MS) with multi-collector (also known as MC–ICP–MS) in later years, the dating method is made applicable to date diverse earth materials. The Lu–Hf system is now a common tool in geological studies such as igneous and metamorphic rock petrogenesis, early earth mantle-crust differentiation, and provenance.

== Radiometric dating ==
Lutetium is a rare-earth element, with one naturally occurring stable isotope ^{175}Lu and one naturally occurring radioactive isotope ^{176}Lu. When ^{176}Lu atoms are incorporated into earth materials, such as rocks and minerals, they began to be "trapped" while starting to decay. Through radioactive decay, an unstable nucleus decays into another relatively stable one. Radiometric dating makes use of the decay relationship to calculate how long the atoms have been "trapped", i.e. the time since the earth material was formed.

=== Decay of ^{176}Lu ===
The only natural occurring radioactive isotope of lutetium $\ce{^{176}_{71}Lu}$ decays in the following two ways:

$$\ce{^{176}_{71}Lu -> {^{176}_{72}Hf} + e^-}$$

$$\ce{{^{176}_{71}Lu} +     e^-     -> {^{176}_{70}Yb}}$$

Lutetium, $\ce{^{176}_{71}Lu}$ can decay into $\ce{^{176}_{72}Hf}$, a heavier element, or ytterbium, $\ce{^{176}_{70}Yb}$, a lighter element. However, as the major mode of decay is by β^{−} emission, i.e. release of electron (e^{−}), as in the case for $\ce{^{176}_{71}Lu}$ decaying to $\ce{^{176}_{72}Hf}$, the presence of $\ce{^{176}_{70}Yb}$ is of negligible effect to Lu–Hf age determination.

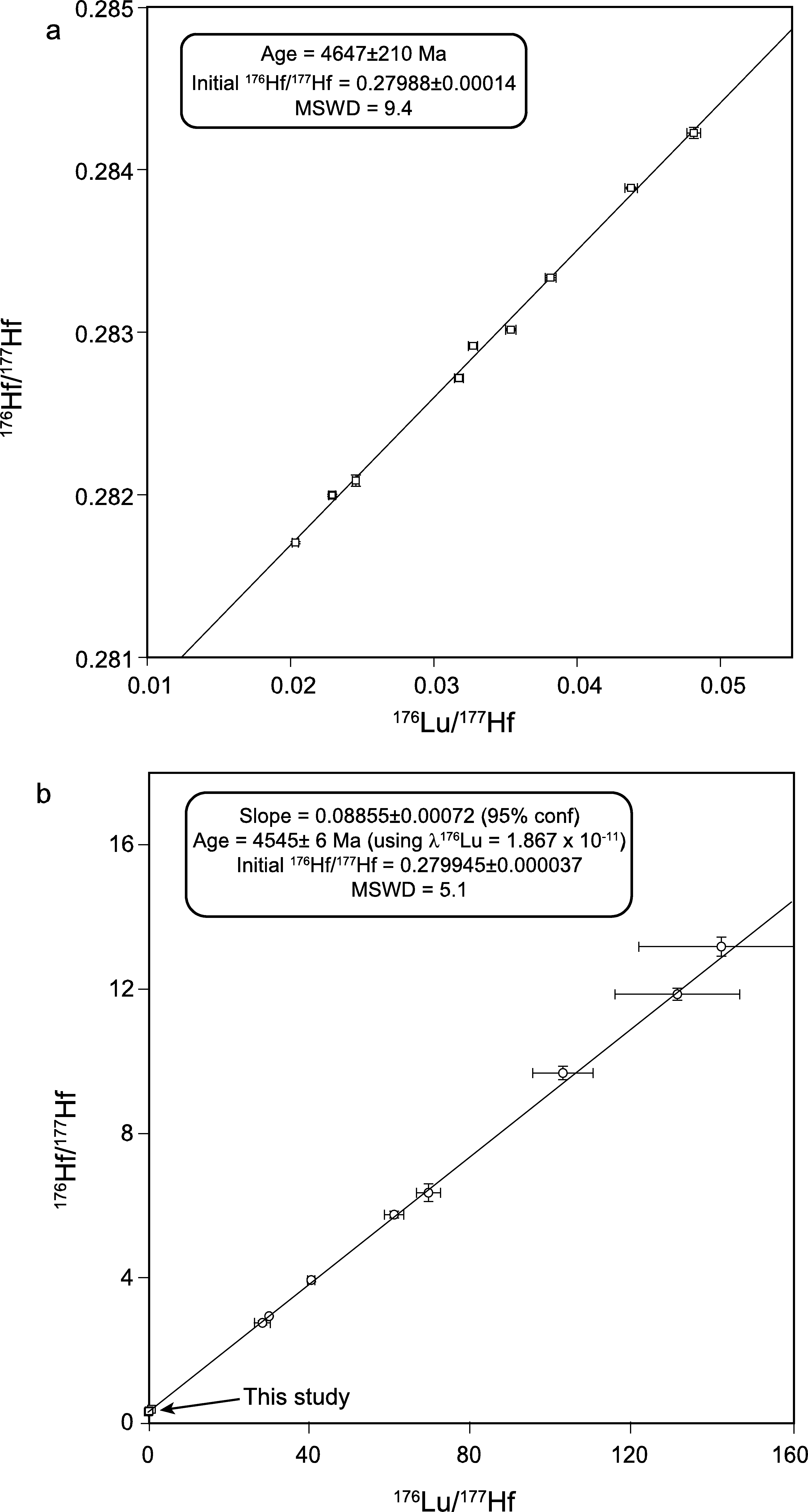
Original figure 2 from Debaille et al. (2017); An example of Lu/Hf isochron.

=== Decay constant determination ===
The decay constant of $\ce{^{176}Lu}$ can be obtained through direct counting experiments and by comparing Lu–Hf ages with other isotope system ages of samples whose ages are determined. The commonly accepted decay constant has the value of 1.867 (± 0.007) × 10^{−11} yr^{−1}.

=== Age determination ===
An age equation is set up for every radiometric dating technique to describe the mathematical relationship of the number of parent and daughter nuclide. In Lu–Hf system, the parent would be Lu (the radioactive isotope) and Hf as the daughter nuclide (the product after radioactive decay). The age equation to Lu–Hf system is as follows:

$$\left(\frac\ce{^{176}Hf}\ce{^{177}Hf}\right) = \left(\frac\ce{^{176}Hf}\ce{^{177}Hf}\right)_i + \left(\frac\ce{^{176}Lu}\ce{^{177}Hf}\right)(e^{\lambda t}-1)$$

where:

- $\ce{(^{176}Hf/^{177}Hf)}$ is the measured ratio of the two isotopes of the sample.
- $\ce{(^{176}Hf/^{177}Hf)_i}$ is the initial ratio of the two isotopes when the sample is formed.
- $\ce{(^{176}Lu/^{177}Hf)}$ is the measured ratio of the two isotopes of the sample.
- λ is the decay constant of $\ce{^{176}Lu}$.
- t is the time since the sample is formed.

The two isotopes, ^{176}Lu and ^{176}Hf, in the system are measured as ratio to the reference stable isotope of ^{177}Hf. The measured ratio can be obtained from mass spectrometry. A common practice for geochronological dating is to establish an isochron plot. Multiple set of data would be measured and plotted with ^{176}Hf/^{177}Hf on y-axis and ^{176}Lu/^{177}Hf on x-axis. A linear relationship would be obtained. The initial ratio can either be assumed to be natural isotopic abundance ratio or, for a better approach, obtained from the y-intercept of plotted isochron. The slope of the plotted isochron would represent $(e^{\lambda t}-1)$.

== Radiogenic Hf isotope geochemistry ==
Hafnium isotope systematics are used as tracers for magmatic processes, based on the different geochemical behaviors of Lu and Hf.

Schematic diagram showing planetesimal formation and differentiation. Volatile elements (light blue) do not condense, while refractory elements (dark brown and orange) form the solid planet (black circle). Following condensation, siderophile elements (dark brown) sink to the center of Earth and form the core, while the orange lithophile elements (orange) form the primitive mantle.

Lutetium and hafnium are both refractory, and lithophile elements by the Goldschmidt classification scheme. This means they are generally found in the silicate fraction of the Earth (i.e., the mantle and crust).

Both elements are incompatible trace elements, but Hf is slightly more incompatible than Lu. Partial melting will fractionate Lu and Hf such that the residual solid has a higher Lu/Hf ratio than the melt. This corresponds to a higher ^{176}Lu/^{177}Hf ratio, and as ^{176}Lu decays to ^{176}Hf, to a higher ^{176}Lu/^{177}Hf ratio in the residual solid. Conversely, the ^{176}Hf/^{177}Hf ratio of the melts is relatively low compared to the residuum. Partial melting of the mantle to form the crust means the crust has relatively high ^{176}Hf/^{177}Hf ratios compared to the mantle. Consequently, the ^{176}Hf/^{177}Hf ratio of a sample is a particularly powerful tool for understanding source reservoirs and crustal evolution.

=== ɛHf (epsilon) values ===
Although Lu and Hf are fractionated during magmatic processes, the degree of fractionation is small, as is the absolute variation in ^{176}Hf/^{177}Hf. Therefore, Hf isotope compositions are represented using ɛ notation, defined as the deviation in parts per ten thousand between a sample and the chondritic uniform reservoir (CHUR) standard, at a given time t:

$$\varepsilon_{\ce{Hf}(t)} = \left[\frac{\left(\frac\ce{^{176}Hf}\ce{^{177}Hf}\right)_{\ce{sample}(t)}}{\left(\frac\ce{^{176}Hf}\ce{^{177}Hf}\right)_{\ce{CHUR}(t)}} - 1\right] \times 10\,000$$

Because the composition of CHUR evolves over time as ^{176}Lu decays, calculating the ɛ_{Hf} value of a sample requires accurate age constraints.

A positive ɛ_{Hf} value means that ^{176}Hf/^{177}Hf ratio in a sample is higher than CHUR. This is interpreted to mean the sample originated from a reservoir which initially had a higher ^{176}Lu/^{177}Hf ratio (such as the mantle). These samples are referred to as "juvenile" or "radiogenic". Conversely, negative ɛ_{Hf} values indicate the sample formed from a reservoir with a lower ^{176}Hf/^{177}Hf ratio, and by extension, a lower ^{176}Lu/^{177}Hf ratio (such as the crust). These samples are referred to as "evolved" or "unradiogenic". Present-day ɛ_{Hf} values range from +15 to -70.

=== Lu/Hf and Hf/Hf ratios of CHUR ===
Accurate calculation of ɛ_{Hf} values requires an accurate determination of Lu and Hf isotope ratios in the chondritic uniform reservoir (CHUR). Chondrites are primitive materials from the solar nebula, which later accreted to form planetesimals. The composition of CHUR is used as a reference for the composition of undifferentiated rocky material, and by extension, for the bulk silicate Earth.

However, variability in $\ce{^{176}Lu/^{177}Hf}$ and $\ce{^{176}Hf/^{177}Hf}$ ratios of chondrites adds uncertainty to the composition of CHUR. Early studies did not restrict meteorite samples by petrologic type (i.e., degree of alteration); some studies recorded up 18% variation in $\ce{^{176}Lu/^{177}Hf}$ ratios, corresponding to a range of almost 14 ɛ_{Hf} units. The isotope ratios of CHUR in wide use today were measured in chondrites with minimal thermal metamorphism (petrologic types 1, 2, and 3); $\ce{^{176}Lu/^{177}Hf}$ ratios in these samples have a range of ~3%.

== CHUR model age ==
The chondritic uniform reservoir model age is the age at which the material, from which rock and mineral forms, leaves the chondritic uniform reservoir, i.e. the mantle, when assuming the silicate earth retained chemical signature of chondritic uniform reservoir. As described in previous section, melting will cause a fractionation of Lu and Hf in the melt and residue solid, thus resulting in Lu/Hf and Hf/Hf values deviating from chondritic uniform reservoir values. The time or age at which the Lu/Hf and Hf/Hf values from the sample and chondritic uniform reservoir matches is the chondritic uniform reservoir model age.

$$t_\ce{CHUR} = \left(\frac{1}{\lambda}\right) \ln \left[1 + \frac{\left(\frac\ce{^{176}Hf}\ce{^{177}Hf}\right)_\text{sample(0)} - \left(\frac\ce{^{176}Hf}\ce{^{177}Hf}\right)_\text{CHUR(0)}}{\left(\frac\ce{^{176}Lu}\ce{^{177}Hf}\right)_\text{sample(0)} - \left(\frac\ce{^{176}Lu}\ce{^{177}Hf}\right)_\text{CHUR(0)}}\right]$$

where:

- "0" in the bracket denoting time = 0, meaning present day.
- t _{CHUR} is the chondritic uniform reservoir model age.
- λ is the decay constant.
- $\left(\frac\ce{^{176}Hf}\ce{^{177}Hf}\right)_{\ce{sample}}$ is the Hf-176 to Hf-177 ratio in the sample.
- $\left(\frac\ce{^{176}Hf}\ce{^{177}Hf}\right)_{\ce{CHUR}}$ is the Hf-176 to Hf-177 ratio in the chondritic uniform reservoir.

== Analytical methods ==
The Lu-Hf system was first investigated in the 1980s using thermal ionization mass spectrometry (TIMS). However study was severely limited by several analytical challenges. The high ionization potential of Hf meant it was difficult to analyze, and required high concentrations of Hf to be successful. Furthermore, Hf is also difficult to separate from Zr and Ti in solution, and isotope ratios of Lu cannot be corrected during isotope dilution, as there are only two naturally occurring isotopes. This limited widespread use of the Lu-Hf system until the development of inductively coupled plasma mass spectrometry (MC-ICPMS) in the late 1990s..

The MC-ICPMS method circumvents the analytical problems of TIMS, and allows precise determination of isotope ratios in minerals with low concentrations of Lu (e.g, zircon and chondritic meteorites) or Hf (e.g., garnet and apatite)..

Lu and Hf isotopes may be measured either in situ or in solution. In situ analyses are done via laser ablation (LA-ICP-MS). Samples for solution analyses are dissolved. Full sample dissolution is typically done in HF and HNO_{3} in a Teflon bomb at 160°C for four days, followed by ion exchange chromatography to separate and purify Lu and Hf. Solution analysis of garnet is typically less aggressive, to avoid dissolving high-Hf phases such as zircon and rutile.

== Applications ==
=== Igneous rock petrogenesis ===
Lu–Hf isotope system can provide information on where and when a magmatic body originate. By applying Hf concentration determination to zircons from A-type granites in Laurentia, ɛHf values ranging from −31.9 to −21.9 were obtained, representing a crustal melt origin. Apatite has also promising Lu–Hf information, as apatite has high Lu content relative to Hf content. In cases where rocks are silica-poor, if more evolved rocks of the same magmatic origin can be identified, apatite could provide high Lu/Hf ratio data to produce accurate isochron, with an example from Smålands Taberg, southern Sweden, where apatite Lu/Hf age of 1204.3±1.8 million yr was identified as the lower boundary of a 1.2 billion yr magmatic event that caused the Fe–Ti mineralization at Smålands Taberg.

=== Metamorphic rock petrogenesis and metamorphic events ===
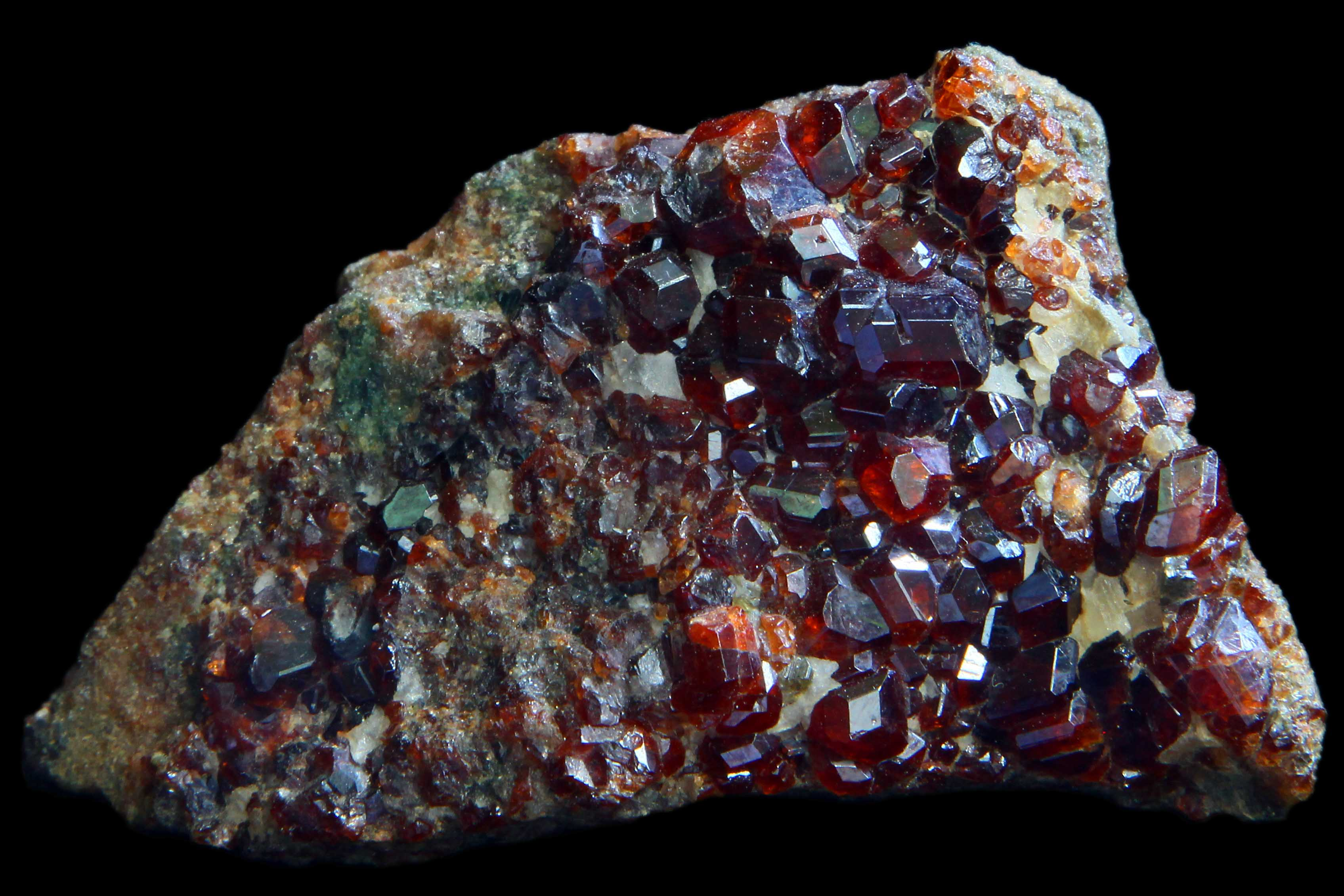
Garnet, a common metamorphic mineral target for Lu/Hf dating.

In understanding metamorphic rocks, Lu–Hf can still provide information of origin. In cases where zircon phase is absent or very low in abundance, such as eclogite with cumulate protolith, kyanite and orthopyroxene eclogites can be candidate for Hf analysis. Although the overall rare-earth element concentration is low is the two eclogites, Lu/Hf ratios is high, therefore enabling concentration determination of Lu and Hf.

Garnets play an important role in Lu/Hf applications, as they are common metamorphic minerals while having high affinity to rare-earth element. This means garnets generally have high Lu/Hf ratios. Dating of garnets with Lu–Hf could provide information of history of garnet growth during prograde metamorphism and peak P-T conditions. With the help of garnet Lu/Hf ages, a study on Lago di Cignana, western Alps, Italy, an age of 48.8±2.1 million yr for lower boundary of garnet growth time was identified. From this, the burial rate of ultra-high-pressure rocks at Lago di Cignana was estimated to be 0.23–0.47 cm/yr, which suggest ocean floor rocks were carried down to subduction and reached ultra-high-pressure metamorphism conditions.

Conventional isochron ages are obtained from bulk garnet separates and are only an estimate of the average age of the overall growth of garnet. To give precise estimates of the pace of growth of a single garnet crystal, geochronologists use microsampling methods to collect and date small consecutive zones of garnet crystals.

Another low-temperature, high-pressure metamorphic index mineral, lawsonite was brought into use in recent years to understand subduction metamorphism using Lu/Hf dating. A study showed that lawsonite could be significant in dating low-temperature metamorphic rocks, typically in prograde metamorphism in a subduction zone settings, as garnets are formed after lawsonite is stabilized, so that lawsonite can be enriched in Lu for radiometric dating.

=== Early Earth mantle-crust differentiation ===
The crust formation process is supposedly chemically depleting the mantle, as crust forms from partial melts originating from the mantle. However, the process and extent of depletion could not be concluded based on a few isotope characteristics, as some isotope systems are thought to be susceptible to re-setting by metamorphism. To further constrain the modelling of depleted mantle, Lu–Hf information from zircons are useful, as zircons are resistant to Lu–Hf re-equilibrating.

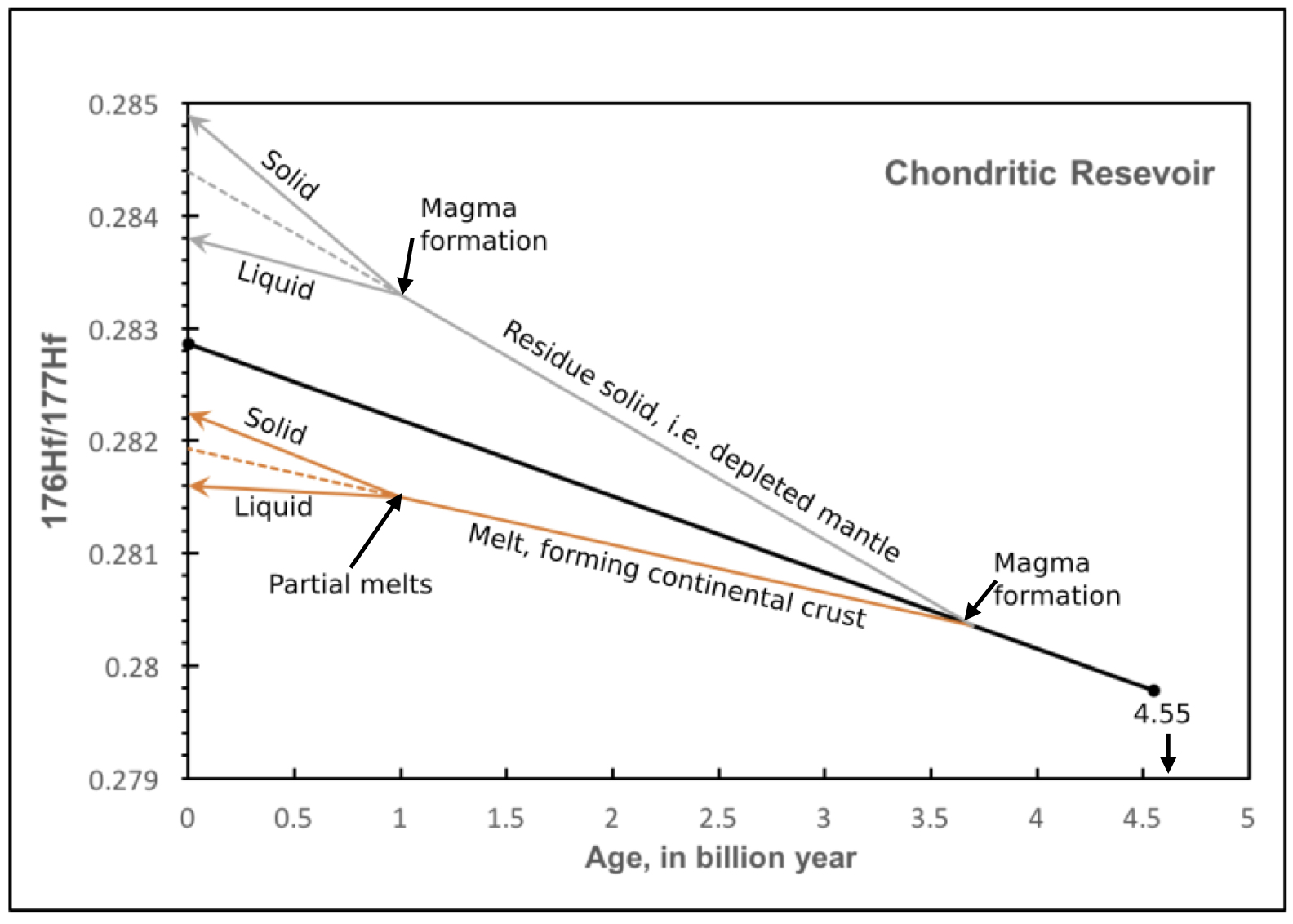
A schematic Hf evolution diagram.The black curve is plotted using ^{176}Hf/^{177}Hf values from Patchett and Tatsumoto (1980). All other curves and values are hypothetical. 4.55 billion year was assumed to be the time of Earth formation.

=== Detrital zircon and provenance ===
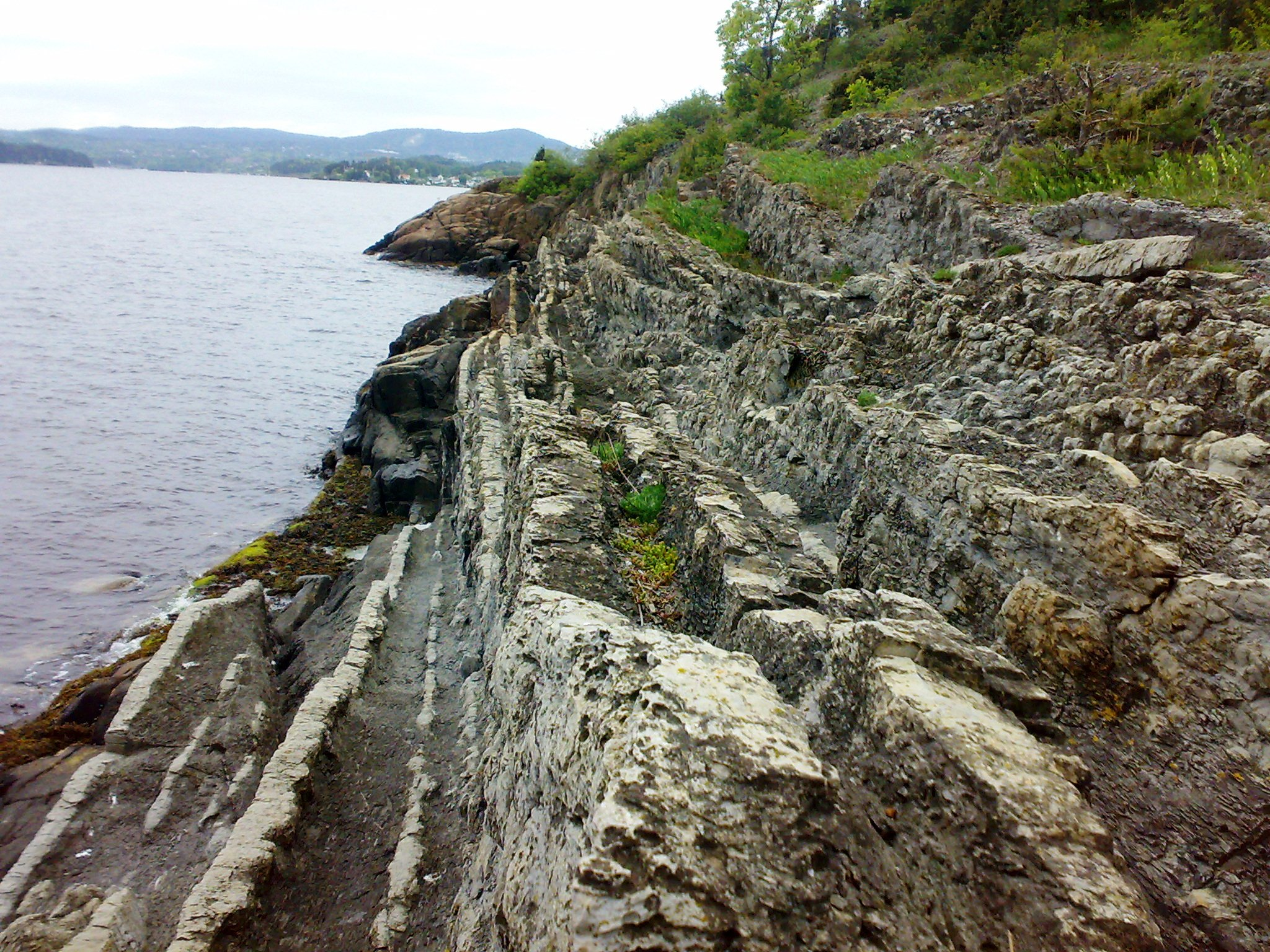
Oslo Rift, also known as Oslo Graben.

Hf ages determined from detrital zircon can help to identify major event of crustal growth. By analyzing detrital zircon in Yangtze River sediments, a group of researchers produced a statistical distribution of Hf model ages of the sediments. The statistical peaks of age ranges were identified: 2000 Ma–1200 Ma, 2700 Ma–2400 Ma, and 3200 Ma-2900 Ma, indicating crustal growth events at ages of Paleoproterozoic to Mesoproterozoic, and of Archean in the South China Block.

Hf ages from detrital zircon also help tracing sediment source. A study on detrital zircon from sandstones in the Oslo Rift, Norway identified major sediment source in Fennoscandia region and also a minor source in Variscan Mountains of central Europe during Late Devonian to Late Carboniferous by U–Pb and Lu–Hf characteristics of source rocks and sediments.
