= DePaolo =

DePaolo is a surname. Notable people with the surname include:

- Donald DePaolo (born 1951), American geochemist
- Pete DePaolo (1898–1980), American racing driver
