= Daniel P. Schrag =

American geologist

- Born: January 25, 1966 (age 60)
- Education: Yale University (BS); University of California, Berkeley (PhD)
- Awards: MacArthur Fellowship (2000)
- Scientific career
- Fields: Geology
- Workplaces: Harvard University; Princeton University
- Thesis: Oxygen Isotope Exchange and Transport in Deep Sea Sediments and Pore Fluids : Deciphering the History of Earth's Climate (1993)
- Doctoral advisor: Donald J. DePaolo, Frank M. Richter

Daniel Paul Schrag (born January 25, 1966) is the Sturgis Hooper Professor of Geology, Professor of Environmental Science and Engineering at Harvard University and Director of the Harvard University Center for the Environment. He also co-directs the Science, Technology and Public Policy Program at the Belfer Center for Science and International Affairs at the Harvard University Harvard Kennedy School. He is also an external professor at the Santa Fe Institute.

He has also worked on a variety of clean energy projects incorporating carbon capture and storage to reduce emissions from power plants, fuel refineries and fertilizer plants. With John Marshall, he co-founded The Potential Energy Coalition, an environmental NGO aimed at deploying more effective communication strategies around climate change. With Eric Love, he co-founded The Carbon Endowment, an environmental NGO aimed at acquiring underground coal reserves and conserving them in perpetuity. He has served on the advisory boards of a variety of clean energy companies including Kobold Metals, a company trying to accelerate the discovery of critical metals for lithium-ion batteries.

== Early life and education ==
Schrag attended the Ethical Culture School in NYC from 3rd to 12th grade, graduating in 1984. He received his B.S. in geology & geophysics and political science from Yale University in 1988. He received his Ph.D. in geology from University of California, Berkeley in 1993 under the supervision of Donald J. DePaolo, co-advised by Frank Richter from the University of Chicago.

== Career ==
Much of his early research focused on reconstructing past climate change, including work on a deep sea sediments from the Cretaceous and early Cenozoic; theories for Pleistocene ice-age cycles, including a new way of reconstructing deep ocean temperature and salinity using pore fluids; and reconstructing tropical climate variability from geochemical variations in corals and trees. His work on radiocarbon in corals with Tom Guilderson led to an interest in the oceanography of the tropical Pacific, including recent work on possible mechanisms for decadal variability. He has also worked on more ancient times in Earth history, collaborating with his colleague Paul F. Hoffman on developing and extending the Snowball Earth hypothesis, as well as work on developing a mechanistic understanding for how atmospheric oxygen has evolved through Earth history. His interest in modern and future climate change led to a focus on technological approaches to mitigating future climate change, including work on carbon capture and storage (CCS), low-carbon options for transportation fuels, and a wide variety of other issues in energy technology and policy including direct air capture of carbon dioxide.

=== Current ===
- Sturgis Hooper Professor of Geology, Professor of Environmental Science and Engineering, Harvard University
- Co-Director, Science, Technology, and Public Policy Program, Harvard Kennedy School
- Senior Advisor, Salata Institute for Climate and Sustainability (Harvard University)
- External Faculty and Co-Chair of Science Board, Santa Fe Institute
- Board Chair and co-founder, The Carbon Endowment
- Board member and co-founder, Potential Energy Coalition

=== Past ===
- 2004-2023 Director, Harvard University Center for the Environment
- 2014-2021 Area Chair for Environmental Science and Engineering, Harvard University
- 2009-2017 President Obama's Council of Advisors for Science and Technology (PCAST)
- 2011-2018 Chair, Environmental Advisory Board, JPB Foundation
- 2002-2005 Board of Reviewing Editors, Science
- 1997-2000 Associate Professor, Dept. of Earth and Planetary Sciences, Harvard University
- 1995-2014 Senior Fellow, Canadian Institute for Advanced Research
- 1994-1997 Assistant Professor, Dept. of Geosciences, Princeton University
- 1993 Visiting Researcher, Indiana University
- 1988 Geologist, Newmont Mining

=== Memberships ===
- American Geophysical Union
- Geochemical Society
- American Meteorological Society
- American Association for the Advancement of Science (AAAS)

== Awards and honors ==
- Member, American Academy of Arts and Sciences (2019)
- Fellow, American Association for the Advancement of Science (2012)
- James B. Macelwane Medal, American Geophysical Union (2001)
- MacArthur Fellow (2000)
- Technology Review TR100 – 100 young innovators for the next century (1999)
- Ocean Drilling Program Fellowship, Berkeley (1992)
- Samuel Lewis Penfield Prize in Mineralogy, Yale (1988)
- Katherine K. Walker Prize in Political Science, Yale (1988)
- Frank M. Patterson Prize in Political Science, Yale (1987)
- Westinghouse Science Talent Search Finalist (1984)
