= Ammonium butyrate =

Names
- IUPAC name azanium;butanoate
- Other names Ammonium butanoate

Identifiers
CAS Number	14287-04-8
3D model (JSmol)	Interactive image
ChemSpider	24785
ECHA InfoCard	100.034.718
EC Number	238-207-5
PubChem CID	26607
CompTox Dashboard (EPA)	DTXSID60884742
- InChI: InChI=1S/C4H8O2.H3N/c1-2-3-4(5)6;/h2-3H2,1H3,(H,5,6);1H3 Key: YNTQKXBRXYIAHM-UHFFFAOYSA-N
- SMILES: C(C(O)=O)CC.N

Properties
Chemical formula	C_{4}H_{11}NO_{2}
Molar mass	105.137 g·mol^{−1}
Appearance	Yellow-white powder

Hazards
- GHS labelling
Pictograms	(GHS07: Exclamation mark)
- Except where otherwise noted, data are given for materials in their standard state (at 25 °C [77 °F], 100 kPa). Infobox references

Ammonium butyrate is a chemical compound with the chemical formula C_{3}H_{7}COONH_{4}. This is an organic ammonium salt of butyric acid.

== Synthesis ==
The compound can be prepared by reacting dry ammonia gas with butyric acid in ether:

NH_{3} + C_{3}H_{7}COOH → C_{3}H_{7}COONH_{4}↓

== Chemical properties ==
It can react with ammonia to form an ammine compound C_{3}H_{7}COONH_{4}·xNH_{3} at low temperatures.

Heating ammonium butyrate with phosphorus pentoxide produces butyronitrile C_{3}H_{7}CN.

== Uses ==
The compound is used as an emulsifying agent for leather, oils, soaps, and for textile finishing.

Also, it can be used as a mineralizer for growing calcite single crystals.
