= Lutetium(III) oxide (data page) =

Chemical data page

This page provides supplementary chemical data on Lutetium(III) oxide

== Thermodynamic properties ==
Phase behavior
Solid properties
Std enthalpy change of formation -Δ_{f}H^{~~o~~}_{solid}	448.9 kcal/mol
Std entropy change of formation -Δ_{f}S^{~~o~~}_{solid}	71.9 kcal/mol
Std Gibbs free energy change of formation -Δ_{f}G^{~~o~~}_{solid}	427.5 kcal/mol

== Material Safety Data Sheet ==
The handling of this chemical may incur notable safety precautions. It is highly recommend that you seek the Material Safety Datasheet (MSDS) for this chemical from a reliable source such as SIRI, and follow its directions.

This box:
- Except where noted otherwise, data relate to Standard temperature and pressure.
- Reliability of data general note.
