= Lutetium tantalate =

Chemical compound

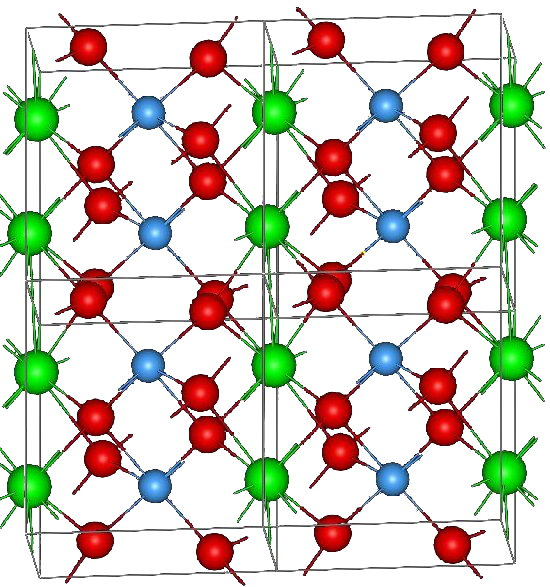
M' structure of LuTaO_{4}. Atoms are: O(red), Ta(blue) and Lu(green)

Lutetium tantalate is a chemical compound of lutetium, tantalum and oxygen with the formula LuTaO_{4}. With a density of 9.81 g/cm^{3}, this mixed oxide compound is the densest known white stable material. (Although thorium dioxide ThO_{2} is also white and has a higher density of 10 g/cm^{3}, it is radioactively unstable; while not radioactive enough to make it unstable as a material, even its low rate of decay is still too much for certain uses such as phosphors for detecting ionising radiation.) The white color and high density of LuTaO_{4} make it ideal for phosphor applications, though the high cost of lutetium is a hindrance.

== Properties ==
Under standard conditions, LuTaO_{4} has a monoclinic (labeled as M'; Pearson symbol mP12, space group = P2/a, No 13) fergusonite-type crystal structure. This can be changed to an I2/a (M) structure by annealing at 1,600 °C. Both structures are stable under standard conditions. In the M' structure, the lutetium atom is 8-fold coordinated with oxygen and forms a distorted antiprism with a C_{2} site symmetry. The structure of lutetium tantalate is identical to that of yttrium tantalate (YTaO_{4}) and gadolinium tantalate (GdTaO_{4}).

Lutetium tantalate itself is weakly fluorescent. Bright emission is achieved by incorporating small amounts (about 1%) of various rare-earth dopants during the crystal growth process, for example, with europium (sharp red line at 610 nm), samarium (red: 610 nm), terbium (green-yellow: 495 and 545 nm lines), praseodymium (red: 615 nm), thulium (blue: 455 nm), dysprosium (orange: 580 nm) or niobium (blue: 400 nm, broad peak). The emission is best excited by electrons, X-rays or ultraviolet light at 220 nm. The high density of LuTaO_{4} favors X-ray excitation, which has relatively more efficient, stronger absorption in LuTaO_{4}, compared to other materials. LuTaO_{4} also exhibits thermoluminescence — it glows in the dark when heated after illumination.

== Preparation ==
To prepare a sample of lutetium tantalate, powders of lutetium and tantalum oxides (Lu_{2}O_{3} and Ta_{2}O_{5}) are mixed and annealed at a temperature above 1,200 °C for several hours. To prepare a phosphor, a small fraction of appropriate material, such as an oxide of another rare-earth metal, is added to the mixture before annealing. After cooling, the product is leached with water, washed, filtered and dried, resulting in a white powder consisting of micrometre-sized particles of LuTaO_{4}.
