= Ammonium isobutyrate =

Names
- IUPAC name Ammonium 2-methylpropanoate
- Other names AIB

Identifiers
CAS Number	22228-82-6
3D model (JSmol)	Interactive image
ChemSpider	146993
ECHA InfoCard	100.040.758
EC Number	244-850-2
PubChem CID	13684994
UNII	3F03259M1O
CompTox Dashboard (EPA)	DTXSID2066771
- InChI: InChI=1S/C4H8O2.H3N/c1-3(2)4(5)6;/h3H,1-2H3,(H,5,6);1H3 Key: MDUBPQGQPBQGGN-UHFFFAOYSA-N
- SMILES: [NH4+].CC(C)C([O-])=O

Properties
Chemical formula	C_{4}H_{11}NO_{2}
Molar mass	105.137 g·mol^{−1}
Appearance	white crystalline solid
Boiling point	155.2 ºC
Solubility in water	solubile

Hazards
Flash point	58.2 ºC
- Except where otherwise noted, data are given for materials in their standard state (at 25 °C [77 °F], 100 kPa). Infobox references

Ammonium isobutyrate is an organic chemical compound with the chemical formula (CH_{3})_{2}CHCOONH_{4}. This is the ammonium salt of isobutyric acid.

== Structure ==
Ammonium isobutyrate consists of the isobutyrate anion (the conjugate base of isobutyric acid) and an ammonium cation (NH_{4}^{+}).

== Synthesis ==
Ammonium isobutyrate is synthesized primarily through a straightforward acid–base reaction between isobutyric acid and ammonia:

(CH_{3})_{2}CHCOOH + NH_{3} → [(CH_{3})_{2}CHCOO]^{−} [NH_{4}]^{+}

== Physical properties ==
The compound appears as a colorless or white crystalline solid at room temperature, though it may also be encountered as a concentrated aqueous solution due to its high solubility in water.

== Uses ==
The compound is primarily used in chemical synthesis and as a buffering agent in various industrial and research applications.
