= Donald DePaolo =

American geochemist

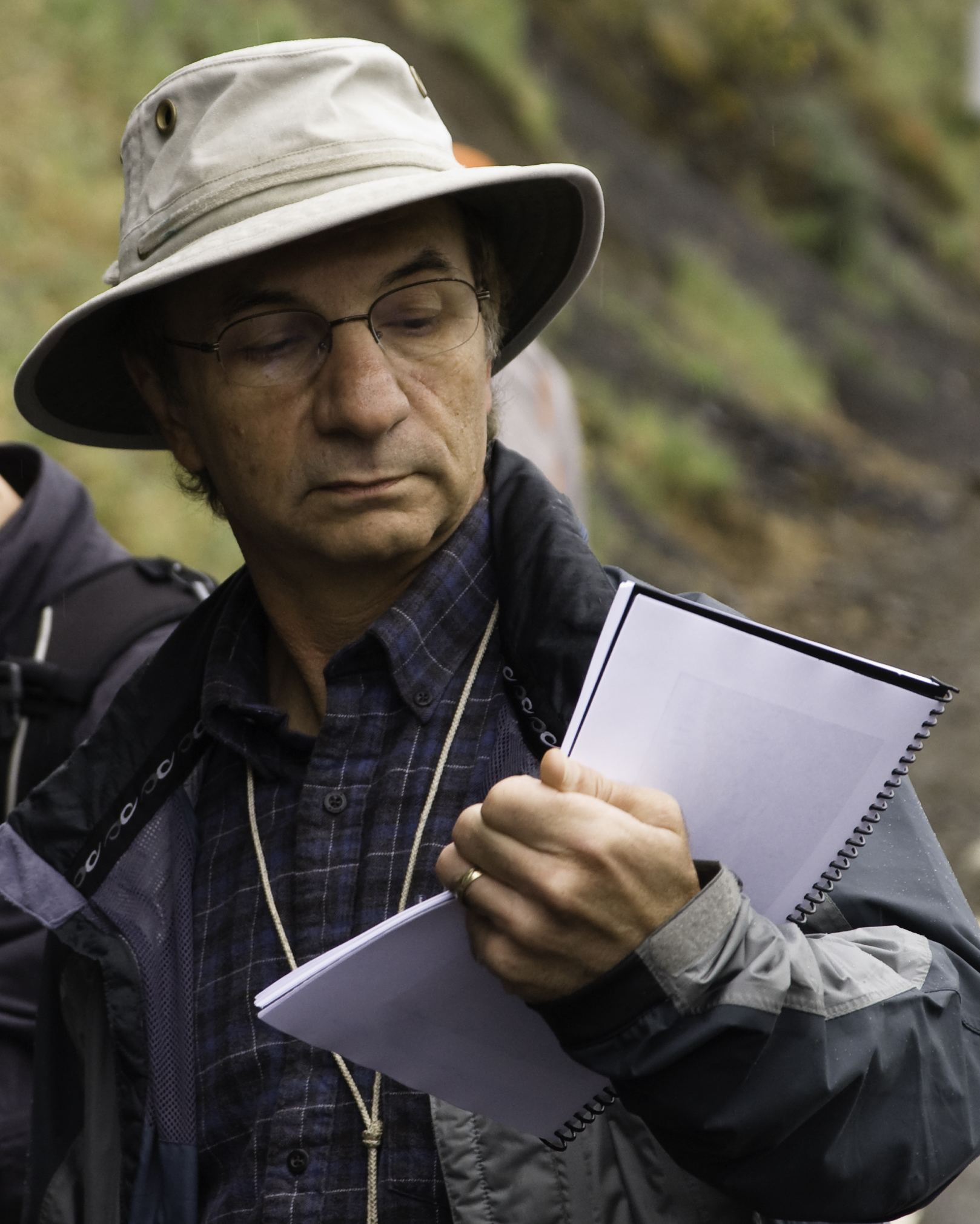
- Donald J. DePaolo on a University of California Berkeley field trip, 2009
- Born: Donald James DePaolo; 1951 (age 74–75)
- Education: Binghamton University; California Institute of Technology
- Scientific career
- Fields: Earth science
- Workplaces: University of California, Berkeley
- Doctoral advisor: Gerald Wasserburg
- Doctoral students: Daniel P. Schrag

Donald James DePaolo (born 1951) is an American professor of geochemistry in the department of earth and planetary science at the University of California, Berkeley and associate laboratory director for energy and environmental sciences at the Lawrence Berkeley National Laboratory.

== Biographical summary ==
DePaolo was born in 1951 and grew up in upstate New York.

== Career ==
DePaolo received his B.S. degree with honors in geology from Binghamton University in 1973 and earned his Ph.D. in geology with a minor in chemistry under Gerald Wasserburg at the California Institute of Technology in 1978. That same year, he began an assistant professorship at the University of California, Los Angeles Department of Geology and Geochemistry and subsequently earned his associate (1981–1983) and full professorship (1983–1988).

In 1988, he began his term as professor of geochemistry at the University of California, Berkeley in the department of earth and planetary science, with a joint appointment as a faculty scientist in the earth sciences division at the Lawrence Berkeley National Laboratory. Upon his arrival at LBNL, DePaolo established the Center for Isotope Geochemistry, a joint research facility between LBNL and UC Berkeley.

In 1998, he was made the Class of 1951 Professor of Geochemistry, and served as chair of the department from 1990 to 1993. From 1998 to 2006 DePaolo served as geochemistry department head at LBNL; in 2007 he became earth sciences division director and from 2010 to 2011 he served as acting associate laboratory director for energy and environmental sciences before accepting the position permanently on April 1, 2011. In 2009, DePaolo became the director of the Center for Nanoscale Control of Geologic CO_{2} (EFRC).

== Research interests ==
DePaolo has coauthored over 300 peer-reviewed articles and reviews. His research interests focus on using naturally occurring isotope variations to explore questions such as:

- Origin of the deep-source Hawaiian plume and other hotspots and theories on mantle dynamics
- Tracking fluids moving through groundwater systems, with application to tracing contaminants
- Understanding the carbon cycle, carbon mineralization, and carbon capture strategies
- Understanding isotope fractionation of molten materials
- Magma chamber processes and life cycles of volcanoes
- Evolution of seawater geochemistry and mid-ocean ridge hydrothermal circulation
- Isotopic evidence that may lead to detecting life on other planets
- Chronology studies of both difficult-to-date young volcanic rocks and ancient continental rocks
- Isotopic composition of old ocean sediments, with implications for climate shifts

== Major contributions ==
In his early career, DePaolo pioneered the use of samarium and neodymium isotope ratios to constrain the age and chemical evolution of rocks. DePaolo and his then-advisor Gerald Wasserburg made the first Nd isotope measurements on terrestrial igneous rocks. An important byproduct of this work was the development of epsilon notation (ε), with which initial ^{143}Nd/^{144}Nd values could be distinguished from the chondritic uniform reservoir (CHUR) in parts per ten thousand. Key principles of the Nd isotope system were laid out in his 1988 book, Neodymium Isotope Geochemistry: An Introduction.

DePaolo's work has since led to significant advances in using various isotope systems to constrain rates of metamorphic processes, quantify continental weathering and elemental seawater budgets through geologic time, and model fluid-rock interactions. As principal investigator of the Hawaii Scientific Drilling Project (HSDP), DePaolo and coworkers sampled the flank of Mauna Kea to a depth of several kilometers. Major findings included a determination of the geochemical structure of the Hawaiian mantle plume. His recent research provides a framework for understanding the partitioning of stable isotopes during mineral growth, with a focus on isotopes of calcium.

== Recent service ==
- 2008 DOE/Basic Energy Sciences/BESAC subcommittee on New Era Science
- 2005-2008 Chair NRC Committee on Grand Research Questions in Earth Sciences
- 2003-2008 NSF Continental Dynamics Panel, EAR
- 2004-2008 Science Advisory Committee SAFOD
- 2007-2010 Day Medal Committee, GSA
- 2002- Board of Directors, Berkeley Geochronology Center
- 2005-2008 CIDER steering Committee

== Special Awards and Honors ==
- 2019 V. M. Goldschmidt Award
- 2014 Harry H. Hess Medal
- 2009 Fellow, American Association for the Advancement of Science
- 2000 Urey Medal, European Assoc. of Geochemistry
- 2000 John Simon Guggenheim Fellow
- 1999 Arthur L. Day Medal, Geol. S
- 1997-98 Miller Research Professor, U.C. Berkeley
- 1997 Geochemistry Fellow, Geochem. Soc. and EAG
- 1997 Fellow, Geological Soc. Am
- 1994-95 Fulbright Senior Scholar, Australia National University
- 1994 Fellow, American Academy of Arts and Sciences
- 1993 Member, National Academy of Sciences
- 1992 Fellow, California Academy of Sciences
- 1987 Mineralogical Society of America Award
- 1987 Fellow, Mineralogical Society of America
- 1983 J.B. MacElwane Award, American Geophysical Union
- 1983 Fellow, American Geophysical Union
- 1978 F.W. Clarke Medal, Geochemical Society
