= Isochron dating =

Technique of radiometric dating

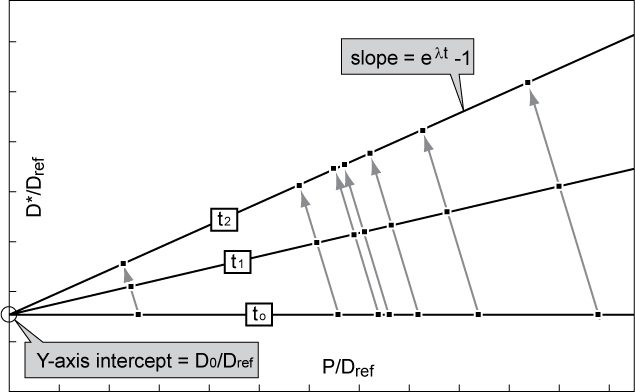
An isochron plot of the radiogenic daughter isotope (D*) against the parent isotope (P), all normalized to a stable isotope of the daughter element (D_{ref}). It demonstrates the isotopic evolution as the sample ages from t_{0} to t_{1} to t_{2}.

Isochron dating is a common technique of radiometric dating and is applied to date certain events, such as crystallization, metamorphism, shock events, and differentiation of precursor melts, in the history of rocks. Isochron dating can be further separated into mineral isochron dating and whole rock isochron dating; both techniques are applied frequently to date terrestrial and extraterrestrial rocks (meteorites and Moon rocks). The advantage of isochron dating as compared to simple radiometric dating techniques is that no assumptions are needed about the initial amount of the daughter nuclide in the radioactive decay sequence. Indeed, the initial amount of the daughter product can be determined using isochron dating. This technique can be applied if the daughter element has at least one stable isotope other than the daughter isotope into which the parent nuclide decays.

== Basis for method ==
All forms of isochron dating assume that the source of the rock or rocks contained unknown amounts of both radiogenic and non-radiogenic isotopes of the daughter element, along with some amount of the parent nuclide. Thus, at the moment of crystallization, the ratio of the concentration of the radiogenic isotope of the daughter element to that of the non-radiogenic isotope is some value independent of the concentration of the parent. As time goes on, some amount of the parent decays into the radiogenic isotope of the daughter, increasing the ratio of the concentration of the radiogenic isotope to that of the non-radiogenic isotope of the daughter element. The greater the initial concentration of the parent, the greater the concentration of the radiogenic daughter isotope will be at some particular time. Thus, the ratio of the radiogenic to non-radiogenic isotopes of the daughter element will become larger with time, while the ratio of parent to daughter will become smaller. For rocks that start out with a small concentration of the parent, the radiogenic/non-radiogenic ratio of the daughter element will not change as quickly as it will with rocks that start out with a large concentration of the parent.

== Assumptions ==
An isochron diagram will only give a valid age if all samples are cogenetic, which means they have the same initial isotopic composition (that is, the rocks are from the same unit, the minerals are from the same rock, etc.), all samples have the same initial isotopic composition (at t_{0}), and the system has remained closed.

== Isochron plots ==
The mathematical expression from which the isochron is derived is

${\mathrm{D*}} = {\mathrm{D}}_{\mathrm{0}} + \mathrm{n} \cdot (e^{\lambda t}-1),$

where

t is age of the sample,
D* is number of atoms of the radiogenic daughter isotope in the sample,
D_{0} is number of atoms of the daughter isotope in the original or initial composition,
n is number of atoms of the parent isotope in the sample at the present,
λ is the decay constant of the parent isotope, equal to the inverse of the radioactive half-life of the parent isotope times the natural logarithm of 2, and
(e^{λt}-1) is the slope of the isochron which defines the age of the system.

Because the isotopes are measured by mass spectrometry, ratios are used instead of absolute concentrations since mass spectrometers usually measure the former rather than the latter. (See the section on isotope ratio mass spectrometry.) As such, isochrons are typically defined by the following equation, which normalizes the concentration of parent and radiogenic daughter isotopes to the concentration of a non-radiogenic isotope of the daughter element that is assumed to be constant:

$\left(\frac{\mathrm{D*}}{\mathrm{D}_{ref}}\right)_{\mathrm{present}} = \left(\frac{\mathrm{D_0}}{\mathrm{D}_{ref}}\right)_{\mathrm{initial}} + \left(\frac{\mathrm{P_t}}{\mathrm{D}_{ref}}\right) \cdot (e^{\lambda t}-1),$

where

$D_{ref}$ is the concentration of the non-radiogenic isotope of the daughter element (assumed constant),
$D*$ is the present concentration of the radiogenic daughter isotope,
$D_0$ is the initial concentration of the radiogenic daughter isotope, and

$P_t$ is the present concentration of the parent isotope that has decayed over time $t$.

To perform dating, a rock is crushed to a fine powder, and minerals are separated by various physical and magnetic means. Each mineral has different ratios between parent and daughter concentrations. For each mineral, the ratios are related by the following equation:

${\mathrm{D}_0 + \Delta{P}_t \over D_{ref} } = {\Delta{P}_t \over P_i-\Delta{P}_t } \left ( { P_i-\Delta{P}_t \over D_{ref} }\right ) + {D_0 \over D_{ref}}$ (1)

where

$P_i$ is the initial concentration of the parent isotope, and
$\Delta{P}_t$ is the total amount of the parent isotope which has decayed by time $t$.

The proof of (1) amounts to simple algebraic manipulation. It is useful in this form because it exhibits the relationship between quantities that actually exist at present. To wit, $P_i-\Delta{P}_t$, $D_0+\Delta{P}_t$ and $D_{ref}$ respectively correspond to the concentrations of parent, daughter and non-radiogenic isotopes found in the rock at the time of measurement.

The ratios $\frac{\mathrm{D*}}{\mathrm{D}_{ref}}$or $D_0+\Delta{P}_t \over D_{ref}$ (relative concentration of present daughter and non-radiogenic isotopes) and $\frac{\mathrm{P_t}}{\mathrm{D}_{ref}}$ or ${ P_i-\Delta{P}_t \over D_{ref} }$ (relative concentration of present parent and non-radiogenic isotope) are measured by mass spectrometry and plotted against each other in a three-isotope plot known as an isochron plot.

If all data points lie on a straight line, this line is called an isochron. The better the fit of the data points to a line, the more reliable the resulting age estimate. Since the ratio of the daughter and non-radiogenic isotopes is proportional to the ratio of the parent and non-radiogenic isotopes, the slope of the isochron gets steeper with time. The change in slope from initial conditions—assuming an initial isochron slope of zero (a horizontal isochron) at the point of intersection (intercept) of the isochron with the y-axis—to the current computed slope gives the age of the rock. The slope of the isochron, $(e^{\lambda t}-1)$ or $\Delta{P}_t \over P-\Delta{P}_t$, represents the ratio of daughter to parent as used in standard radiometric dating and can be derived to calculate the age of the sample at time t. The y-intercept of the isochron line yields the initial radiogenic daughter ratio, $\frac{\mathrm{D_0}}{\mathrm{D}_{ref}}$.

Whole rock isochron dating uses the same ideas but instead of different minerals obtained from one rock uses different types of rocks that are derived from a common reservoir; e.g. the same precursor melt. It is possible to date the differentiation of the precursor melt which then cooled and crystallized into the different types of rocks.

One of the best known isotopic systems for isochron dating is the rubidium–strontium system. Other systems that are used for isochron dating include samarium–neodymium, and uranium–lead. Some isotopic systems based on short-living extinct radionuclides such as ^{53}Mn, ^{26}Al, ^{129}I, ^{60}Fe and others are used for isochron dating of events in the early history of the Solar System. However, methods using extinct radionuclides give only relative ages and have to be calibrated with radiometric dating techniques based on long-living radionuclides like Pb-Pb dating to give absolute ages.

== Application ==
Isochron dating is useful in the determination of the age of igneous rocks, which have their initial origin in the cooling of liquid magma. It is also useful to determine the time of metamorphism, shock events (such as the consequence of an asteroid impact) and other events depending on the behaviour of the particular isotopic systems under such events. It can be used to determine the age of grains in sedimentary rocks and understand their origin by a method known as a provenance study.

== See also ==
- Radiometric dating
