= Chondritic uniform reservoir =

The Chondritic Uniform Reservoir (CHUR) is a scientific model in astrophysics and geochemistry for the mean chemical composition of the part of the Solar Nebula from which, during the formation of the Solar System, chondrites formed. This hypothetical chemical reservoir is thought to have been similar in composition to the current photosphere of the Sun.

When the Sun formed from its protostar, around 4.56 billion years ago, the solar wind caused outward dispersal of gas particles from the central part of the Solar Nebula. In this way, most lighter volatiles (e.g. hydrogen, helium, oxygen, carbon dioxide), that had not yet condensed in the inner, warmer regions of the nebula, were lost. This fractionation process caused the terrestrial planets and asteroid belt to become relatively enriched in heavy elements, with respect to the composition of the Sun and the Jovian gas planets.

Certain type of meteorites, CI-chondrites, have chemical compositions that are almost identical to the solar photosphere, except for the abundances of volatiles. Because the Sun contains 99.86% of the mass of the Solar System, chondrites are considered proxies for the composition of the early solar nebula (with the exception of volatile loss), and are therefore representative of the material from which the terrestrial planets, including the Earth, were formed.

== The CHUR model ==
Through the analysis of isotopic compositions of neodymium, DePaolo and Wasserburg (1976) discovered that terrestrial igneous rocks at the time of their formation from melts closely followed the "chondritic uniform reservoir" or "chondritic unifractionated reservoir" (CHUR) line – the way the ^{143}Nd:^{144}Nd ratio increased with time in chondrites. Chondritic meteorites are thought to represent the earliest (unsorted) material that formed in the Solar System before planets formed. They have relatively homogeneous trace-element signatures, and therefore their isotopic evolution can model the evolution of the whole Solar System and of the "bulk Earth". After plotting the ages and initial ^{143}Nd/^{144}Nd ratios of terrestrial igneous rocks on a Nd evolution vs. time diagram, DePaolo and Wasserburg determined that Archean rocks had initial Nd isotope ratios very similar to that defined by the CHUR evolution line.

=== Epsilon notation ===
Since ^{143}Nd/^{144}Nd departures from the CHUR evolution line are very small, DePaolo and Wasserburg argued that it would be useful to create a form of notation that described ^{143}Nd/^{144}Nd in terms of their deviations from the CHUR evolution line. This is called the epsilon notation, whereby one epsilon unit represents a one part per 10,000 deviation from the CHUR composition. Algebraically, epsilon units can be defined by the equation

$$\varepsilon_{\text{Nd}(t)} = \left[\frac{\left(\frac{^{143}\text{Nd}}{^{144}\text{Nd}}\right)_{\text{sample}(t)}}{\left(\frac{^{143}\text{Nd}}{^{144}\text{Nd}}\right)_{\text{CHUR}(t)}} - 1\right] \times 10\,000.$$

Since epsilon units are finer and therefore a more tangible representation of the initial Nd isotope ratio, by using these instead of the initial isotopic ratios, it is easier to comprehend and therefore compare initial ratios of crust with different ages. In addition, epsilon units will normalize the initial ratios to CHUR, thus eliminating any effects caused by various analytical mass fractionation correction methods applied.

=== Nd model ages ===
Since CHUR defines initial ratios of continental rocks through time, it was deduced that measurements of ^{143}Nd/^{144}Nd and ^{147}Sm/^{144}Nd, with the use of CHUR, could produce model ages for the segregation from the mantle of the melt that formed any crustal rock. This has been termed T_{CHUR}. In order for a T_{CHUR} age to be calculated, fractionation between Nd/Sm would have to have occurred during magma extraction from the mantle to produce a continental rock. This fractionation would then cause a deviation between the crustal and mantle isotopic evolution lines. The intersection between these two evolution lines then indicates the crustal formation age. The T_{CHUR} age is defined by the following equation:

$$T_\text{CHUR} = \left(\frac{1}{\lambda}\right) \ln \left[1 + \frac{\left(\frac{^{143}\text{Nd}}{^{144}\text{Nd}}\right)_\text{sample} - \left(\frac{^{143}\text{Nd}}{^{144}\text{Nd}}\right)_\text{CHUR}}{\left(\frac{^{147}\text{Sm}}{^{144}\text{Nd}}\right)_\text{sample} - \left(\frac{^{147}\text{Sm}}{^{144}\text{Nd}}\right)_\text{CHUR}}\right].$$

The T_{CHUR} age of a rock can yield a formation age for the crust as a whole if the sample has not suffered disturbance after its formation. Since Sm/Nd are rare-earth elements (REE), their characteristically immobile ratios resist partitioning during metamorphism and melting of silicate rocks. This therefore allows crustal formation ages to be calculated, despite any metamorphism the sample has undergone.

== See also ==
- Chondrite
- Nebular hypothesis
