= Mineralizer =

The purpose of a mineralizer is to facilitate the transport of insoluble “nutrient” to a seed crystal by means of a reversible chemical reaction. Over time, the seed crystal accumulates the material that was once in the nutrient and grows. Mineralizers are additives that aid the solubilization of the nutrient solid. When used in small quantities, mineralizers function as catalysts. Typically, a more stable solid is crystallized from a solution that consists of a less stable solid and a solvent. The process is done by dissolution-precipitation or crystallization process.

Hydrothermal growth involves the crystallization of a dissolved solid at elevated temperatures. Often high pressures are involved. Historically, the goal of hydrothermal growth was to grow large crystals. Due to the recent developments in nanotechnology, small nanocrystals are now desired and made by hydrothermal growth with crystal size controlled by mineralizers. Different mineralizers result in crystals of different sizes and shapes. Typical mineralizers are hydroxides (NaOH, KOH, LiOH), carbonates (Na_{2}CO_{3}) and halides (NaF, KF, LiF, NaCl, KCl, LiCl).

== Cation effects ==
Although usually the anion of the mineralizer is most active in dissolving the nutrient material, the cation also exerts an influence in some cases. The mineralizer can interact with impurities on the surface of the crystal and increase the growth rate. For example, the growth rate for sapphire (Al_{2}O_{3}) and zincite (ZnO) in potassium-containing solution (KOH, K_{2}CO_{3}) is higher in comparison to that in sodium-containing solution (NaOH, Na_{2}CO_{3}). This difference is not readily understood, but are attributed the interaction between potassium and an impurity absorbed on the surface.

== Applications ==
=== Synthesis of quartz ===
Basic mineralizers such as NaOH or Na_{2}CO_{3} are used in the hydrothermal growth of quartz crystals. The precursor or nutrient is crushed silica and a solvent. Typical containers are made of air-tight steel cylinders called autoclaves that can withstand high temperature and pressure. In the case of quartz crystals, the container is heated at 300 °C (which produces a pressure of 140 MPA). Without the mineralizer, higher temperatures are required to solubilize silica. Hydroxides and carbonates make silica more soluble by forming water-soluble sodium silicates. Simplified equations can be represented as in the equation below

SiO_{2} + 2 NaOH → Na_{2}SiO_{3} + H_{2}O
SiO_{2} + Na_{2}CO_{3} → Na_{2}SiO_{3} + CO_{2}

Anhydrous sodium silicate is a chain polymeric anion composed of corner shared SiO_{4} tetrahedra. Hydrates form with the formula Na_{2}SiO_{3}•nH_{2}O which contain the discrete, approximately tetrahedral anion SiO_{2}(OH)_{2}^{2−} with waters of hydration. In three-dimensional silica glass, the addition of sodium ions causes oxygen ions formed a bridge, these oxygen ions possess an effective negative charge. The positively charged sodium ions provide partly covalent and partly ionic structure. As the concentration of Na^{+} increases, ionically bound material link and eventually form a network of continuous channels. Once silica is solubilized, components in the nutrient are transferred to the seed crystal, which is held at a cooler temperature than the nutrient, resulting in a high purity quartz crystal.

=== Synthesis of zeolites ===
Hydroxide mineralizers are also used to control the alumina/silica ratio of zeolites. A typical recipe for the production of a zeolite includes the mineralizer, the solvent, the seed crystal, a nutrient consisting of silica (SiO_{2}) and alumina (Al_{2}O_{3}), and a template. Templates are cations that direct the polymerization of the anionic building blocks to form a certain zeolite structure. Different templating cations lead to different zeolite structures. Typical templates include tetramethylammonium (TMA), sodium (Na^{+}) and potassium (K^{+}). Different zeolites can also be formed by changing the ratios of the nutrient source, the type of mineralizer or the temperature and pH of the reaction. At high pH, zeolites with high alumina content are formed, because hydroxides prevent the ability of silica to condense and oligomerize through the reaction shown above. At lower pH, zeolites with high silica content are favored.
