= Rubidium–strontium dating =

Radiometric dating technique for rocks and minerals

The rubidium–strontium dating method (Rb–Sr) is a radiometric dating technique, used by scientists to determine the age of rocks and minerals from their content of specific isotopes of rubidium (^{87}Rb) and strontium (^{87}Sr, ^{86}Sr). One of the two naturally occurring isotopes of rubidium, ^{87}Rb, decays to ^{87}Sr with a half-life of 49.23 billion years. The radiogenic daughter, ^{87}Sr, produced in this decay process is the only one of the four naturally occurring strontium isotopes that was not produced exclusively by stellar nucleosynthesis predating the formation of the Solar System. Over time, decay of ^{87}Rb increases the amount of radiogenic ^{87}Sr while the amount of other Sr isotopes remains unchanged.

The ratio ^{87}Sr/^{86}Sr in a mineral sample can be accurately measured using a mass spectrometer. If the amount of Sr and Rb isotopes in the sample when it formed can be determined, the age can be calculated from the increase in ^{87}Sr/^{86}Sr. Different minerals that crystallized from the same silicic melt will all have the same initial ^{87}Sr/^{86}Sr as the parent melt. However, because Rb substitutes for K in minerals and these minerals have different K/Ca ratios, the minerals will have had different starting Rb/Sr ratios, and the final ^{87}Sr/^{86}Sr ratio will not have increased as much in the minerals poorer in Rb. Typically, Rb/Sr increases in the order plagioclase, hornblende, K-feldspar, biotite, muscovite. Therefore, given sufficient time for significant production (ingrowth) of radiogenic ^{87}Sr, measured ^{87}Sr/^{86}Sr values will be different in the minerals, increasing in the same order. Comparison of different minerals in a rock sample thus allows scientists to infer the original ^{87}Sr/^{86}Sr ratio and determine the age of the rock.

In addition, Rb is a highly incompatible element that, during partial melting of the mantle, prefers to join the magmatic melt rather than remain in mantle minerals. As a result, Rb is enriched in crustal rocks relative to the mantle, and ^{87}Sr/^{86}Sr is higher for crust rock than mantle rock. This allows scientists to distinguish magma produced by melting of crust rock from magma produced by melting of mantle rock, even if subsequent magma differentiation produces similar overall chemistry. Scientists can also estimate from ^{87}Sr/^{86}Sr when crust rock was first formed from magma extracted from the mantle, even if the rock is subsequently metamorphosed or even melted and recrystallized. This provides clues to the age of the Earth's continents.

Development of this process was aided by German/Austrian chemists Lise Meitner, Otto Hahn, and Fritz Strassmann, who discovered nuclear fission in December 1938.

== Example ==
For example, consider the case of an igneous rock such as a granite that contains several major Sr-bearing minerals including plagioclase feldspar, K-feldspar, hornblende, biotite, and muscovite. Each of these minerals has a different initial rubidium/strontium ratio dependent on their potassium content, the concentration of Rb and K in the melt and the temperature at which the minerals formed. Rubidium substitutes for potassium within the lattice of minerals at a rate proportional to its concentration within the melt.

The ideal scenario according to Bowen's reaction series would see a granite melt begin crystallizing a cumulate assemblage of plagioclase and hornblende (i.e.; tonalite or diorite), which is low in K (and hence Rb) but high in Sr (as this substitutes for Ca), which proportionally enriches the melt in K and Rb. This then causes orthoclase and biotite, both K rich minerals into which Rb can substitute, to precipitate. The resulting Rb–Sr ratios and Rb and Sr abundances of both the whole rocks and their component minerals will be markedly different. This, thus, allows a different rate of radiogenic Sr to evolve in the separate rocks and their component minerals as time progresses.

== Calculating the age ==
The age of a sample is determined by analysing several minerals within multiple subsamples from different parts of the original sample. The ^{87}Sr/^{86}Sr ratio for each subsample is plotted against its ^{87}Rb/^{86}Sr ratio on a graph called an isochron. If these form a straight line then the subsamples are consistent, and the age probably reliable. The slope of the line dictates the age of the sample.

Given the universal law of radioactive decay and the following rubidium beta decay: $\ce{^{87}_{37}Rb ->[{\beta^-}]~^{87}_{38}Sr ~+e^-\ + \bar{\nu}_e}$, we obtain the expression which describes the growth of strontium-87 from the decay of rubidium-87:
$$^{87}_{38}\text{Sr}(t)=~^{87}_{38}\text{Sr}(0) +~^{87}_{37}\text{Rb}(e^{\lambda t}-1)\ ,$$
$\ce{\lambda}$ being the decay constant of rubidium. Furthermore, we consider the number of $\ce{^{86}_{38}Sr}$ as a constant, since it is stable and not radiogenic. Hence,
$$\frac{^{87}\text{Sr}}{^{86}\text{Sr}} = \left( \frac{^{87}\text{Sr}}{^{86}\text{Sr}} \right)_0 + \frac{^{87}\text{Rb}}{^{86}\text{Sr}}(e^{\lambda t}-1)$$
is the isochron equation. After measurements of Rubidum and Strontium concentration in the mineral we can easily determine the age, the t value, of the sample.

== Sources of error ==
Rb–Sr dating relies on correctly measuring the Rb–Sr ratio of a mineral or whole rock sample, plus deriving an accurate ^{87}Sr/^{86}Sr ratio for the mineral or whole rock sample.

Several preconditions must be satisfied before a Rb–Sr date can be considered as representing the time of emplacement or formation of a rock.

- The system must have remained closed to Rb and Sr diffusion from the time at which the rock formed or fell below the closure temperature (generally considered to be 650 °C);
- The minerals which are taken from a rock to construct an isochron must have formed in chemical equilibrium with one another or in the case of sediments, be deposited at the same time;
- The rock must not have undergone any metasomatism which could have disturbed the Rb–Sr system either thermally or chemically

One of the major drawbacks (and, conversely, the most important use) of utilizing Rb and Sr to derive a radiometric date is their relative mobility, especially in hydrothermal fluids. Rb and Sr are relatively mobile alkaline elements and as such are relatively easily moved around by the hot, often carbonated hydrothermal fluids present during metamorphism or magmatism.

Conversely, these fluids may metasomatically alter a rock, introducing new Rb and Sr into the rock (generally during potassic alteration or calcic (albitisation) alteration. Rb–Sr can then be used on the altered mineralogy to date the time of this alteration, but not the date at which the rock formed.

Thus, assigning age significance to a result requires studying the metasomatic and thermal history of the rock, any metamorphic events, and any evidence of fluid movement. A Rb–Sr date which is at variance with other geochronometers may not be useless, it may be providing data on an event which is not representing the age of formation of the rock.

== Uses ==
=== Geochronology ===
The Rb–Sr dating method has been used extensively in dating terrestrial and lunar rocks, and meteorites. If the initial amount of Sr is known or can be extrapolated, the age can be determined by measurement of the Rb and Sr concentrations and the ^{87}Sr/^{86}Sr ratio. The dates indicate the true age of the minerals only if the rocks have not been subsequently altered.

The important concept in isotopic tracing is that Sr derived from any mineral through weathering reactions will have the same ^{87}Sr/^{86}Sr as the mineral. Although this is a potential source of error for terrestrial rocks, it is irrelevant for lunar rocks and meteorites, as there are no chemical weathering reactions in those environments.

=== Isotope geochemistry ===
Initial ^{87}Sr/^{86}Sr ratios are a useful tool in archaeology, forensics and paleontology because the ^{87}Sr/^{86}Sr of a skeleton, sea shell or indeed a clay artefact is directly comparable to the source rocks upon which it was formed or upon which the organism lived. Thus, by measuring the current-day ^{87}Sr/^{86}Sr ratio (and often the ^{143}Nd–^{144}Nd ratios as well) the geological fingerprint of an object or skeleton can be measured, allowing migration patterns to be determined.

=== Strontium isotope stratigraphy ===
Strontium isotope stratigraphy relies on recognised variations in the ^{87}Sr/^{86}Sr ratio of seawater over time. The application of Sr isotope stratigraphy is generally limited to carbonate samples for which the Sr seawater curve is well defined. This is well known for the Cenozoic time-scale but, due to poorer preservation of carbonate sequences in the Mesozoic and earlier, it is not completely understood for older sequences. In older sequences diagenetic alteration combined with greater uncertainties in estimating absolute ages due to lack of overlap between other geochronometers (for example U–Th) leads to greater uncertainties in the exact shape of the Sr isotope seawater curve.

== See also ==
- Radiometric dating
