= Lutetium =

Lutetium, _{71}Lu
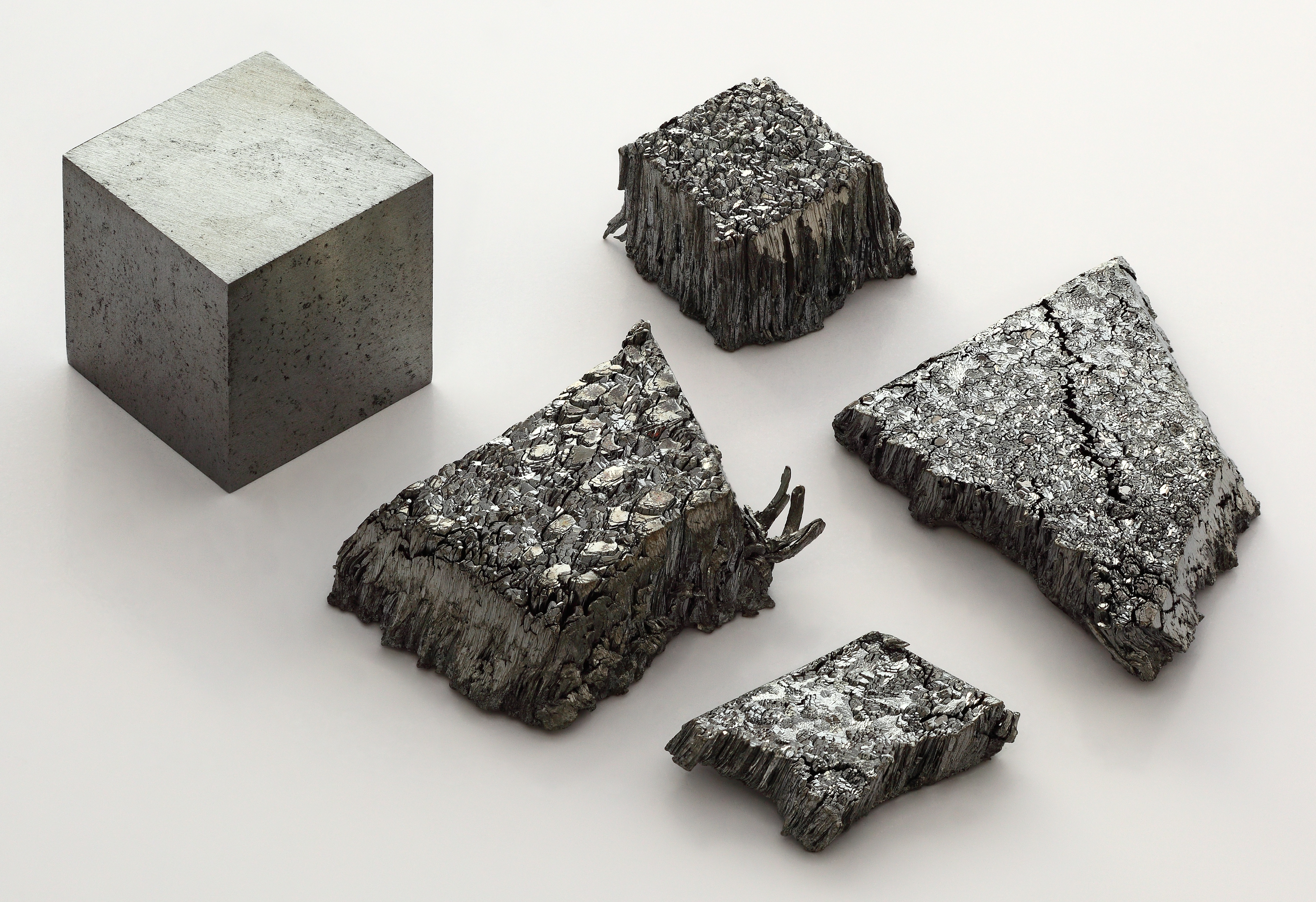

Lutetium
- Pronunciation: /ljuːˈtiːʃiəm/ (lew-TEE-shee-əm)
- Appearance: silvery white

Standard atomic weight A_{r}°(Lu)
- 174.96669±0.00005; 174.97±0.01 (abridged)

Lutetium in the periodic table
Hydrogen																															Helium
Lithium	Beryllium																									Boron	Carbon	Nitrogen	Oxygen	Fluorine	Neon
Sodium	Magnesium																									Aluminium	Silicon	Phosphorus	Sulfur	Chlorine	Argon
Potassium	Calcium															Scandium	Titanium	Vanadium	Chromium	Manganese	Iron	Cobalt	Nickel	Copper	Zinc	Gallium	Germanium	Arsenic	Selenium	Bromine	Krypton
Rubidium	Strontium															Yttrium	Zirconium	Niobium	Molybdenum	Technetium	Ruthenium	Rhodium	Palladium	Silver	Cadmium	Indium	Tin	Antimony	Tellurium	Iodine	Xenon
Caesium	Barium	Lanthanum	Cerium	Praseodymium	Neodymium	Promethium	Samarium	Europium	Gadolinium	Terbium	Dysprosium	Holmium	Erbium	Thulium	Ytterbium	Lutetium	Hafnium	Tantalum	Tungsten	Rhenium	Osmium	Iridium	Platinum	Gold	Mercury (element)	Thallium	Lead	Bismuth	Polonium	Astatine	Radon
Francium	Radium	Actinium	Thorium	Protactinium	Uranium	Neptunium	Plutonium	Americium	Curium	Berkelium	Californium	Einsteinium	Fermium	Mendelevium	Nobelium	Lawrencium	Rutherfordium	Dubnium	Seaborgium	Bohrium	Hassium	Meitnerium	Darmstadtium	Roentgenium	Copernicium	Nihonium	Flerovium	Moscovium	Livermorium	Tennessine	Oganesson
Y
↑
Lu
↓
Lr
ytterbium ← lutetium → hafnium
- Atomic number (Z): 71
- Group: group 3
- Period: period 6
- Block: d-block
- Electron configuration: [Xe] 4f^{14} 5d^{1} 6s^{2}
- Electrons per shell: 2, 8, 18, 32, 9, 2

Physical properties
- Phase at STP: solid
- Melting point: 1925 K (1652 °C, 3006 °F)
- Boiling point: 3675 K (3402 °C, 6156 °F)
- Density (at 20° C): 9.840 g/cm^{3}
- when liquid (at m.p.): 9.3 g/cm^{3}
- Heat of fusion: ca. 22 kJ/mol
- Heat of vaporization: 414 kJ/mol
- Molar heat capacity: 26.86 J/(mol·K)
- Specific heat capacity: 153.512 J/(kg·K)
Vapor pressure
P (Pa)	1	10	100	1 k	10 k	100 k
at T (K)	1906	2103	2346	(2653)	(3072)	(3663)

Atomic properties
- Oxidation states: common: +3; 0, +2
- Electronegativity: Pauling scale: 1.27
- Ionization energies: 1st: 523.5 kJ/mol; 2nd: 1340 kJ/mol; 3rd: 2022.3 kJ/mol
- Atomic radius: empirical: 174 pm
- Covalent radius: 187±8 pm
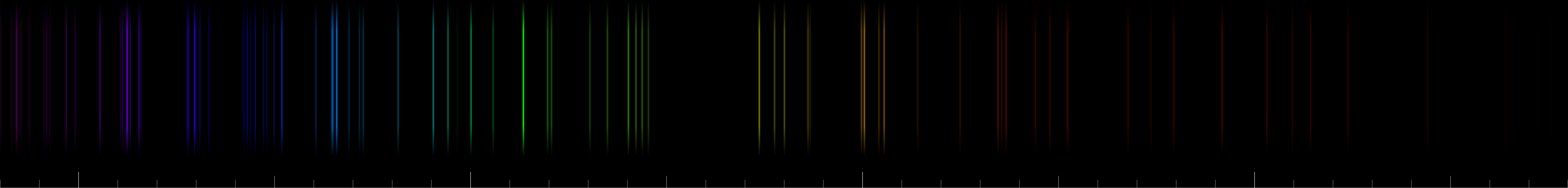
- Spectral lines of lutetium

Other properties
- Natural occurrence: primordial
- Crystal structure: hexagonal close-packed (hcp) (hP2)
- Lattice constants: a = 350.53 pm c = 554.93 pm (at 20 °C)
- Thermal expansion: poly: 9.9 µm/(m⋅K) (at r.t.)
- Thermal conductivity: 16.4 W/(m⋅K)
- Electrical resistivity: poly: 582 nΩ⋅m (at r.t.)
- Magnetic ordering: paramagnetic
- Young's modulus: 68.6 GPa
- Shear modulus: 27.2 GPa
- Bulk modulus: 47.6 GPa
- Poisson ratio: 0.261
- Vickers hardness: 755–1160 MPa
- Brinell hardness: 890–1300 MPa
- CAS Number: 7439-94-3

History
- Naming: after Lutetia, Latin for: Paris, in the Roman era
- Discovery: Carl Auer von Welsbach and Georges Urbain (1906)
- First isolation: 1953
- Named by: Georges Urbain (1906)

Isotopes of lutetium
Main isotopes			Decay	
Isotope	abundance	half-life (t_{1/2})	mode	product
^{173}Lu	synth	1.37 y	ε	^{173}Yb
^{174}Lu	synth	3.31 y	β^{+}	^{174}Yb
^{175}Lu	97.401%	stable		
^{176}Lu	2.599%	3.701×10^{10} y	β^{−}	^{176}Hf
^{177}Lu	synth	6.6443 d	β^{−}	^{177}Hf

Lutetium is a chemical element; it has symbol Lu and atomic number 71. It is a silvery white metal which resists corrosion in dry air, but not in moist air. Lutetium is the last element in the lanthanide series, and it is traditionally counted among the rare earth elements; it can also be classified as the first element of the sixth-period transition metals.

Lutetium was independently discovered in 1907 by French scientist Georges Urbain, Austrian mineralogist Baron Carl Auer von Welsbach, and American chemist Charles James. All of these researchers found lutetium as an impurity in ytterbium. The dispute on the priority of the discovery occurred shortly after, with Urbain and Welsbach accusing each other of publishing results influenced by the published research of the other; the naming honor went to Urbain, as he had published his results earlier. He chose the name lutecium for the new element honoring the Latin name for Paris, Lutetia. In 1949 the spelling was changed to lutetium. In 1909, the priority was finally granted to Urbain and his names were adopted as official ones; however, the name cassiopeium (or later cassiopium) for element 71 proposed by Welsbach was used by many German scientists until the 1950s.

Lutetium is not a particularly abundant element, although it is significantly more common than silver in the Earth's crust. It has few specific uses. Lutetium-176 is a relatively abundant (2.6%) radioisotope with a half-life of about 38 billion years, used to determine the age of minerals and meteorites. Lutetium usually occurs in association with the element yttrium and is sometimes used in metal alloys and as a catalyst in various chemical reactions. ^{177}Lu-DOTA-TATE is used for radionuclide therapy (see Nuclear medicine) on neuroendocrine tumours. Lutetium has the highest Brinell hardness of any lanthanide, at 890–1300 MPa.

== Characteristics ==
=== Physical properties ===
A lutetium atom has 71 electrons, arranged in the configuration [Xe] 4f^{14}5d^{1}6s^{2}. Lutetium is generally encountered in the +3 oxidation state, having lost its two outermost 6s and the single 5d-electron. The lutetium atom is the smallest among the lanthanide atoms, due to the lanthanide contraction, and as a result lutetium has the highest density, melting point, and hardness of the lanthanides. As lutetium's 4f orbitals are highly stabilized only the 5d and 6s orbitals are involved in chemical reactions and bonding; thus it is characterized as a d-block rather than an f-block element, and on this basis some consider it not to be a lanthanide at all, but a transition metal like its lighter congeners scandium and yttrium.

=== Chemical properties and compounds ===
Lutetium's compounds almost always contain the element in the +3 oxidation state. Aqueous solutions of most lutetium salts are colorless and form white crystalline solids upon drying, with the common exception of the iodide, which is brown. The soluble salts, such as nitrate, sulfate and acetate form hydrates upon crystallization. The oxide, hydroxide, fluoride, carbonate, phosphate and oxalate are insoluble in water.

Lutetium metal is slightly unstable in air at standard conditions, but it burns readily at 150 °C to form lutetium oxide. The resulting compound is known to absorb water and carbon dioxide, and it may be used to remove vapors of these compounds from closed atmospheres. Similar observations are made during reaction between lutetium and water (slow when cold and fast when hot); lutetium hydroxide is formed in the reaction. Lutetium metal is known to react with the four lightest halogens to form trihalides; except the fluoride they are soluble in water.

Lutetium dissolves readily in weak acids and dilute sulfuric acid to form solutions containing the colorless lutetium ions, which are coordinated by between seven and nine water molecules, the average being [Lu(H_{2}O)_{8.2}]^{3+}.

2 Lu + 3 H_{2}SO_{4} → 2 Lu^{3+} + 3 SO_{4}^{2−} + 3 H_{2}↑

=== Isotopes ===
Lutetium occurs on the Earth in two isotopes: lutetium-175 and lutetium-176. Out of these two, only the former is stable, making the element monoisotopic. The latter one, lutetium-176, decays via beta decay with a half-life of 3.70×10^{10} years; it makes up about 2.6% of natural lutetium.

To date, 40 synthetic radioisotopes of the element have been characterized, ranging in mass number from 149 to 188; the most stable such isotopes are lutetium-174 with a half-life of 3.31 years, and lutetium-173 with a half-life of 1.37 years. All of the remaining radioactive isotopes have half-lives that are less than 9 days, and the majority of these have half-lives that are less than half an hour. Isotopes lighter than the stable lutetium-175 decay via electron capture (to produce isotopes of ytterbium), with some alpha and positron emission; the heavier isotopes decay primarily via beta decay, producing hafnium isotopes. Experiments at the Facility for Rare Isotope Beams have reported lutetium-190 in fragments of platinum-198 colliding with a carbon target.

The element also has 43 known nuclear isomers, of which the most stable of them are lutetium-177m3, with a half-life of 160.4 days, and lutetium-174m with a half-life of 142 days; longer than the ground states of all lutetium isotopes except 173-176.

== History ==
Three scientists were involved in the discovery of lutetium: French scientist Georges Urbain, Austrian mineralogist Baron Carl Auer von Welsbach, and American chemist Charles James. They found lutetium as an impurity in ytterbia, which was thought by Swiss chemist Jean Charles Galissard de Marignac to consist entirely of ytterbium. Of the three, Urbain was the first to publish, followed by Welsbach; James was about to publish when he learned of Urbain's work, and thereafter gave up his claim and did not publish. Despite staying out of the priority argument, James worked on a much larger scale and possessed the largest supply of lutetium at the time.

Urbain and Welsbach proposed different names. Urbain chose neoytterbium for ytterbium and lutecium for the new element. Welsbach chose aldebaranium and cassiopeium (after Aldebaran and Cassiopeia). Both authors accused the other man of publishing results based on their work. The International Commission on Atomic Weights, which was then responsible for the attribution of new element names, settled the dispute in 1909 by granting priority to Urbain and adopting his choice for a name, one derived from the Latin Lutetia (Paris). This decision was based on the fact that the separation of lutetium from Marignac's ytterbium was first described by Urbain. Welsbach had achieved the separation before Urbain, but Urbain had published 44 days earlier. Since Urbain was on the commission which made the decision, its objectivity could be questioned; furthermore, Welsbach protested that Urbain's spectral evidence was weak and argued that his rival's lutetium was very impure, but to no avail. After Urbain's names were recognized, neoytterbium was reverted to ytterbium.

The controversy died down after 1910, only to be reignited with the discovery of element 72. Urbain claimed in 1911 to have discovered a new rare earth named celtium and identified it as element 72. However, Niels Bohr had demonstrated from his quantum theory that element 72 had to be a group 4 element and not a rare earth, and based on an idea by Fritz Paneth, Bohr's friend George de Hevesy worked with Dirk Coster to search for it in zirconium minerals. This they succeeded in doing, discovering hafnium in 1923. This discovery announcement, being in direct conflict with Urbain's celtium, ignited a controversy on element 72 throughout the 1920s; the resulting investigations on the nature of Urbain's celtium, since it was not the same as hafnium, reopened the case on element 71.

The physicists Hans M. Hansen and Sven Werner, at Bohr's Copenhagen institute, found in 1923 that Welsbach's 1907 samples of cassiopeium had been pure element 71, while Urbain's 1907 lutecium samples only contained traces of element 71 and his 1911 samples identified as celtium were actually pure element 71 – confirming Welsbach's criticism. The Copenhagen physicists then started a campaign to re-award priority for element 71 to Welsbach and replace the name lutetium with cassiopeium, writing to Welsbach in 1923 of their intentions. This campaign encountered success in the physics literature, but in spite of strong German and Scandinavian support for cassiopeium, lutetium remained embedded in most of the chemical literature, with the International Commission on Atomic Weights in 1930 accepting that element 72 was hafnium but using lutetium for element 71.

In 1949, it was decided by the International Union of Pure and Applied Chemistry to recommend the name lutetium, since cassiopeium by then was only used in German and sometimes Dutch, and it was a difficult name to adapt to other languages. It was nonetheless clarified that this was not intended as a statement on priority. Urbain's spelling lutecium was changed to lutetium, in order to derive the name from Latin Lutetia instead of French Lutèce. Pure lutetium metal was first produced in 1953.

== Occurrence and production ==
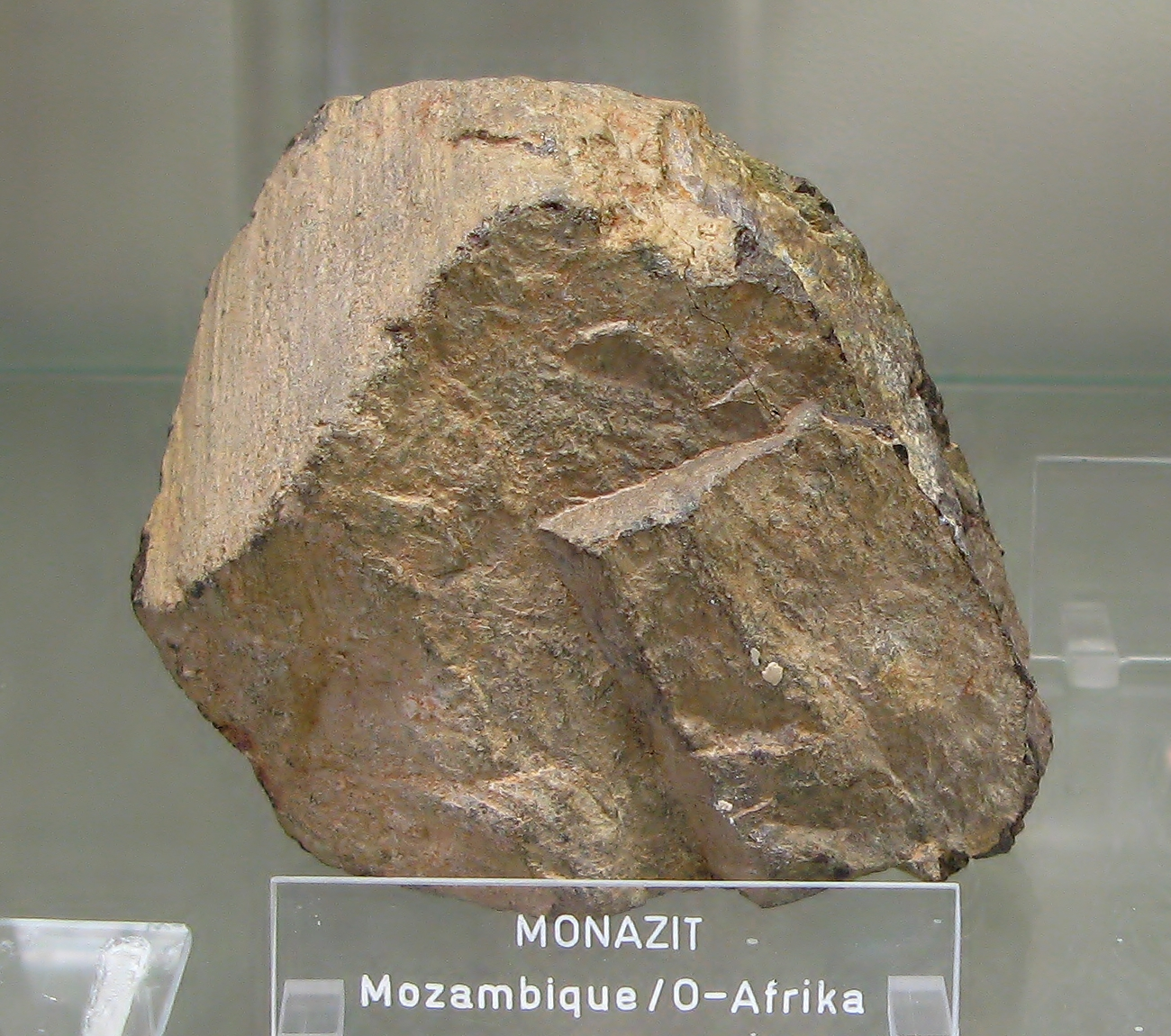
Monazite

Found with almost all other rare-earth metals but never by itself, lutetium is very difficult to separate from other elements. Its principal commercial source is as a by-product from the processing of the rare earth phosphate mineral monazite (Ce,La,...)PO_{4}, which has concentrations of only 0.0001% of the element, not much higher than the abundance of lutetium in the Earth crust of about 0.5 mg/kg. No lutetium-dominant minerals are currently known. The main mining areas are China, United States, Brazil, India, Sri Lanka and Australia. The world production of lutetium (in the form of oxide) is about 10 tonnes per year. Pure lutetium metal is very difficult to prepare. It is one of the rarest and most expensive of the rare earth metals with the price about US$10,000 per kilogram, or about one-fourth that of gold.

Crushed minerals are treated with hot concentrated sulfuric acid to produce water-soluble sulfates of rare earths. Thorium precipitates out of solution as hydroxide and is removed. After that the solution is treated with ammonium oxalate to convert rare earths into their insoluble oxalates. The oxalates are converted to oxides by annealing. The oxides are dissolved in nitric acid that excludes one of the main components, cerium, whose oxide is insoluble in HNO_{3}. Several rare earth metals, including lutetium, are separated as a double salt with ammonium nitrate by crystallization. Lutetium is separated by ion exchange. In this process, rare-earth ions are adsorbed onto suitable ion-exchange resin by exchange with hydrogen, ammonium or cupric ions present in the resin. Lutetium salts are then selectively washed out by suitable complexing agent. Lutetium metal is then obtained by reduction of anhydrous LuCl_{3} or LuF_{3} by either an alkali metal or alkaline earth metal.

2 LuCl_{3} + 3 Ca → 2 Lu + 3 CaCl_{2}

^{177}Lu is produced by neutron activation of ^{176}Lu or by indirectly by neutron activation of ^{176}Yb followed by beta decay. The 6.693-day half-life allows transport from the production reactor to the point of use without significant loss in activity.

== Applications ==
There are few commercial uses specific to natural lutetium, and all of them involve small quantities.

=== Stable isotopes ===
Stable lutetium can be used as catalysts in petroleum cracking in refineries and can also be used in alkylation, hydrogenation, and polymerization applications.

Lutetium aluminium garnet (Al_{5}Lu_{3}O_{12}) has been proposed for use as a lens material in high refractive index immersion lithography. Additionally, a tiny amount of lutetium is added as a dopant to gadolinium gallium garnet, which was used in magnetic bubble memory devices. Cerium-doped lutetium oxyorthosilicate is currently the preferred compound for detectors in positron emission tomography (PET). Lutetium aluminium garnet (LuAG) is used as a phosphor in light-emitting diode light bulbs.

Lutetium tantalate (LuTaO_{4}) is the densest known stable white material (density 9.81 g/cm^{3}) and therefore is an ideal host for X-ray phosphors. The only denser white material is thorium dioxide, with density of 10 g/cm^{3}, but the thorium it contains is radioactive.

Lutetium is also a compound of several scintillating materials, which convert X-rays to visible light. It is part of LYSO, LuAG and lutetium iodide scintillators.

Research indicates that lutetium-ion atomic clocks could provide greater accuracy than any existing atomic clock. Lutetium-176 atomic clocks have accuracy verified up to 19 decimal places.

=== Unstable isotopes ===
The suitable half-life and decay mode made lutetium-176 used as a pure beta emitter, using lutetium which has been exposed to neutron activation, and in lutetium–hafnium dating to date meteorites.

The isotope ^{177}Lu emits low-energy beta particles and gamma rays and has a half-life around 7 days, positive characteristics for commercial applications, especially in therapeutic nuclear medicine. The synthetic isotope lutetium-177 bound to octreotate (a somatostatin analogue), is used experimentally in targeted radionuclide therapy for neuroendocrine tumors. Lutetium-177 is used as a radionuclide in neuroendocrine tumor therapy and bone pain palliation.

Lutetium (^{177}Lu) vipivotide tetraxetan is a therapy for prostate cancer, FDA approved in 2022.

== Precautions ==
Like other rare-earth metals, lutetium is regarded as having a low degree of toxicity, but its compounds should be handled with care nonetheless: for example, lutetium fluoride inhalation is dangerous and the compound irritates skin. Lutetium nitrate may be dangerous as it may explode and burn once heated. Lutetium oxide powder is toxic as well if inhaled or ingested.

Similarly to the other rare-earth metals, lutetium has no known biological role, but it is found even in humans, concentrating in bones, and to a lesser extent in the liver and kidneys. Lutetium salts are known to occur together with other lanthanide salts in nature; the element is the least abundant in the human body of all lanthanides. Human diets have not been monitored for lutetium content, so it is not known how much the average human takes in, but estimations show the amount is only about several micrograms per year, all coming from tiny amounts absorbed by plants. Soluble lutetium salts are mildly toxic, but insoluble ones are not.
