= Lutetium(III) oxide =

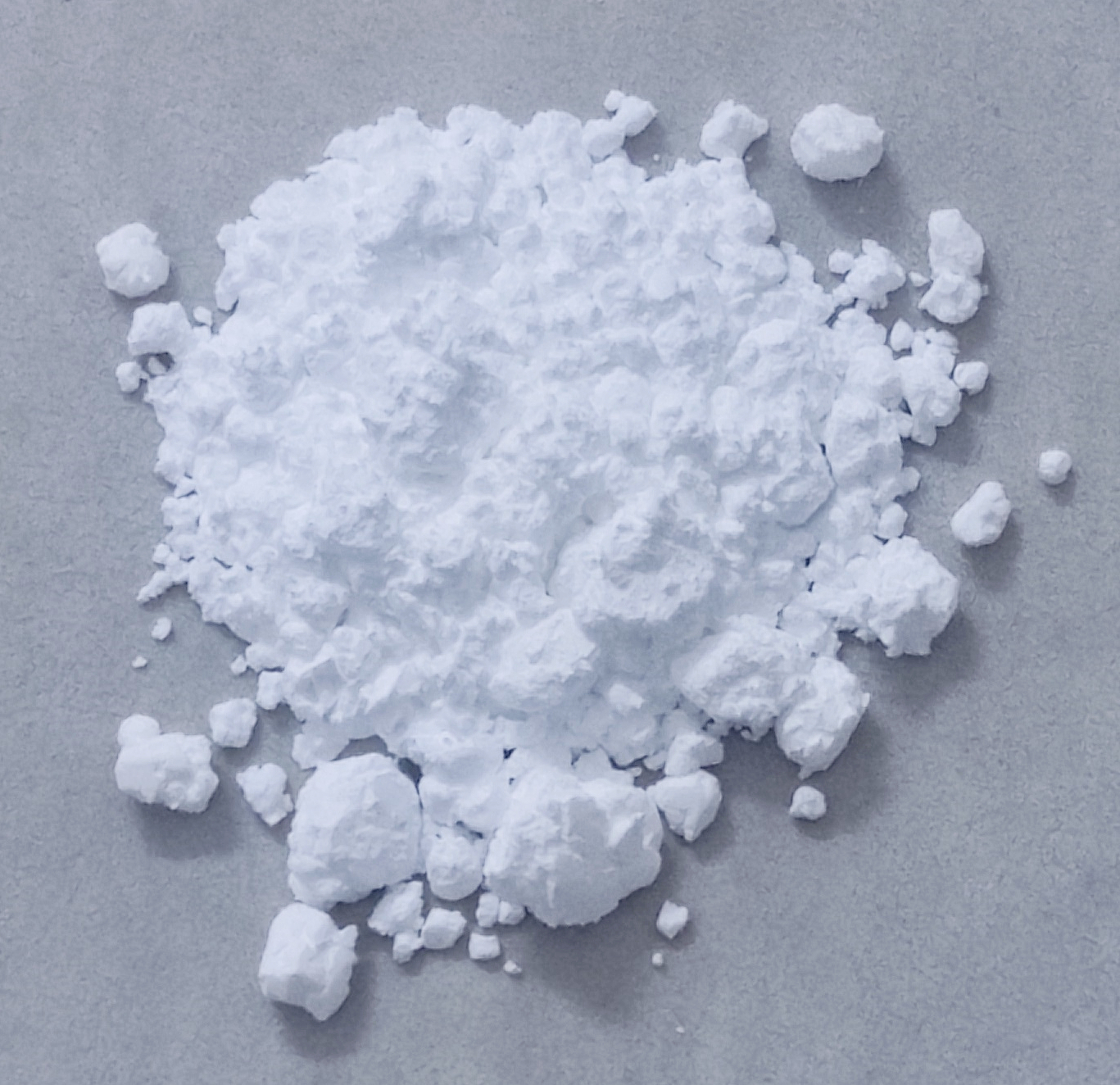
- Lutetium(III) oxide

Names
- Other names Lutetium oxide, Lutetium sesquioxide

Identifiers
CAS Number	12032-20-1
3D model (JSmol)	Interactive image
ChemSpider	140183
ECHA InfoCard	100.031.591
EC Number	234-764-3
PubChem CID	159406
CompTox Dashboard (EPA)	DTXSID60894260
- InChI: InChI=1S/2Lu.3O/q2*+3;3*-2 Key: UGBIHFMRUDAMBY-UHFFFAOYSA-N
- SMILES: [Lu+3].[O-2].[O-2].[Lu+3].[O-2]

Properties
Chemical formula	Lu_{2}O_{3}
Molar mass	397.932 g/mol
Melting point	2,490 °C (4,510 °F; 2,760 K)
Boiling point	3,980 °C (7,200 °F; 4,250 K)
Solubility in other solvents	Insoluble
Band gap	5.5 eV

Structure
Crystal structure	Bixbyite
Space group	Ia3̅ (No. 206)

Thermochemistry
Std enthalpy of formation (Δ_{f}H^{⦵}_{298})	448.9 kcal/mol
Gibbs free energy (Δ_{f}G^{⦵})	427.5 kcal/mol

Related compounds
Other anions	Lutetium(III) chloride
Other cations	Scandium(III) oxide Yttrium(III) oxide

Supplementary data page
- Lutetium(III) oxide (data page)
- Except where otherwise noted, data are given for materials in their standard state (at 25 °C [77 °F], 100 kPa). verify (what is ?) Infobox references

Lutetium(III) oxide, a white solid, is a cubic compound of lutetium sometimes used in the preparation of specialty glasses. It is also called lutecia. It is a lanthanide oxide, also known as a rare earth.

== History ==
In 1879, Swiss chemist Jean Charles Galissard de Marignac (1817–1894) claimed to have discovered ytterbium, but he had found a mixture of elements. In 1907, French chemist Georges Urbain (1872–1938) reported that ytterbium was a mixture of two new elements and was not a single element. Two other chemists, Carl Auer von Welsbach (1858–1929) and Charles James (1880–1926) also extracted lutetium(III) oxide around the same time. All three scientists successfully separated Marignac's ytterbia into oxides of two elements which were eventually named ytterbium and lutetium). None of these chemists were able to isolate pure lutetium. James' separation was of very high quality, but Urbain and Auer von Welsbach published before him.

== Uses ==
Lutetium(III) oxide is an important raw material for laser crystals. It also has specialized uses in ceramics, glass, phosphors, and lasers. Lutetium(III) oxide is used as a catalyst in cracking, alkylation, hydrogenation, and polymerization. The band gap of lutetium oxide is 5.5 eV.
