= Deaths in September 1979 =

The following is a list of notable deaths in September 1979. Entries for each day are listed alphabetically by surname. A typical entry lists information in the following sequence:

- Name, age, country of citizenship at birth, subsequent country of citizenship (if applicable), reason for notability, cause of death (if known), and reference.

== September 1979 ==
=== 1 ===
- Chang Wei-han, 92, Taiwanese politician, pneumonia.
- Mick Cronin, 68, Australian footballer.
- Indira Devi of Kapurthala, 67, Indian radio presenter and royal.
- Vincent Drouin, 47, Canadian politician, MP (1962–1965), seaplane crash.
- Arthur Edwards, 77, Australian rugby player.
- Buck Ewing, 76, American baseball player.
- Doris Kenyon, 81, American actress, cardiac arrest.
- John McKnight, 73, American politician, member of the Nebraska Legislature (1947–1952).
- Stanley R. Mullard, 95, English businessman.
- Brownie Pūriri, 55, New Zealand public servant and politician.
- Aaron Rosenberg, 67, American film producer and football player.
- Keith Russell, 63, British-Ugandan Anglican prelate.
- Sir Eric Sachs, 81, British jurist.

=== 2 ===
- Sir Felix Aylmer, 90, English actor.
- Ewan Davies, 92, Welsh rugby player.
- Jacques Février, 79, French pianist, injuries sustained in a traffic collision.
- Mike Peppe, 81, American swim coach, cancer.
- Otto P. Weyland, 76, American general, stroke.

=== 3 ===
- David V. Anderson, 79, American politician.
- Geoffrey Barkas, 83, English filmmaker.
- Homer E. Capehart, 82, American politician, member of the U.S. Senate (1945–1963), complications from a fall.
- William Eddie, 87, Scottish cricketer.
- Nikolai Gusarov, 61, Soviet flying ace.
- James Higgs-Walker, 87, English cricketer.
- Philip Hope-Wallace, 67, English music and theatre critic.
- Lim Cheng Hoe, 67, Singaporean painter, stomach cancer.
- Kay Lund, 67, German tennis player.
- John L. McMillan, 81, American politician, member of the U.S. House of Representatives (1939–1973), prostate cancer.
- Hugh Morrison, 60, Scottish-New Zealand weightlifter and coach.
- Wincenty Okołowicz, 73, Polish geographer.
- Juan Pablo Pérez Alfonzo, 75, Venezuelan politician and diplomat, developer of OPEC, pancreatic cancer.
- Gordon Rawcliffe, 69, British electrical engineer, heart attack.
- Lo Tui, 71, Estonian actress, director and costume designer.
- Simeon Yankov, 80, Bulgarian footballer.

=== 4 ===
- Archibald S. Alexander, 72, American civil servant and politician.
- Sir Richard Anderson, 72, British general.
- Guy Bolton, 94, British-American playwright.
- Canuplin, 75, Filipino actor and magician.
- Sefton Delmer, 75, British journalist.
- Francisco Gibert, 79, Spanish Olympic water polo player (1920, 1924).
- Wallace Le Patourel, 63, British soldier.
- Ernest Peppiatt, 62, British Olympic weightlifter (1948).
- Turkey Stearnes, 78, American baseball player, complications from stomach surgery.
- Frank William Towey Jr., 83, American politician, member of the U.S. House of Representatives (1937–1939).

=== 5 ===
- John Bradburne, 58, English Roman Catholic priest and poet, shot.
- Joseph T. Coleman, 66, American football player and coach, heart attack.
- Alberto di Jorio, 95, Italian Roman Catholic cardinal.
- Roman Ghirshman, 83, Russian-born French archaeologist, stroke.
- Georg Gruber, 75, Austrian-South African musicologist.
- Kostas Koligiannis, 70, Greek politician.
- Nora Platiel, 83, German politician.
- Pierre Pouyade, 68, French general and flying ace, cancer.
- Ray Rosbrook, 69, Australian basketball coach.
- Bruno Sander, 95, Austrian geologist.
- Nat Simon, 70, American composer ("Istanbul (Not Constantinople)", "The Old Lamp-Lighter").
- Sōfū Teshigahara, 78, Japanese floral designer.
- Hermann von Wissmann, 84, German-Austrian explorer and geographer.

=== 6 ===
- Ronald Binge, 69, British composer, liver cancer.
- Joachim Jeremias, 78, German theologian.
- Dimitrios Koukoulitsios, 19, Greek footballer, traffic collision.
- Emil Krieger, 76, German sculptor.
- Dimitrios Mousiaris, 20, Greek footballer, traffic collision.
- Steve Sullivan, 82, American boxer.
- Gertrude L. Warren, 94, American youth development activist (4-H).

=== 7 ===
- Alan Browning, 53, English actor, liver disease.
- Robert Carr, 62, English rugby player.
- Fu Ying, 77, Chinese chemist.
- Léon Laleau, 87, Haitian writer and diplomat.
- Janardan Navle, 76, Indian cricketer.
- I. A. Richards, 86, English literary critic.
- Sam Rowbotham, 66, English footballer.
- Sir Kenneth Wheare, 72, Australian political scientist and academic administrator.
- Percy Wilson, 80, American baseball player.

=== 8 ===
- Dora Bianka, 82–83, Polish painter.
- Princess Hilda of Luxembourg, 82, Luxembourgian royal.
- Rick Joseph, 40, Dominican baseball player, complications from diabetes.
- Bill Mahon, 69, Australian rugby player.
- Eberhard Schymik, 45, German footballer, cardiac arrest.
- Vidoe Smilevski, 64, Macedonian politician, president (1950–1951, 1963–1969, since 1974), heart attack.
- Billy Taylor, 36, Canadian ice hockey player, heart disease.
- Mario Tozzi, 83, Italian painter.

=== 9 ===
- C. Canby Balderston, 82, American economist, heart disease.
- Max Carriker, 58, American politician, member of the Texas House of Representatives (1959–1965).
- Joaquín Fernández Fernández, 87, Chilean diplomat and politician.
- Marianne Kreidl, 94, Czech-American chemist.
- Roy E. Larsen, 80, American publishing executive (Time Inc.).
- André Meyer, 81, French-American banker, heart disease.
- Norrie Paramor, 65, British record producer and composer.
- Joel Sayre, 78, American journalist and screenwriter, heart failure.
- Mahmoud Taleghani, 68, Iranian ayatollah and revolutionary.
- Ronnie Taylor, 58, English screenwriter.
- Ali-Naqi Vaziri, 92, Iranian composer.
- Colette Vivier, 81, French author.
- Wilbur Ware, 56, American jazz bassist, emphysema.

=== 10 ===
- Franklin Adreon, 76, American film and television producer.
- Eduardo Astengo, 70, Peruvian footballer.
- Babe Bagby, 67, American baseball player.
- Gilbert Cook, 68, English cricketer and rugby player.
- Stanley Engelhart, 69, English Olympic runner (1932).
- Charles Fauvel, 74, French aircraft designer, plane crash.
- Stanislav Lyudkevych, 100, Soviet composer.
- Walter Massop, 71, Dutch Olympic wrestler (1928).
- Solon Michaelides, 73, Greek composer and musicologist.
- Agostinho Neto, 56, Angolan politician, president (since 1975), pancreatic cancer.
- Ādolfs Sīmanis, 70, Latvian footballer.
- Victor Wood, 93, Canadian curler.

=== 11 ===
- Ignacio Agirrezabala, 70, Spanish footballer.
- Laurie Banfield, 89, English footballer.
- Walter Bennett, 73, Australian rugby player.
- W. S. Bristowe, 78, English arachnologist.
- Jesus Crespo, 80, Portuguese footballer.
- Henry B. Hucles, 81, American college sports coach.
- Aleksei Kapler, 75, Soviet filmmaker.
- Stephen Hemsley Longrigg, 86, British businessman and historian.
- Bert Pratten, 87, Australian cricketer.
- Xanti Schawinsky, 75, Swiss painter and theatre designer.
- James Tringrove, 71, Australian cricketer.

=== 12 ===
- Les Clark, 71, American animator (Cinderella, Pinocchio, Lady and the Tramp), lung cancer.
- Edward Dearman, 75, English tennis player.
- Agop Dilâçar, 84, Turkish linguist.
- Homer Maxwell Keever, 74, American historian.
- Jocelyne LaGarde, 55, French Polynesian actress (Hawaii), complications from diabetes.
- Stanley Levison, 67, American businessman and civil rights activist, cancer.
- Josef Müller, 81, German politician.
- Sara Mustonen, 16, Finnish skier, fall.
- Denis Smith, 72, English cricketer.
- Laly Soldevila, 46, Spanish actress.
- Carl Theodor Sørensen, 86, Danish landscape architect.

=== 13 ===
- Queen Damit of Brunei, 55, Bruneian royal, queen consort (1950–1967).
- Gino de Giorgi, 65, Italian naval admiral.
- Solomon Lutnick, 51, American historian.
- Oscar Masotta, 49, Argentine psychoanalyst and translator.
- Joseph Solvinto, 77, French Olympic boxer (1920).
- Sir Raymond Streat, 82, British businessman.
- Hap Ward, 93, American baseball player.

=== 14 ===
- I. A. Cader, 62, Sri Lankan politician and jurist, MP (1960–1965, 1970–1977).
- Panchito Cao, 58, Argentine clarinetist and composer.
- Pastora Imperio, 92, Spanish flamenco dancer.
- P. J. Keenan, 66, American politician, member of the Montana Senate (1967–1974), heart attack.
- Semage Salman Kulatileke, 72, Sri Lankan politician, MP (1970–1972).
- O'Donell Lorenzo, 69, Spanish footballer.
- Raymond Loucheur, 80, French composer.
- Rod McLean, 63, Australian footballer.
- Ivan Palmaw, 82, Russian-American architect.
- Pál Pátzay, 82, Hungarian sculptor.
- Henry Theak, 70, Australian cricketer.

=== 15 ===
- Bill Ashdown, 80, English cricketer.
- José M. Cabanillas, 77, American naval admiral.
- Max Christiansen-Clausen, 80, German radio operator.
- Robert L. Fortes, 37, American politician, member of the Massachusetts House of Representatives (since 1975), heart attack.
- Don Carlin Gunawardena, 80, Sri Lankan botanist.
- Albert E. Kahn, 67, English-born American journalist and author, heart attack.
- Tommy Leonetti, 50, American singer and songwriter, cancer.
- John A. Macready, 91, American aviator.
- Poul Müller, 69, Danish actor.
- Abe Murdock, 86, American politician, member of the U.S. House of Representatives (1933–1941) and Senate (1941–1947), respiratory failure.
- Filippo Sgarlata, 77, Tunisian-born Italian sculptor.
- Caro van Eyck, 63, Dutch actress.

=== 16 ===
- Vincent John Baldwin, 72, American Roman Catholic prelate.
- Elizabeth Coxhead, 70, English novelist, suicide.
- Charlie Deal, 87, American baseball player.
- Mohammad Nur Ahmad Etemadi, 58, Afghan politician, prime minister (1967–1971), executed.
- Robert Freeth, 93, Australian Anglican prelate.
- Marion Cameron Gray, 77, Scottish mathematician.
- Nat Hickey, 77, Croatian-born American basketball player and coach.
- Rolly Huard, 77, Canadian ice hockey player.
- Peveril Meigs, 76, American geographer.
- Tomás Navarro Tomás, 95, Spanish linguist.
- Enoch Olinga, 53, Ugandan Baháʼí leader, shot.
- Gio Ponti, 87, Italian architect and furniture designer.
- Rob Slotemaker, 50, Dutch racing driver, racing collision.

=== 17 ===
- Benjamin Bathurst, 2nd Viscount Bledisloe, 79, British barrister and hereditary peer, member of the House of Lords (since 1958).
- Edgar Chester-Master, 91, English cricketer.
- William Edward China, 83, English entomologist.
- Charles Fahy, 87, American jurist, solicitor general (1941–1945, lung cancer.
- Willis Goldbeck, 80, American filmmaker, heart attack.
- Roger Heim, 79, French botanist.
- Miloslav Kabeláč, 71, Czech composer and conductor.
- Peter Lagger, 53, Swiss opera singer.
- Paul Maze, 92, French-English painter.
- Alexander C. Monteith, 77, American businessman and electrical engineer.
- M. R. Radha, 72, Indian actor and politician, jaundice.
- Rose Skinner, 78, Australian art dealer.
- Utuy Tatang Sontani, 59, Indonesian playwright.
- Y. T. Wu, 85, Chinese theologian.
- Mitsuru Yoshida, 56, Japanese author and naval officer.

=== 18 ===
- Erik Boheman, 84, Swedish diplomat and politician.
- Bryan Cathcart, 82, Canadian politician.
- Sir Evelyn Hone, 67, British Zambian colonial administrator, governor of Northern Rhodesia (1959–1964).
- Gene Kelly, 60, American sportscaster, stroke.
- Isaac Lane, 90, American baseball player.
- William F. Madden, 82, American politician, member of the Massachusetts House of Representatives (1925–1926, 1931–1932) and Senate (1933–1936).
- Joe Mihal, 63, American football player.
- Clark Warburton, 83, American economist.
- André Zeller, 81, French general, co-organizer of the Algiers putsch of 1961.

=== 19 ===
- Lou Busch, 69, American pianist and record producer, traffic collision.
- Sir Arthian Davies, 78, British jurist and lawyer.
- Harry Higgins, 85, English cricketer.
- Preston Jones, 43, American playwright (A Texas Trilogy), complications from surgery.
- Mary Ann Nyberg, 56, American costume designer (A Star Is Born).
- John Simmons, 61, American jazz bassist.
- Monty Wilkinson, 71, English footballer.

=== 20 ===
- Paul Dubov, 60, American actor and screenwriter.
- Enid Foster, 83, American artist.
- Pierre Goldman, 35, French communist activist, shot.
- Ismail Nasiruddin of Terengganu, 72, Malaysian royal, king (1965–1970), heart attack.
- Börje Jeppson, 63, Swedish Olympic equestrian (1952).
- Reginald Jerrold-Nathan, 89–90, English-Australian artist.
- Sir Harold Lydford, 81, English air marshal.
- Nils Segerstråle, 86, Finnish author.
- Ludvík Svoboda, 83, Czechoslovak politician, president (1968–1975), heart attack.

=== 21 ===
- Bernard L. Austin, 76, American naval admiral.
- Floor de Zeeuw, 80, Dutch football player and manager.
- Fred Hanson, 91, Australian footballer.
- Cornelius Homan, 79, British politician, MP (1924–1928).
- Garnet Jex, 83, American artist and historian, stroke.
- Bertha McNeill, 91, American civil rights activist, arteriosclerosis.
- Edmund Morgan, 91, English Anglican prelate.
- Al Preston, 53, American baseball player.
- Ivor Stirling, 63, New Zealand rugby player.
- Ted Tripp, 78, English-born Australian political organizer.
- J. A. B. van Buitenen, 51, Dutch Indologist.
- Jack E. Walker, 69, American politician, member of the Illinois House of Representatives (1957–1965, 1967–1971) and Senate (1971–1975).
- Thomas Wentworth-Fitzwilliam, 10th Earl Fitzwilliam, 75, British hereditary peer.

=== 22 ===
- Karel Cejp, 79, Czech botanist.
- Lawrence Michael De Falco, 64, American Roman Catholic prelate, pancreatic cancer.
- Charles Ehresmann, 74, German-born French mathematician.
- Otto Robert Frisch, 74, Austrian-English physicist.
- Edwin A. Keeble, 74, American architect.
- Abul A'la Maududi, 75, Pakistani Islamic scholar, heart attack.
- Sir Ambrose McGonigal, 61, Northern Irish jurist.
- Richard Nibley, 66, American violinist and composer, amyotrophic lateral sclerosis.
- Ivan Nikolaev, 78, Soviet architect.
- Frederick Piper, 76, English actor.
- Kyllikki Pohjala, 84, Finnish politician, MP (1933–1962).
- Tore Segelcke, 78, Norwegian actress.
- Mary Tarcai, 73, Austrian-born American actress.

=== 23 ===
- Nina Anisimova, 70, Soviet dancer and choreographer.
- Vasif Biçaku, 57, Albanian footballer.
- Arthur Blenkinsop, 68, British politician, MP (1945–1959, 1964–1979).
- Steve Brooks, 57, American jockey, complications from esophagus surgery.
- Fernando Bustos, 35, Mexican footballer, traffic collision.
- Catherine Lacey, 75, English actress.
- Sir Arthur Peters, 91, English naval admiral.
- Dűrrũ Sade, 76–77, Turkish Olympic wrestler (1924).
- Petrus Johannes Waardenburg, 93, Dutch geneticist.

=== 24 ===
- Vasco Bergamaschi, 69, Italian racing cyclist.
- Silvio Dissegna, 12, Italian child and Roman Catholic canonization candidate, bone cancer.
- Elizabeth Simpson Drewry, 86, American politician, member of the West Virginia House of Delegates (1951–1966).
- Charlie Gaudion, 75, Australian footballer.
- Carl Laemmle Jr., 71, American film producer, stroke.
- Herman Lukoff, 56, American computer scientist, leukemia.
- Brigitte Rau, 45, German actress, murdered.
- Wim Tap, 75, Dutch footballer.

=== 25 ===
- John Culhane, 79, Australian footballer.
- Bohumil Kněžek, 78, Czech architect.
- Yury Kovalyov, 45, Soviet footballer.
- Wasyl Kushnir, 86, Ukrainian priest and political activist.
- Jean Martin, 56, Australian sociologist, cancer.
- Tapio Rautavaara, 64, Finnish actor, singer, and Olympic javelin thrower (1948), stroke.
- Karl Schnörrer, 60, German flying ace.
- Ivor Frederick Wentworth Schofield, 75, British colonial administrator.
- Cesare Terranova, 58, Italian politician and jurist, shot.
- Zhou Libo, 71, Chinese novelist.

=== 26 ===
- Charles Carrollo, 77, Italian-born American mobster.
- John Cowan, 50, English photographer, cancer.
- John Cromwell, 92, American film and stage director (The Prisoner of Zenda), pulmonary embolism.
- Philippe Erulin, 47, French soldier, aneurysm.
- Leslie Frise, 84, English aircraft designer.
- Carl Grubert, 68, American cartoonist (The Berrys).
- Charles Skinner Hallpike, 79, English surgeon.
- Arthur Hunnicutt, 69, American actor (The Big Sky, Sugarfoot), cancer.
- Grigory Mylnikov, 60, Soviet military pilot.
- Theodore H. Rowell, 74, American businessman.
- Seymour Shifrin, 53, American composer.
- Alexandra Tolstaya, 95, Russian secretary, daughter of Leo Tolstoy.

=== 27 ===
- Leven Cooper Allen, 85, American general.
- Verne Booth, 80, American Olympic runner (1924).
- Florence Chambers, 71, American Olympic swimmer (1924).
- Dame Gracie Fields, 81, British actress, singer and comedian.
- Arthur Groves, 72, English footballer.
- Henk Krijger, 64, Dutch artist.
- E. F. Joseph, 78, Saint Lucian-born American photojournalist.
- Vladimir Lidin, 85, Soviet author.
- Jimmy McCulloch, 26, Scottish guitarist (Paul McCartney and Wings), morphine overdose.
- Pascal Pia, 76, French journalist and illustrator.
- Bob Swisher, 65, American football player.

=== 28 ===
- Jorge Washington Ábalos, 64, Argentine entomologist.
- John Herbert Chapman, 58, Canadian physicist.
- William Greene, 63, British Olympic field hockey player (1948).
- Catherine Hessling, 79, French actress.
- Maria Kiene, 90, German educator and child welfare activist.
- Angiolo Mazzoni, 85, Italian architect.
- Lothar Wolleh, 49, German photographer, asthma attack.
- Cevat Yurdakul, 37, Turkish lawyer and police officer, shot.

=== 29 ===
- Walter F. Hendricks, 87, American educator.
- Miguel Jarpa Vallejos, 68, Chilean politician.
- Joseph A. Johnson Jr., 65, American theologian.
- Rudy Lavik, 87, American college sports coach.
- Francisco Macías Nguema, 55, Equatoguinean politician, president (1968–1979), execution by firing squad.
- Pierre Marco, 83, French racing driver.
- William J. Reiter, 90, American assistant director.
- Ludwig Rex, 91, German actor.
- Katsuhiko Tasaka, 65, Japanese film director.
- Ivan Wyschnegradsky, 86, Russian-French composer.

=== 30 ===
- George Alain Frecker, 74, Canadian politician.
- Johan Johannesen, 81, Norwegian Olympic track and field athlete (1920).
- Lloyd Leith, 76, American basketball coach.
- Randolph M. Medley, 81, American basketball coach.
- Nell Mercer, 86, American suffragist.
- Charles North, 92, Australian politician.
- Harry Ockerman, 76, American football coach.
- Etsusaburo Shiina, 81, Japanese politician and diplomat.
- Jean Wallbridge, 66, Canadian architect.
- Jaap Weber, 78, Dutch footballer.
