= Carl Auer von Welsbach =

Austrian scientist and inventor (1858–1929)

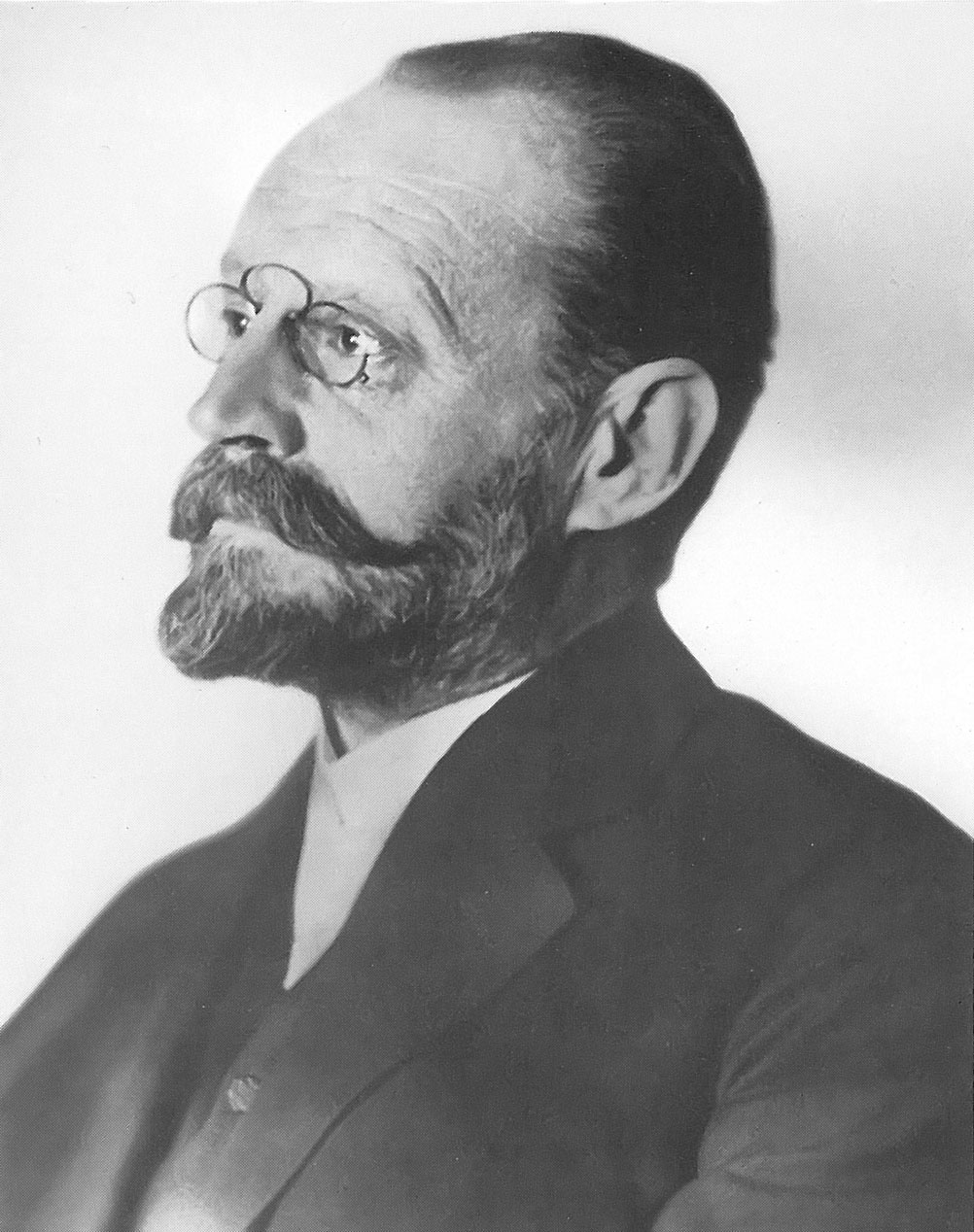
- Born: Carl Auer; 1 September 1858; Vienna, Austrian Empire
- Died: 4 August 1929 (aged 70); Welsbach Castle, Mölbling, Austria
- Other name: Carl Freiherr Auer von Welsbach
- Education: University of Vienna; University of Heidelberg
- Known for: rare-earth elements discovery of praseodymium discovery of neodymium discovery of lutetium lighting improvements
- Spouse: Marie Anna Nimpfer (b. 1869, d. 1950)
- Awards: Elliott Cresson Medal (1900); Wilhelm Exner Medal (1921)
- Scientific career
- Fields: Chemistry
- Doctoral advisor: Robert Bunsen

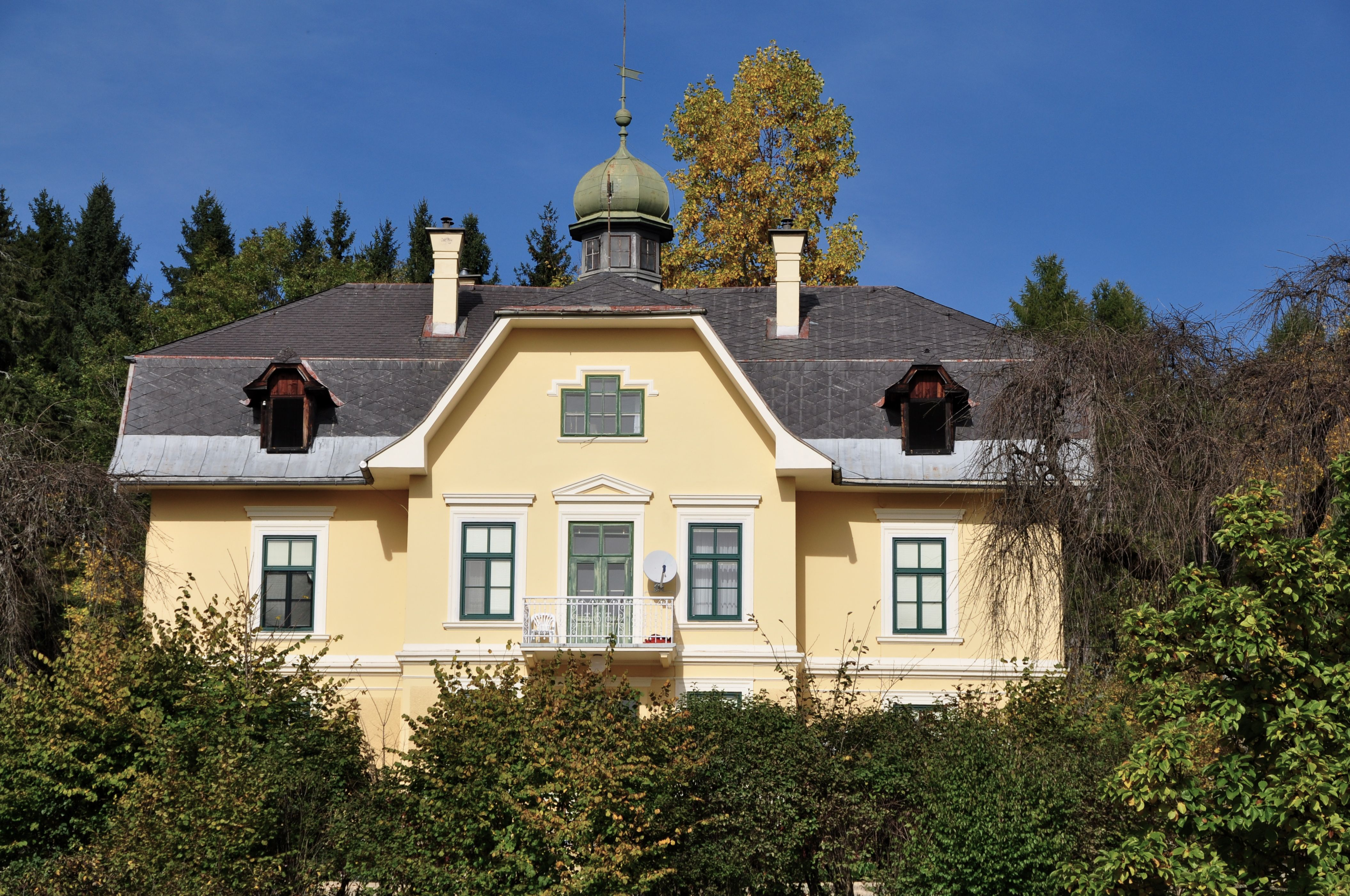
Auer von Welsbach's country house (Schloss Welsbach) in Mölbling, Austria

Carl Auer von Welsbach (1 September 1858 – 4 August 1929), who received the Austrian noble title of Freiherr Auer von Welsbach in 1901, was an Austrian scientist and inventor, who separated didymium into the elements neodymium and praseodymium in 1885. He was also one of three scientists to independently discover the element lutetium (which he named cassiopeium), separating it from ytterbium in 1907, setting off the longest priority dispute in the history of chemistry.

He had a talent not only for making scientific advances, but also for turning them into commercially successful products. His work on rare-earth elements led to the development of the ferrocerium "flints" used in modern lighters, the gas mantle that brought light to the streets of Europe in the late 19th century, and the metal-filament light bulb. He took the phrase plus lucis, meaning "more light", as his motto.

== Early life ==
Carl Auer was born in Vienna on 1 September 1858 to Alois Auer and his wife, Therese Neuditschka. He was the youngest of four children, his elder siblings being Leopoldine, Alois and Amalie. His father, ennobled in 1860 (as Alois Ritter Auer von Welsbach), was director of the Imperial printing office (K.-k. Hof- und Staatsdruckerei) in the days of the Austrian Empire.

Carl went to high schools in Mariahilf and Josefstadt. He attended the Realschule Josefstadt from 1873 to 1877, matriculating on July 16, 1877.

Next, he joined the Austro-Hungarian Army for one year of voluntary military service. He was commissioned as a Second Lieutenant. He joined on October 1, 1877, and received his patent as a lieutenant on December 15, 1878.

In 1878, Auer entered the University of Vienna, studying mathematics, general chemistry, engineering physics, and thermodynamics. He then moved to the University of Heidelberg in 1880, where he continued his studies in spectroscopy under the direction of Robert Bunsen, (inventor of the Bunsen burner). In 1882, he received his Ph.D. degree and returned to Vienna to work as an unpaid assistant in Professor Adolf Lieben's laboratory, working with chemical separation methods for investigations on rare-earth elements.

== Rare earths ==
=== Neodymium and praseodymium ===
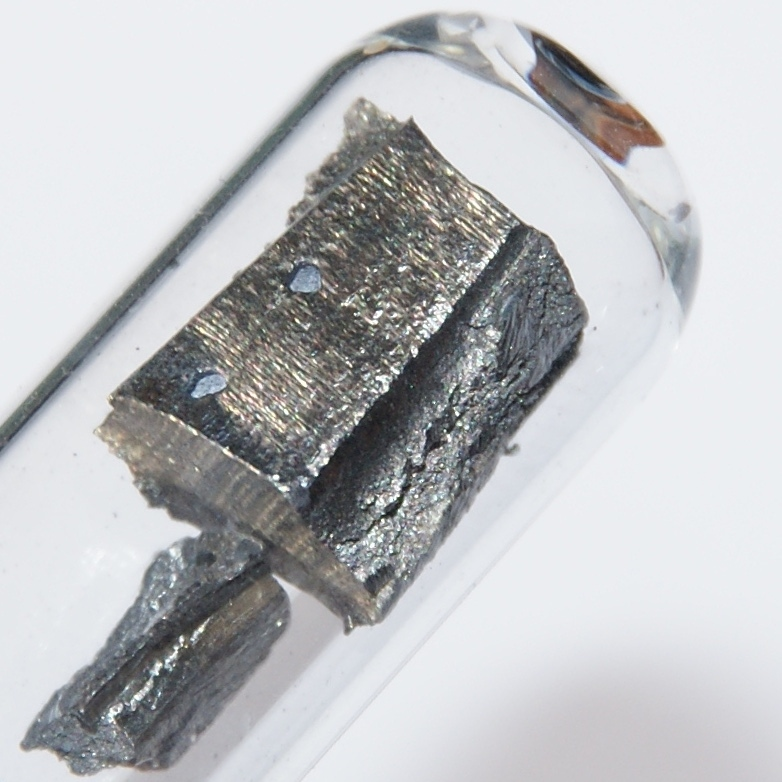
Purified neodymium

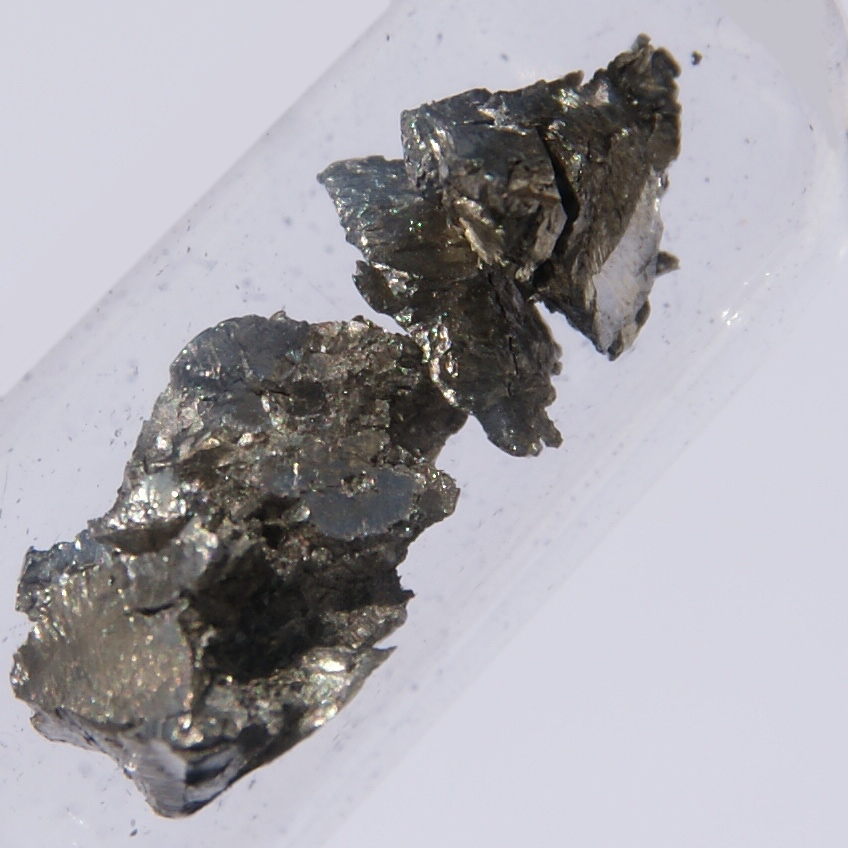
Purified praseodymium

In 1885, Auer von Welsbach used a method of fractional crystallization that he had developed himself to separate the alloy didymium into its two parts, for the first time. It had previously been believed to be an element. After 167 crystallizations, Auer von Welsbach differentiated it into two colored salts: he named the green colored salt "praseodymium" and the pink one "neodidymium". He announced his achievement to the Vienna Academy of Sciences on 18 June 1885. His achievement was approved by Bunsen, but met with considerable skepticism from others.

The name "neodidymium" is derived from the Greek words neos (νέος), new, and didymos (διδύμος), twin. The name praseodymium comes from the Greek prasinos (πράσινος), meaning "green". In naming both elements, and not leaving the original name didymium to the more-abundant component, Auer von Welsbach diverged from established practice, which was to give a new name only to the less-abundant component. Nonetheless, his name for the major fraction, neodidymium, after some modification, became the name of the element neodymium. Praseodymium was also accepted as the name of the minor fraction.

=== Lutetium and ytterbium ===
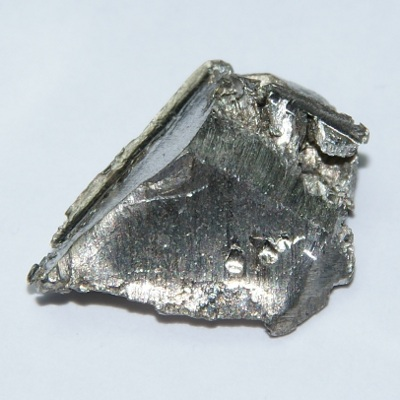
Ytterbium

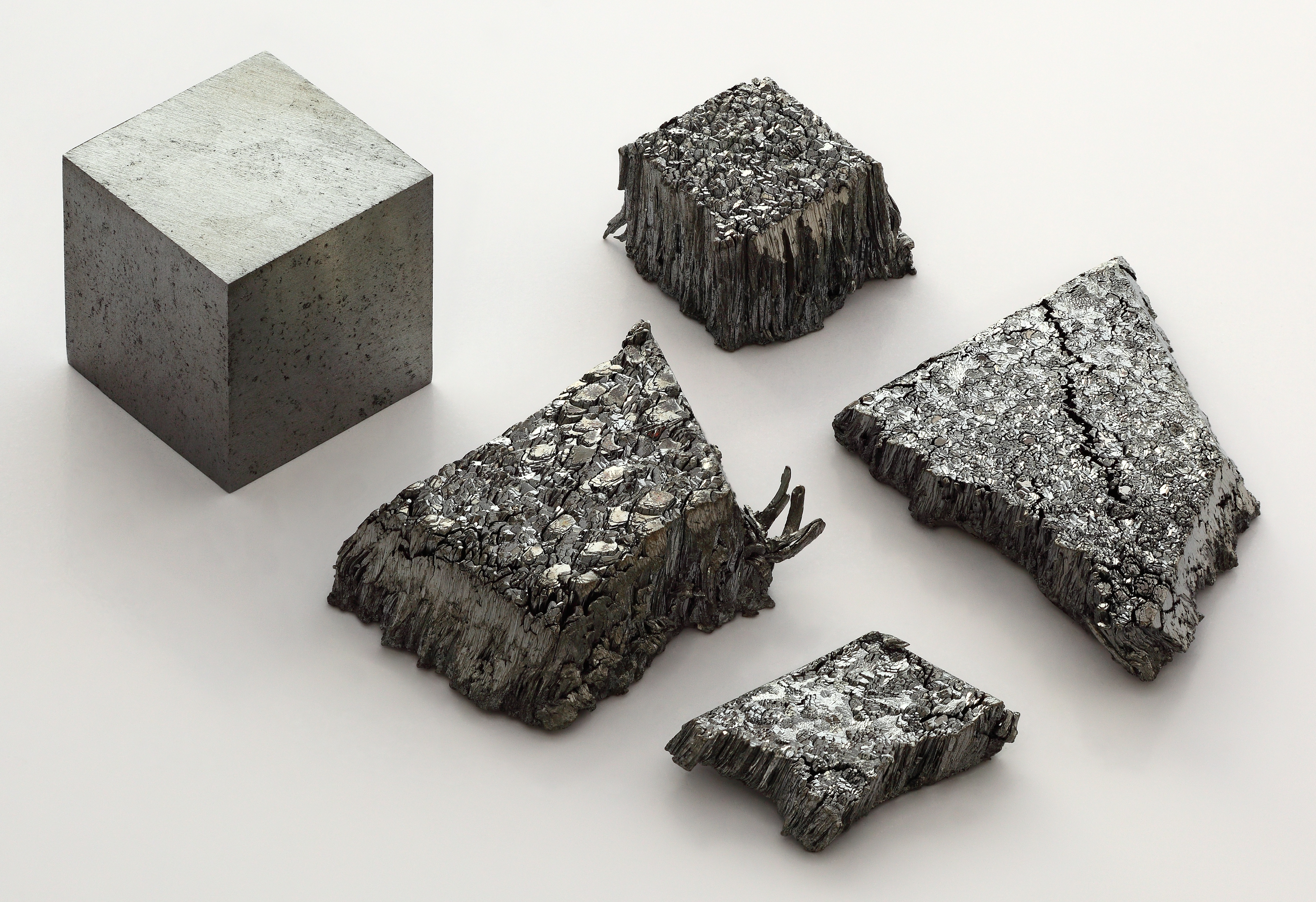
Purified lutetium

The rare earth element lutetium was independently discovered by three scientists at around the same time in 1907: French scientist Georges Urbain, Austrian Auer von Welsbach, and American Charles James. All three were successful in separating the substance then known as ytterbium into two new fractions. To name the newly discovered fraction, Urbain suggested the name "lutecium", for the Roman city of Lutetia that preceded Paris. Auer von Welsbach suggested the name "cassiopeium". James' work was not yet published when the others' work appeared, and he did not involve himself in subsequent disputes. Lutetium, a slight modification of Urbain's name, was eventually accepted after a long battle between Urbain and Welsbach.

== Lighting innovations ==
=== Gas mantle ===
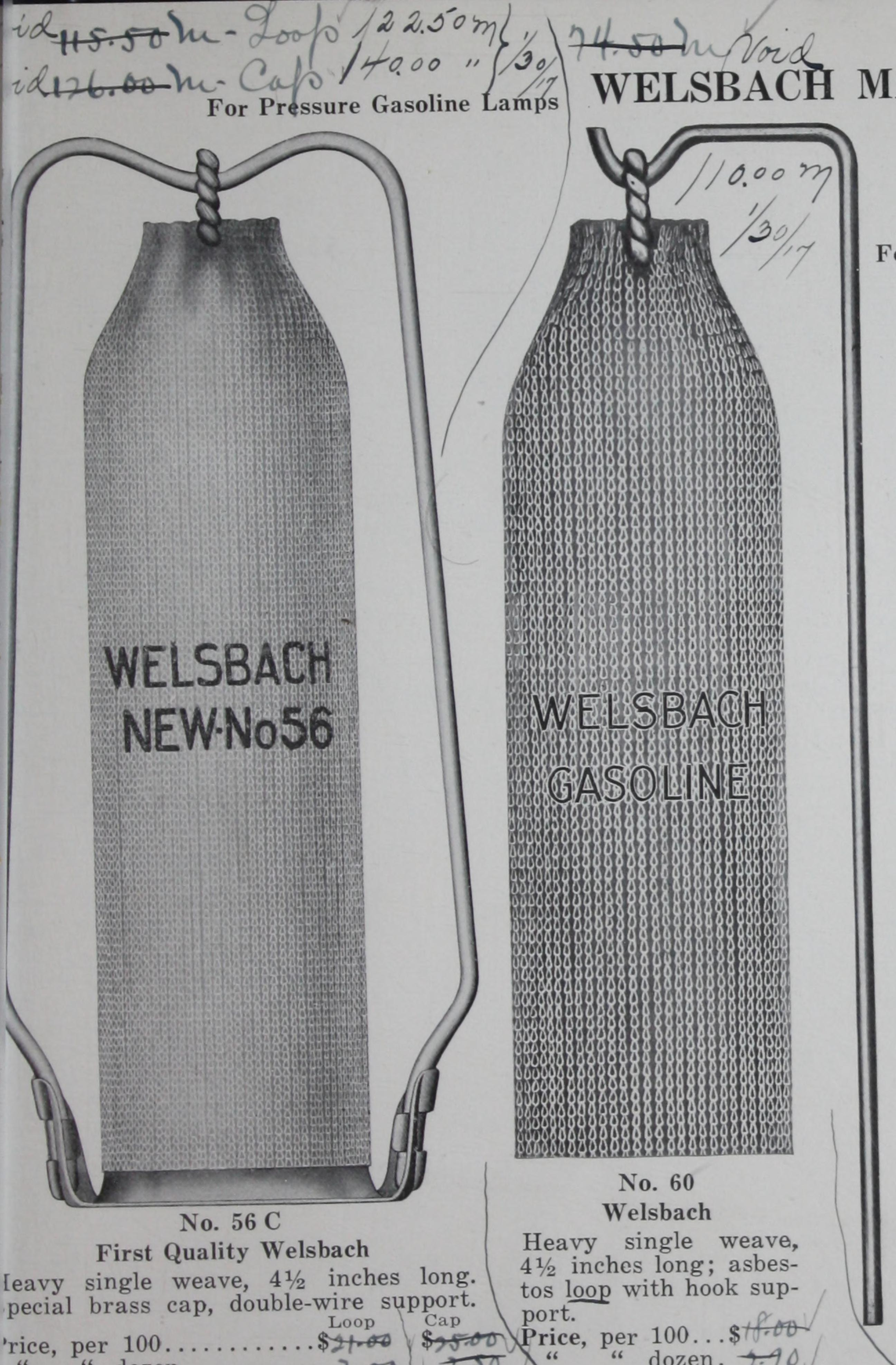
Welsbach Mantle advertisement, 1910

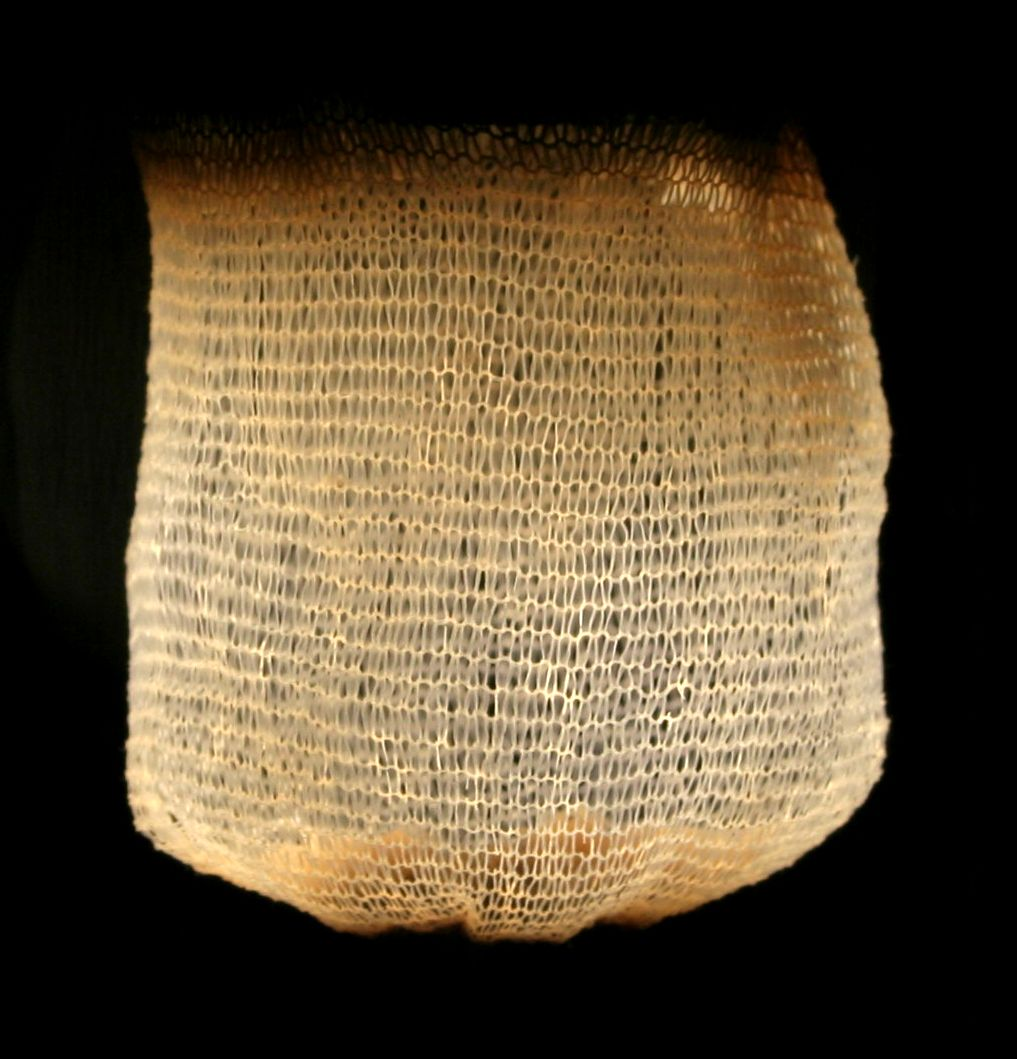
A gas mantle burning at full brightness

On 23 September 1885, Auer von Welsbach received a patent on his development of the gas mantle, which he called Auerlicht, using a chemical mixture of 60% magnesium oxide, 20% lanthanum oxide and 20% yttrium oxide, which he called Actinophor. To produce a mantle, guncotton is impregnated with a mixture of Actinophor and then heated, the cotton eventually burns away, leaving a solid (albeit fragile) ash, which glows brightly when heated. These original mantles gave off a green-tinted light and were not very successful, and his first company formed to sell them failed in 1889.

In 1890 he introduced a new form of the mantle based on a mixture of 99% thorium dioxide and 1% cerium(IV) oxide, which he developed in collaboration with his colleague Ludwig Haitinger. These proved both more robust and having a much "whiter" light. Another company founded to produce the newer design was formed in 1891, working with fellow student from the university Ignaz Kreidl, and the device quickly spread throughout Europe.

In the United States this technique was adopted by The Coleman Company and became their logo for the company. In the 1980s it was reported that Thorium's radio-daughters (Decay products) could be volatilized and released into the air upon incandescence of the mantle. A lawsuit (Wagner v. Coleman) was brought against Coleman. The company changed its formulation to use non-radioactive materials, which apparently cost less and last longer.

=== Metal-filament light bulb ===
Auer von Welsbach then started work on development of metal-filament mantles, first with platinum wiring, and then osmium. Osmium is very difficult to work with, but he developed a new method, which mixed osmium oxide powder with rubber or sugar into a paste, which is then squeezed through a nozzle and fired. The paste burns away, leaving a fine wire of osmium.

Although originally intended to be a new mantle, it was during this period that electricity was being introduced into the market, and he started experimenting with ways to use the filaments as a replacement for the electric arc light. He worked on this until finally developing a workable technique in 1898 and started a new factory to produce his Auer-Oslight, which he introduced commercially in 1902. The metal-filament light bulb was a huge improvement on the existing carbon-filament designs, lasting much longer, using about half the electricity for the same amount of light, and being much more robust.

=== Lighting flint ===
In 1903 Auer von Welsbach won another patent for a fire striker ("flint") composition named ferrocerium. It takes its name from its two primary components: iron (from Latin: ferrum), and the rare-earth element cerium. It is also known in Europe as "Auermetall" after its inventor. Three different Auermetalls were developed: the first was iron and cerium, the second also included lanthanum to produce brighter sparks, and the third added other heavy metals. In Auer von Welsbach's first alloy, 30% iron (ferrum) was added to purified cerium, hence the name "ferro-cerium".

Welsbach's flints consisted of pyrophoric alloys, 70% cerium and 30% iron, which when scratched or struck would give off sparks. This system remains in wide use in cigarette lighters today. In 1907 he formed Treibacher Chemische Werke GesmbH to build and market the devices.

== Radium research ==
For the rest of his life Auer von Welsbach turned again to "pure" chemistry. He worked largely on his estate at Welsbach Castle (Schloß Welsbach) near Treibach near Althofen. In addition to his work on elements and minerals, he made advances in the development of photographic techniques. He was also a devoted gardener, carefully supporting rare and difficult-to-grow plants in his garden, and breeding new varieties of roses and apple trees.

He published a number of papers on chemical separation and spectroscopy, working on radioactive elements as early as 1904. In 1910, one of his companies helped to establish Vienna as a center of radiation research by producing the first major quantity of radium chloride (3-4 grams) in Europe.

In 1910, Auer von Welsbach reported a "mysterious observation", the induction of radioactivity in an inactive substance when exposed to a radioactive substance. Based on his report, it is possible that he may have been the first to observe neutron activation.

Between 1907 and 1918, Auer von Welsbach focused on isolating preparations of actinium and thorium as by-products of radium extraction. He kept up an active correspondence with physicist Stefan Meyer, managing director of the Institute for Radium Research, Vienna, to discuss the extraction of actinium. Meyer and his staff do not appear to have had the chemical knowledge to understand Auer von Welsbach's methods, and Auer von Welsbach resigned around 1917.

During World War I, he had difficulty finding staff to carry out research. After the war, he was active in supporting the work of the institute, and other scientists. He presented a major paper on his spectroscopic work and the separation of radioactive elements in 1922. The following photographs show scientific equipment from Auer von Welsbach's laboratory, from "Spektroskopische Methoden der analytischen Chemie" (1922).

Figure I, Early version of spark apparatus

Figure II, Later version of spark apparatus

Figure III

Figure IV, Spectral comparison panel in very reduced scale

Figure V, Comparative apparatus for spectra

== Commemoration ==
Fascination Light 2008 Euro commemorative coin, niobium and silver.

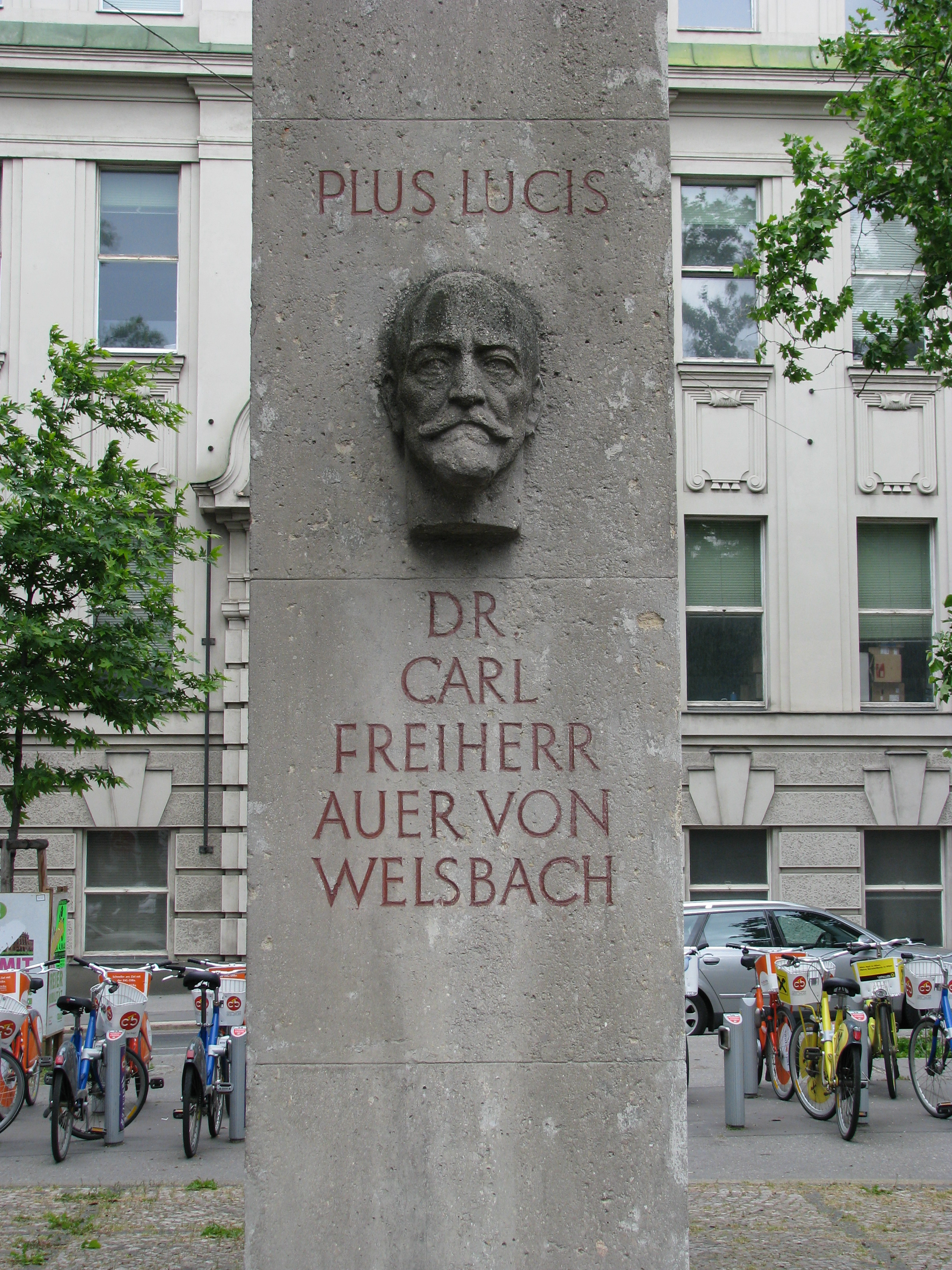
Monument in Vienna

In 2008 (150 years after his birth), Auer von Welsbach was selected as a main motif for a high-value collectors' coin: the Austrian €25 Fascination Light. The reverse has a partial portrait of Auer on the left-hand side. The sun shines in the middle of the green niobium pill, while several methods of illumination from the gas light from incandescent light bulbs and neon lamps to modern light-emitting diodes spread out around the silver ring.

He was also depicted on postage stamps of 1936, 1954 and 2012.

== Awards and honors ==
- 1900, Elliott Cresson Medal, The Franklin Institute Awards, Philadelphia, PA, USA
- 1901, raised to the hereditary nobility by Franz Joseph I of Austria, with the title of Freiherr Auer von Welsbach
- 1920, Werner von Siemens Ring
- 1921, Wilhelm Exner Medal, inaugural awardee, Austrian Industry Association, Austria
- 1988, the Welsbach Museum at Althofen was opened in April, 1998
- 2011, National Inventors Hall of Fame, North Canton, Ohio, USA

== See also ==
- Auergesellschaft
- Auerlite
