= Monty Wilkinson =

Monty Wilkinson may refer to:

- Monty Wilkinson (lawyer), American lawyer
- Monty Wilkinson (footballer) (1908–1979), English professional footballer
