= Ignaz Kreidl =

Austrian chemist

- Born: December 11, 1869; Gratzen, Austria-Hungary
- Died: May 21, 1947 (aged 77); New York City, New York, U.S.
- Education: University of Vienna
- Known for: Rare earths, Glass, Enamels

Ignaz Kreidl (December 11, 1869 – May 21, 1947) was a chemist and industrialist living in Vienna, Austria.

He held numerous patents related to the production and use of rare earths and the production of glass, enamels, and synthetic resins.

In addition to founding the chemical company Vereinigte Chemischen Fabriken (VCF), he became a major shareholder in J. Schreiber & Neffen, a leading glass manufacturer.

In the 1930s Kreidl became a target of the National Socialists. During the Anschluss his wife Eva died, and his possessions were confiscated. Kreidl and his three sons were able to leave Austria and emigrate to the United States. After the end of World War II they were able to reclaim some of his business assets.

== Early life ==
Ignaz Kreidl was born on December 11, 1869, in Gratzen, Austria-Hungary (now Nové Hrady in the Czech Republic).

== Education ==
Kreidl became a student at the University of Vienna, and worked as an assistant to Adolf Lieben. He obtained his degree in 1892.

In 1891, while still a student, Kreidl began working with Carl Auer von Welsbach to produce a newer design for the gas mantle which was used for street lights. They formed a company which specialized in the use of rare earths in glassmaking. Rare earths such as cerium, neodymium and praseodymium are used for polishing glass, for the creation of specific colors and visual effects, and for optical properties which they can impart to glass.

Kreidl rose from the position of research chemist to research manager and co-manager of production at the Welsbach company. By 1906, Kreidl was unhappy in the position and sought new opportunities.

== Life in Vienna ==
=== A family in business ===
The Kreidl and Heller families were closely connected. Ignaz' sister Mathilde (1868–1926) was married to industrialist Gustav Heller (1857–1937). In 1908, Ignaz Kreidl and Gustav Heller formed the Kreidl and Heller company. On October 1, 1910, "Dr. Kreidl und Heller" (shareholders: Gustav Heller and Ignaz Kreidl) merged with another producer of chemical products, "Landau & Co" (shareholders: Horace Landau and Karl Rosenzweig) to form "Vereinigte Chemischen Fabriken, Kreidl, Heller & Co." (VCF). As of 1912, the company's address was XXI Sebastian-Kohlgasse 5-9, Vienna, Austria, then part of Austria-Hungary.

VCF was involved in the production of rare earths, which were used to create glass, enamels, and synthetic resins. Kreidl led a strong research program that resulted in the registration of a number of patents relating to the production of resins, glass, and enamels. These included processes such as the manufacturing of opaquing agents for white enamel, which could be used in dentistry.

The company was also active in other areas. It made agricultural products such as sulfur-based weed sprays to combat pests in orchards, vineyards and gardens. It produced salts for pickling and canning.

It also produced saccharin, under the brand name "Kandisin".

Among Kreidl's many patents are a number relating to the use of saccharin by diabetics. The company even published a cookbook of saccharine recipes, Mein 'süßes' Kochbuch. Die Verwendung von Süßstoff, Tabletten-, und Kristallsüßstoff und Kandiset für Speisen und Getränke jeder Art (My "sweet" cookbook. The use of sweetener, tablet, and crystal sweetener and candy for food and drinks of any kind).

Ignaz Kreidl was a highly respected scientist and industrialist. He held over two hundred patents, in multiple countries, in the areas of glass, resins, plastics, photochemical processing, enamel ware and porcelain enamels. He funded scholarships at the Institute for Radium Research, Vienna, supporting students such as Elizabeth Rona.

=== A family of scientists ===
Ignaz Kreidl had three sons by his first wife, Hilda (d. 1921): Norbert J. Kreidl (1904–1994), Werner H. Kreidl (1906–1989), and Ekkehard L. Kreidl (1910–1977). Werner studied chemistry; Norbert majored in physics with a minor in chemistry; and Ekkehard became a physicist. Werner worked with Ignaz at the Vereinigten Chemischen Fabriken, Kreidl, Heller & Co., in Vienna, and was trained to become his successor.

Norbert J. Kreidl entered the University of Vienna as a chemistry student, but soon joined physicist Otto Pettersson at the Institute for Radium Research, Vienna.

Norbert Kreidl completed his doctorate in physics with a minor in chemistry, receiving degrees in 1925 and 1927. He then spent a post-doctoral year at the Kaiser Wilhelm Institute in Berlin with Woldemar Weyl.

Ignaz Kreidl had acquired a major interest in one of the most prestigious Czechoslovak glass manufacturers in Europe, J. Schreiber & Neffen. Schreiber's had factories in Rapotín, Moravia and in Lednické Rovne, Slovakia. Its central office was in Vienna until 1919. After World War I ended, and the Austro-Hungarian Empire dissolved, the head office was moved to Rapotín to satisfy the government of Czechoslovakia. The company employed over 1,100 skilled workers, many from traditional glassmaking families. Norbert Kreidl was sent to manage the Schreiber Glassworks and started a research laboratory, the Glass Research Institute, in Hradec Králové, Czechoslovakia. There he met and married a granddaughter of the glassworks' founding family, Melanie Schreiber.

== Austria and National Socialism ==
=== Between the wars ===
The inter-war period was a time of considerable economic instability. Creditanstalt-Weiner Bankverein (CA), the major bank in Austria, managed to survive World War I, the breakup of the Austro-Hungarian Empire, a world-wide financial crisis during the Great Depression, and two rounds of government-related reorganization in 1931 and 1933. In 1913 CA was effectively a multi-national, with interests in 102 companies that included banking, insurance, natural resources, manufacturing, and industry. By 1934, it had become "Austrified". It was primarily owned by the Austrian state, to service the Austrian economy and business interests. There had been significant turnover among its leadership. The Chancellor of Austria, among others, made Jews a convenient scapegoat for the economic crash, and institutions were being "Aryanized" by firing Jewish personnel.

=== The Anschluss ===
Conditions in Austria worsened significantly after the Anschluss on March 12, 1938, when Austria was annexed by Nazi Germany. As a result of the Anschluss, CA again faced shifting political boundaries and their social, economic, and industrial impacts. Social and legal pressures for Aryanization increased. Being declared Jewish meant that your possessions could be confiscated and you could be arrested.

For companies, being classed as German rather than Austrian meant that companies faced potential losses in international markets due to anti-German boycotts. At the same time, as Germany took over other countries, companies had the potential to expand within Germany's enlarged political boundaries. As the Nazis took over Austrian banking and government, there was intense internal rivalry between Nazi factions and informal groups who sought to control the distribution of assets that were being confiscated from Viennese Jews.

=== Impact on the Kreidls ===
Kreidl and his family belonged to a complex network of people connected by personal as well scientific and business ties. Like many others in Austria and Germany, the Kreidls were of Jewish descent, but were largely assimilated: they were not observant. Ignaz Kreidl himself was far from the racist stereotypes promoted by the National Socialists: he had blue eyes, fair hair and a commanding presence. Regardless, he and his family were considered by the Nazis to be Jewish.

The Kreidls were targeted almost immediately. On the evening of March 18, 1938, less than a week after Austria was annexed, the records of the Federal Police Directorate of Vienna show that Ignaz Kreidl's home was searched by police officers. Ignaz Kreidl, his second wife Eva, his sister-in-law Dr. Marianne Kreidl and Dr. Hilde Mathé were all present. Police officers took items including money, jewelry, and business letters. Ignaz Kreidl was arrested and imprisoned without charge for two days. He was released on Sunday, March 20, 1938, to learn that his wife Eva had fallen from the fourth floor of their building and was dead.

=== Aryanization of J. Schreiber & Neffen ===
Ignaz Kreidl was a major stockholder in J. Schreiber & Neffen, one of the leading glass manufacturers in Austria-Hungary. Kreidl owned 8,512 shares in Schreiber, almost half of the company's total of 20,000 shares. An additional 4,430 shares belonged to Frederike Selahettin, who was also considered Jewish by the National Socialists. The remainder were still held by the Schreiber family, who had been considered Aryan.

Effective June 15, 1938, the Schreiber company was "Aryanized". The possessions of Kreidl and Selahettin were confiscated by the Gestapo and declared to be the property of "the Land of Austria". Selling the shares "at the best possible price" proved particularly difficult because some of the company's assets were outside German jurisdiction: There were Schreiber factories in Czechoslovakia, which were not at the time under German control.

One of Creditanstalt-Weiner Bankverein's holdings was a glass company, Stölzle Glasindustrie AG. CA and Stölzle were both interested parties in the acquisition of Schreiber, but their interests did not always align with those of authorities in Liberec and Opava. In spite of concerns that the Schreiber factories would be unable to pay their bills and would lose their skilled workforce, negotiations took more than a year. Special arrangements had to be made to deal with assets that were now in different countries. Finally, the sale of the Schreiber shares to Stölzle was approved.

=== Aryanization of Vereinigte Chemische Fabriken Kreidl, Heller & Co. ===
Vereinigte Chemische Fabriken Kreidl, Heller & Co. (VCF) was also Aryanized. At the time, Ignaz Kreidl owned 75% of the shares of the company he had founded. The remainder was held by Karl Theodor Rutter, whose wife Margarete Grethe Rutter was the daughter of Gustav Heller and Mathilde (Kreidl) Heller. Margarete Rutter was therefore both the daughter of Ignaz Kreidl's original partner in the firm, and Kreidl's niece. Karl Rutter was arrested in May 1938 as part of the Aryanization process and detained for three months.

VCF's appropriation by the Nazis has been described as "a prime example of systemic corruption in National Socialism" ("Ein Paradebeispiel für die systemimmanente Korruption im Nationalsozialismus"). Acting superintendent SS-Sturmbannführer Fridolin Glass was the person in charge of selling the company after its appropriation. Glass himself had neither financial assets nor business experience. He was, however, in a position to arrange for the arrest of Karl Rutter in May 1938, and the forcible removal of money, securities and documents from the VCF factory. Through a series of dubious assessments he ensured that the company was vastly undervalued. After a series of highly questionable actions involving multiple parties, the renamed "Vereinigte Chemische Fabriken Wien-Floridsdorf" became the property of Fridolin Glass.

Fridolin Glass was sent to Russia where he was killed in action on February 21, 1943. His will of February 4, 1943, left his assets to other Viennese SS members with substantial bequests to his wife Ilse Glass and his parents.

== Emigration to America ==
Between 1937 and 1940, Ignaz, his three sons, and various other family members were able to leave Austria and emigrate to the United States. Ekkehard left in 1937, eventually settling in Wayland, Massachusetts. Norbert and Melanie used the opportunity of attending a meeting in New York to escape in 1938. Werner was able to leave Austria in 1939. Ignaz travelled to Great Britain in 1938, and then to the United States in 1939, where he became an American citizen.

All four men are included in the membership roster of the American Ceramic Society for 1945. Ignaz and Werner are listed at 155 Waverly Place, New York; Norbert at 475 Gardham Rd., Rochester, NY; and M. Sgt. E. L. Kreidl at Ft. Belvoir, Virginia. After moving to the United States, Ignaz and Werner established the Kreidl Chemico-Physical Corporation, New York, N. Y. Ekkehard L. Kreidl became a research physicist for the Radiation Branch of the Engineering Board of the United States Army, and later worked on air quality control for Arthur D. Little, Inc. of Cambridge, Mass. and Kaiser Steel.

Norbert Kreidl became an internationally respected glass scientist. Initially he joined his former professor, Woldemar Weyl, at Pennsylvania State College. He later became head of materials and development at Bausch and Lomb Optical Company and taught at the University of Missouri-Rolla. In addition he was a consultant to NASA, president of the International Commission on Glass, and active in organizing a series of international glass conferences. Following the second world war, Norbert established a fund to support students of his former teacher, Adolf Smekal, in Graz. He named it the Ignaz Kreidl Fund.

Ignaz' sister-in-law, Marianne Kreidl (née von Bronneck), one of the earliest women chemists to attend Vienna University, also emigrated to the United States and found work in 1938. Her husband, Ignaz' brother Alexandre, had died December 29, 1937. Candy-maker John Heller (originally "Hans"), a son of Gustav Heller and Mathilde Kreidl, emigrated from Vienna to New York in 1940. There he founded Heller Candy Inc.

== Reparations ==
Following the war, Ignaz Kreidl was able to regain some company assets, in particular some of those stolen by Fridolin Glass, by appealing to the Property Control Branch of the U.S. Allied Commission for Austria (USACA), 1945-1950. Following Ignaz' death in 1947, his son Werner took on responsibility for the European holdings.

The original company site had been significantly damaged by bombers near the end of World War II. Kreidl was able to obtain funds to rebuild because of the Marshall Plan. The company "Vereinigte Chemische Fabriken Kreidl, Rutter & Co." was formed in 1949, and gradually resumed production. By 1961, with 400 employees, the company was able to supply 80-90% of Austria's market for plastics, resins, and other products it produced.
