= Sara Mustonen =

Sara Mustonen may refer to:

- Sara Mustonen (cyclist) (born 1981), Swedish racing cyclist
- Sara Mustonen (skier) (1962–1979), Finnish alpine skier
