= Ivan Palmaw =

Russian-American architect (1896–1979)

- Palmaw, 1931
- Born: November 19, 1896; Saint Petersburg, Russian Empire
- Died: September 14, 1979 (aged 82); Mercer Island, Washington, United States
- Occupation: Architect
- Years active: 1920–1969

Ivan Michael Palmaw (November 19 [O.S. November 6], 1896 – September 14, 1979) was a Russian-American architect and White émigré. Born in Saint Petersburg, he studied as a military engineer and served in the Imperial Russian Army during the First World War. Palmaw fled the country after the Russian Revolution, eventually travelling to Shanghai to stay with his uncle, architect Alexander Sergeevich Khrenov. He worked with Khrenov in Shanghai for a period, designing a number of residences. Palmaw immigrated to the United States in 1926, where he settled in Seattle and enrolled in the University of Washington. He graduated in 1929, and began work at the firm of Roy D. Rogers the following year. Alongside two other architects, he formed the partnership Baker, Stewart and Palmaw in 1934, but continued to work on independent contracts, including the Saint Spiridon Orthodox Cathedral in 1936–1938. He designed a number of electrical substations for Seattle City Light during the 1940s and early 1950s. In 1957, he began work at the firm of Harry Powell on Mercer Island, and retired in 1969.

== Biography ==
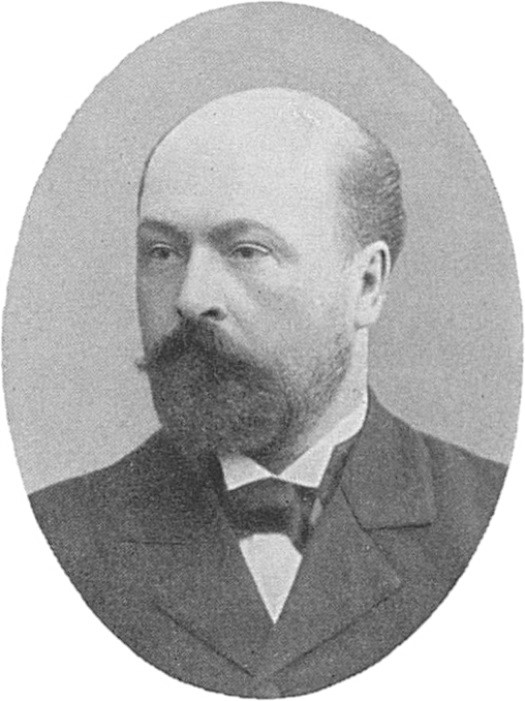
Alexander Sergeevich Khrenov, Palmaw's uncle and architectural mentor

Ivan Michael Palmaw was born in Saint Petersburg on November 19 [O.S. November 6], 1896. He studied military engineering at the Saint Petersburg Imperial University. He then served in the Imperial Russian Army as an officer during the First World War, but joined the White émigrés and fled the country following the Russian Revolution. In 1920, he travelled to Shanghai to stay with his uncle, the architect Alexander Sergeevich Khrenov. He worked at Khrenov's architecture office in Shanghai, helping to design and construct a number of houses and apartments.

In 1926, Palmaw immigrated to the United States, and enrolled in the University of Washington in Seattle. He graduated with a Bachelor of Architecture in 1929, and became an American citizen the following year. He began work at the firm of Seattle architect Roy D. Rogers in 1930, where he had designed three houses in Seattle. Palmaw applied for an architecture license in 1931, stating that he had worked on a palace, two hotels, a club house, an office building, a barracks, a transformer station, six apartment buildings and twenty-six private residences. He additionally noted that he had fully designed one of the apartments and seventeen of the residences, including their electrical and plumbing infrastructure.

Palmaw briefly entered independent practice before joining with architects Frank Lidstone Baker and George Stewart in 1934 to form the firm Baker, Stewart and Palmaw. While with Stewart and Baker, Palmaw joined their ongoing program of designing worker housing at Ross Dam, for Seattle City Light's Skagit River Hydroelectric Project. Stewart designed one of the project's lodges by himself, while Palmaw assisted him for another, House No. 6.

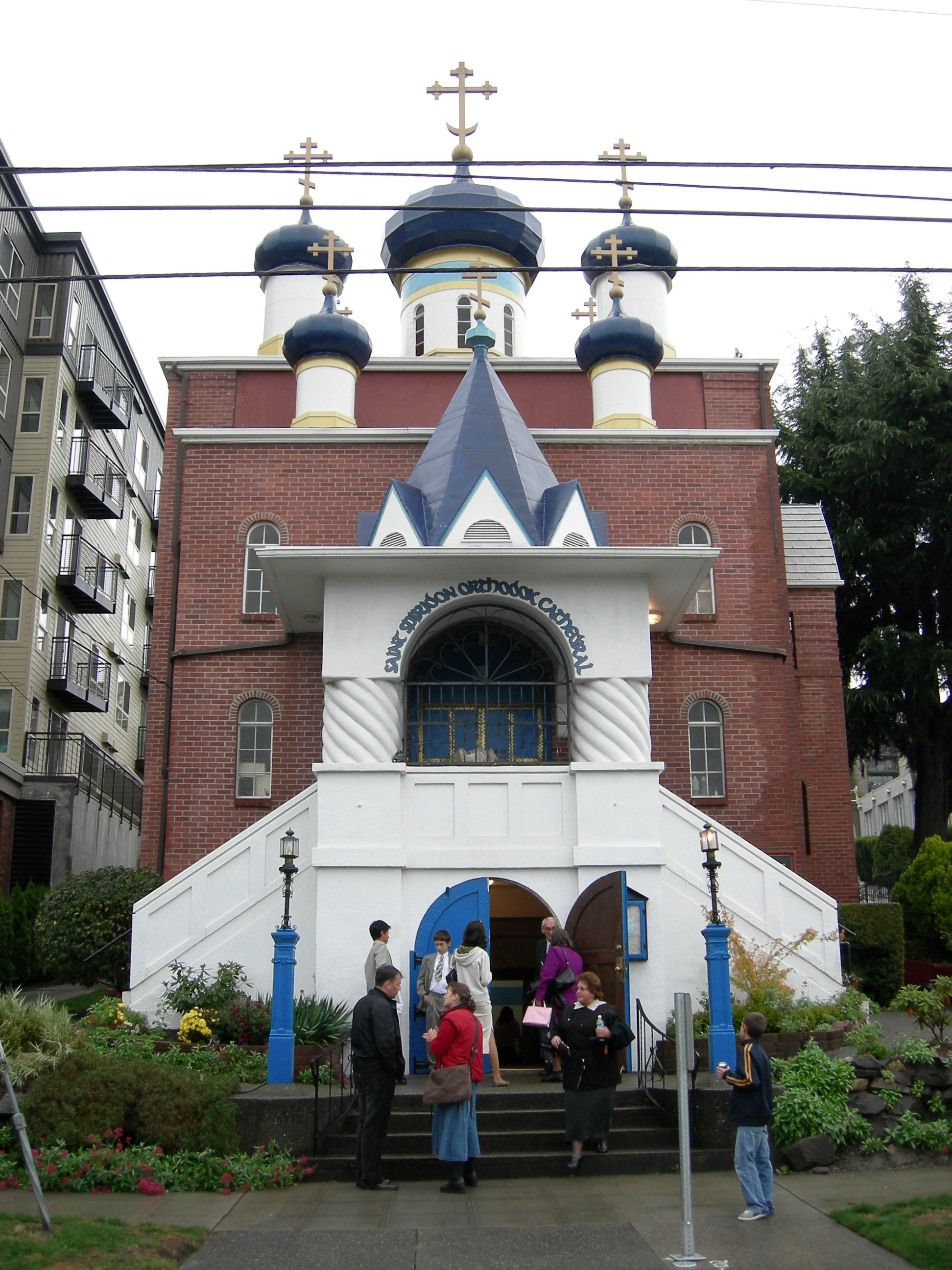
Palmaw designed the Saint Spiridon Orthodox Cathedral in Seattle

The partnership dissolved in 1939, and Palmaw continued work on his independent commissions. In addition to private residences, such as the first homes of the Blue Ridge neighborhood, he designed two Russian Orthodox churches in a Byzantine style; the Saint Nicholas Russian Orthodox Cathedral (1932–1937) and the Saint Spiridon Orthodox Cathedral (1936–1938), both in Seattle. From 1939 to 1942, he designed the Renton Fire Hall, a Streamline Moderne structure now hosting the Renton History Museum. Palmaw returned to work with Seattle City Light in the 1940s, designing many of its substations, including the Columbia and Magnolia Substations in 1941, the First Hill Substation in 1947, and the Bothell and Broad Street Substations in 1949–1951. His Broad Street Substation was declared a city landmark in 2019.

In 1957, Palmaw moved to Mercer Island, Washington, to work for the architecture firm Harry Powell & Associates, working there until his retirement in 1969. He died on Mercer Island on September 14, 1979.

== Works ==
Designs by Ivan Palmaw
Name	Location	Date	Ref.
Thomas Balmer House	Seattle	1930	
Horner House	Seattle	1931	
Frank Burnett House	Seattle	1931	
Saint Nicholas Russian Orthodox Cathedral	Seattle	1932–1937	
L. I. Ozerkov Residence	Seattle	1936	
Saint Spiridon Orthodox Cathedral	Seattle	1936–1938	
Willard E. Williams Residence	Seattle	1939–1940	
Renton Fire Hall	Renton	1939–1942	
Seattle City Light Columbia Substation	Seattle	1941	
Seattle City Light Magnolia Substation	Seattle	1941	
Seattle Furniture Upholstery Building	Seattle	1946	
Seattle City Light First Hill Substation	Seattle	1947	
George Cardas Residence	Seattle	1947	
Seattle City Light Bothell Substation	Bothell	1949	
Seattle City Light Broad Street Station	Seattle	1949–1951	
