= Auerlite =

Phosphorus bearing variety of thorite

Auerlite is a rare North Carolina mineral variety, remarkably rich in thorium dioxide (also known as thoria), named after Carl Auer von Welsbach, the inventor of the Welsbach incandescent gas mantle. It is considered to be a phosphorus bearing variety of thorite.

== Description ==
It was originally described as a hydrous silico-phosphate of thorium, ThO_{2}(SiO_{2},1/3P_{2}O_{5})+2H_{2}O, i.e. thorite in which part of the silica is replaced by phosphoric acid. The crystals are tetragonal, lemon-yellow to brown-red in color, and sub-translucent to opaque. The mineral is very brittle; its hardness is 2.5 to 3, and its specific gravity 4.422 to 4.766, the darker crystals having the greatest density.

Analysis gave the following results: —

H_{2}O	CO_{2}	SiO_{2}	P_{2}O_{5}	ThO_{2}	Fe_{2}O_{3}	CaO	MgO	Al_{2}O_{3}	Total
10.21	1.00	7.64	7.46	70.13	1.38	0.49	0.29	1.10	99.70

== Locations ==
This mineral has hitherto been found at only two places in Henderson County, North Carolina, namely, at the Freeman mine, and on the Price land, 3 miles (4.8 km) to the southwest. At both places it occurs in disintegrated granitic or gneissic rock, intimately associated with zircon crystals, on which it is often seen implanted.

== Etymology ==
As this mineral was found while mining the zircons necessary to supply the demand caused by the invention of the system of incandescent gas lighting by Carl Auer von Welsbach, the authors of the original description proposed to name it Auerlite in his honour.
