= Saint Spiridon Orthodox Cathedral =

Cathedral in Seattle, Washington, U.S.

Coordinates: 47°37′20″N 122°19′49″W

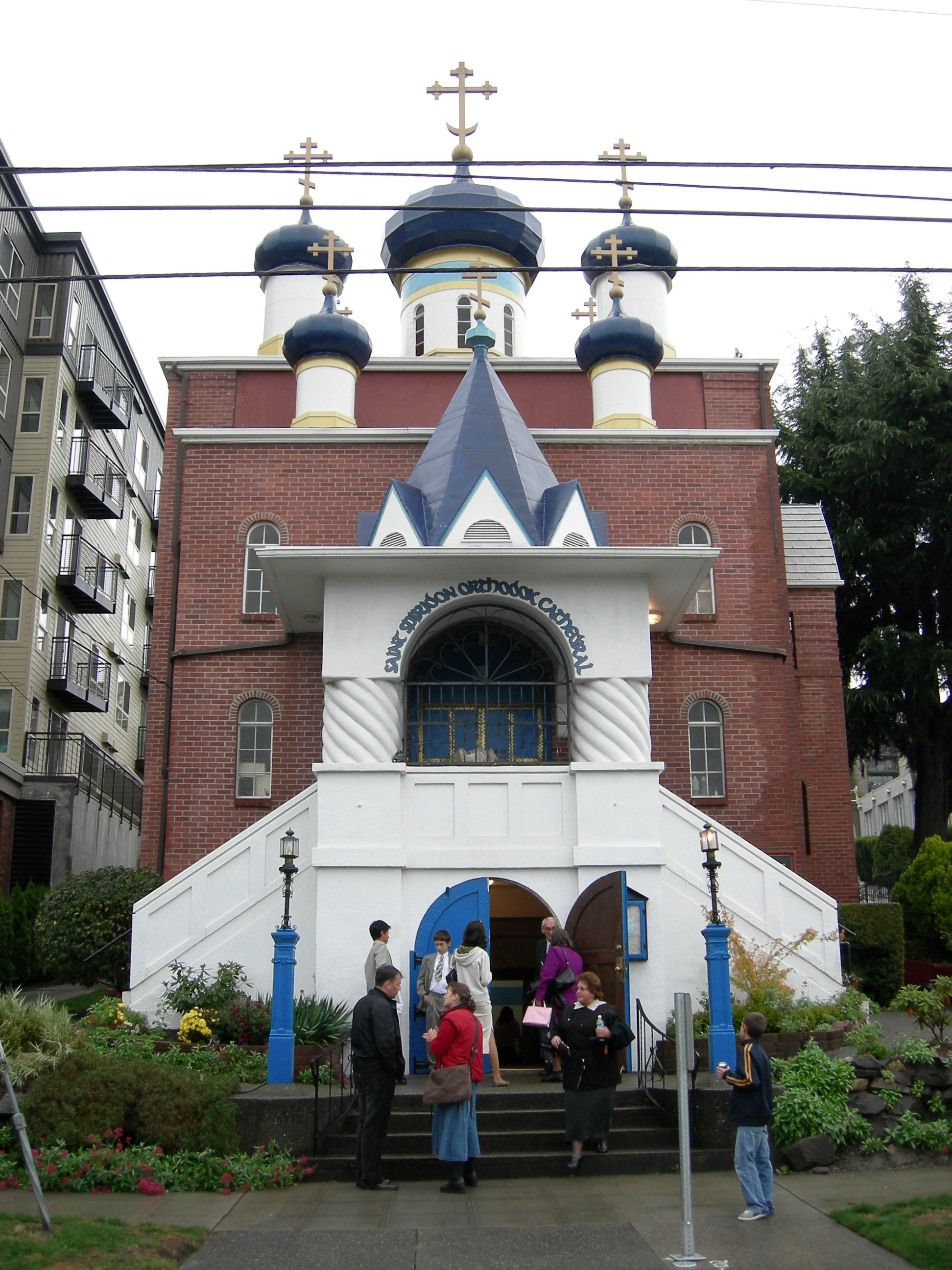
- Saint Spiridon Orthodox Cathedral
- Country: United States
- Denomination: Russian Orthodox
- Website: www.saintspiridon.org

Architecture
- Architect: Ivan Palmaw
- Years built: 1937

Saint Spiridon Orthodox Cathedral is a cathedral of the Orthodox Church of America in the Cascade neighborhood of Seattle, Washington, United States.

Founded in 1895, the cathedral's multi-ethnic congregation has its roots in an Orthodox mission to Alaska in the 18th Century. The present church dates from 1941, designed by Ivan Palmaw in 1931. The church's patron saint is Saint Spyridon.
