= Jaap Weber =

Dutch footballer

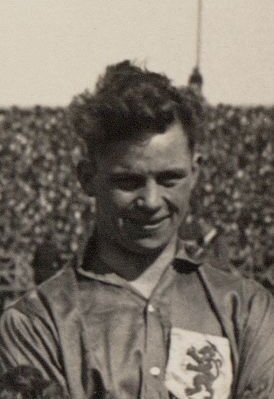

Personal information
- Full name: Jacobus Gerardus Weber
- Date of birth: 4 August 1901
- Place of birth: Rotterdam, Netherlands
- Date of death: 30 September 1979 (aged 78)
- Place of death: Rotterdam, Netherlands

Senior career*
Years	Team	Apps	(Gls)
1921–1925	Feyenoord		
1925–1929	Sparta Rotterdam		

International career
1928–1928	Netherlands	14	(1)
- * Club domestic league appearances and goals

Jacobus Gerardus Weber (4 August 1901 – 30 September 1979) was a Dutch footballer who earned 14 caps for the Netherlands national side between 1927 and 1928, scoring one goal. Weber also participated at the 1928 Summer Olympics, and played club football with Feyenoord and Sparta Rotterdam.
