= Ivor Frederick Wentworth Schofield =

British colonial administrator in West Africa

- Born: 5 July 1904; Worcester, Worcestershire, England
- Died: 25 September 1979 (aged 75); Ballaugh, Isle of Man
- Occupation: Colonial administrator
- Known for: Income tax expert

Ivor Frederick Wentworth Schofield CMG, ED (5 July 1904 – 25 September 1979) was a British colonial administrator in West Africa.

== Life ==
Ivor Frederick Wentworth Schofield was born on 5 July 1904 in Worcester, Worcestershire, England. He attended the King's School in Worcester and Hertford College, Oxford. He joined the Colonial Administrative Service in Nigeria as a cadet in 1927. On 6 May 1930 Schofield was commissioned as a 2nd Lieutenant in the European Reserve Force of Nigeria. During World War II (1939–45) Schofield served with the Royal West African Frontier Force from 1940 to 1942, then with the British Military Administration in Tripolitania from 1942 to 1943. He served in the Dodecanese from 1943 to 1945. He was mentioned in despatches for his services in the Dodecanese. Schofield reached the rank of Lieutenant Colonel (temporary).

Schofield returned to Nigeria after the war. As a Divisional Officer in 1948 he called Ikot-Abasi "a dying place, not a growing one." Rather than bear the high costs of dredging and upgrading the harbor, the government closed the port and customs post on 1 January 1950. He was promoted to Resident in 1949. In 1954 he was appointed Administrative Officer, Staff Grade, in the Western Region of Nigeria. He held this rank in June 1957 when he was made a CMG. In 1958 Schofield became Commissioner of the Inland Revenue in the Western Region. Schofield officially retired in 1959, but was retained on contract until December 1960. He was Administrator of Income Tax in Southern Cameroons from 1960 to 1961, Commissioner of Income Tax in the Gambia from 1964 to 1966 and Adviser on Income Tax in the Gambia from 1967 to 1970 before finally retiring.

After his retirement Ivor Schofield moved to Saint Martin, Guernsey. He died in Ballaugh, Isle of Man on 25 September 1979 The Bodleian Library, Oxford, has a large archive of personal papers from Schofield's African Colonial Service.

== Sources ==
- "A 'West African' CMG, campaign and long service group of 8". Aberdeen Medals.
- "Papers of Ivor F.W. Schofield". Bodleian Library of Commonwealth & African Studies at Rhodes House.
- Smith (2013). "Ikot Abasi: From Second Class to Third Class Township, 1917-1950". Alscon.
- "Supplement to the London Gazette" (PDF). 1945-10-18. p. 5099.
- "Supplement to the London Gazette" (PDF). 1957-06-13. p. 3371.
