= Henry Theak =

Australian cricketer

Personal information
- Born: 19 March 1909; Sydney, Australia
- Died: 14 September 1979 (aged 70); Narwee, New South Wales, Australia
- Source: ESPNcricinfo, 3 February 2017

Henry Theak (19 March 1909 – 14 September 1979) was an Australian cricketer. He played twenty-three first-class matches for New South Wales between 1929/30 and 1934/35.

== See also ==
- List of New South Wales representative cricketers
