= Arthian Davies =

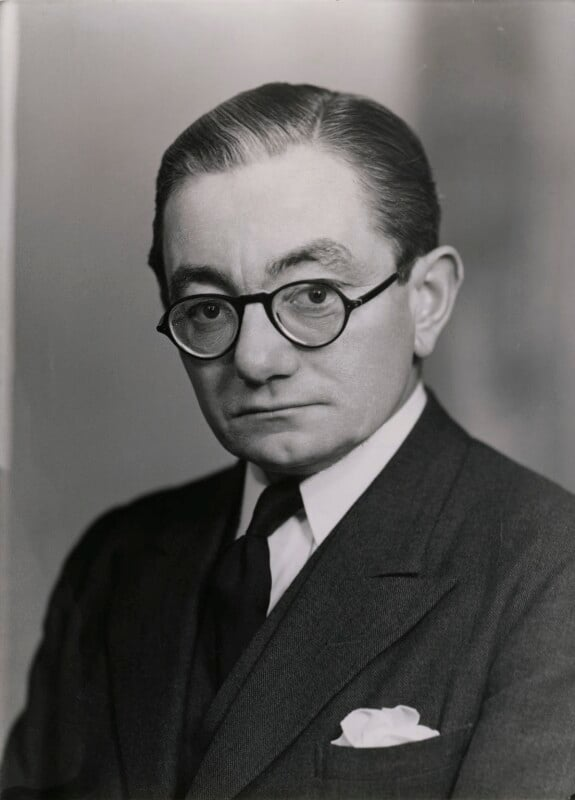
Davies in 1949

Sir William Arthian Davies (10 May 1901 – 19 September 1979) was a lawyer and judge in England and Wales.

Davies was educated at Dulwich College and Trinity College, Oxford, where he took a First in Jurisprudence. He was called to the bar in 1925 and took silk in 1947.

He was appointed a judge of the High Court and assigned to the Probate, Divorce and Admiralty Division on 1 October 1952, receiving the customary knighthood a few days later. He was transferred to the Queen's Bench Division on 3 April 1959. Davies was promoted to be a Lord Justice of Appeal on 9 January 1961. Following that appointment, he was made a member of the Privy Council. He retired from his judicial office on 30 September 1974.
