= Babe Bagby =

- Catcher
- Born: August 21, 1912; Callaway County, Missouri, U.S.
- Died: September 10, 1979 (aged 67); Los Angeles, California, U.S.
- Batted: Unknown Threw: Unknown

Negro league baseball debut
- 1937, for the Cincinnati Tigers

Last appearance
- 1937, for the Cincinnati Tigers
- Stats at Baseball Reference

Teams
- Cincinnati Tigers (1937)

Motrin Alexander “Babe” Bagby, also listed as Bagley (August 21, 1912 – September 10, 1979), was an American professional baseball catcher in the Negro leagues. He played with the Cincinnati Tigers in 1937.
