= Enid Foster =

American artist

Enid Bauer Foster
- Born: 28 October 1895; San Francisco, California
- Died: 20 September 1979 (aged 83); St. Helena, California
- Known for: Sculpture, monotype pen drawings

Enid Bauer Foster (October 28, 1895 – September 20, 1979) was an American artist, sculptor, poet, playwright and performing artist best known in later life for her oil paintings and especially her monotype pen drawings, a medium she developed. She was at the center of Sausalito's 1950s–1960s art colony.

== Early life ==
Born in San Francisco, Foster grew up in a wealthy, Bay Area society family with homes in Sausalito, Ross and San Francisco. At age 17, her parents sent her to New York City to study art and sculpture with Chester Beach. By her early 20s, Foster was a nationally recognized sculptor.

Returning to San Francisco, Foster received commissions to create sculptures for Golden Gate Park, buildings and dignitaries. She moved to Europe around 1930 where she studied with Frank Dobson and Augustus John. In 1938, she returned to the Bay Area, settling in Sausalito. One major commission upon her return was a large bas relief, The Three Fates, for Mountain View Cemetery in Oakland. As foundries were redirected toward the World War II war effort, Foster switched to making smaller sculptures. By 1950, she had turned her attention to flat art and other creative outlets such as writing and performance.

== Artistry ==
The oils, drawings and especially the monotype pen drawings Foster created in Sausalito in the 1950s and 1960s remain her most significant body of work. Although her work was largely ignored by critics, curators and gallery owners during those years, she did have a brief showing at the San Francisco Museum of Art in 1953 and some galleries. Critic John Moreland of the Oakland Tribune wrote "Miss Foster’s true genius lies in what she calls her monotype pens, a form of pictorial satire... In a sure sense she is a social satirist and is in the line of descent from Hogarth and Rowlandson." Her friend, photographer Clarence John Laughlin, described her as a "weird fusion of Aubrey Beardsley and George Grosz."

The monotype pen drawing, a medium Foster probably invented and named, remains almost exclusively hers. She placed blobs of paint on a sheet of glass and rolled a sheet of paper over it to produce random patterns, which she’d study until she visualized a picture. She then formed open areas with China white and created the picture in India ink with a crowquill pen.

== Career ==
Foster became a leader in the Sausalito creative community, once referred to as "Sausalito's Dame Edith Sitwell", and quoted in columns such as Herb Caen's in the San Francisco Chronicle. Foster was an activist in community matters championing fellow artists and working with town leaders, while occasionally butting heads. When Sausalito failed to continue the Sausalito Art Festival (started in 1952), Foster led the efforts for its revival. In addition to her monotype pens and paintings, she wrote and directed satirical performance pieces and masques, frequently serving as costume designer and actor.

Foster was prolific. Although her work is scattered throughout the world and barely represented in galleries and museums, Allan and Carol Hayes were able to locate and photograph more than 150 pieces for Enid Foster: Artist, Sculptor, Poet, Playwright, Creative Force, Ringleader, Cultural Icon. Many works were available because collectors who prized her art had donated their pieces to the Sausalito Historical Society, which became the largest single repository of her work.

In 1971, Foster left Sausalito to live in France, intending to remain there for the rest of her life. However, in 1974, she suffered a stroke and returned to America. She spent her last years in convalescent homes in Marin County and died in St. Helena, California in 1979.
