= Elizabeth Simpson Drewry =

American politician (1893–1979)

- In office 1951–1966

Personal details
- Born: September 22, 1893 Motley, Virginia, U.S.
- Died: September 24, 1979 (aged 86) Welch, West Virginia, U.S.
- Party: Democratic
- Education: Bluefield State Teacher's College

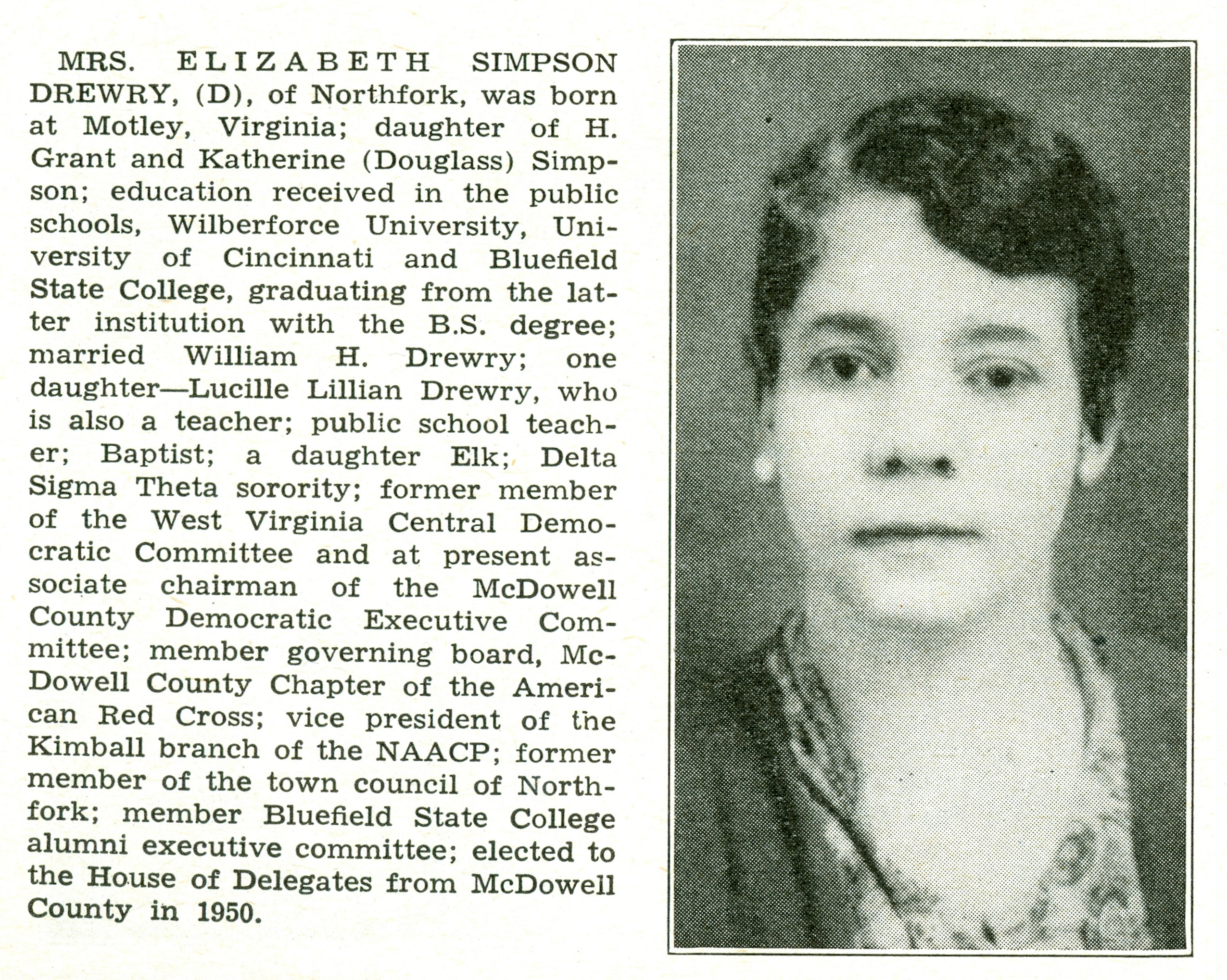
Elizabeth Simpson Drewry

Elizabeth Simpson Drewry (September 22, 1893 – September 24, 1979) was an American politician from the state of West Virginia. In 1950, she became the first African-American woman to be elected to the West Virginia Legislature. She served eight terms in the House of Delegates.

== Early life and education ==
Drewry was born September 22, 1893, in Motley, Virginia. She was the oldest of 10 children. Her family moved to Elkhorn, West Virginia, when she was a child. Her family was part of the earliest generation of the Great Migration. In the late nineteenth and early twentieth centuries, many African Americans moved to West Virginia attracted by work opportunities in the growing mining communities across the state. Between 1900-1910, McDowell County, where Drewry grew up and attended public school, experienced the largest increase in African-American residents in the state. By the end of the decade, thirty percent of the population of McDowell County was African American.

Drewry's father owned a successful barbershop and a home in Elkhorn. Drewry's family was part of a growing black middle class, a group that stressed education as a means of personal improvement and racial uplift in the early twentieth century. She graduated from the Bluefield State Teacher's College in 1934 with a Bachelor of Science degree in Elementary Education. She had also previously attended Wilberforce University and the University of Cincinnati. She was married to Bluefield professor William H. Drewry. They had one child, a daughter named Lucille. As an active member of Delta Sigma Theta sorority, the National Association of Colored Women, and her church, Drewry instituted community programs to improve the lives of adults and children in need and spoke for racial justice and education.

== Teaching and political career ==
In 1910, Elizabeth began teaching in the black schools of coal camps along Elkhorn Creek. Her career teaching in the McDowell County black public school system spanned almost fifty years. From early on in her career, Drewry was active in state and local educational associations as well as political and civic organizations. She worked as a Republican precinct poll worker in 1921 and supported the Republican party for many years. However, in 1936 she changed her political affiliation to the Democratic party. She was also involved with the American Red Cross, the Clark City Council, the Northfork Town Council, the McDowell County Public Library, and the McDowell County Democratic Executive Committee.

In 1946 and 1948, Drewry unsuccessfully ran for a seat in the West Virginia House of Delegates. In 1950, Drewry was elected to the West Virginia House of Delegates, making her the first African-American woman elected to the West Virginia Legislature. Drewry served as a delegate for 13 years from 1951 to 1966, when a stroke forced her to retire. In her first term, she publicly exposed a bribe she received from the coal industry. The incident put her on the front pages of newspapers in Charleston, West Virginia, and Pittsburgh and earned her the support of coal miners. During her time in the House of Delegates, Drewry chaired the Military Affairs and Health Committees and served on the Judiciary, Education, Labor and Industry, Counties, Districts, and Municipalities committees. Drewry successfully sponsored a bill to allow women to serve on juries in West Virginia. Throughout her service, she advocated for civil rights, social justice, and health reform. In particular, the bills she sponsored and introduced supported waged workers, teachers, and women.

== Death and legacy ==
Drewry died on September 24, 1979, in Welch, West Virginia. In 2005, the West Virginia Archives and History installed a state historical marker in honor of Drewry in Northfork, West Virginia.
