= Sam Rowbotham =

English footballer (1912–1979)

Personal information
- Full name: Sam Rowbotham
- Date of birth: 6 December 1912
- Place of birth: Rotherham, England
- Date of death: 7 September 1979 (aged 66)
- Place of death: Peterborough, England
- Height: 5 ft 10 1/2 in (1.79 m)
- Positions: Left half; inside left

Senior career*
Years	Team	Apps	(Gls)
1931–1933	Rotherham United	3	(1)
1933–1934	Scarborough		
1934–1935	Darlington	17	(1)
1936–1940	Peterborough United	118	(1)
- * Club domestic league appearances and goals

Sam Rowbotham (6 December 1912 – 7 September 1979) was an English footballer who played as a centre forward or inside left in the Football League for Rotherham United and Darlington. He also played non-league football for Scarborough and Peterborough United.

== Life and career ==
Rowbotham was born in Rotherham, which was then in the West Riding of Yorkshire, in 1912. He joined Rotherham United in August 1931, and turned professional the following February. Because of injuries, Rowbotham made his first-team debut on 27 February, playing at left half in a 2–0 win at home to Hull City in the Third Division North. That proved to be his only appearance of the season, but he was retained for 1932–33. Playing at inside left, he scored his first Football League goal in a 5–2 loss to New Brighton, and made one more appearance before leaving the club at the end of the season.

Although he had played little first-team football, Rowbotham had been a regular with Rotherham's reserve team in the Midland League, and when he became available he was snapped up by Midland League club Scarborough. He went straight into the team at left half, impressed, and remained in the team for the rest of the season.

In July 1934, he signed for Third Division North club Darlington. He made his debut at right half on 28 September in a 3–0 loss to Gateshead, and played once more in that position before having a run of games at the end of the season, taking over at left half from Joe Hodgson. He scored once, a 40-yard (37 m) free kick against his former club, Rotherham United. He played in the first four matches of the 1935–36 season, to take his appearance total to 17, after which Hodgson returned to favour.

Released by Darlington on a free transfer, Rowbotham returned to the Midland League with Peterborough United. He played regularly, missing only eight Midland League matches over the next three seasons, and continued for a further season in the 1939–40 emergency competitions.

Rowbotham worked at Peter Brotherhood's armaments factory in Peterborough during the Second World War, and played for their works team after his club closed down for the duration. He remained in the area after the war, and died in Peterborough in 1979 at the age of 66.

== Notes ==
- Many sources give Rowbotham the first name of Samuel, but the only birth registered under a similar name in Rotherham in the relevant time period was plain Sam.
