= Osmium oxide =

Osmium oxide may refer to:

- Osmium dioxide, OsO_{2}
- Osmium tetroxide, OsO_{4}
