= Woldemar Weyl =

German-born scientist

Woldemar Anatol Weyl (1901 – July 30, 1975) was a German-born scientist.

Weyl taught at the Kaiser Wilhelm Institute between 1932 and 1936, when he began traveling to the United States as a visiting professor at Pennsylvania State University. Due to the increasing influence of the Nazi Party, Weyl choose not to return to Germany and was offered full tenure at PSU in 1938. In 1960, Weyl and mathematician Haskell Curry were appointed to the first two Evan Pugh Professorships at Penn State. Weyl died in State College, Pennsylvania on July 30, 1975, aged 74.
