= Nora Platiel =

Nora Platiel (14 January 1896 in Bochum – 5 September 1979 in Kassel) was a Social Democratic politician, lawyer and resistance fighter against Nazism. Platiel received the Grand Cross of Merit of the Federal Republic of Germany. In 1969, she was awarded the Wilhelm Leuschner Medal, the highest honor of the state of Hesse.
