= Marianne Kreidl =

Austrian chemist

- Born: Marianne von Bronneck; April 22, 1885; Prague, then Kingdom of Bohemia
- Died: September 9, 1979 (aged 94)
- Education: University of Vienna

Marianne Kreidl (née von Bronneck, April 22, 1885, in Prague – September 9, 1979, in New York City, NY, USA), was one of the earliest women chemists to attend Vienna University. As a result of the occupation of Austria by the Nazis in March 1938, her assets were confiscated. She was able to emigrate to the United States, where she continued to do research at Madison Foundation for Biochemical Research and at New York Medical College.

== Family ==
Marianne Goldreich Edle von Bronneck was born on April 22, 1885, in Prague, which was then part of the Kingdom of Bohemia. Her father was Otto Goldreich Edler von Bronneck (1854–1913), a lawyer. Her grandfather was Philip Goldreich von Bronneck (1812–1885), a merchant and landowner. Her mother was Wilhelmine “Wilma” Pick (1865–1932), a daughter of Ernst Pick (-1934).

== Education ==
Marianne von Bronneck studied at the Ist Chemical Institute in 1908 with Josef Herzig (1853–1924). Her thesis was “Studien über Laktonfarbstoffe” (Studies on lactone dyes). Her publications in Europe tend to appear under her maiden name.

== Austria ==
Marianne von Bronneck married Alexander Kreidl (1879-1937). Alexander was an engineer. His brother Ignaz Kreidl was a chemist and industrialist. The brothers co-owned a number of patents. Alexander Kreidl died on December 29, 1937, in Vienna.

Conditions in Austria worsened significantly as a result of the Anschluss on March 12, 1938, when Austria was annexed by Nazi Germany. As a Jew, Marianne was required to register her assets with the Assets Transfer Office of the Ministerium für Handel und Verkehr (Ministry of Commerce and Transportation) by a decree for Reporting of Jewish assets on April 26, 1938. They were subsequently confiscated.

On the evening of March 18, 1938, less than a week after Austria was annexed, the records of the Federal Police Directorate of Vienna show that Ignaz Kreidl's home was searched by police officers. Marianne Kreidl and Hilde Mathé were present in addition to Ignaz Kreidl and his second wife Eva. Police officers took items including money, jewelry, and business letters. Ignaz Kreidl was arrested and imprisoned without charge. Soon after Eva Kreidl fell from the fourth floor of her home and died.

== United States ==
Marianne Kreidl was able to leave Vienna and emigrate to the United States in 1938. She moved to New York City, where she worked as a scientist at the Madison Foundation for Biochemical Research. In 1953, publishing under the name "Marianne Kreidl", she co-authored an article on a new cytological technique with Rudolph Keller and Bernard Chiego. By 1955 she was researching carbamate reactions in the calcium and phosphorus cycles, at the Department of Biochemistry at the New York Medical College.

In later life Marianne Kreidl returned to Vienna, where she died on September 9, 1979. She is buried in Grinzinger Friedhof Cemetery.
