= Silvio Dissegna =

Italian Venerable

Venerable Silvio Dissegna
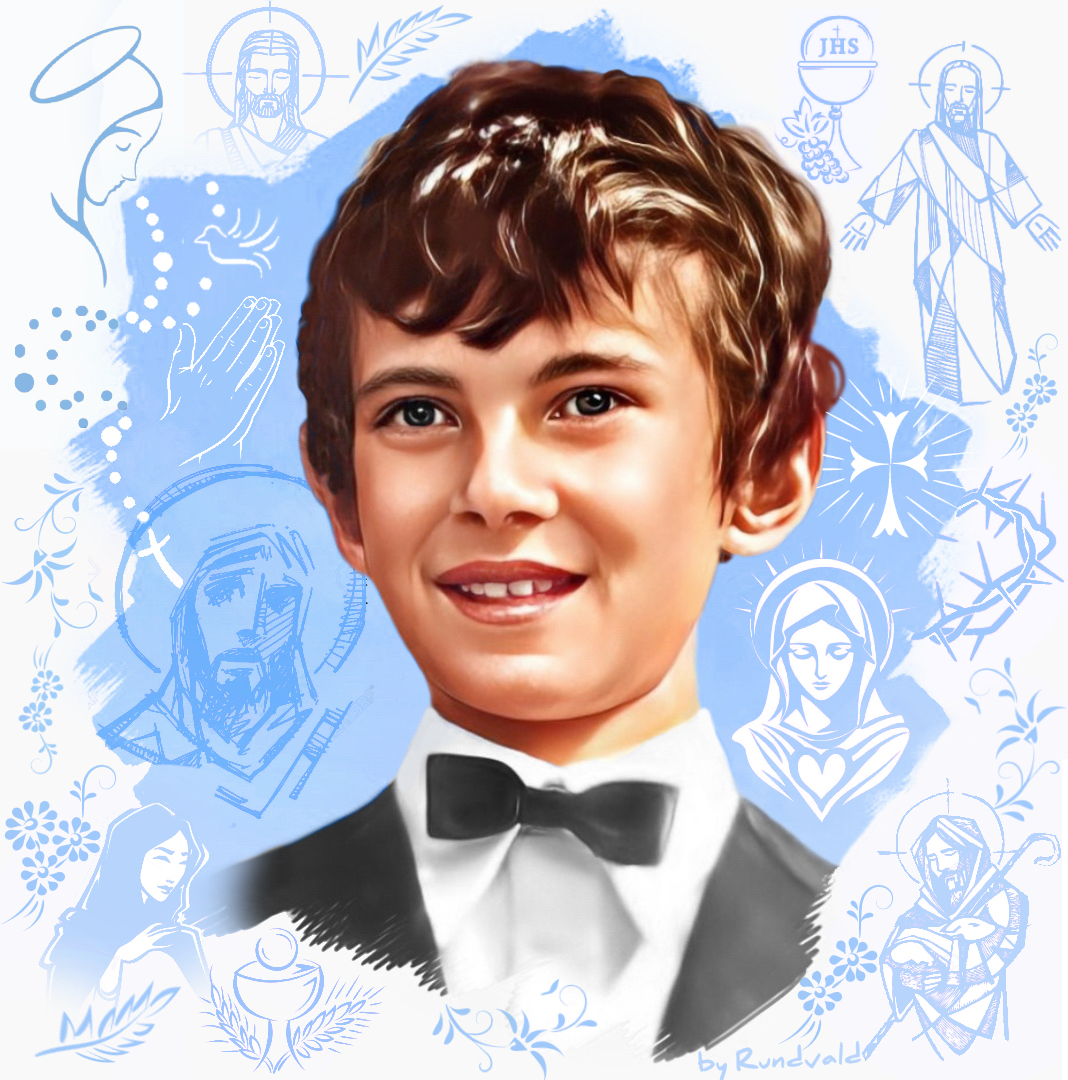
- Born: 1 July 1967; Moncalieri, Turin, Italy
- Died: 24 September 1979 (aged 12); Poirino, Turin, Italy

Silvio Dissegna (1 July 1967 – 24 September 1979) was an Italian Roman Catholic child who died from bone cancer. Dissegna was a popular child known for his constant smile and deep love for Jesus Christ and his mother; he likewise recited the rosary and asked for frequent reception of the Holy Communion.

His beatification process was opened in 1995 in Turin and culminated two decades later after the confirmation of his life of heroic virtue allowed for Pope Francis to title Dissegna as venerable on 7 November 2014.

== Life ==
Silvio Dissegna was born on 1 July 1967 in Turin at 12:10 am as the first of two children to Ottavio Dissegna and Gabriella Martignon. His little brother was Carlo (b. 6 July 1968). Dissegna received his baptism on 6 July in the hospital chapel from the Dominican priest Domenico Moine with the names Silvio Antonio Giovanni.

In late September 1973 Dissegna began grade school in Poirino. He ended school on 7 April 1978 due to his illness and his hospitalization in Moncalieri on 10 April. Dissegna, a popular child with a constant smile, was known for being full of life who desired becoming a school teacher when he was older. His teachers perceived him to be clever in his class and his notebooks were full of descriptions about nature and games as well as his future aspirations. Dissegna liked to ride his bike and watch cartoons on television. He received his First Communion on 7 September 1975 alongside his brother Carlo. It was following this event that Dissegna became a frequent attender in Masses each week. On 25 December 1977, Christmas, his mother gifted the child with his own typewriter and dedicated his first page to her: "Thank you, mamma, for bringing me into the world for giving me life which is so beautiful! I have a great desire to live!"

Dissegna developed bone cancer in 1978 just before he turned eleven when he began to suffer terrible and constant pain in his legs in the spring (this manifested around January). He made several doctor visits who prescribed certain medications to him. But the pain grew more intense over time which led to several tests being performed which resulted in the diagnosis on 13 May 1978 that Dissegna had bone cancer. But he did not despair at the diagnosis unlike his parents. He said to his distressed father: "Papa, have courage! Jesus will not abandon us". He said to his mother: "If I die it is not important. I will suffer to the end". On 4 June 1978 he asked his friends: "Tell Don Luigi to bring me Communion at home every day"; Luigi Delsanto did this for him. He dedicated his time to reciting rosaries and offering his sufferings for missionaries and the conversion of sinners as well as for the three popes who reigned in his life. He received his Confirmation in a wheelchair on 21 May 1978 from Father Piero Giacobbo. On the occasions when he was hospitalized he asked the chaplain to bring him frequent Communion. From 13 June 1978 to January 1979 (other hospitalizations from 24 July 21 August, 18 September 16 October, and 20 November) he had seven hospitalizations in Paris for treatment with his father remaining at his side on these trips. On one such trip the individual in the bed next to him was in pain and began cursing. This upset Dissegna who wept at the person's obscenities.

Dissegna's father Ottavio sent a heartfelt letter to Pope Paul VI on 27 May 1978 asking for "a prayer and a blessing for Silvio". Paul VI responded on 2 June with a letter assuring Ottavio of his support while exhorting the Dissegna's "to trust in divine goodness". Dissegna's last visit to a church was in mid-January 1979.

Dissegna lost his sight on 10 June 1979 (following swelling; the left pupil deteriorated on 26 July) and then his hearing that 4 September (prior to his death) due to the cancer's aggressive growth within him; large sores opened across his body in May after his left leg broke due to the weakening bone. Dissegna died in his home with a smile on his face in the evening on 24 September 1979 in Poirino. He had received the Anointing of the Sick the morning of his death as well as the Viaticum; he was lucid when the parish priest, Vincenzo Pansa, was there that morning to administer both to the ailing child. His funeral was celebrated in the Poirino parish church on 26 September; thirty priests and around a thousand people attended his funeral.

== Beatification process ==
The beatification process opened in the Turin archdiocese in a diocesan process that the Cardinal Archbishop of Turin, Giovanni Saldarini, inaugurated on 8 February 1995 and which Cardinal Severino Poletto later closed at a solemn Mass on 25 October 2001. The formal introduction to the cause came under Pope John Paul II on 7 March 1995 after the Congregation for the Causes of Saints decreed the nihil obstat and titled Dissegna as a Servant of God. The Congregation later validated the diocesan process in Rome on 8 November 2001 prior to receiving the positio from the postulation in 2010 for in-depth assessment. Theologians met and approved the cause on 5 November 2013 as did the cardinal and bishop members of the Congregation on 21 October 2014.

Cardinal Pietro Palazzini wrote: "The example of Silvio illustrates that children are able to attain heroic virtues and are worthy of canonization". The confirmation of Dissegna's life of heroic virtue allowed for Pope Francis to title the child as venerable on 7 November 2014. The postulator for this cause is Francesca Consolini.
