= Fu Ying (chemist) =

Chinese chemist

Fu Ying (Chinese: 傅鹰; January 19, 1902 – September 7, 1979) was a Chinese chemist, who was a member of the Chinese Academy of Sciences.
