= Grigory Mylnikov =

Soviet ground-attack pilot (1919–1979)

Grigory Mikhailovich Mylnikov
- Григорий Михайлович Мыльников
- Born: 25 May 1919; Yegorievka, Voronezh Governorate, RSFSR
- Died: 26 September 1979 (aged 60); Moscow, USSR
- Military career
- Allegiance: Soviet Union
- Branch: Soviet Air Force
- Service years: 1939 – 1945
- Rank: Lieutenant Colonel
- Unit: 15th Guards Assault Aviation Regiment
- Conflicts: World War II
- Awards: Hero of the Soviet Union (twice)

Grigory Mikhailovich Mylnikov (Russian: Григорий Михайлович Мыльников; 25 May 1919 – 26 September 1979) was a ground-attack pilot in the Soviet Air Forces during the Second World War who was twice awarded the title Hero of the Soviet Union.

== Early life ==
Mylnikov was born on 25 May 1919 in the village of Yegorievka to a Russian family. After completing his seventh year of school in 1936 he went on to attend a trade school in Voronezh. There, he graduated from trade school in 1938 and went on to work at a factory until graduating from the local aeroclub in 1939, after which he entered the army in December. Upon graduation from the Borisoglebsk Military Aviation School of Pilots in November 1940 he was assigned to the 163rd Reserve Aviation Regiment; from February to May 1941 he was part of the 171st Fighter Aviation Regiment, and then he was briefly posted to the 169th Reserve Aviation Regiment until July 1941.

== World War II ==
In July 1941 Mylnikov was reassigned as a pilot to the 174th Assault Aviation Regiment, which was awarded the guards designation and renamed in March 1942 as the 15th Guards Assault Aviation Regiment. He quickly was promoted from pilot to flight commander and continued to rise through the ranks, achieving the position of squadron commander before he was nominated for his first gold star. For much of the war he was tasked with taking out targets attacking besieged Leningrad, and in early 1943 he participated in the breakthrough of the blockade; over the course of 13 sorties he took out ten vehicles, an ammunition depot, four railway cars, four bunkers, and killed over 100 enemy combatants. While leading a group of four Il-2 aircraft on an attack over a stretch of railroad on 19 March 1943 they took out 15 railway cars and caused a significant delay of traffic on the line. On 23 September 1944 Mylnikov was nominated for the title Hero of the Soviet Union for having totaled 192 sorties, which was awarded on 23 February 1945; shortly before that on 14 February 1945 he was nominated for a second gold star for having totaled 223 sorties. During a mission on 21 February 1945 he was badly injured after his Il-2 was hit by an anti-aircraft shell; although he was able to make an emergency landing in Kreuzburg, the severity of his injuries resulted in him being confined to the hospital for the remainder of the war, where he underwent a craniotomy.

Throughout the war he fought in the battles for Leningrad, Novgorod, Vyborg, Tallinn, East Prussia, and other strategically important areas on the Western, Bryansk, Leningrad, and 3rd Belorussian fronts. By the end of the conflict he totaled 226 sorties on the Il-2, taking out nine tanks, seven aircraft on the ground, four ammunition depots, 58 railway cars, 73 anti-aircraft artillery positions, 115 cars, 26 machine-gun nests, and over 1000 enemy combatants.

== Postwar ==
Eventually Mylnikov was released from the hospital in August 1945, but since he was unable to return to flying for health reasons he had to leave active duty for the reserve in November. From 1948 to 1949 he worked as a senior engineer at the import department of the Ministry of Fishing. After graduating from the Institute of National Economics named after G.V. Plekhanov in 1954 he went on to hold various management positions; initially he was deputy manager and later head of portions of several state construction trusts, but in 1958 he became director of a grocery store in the Zhdanovsky district of Moscow. The next year he became head of the Ostankino hotel, and from 1961 to 1962 he headed a general store. From then until 1969 he was deputy director of several restaurants in the Leningradsky district of Moscow. He lived for the remainder of his life in Moscow, where he died on 26 September 1979 and was buried in the Vagankovo cemetery.

== Awards and honors ==
- Twice Hero of the Soviet Union (23 February 1945 and 19 April 1945)
- Order of Lenin (23 February 1945)
- Three Order of the Red Banner (16 August 1942, 21 June 1944, and 22 February 1945)
- Order of Alexander Nevsky (24 March 1943)
- Order of the Patriotic War 1st class (12 September 1944)
- Order of the Red Star (19 December 1941)
