= Renton History Museum =

Coordinates: 47.4801°N 122.2034°W

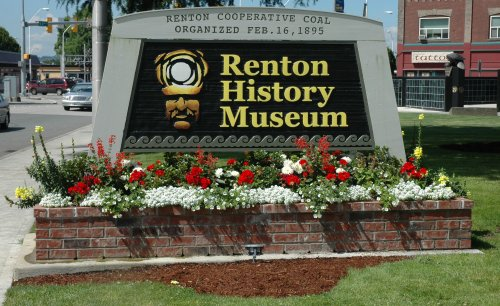
Renton History Museum sign

The Renton History Museum is a repository for objects and archives significant to the city of Renton in the state of Washington, United States. The museum has objects and archives of Renton's history and has exhibits and public programs for the community and visitors. It is a joint initiative between the city of Renton and the Renton Historical Society, a non-profit organization providing private sector support for the museum.

The institution states that its "mission is to preserve, document, interpret, and educate about the history of greater Renton in ways that are accessible to diverse people of all ages." The museum's vision is phrased "Capture the Past, Educate the Present, Inspire the Future." Presently, it is the only heritage organization in the city of Renton.

== Collections, exhibits ==
The Renton History Museum houses collections consisting of objects, photographs, and archives representing the history of greater Renton. The museum cares for over 90,000 objects and 13,000 photographs that document Renton's cultural, social, and industrial history, spanning all periods of the city's past. The collection is particularly notable for photographs covering the period 1880 through 1940, showing images of local coal mining and railroads as well as the civic and social life of its residents.

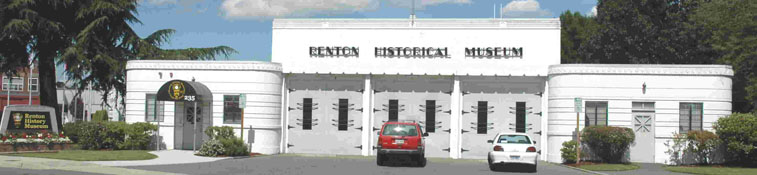
Renton History Museum in 2006

Recent exhibits staged in the museum include:

- 100 Years at Renton High
- Sustaining a City
- The Twilight Zone Art Show
- Hero's Feast: Finding Community through Dungeons & Dragons

The museum also organizes and hosts a number of public programs, such as RenTeens Adult programs and family programs incorporate activities such as storytelling and performances and lecture series relevant to Renton's rich history. There are also classroom programs on Coast Salish-Duwamish life, local culture, and local coal mining for students from 4th to 8th grades.

== Location ==
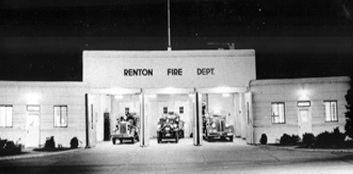
Fire Station #1 in 1944

Housed in an Art Deco-style former fire station, the museum is located in downtown Renton at 235 Mill Avenue South. The former fire station was constructed in 1942 and is the last remaining structure built under the Works Progress Administration (WPA). The photo, taken from the Renton History Museum website, shows the fire station in 1944 with it was "Fire Station #1."

Today, the station is home to the museum's exhibits, collections and research library. The research library is open to the public by appointment.

The museum is also close to local shops and restaurants as well as the public library and the Liberty Park. It offers free parking to visitors.
