= Sara Mustonen (skier) =

Finnish alpine skier

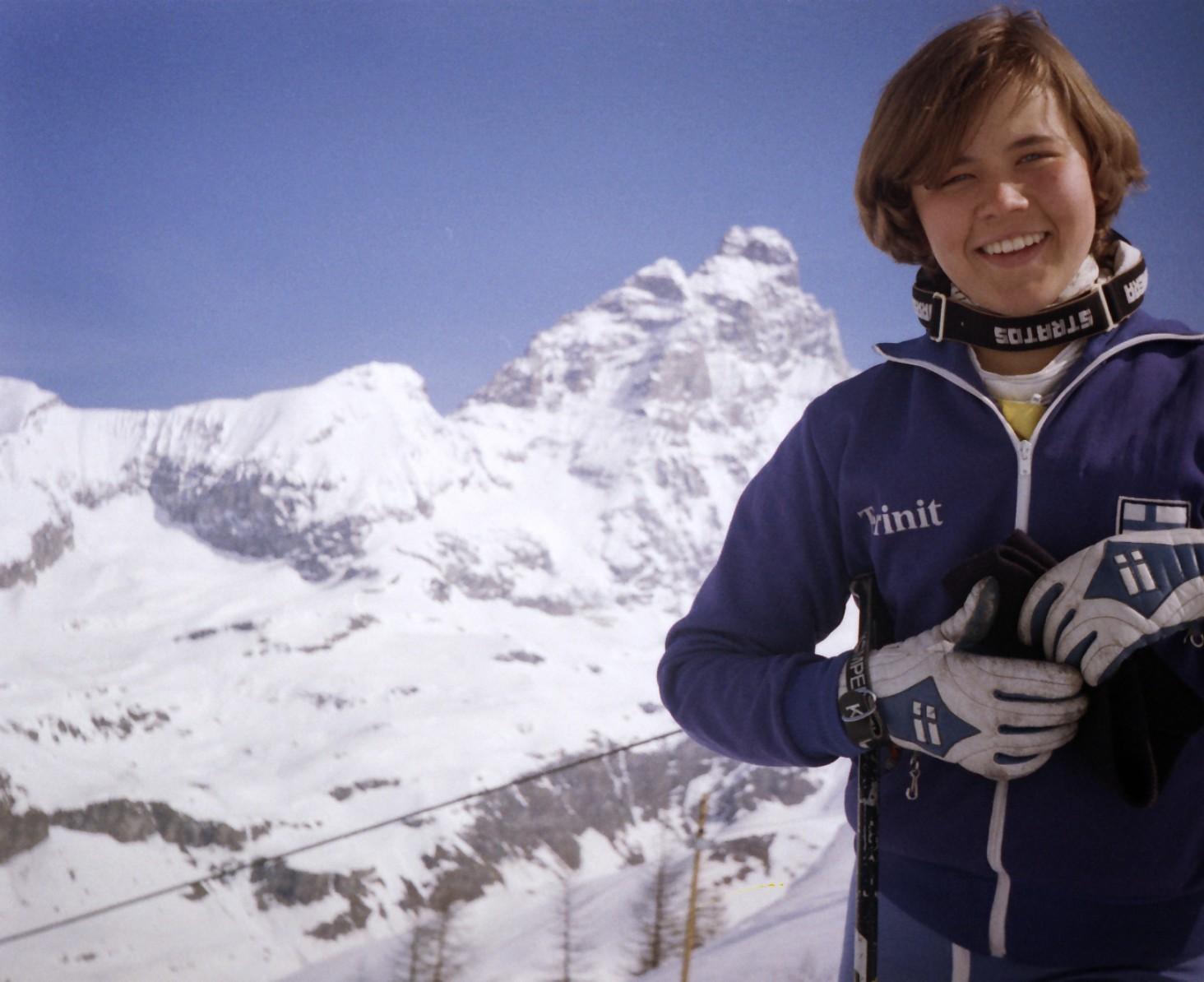
- Sara Mustonen in Cervinia, Italy, circa 1977

Personal information
- Full name: Sara Kristiina Mustonen
- Born: 23 December 1962 Rovaniemi, Finland
- Died: 12 September 1979 (aged 16) Hintertux, Austria

Sport
- Sport: Skiing
- Club: Ounasvaaran Hiihtoseura

Sara Kristiina Mustonen (23 December 1962 – 12 September 1979) was a Finnish alpine skier. She is the youngest skier ever to win the Finnish alpine ski championship with her gold medal in the women's slalom in 1977 when she was only 14 years old.

Between 1975 and 1979 Mustonen won as many as 25 medals in Finnish alpine ski championships, 10 of which in women's category. She won the slalom in 1977 and 1978, giant slalom in 1978 and 1979, and downhill in 1979. She represented the skiing club Ounasvaaran Hiihtoseura of her native Rovaniemi and was a member of the Finnish alpine ski team since 1976.

Sara Mustonen started her career as early as in April 1968 at the age of five landing second in the Lapland championships – in the category for girls under 10 years of age. In her next race a week later she finished first, the position she was to hold in her age group and beyond until her untimely death in September 1979. In 1973 she finished fourth at Italy's Trofeo Topolino. In March 1976 Mustonen won all three disciplines at the Nordic Junior Championships (Kalle Anka Trofén) in Duved, Åre as well as earned her first national championship medals in women's category.

In 1978 Mustonen was the only woman participant to represent Finland in the Alpine World Skiing Championships in Garmisch-Partenkirchen. She finished 40th in downhill and 44th in giant slalom. In slalom she dropped out in the second run. She competed in the 1978 Swedish Alpine Championships in Dundret, Gällivare, finishing third in giant slalom and fourth in slalom. Mustonen was voted by Finnish sports journalists as the best alpine skier in Finland in two consecutive years, 1977 and 1978.

Sara Mustonen was killed in a skiing accident in Hintertux, Austria, after having fallen down into a crevasse during a joint training session on the glacier. At the time of the accident, she was under the auspices of the Finnish alpine ski team who were running a training camp at the location.

== Literature ==
- Hiltula, Kari (2008). "Sara Mustonen ja Hintertuxin varjo". In Roiko-Jokela, Heikki; Sironen, Esa (eds.). Hevosten jäljillä. Suomen urheiluhistoriallisen seuran vuosikirja 2008. Helsinki: Minerva Kustannus Oy. pp. 77–107. ISBN 978-952-492-200-5.
- Mustonen, Saara (2002). Sara. Tampere: MC-Pilot Kustannus. ISBN 952-464-019-8.
- Raevuori, Antero (2004). Valkoinen sirkus: alppihiihdon tarina. Helsinki: Werner Söderström Osakeyhtiö. ISBN 951-0-29534-5.
- Teronen, Arto & Vuolle, Jouko (2011). Urheilijat maineen poluilla: kiveen hakatut. Helsinki: Kirjapaja. ISBN 978-952-247-223-6.
