= Monty Wilkinson (footballer) =

English footballer (1908–1979)

Personal information
- Full name: Jonathan Montague Wilkinson
- Date of birth: 18 July 1908
- Place of birth: Esh Winning, England
- Date of death: 19 September 1979 (aged 71)
- Place of death: Newcastle upon Tyne, England
- Height: 5 ft 8 in (1.73 m)
- Position: Winger

Senior career*
Years	Team	Apps	(Gls)
1923–	Esh Winning		
- Kelloe Colliery
–1925	Esh Winning		
1925–1926	Durham City		
1926–1927	Crook Town		
1927–1929	Newcastle United	27	(11)
1929–1931	Everton	11	(2)
1931–1933	Blackpool	60	(15)
1933–1940	Charlton Athletic	224	(48)
- * Club domestic league appearances and goals

Jonathan Montague Wilkinson (18 July 1908 – 19 September 1979) was an English professional footballer who made over 220 appearances in the Football League for Charlton Athletic as a forward. He also played League football for Blackpool, Newcastle United and Everton.

== Personal life ==
Wilkinson served in the Royal Air Force during the Second World War and saw action in Burma. After retiring from football, he lived in Lincoln and later managed a cinema in Washington, Tyne and Wear. In 2014, Wilkinson was the subject of an e-book, titled Dad's Story.

== Career statistics ==
Appearances and goals by club, season and competition
Club	Season	League			FA Cup		Total	
Club	Season	Division	Apps	Goals	Apps	Goals	Apps	Goals
Newcastle United	1927–28	First Division	16	9	0	0	16	9
Newcastle United	1928–29	First Division	11	2	0	0	11	2
Newcastle United	Total		27	11	0	0	27	11
Everton	1929–30	First Division	6	0	0	0	6	0
Everton	1930–31	First Division	5	2	1	0	6	2
Everton	Total		11	2	1	0	12	2
Career total			38	13	1	0	39	13

== Honours ==
Charlton Athletic

- Football League Second Division second-place promotion: 1935–36
- Football League Third Division South: 1934–35
