= Ytterbium compounds =

Chemical compounds containing the element ytterbium

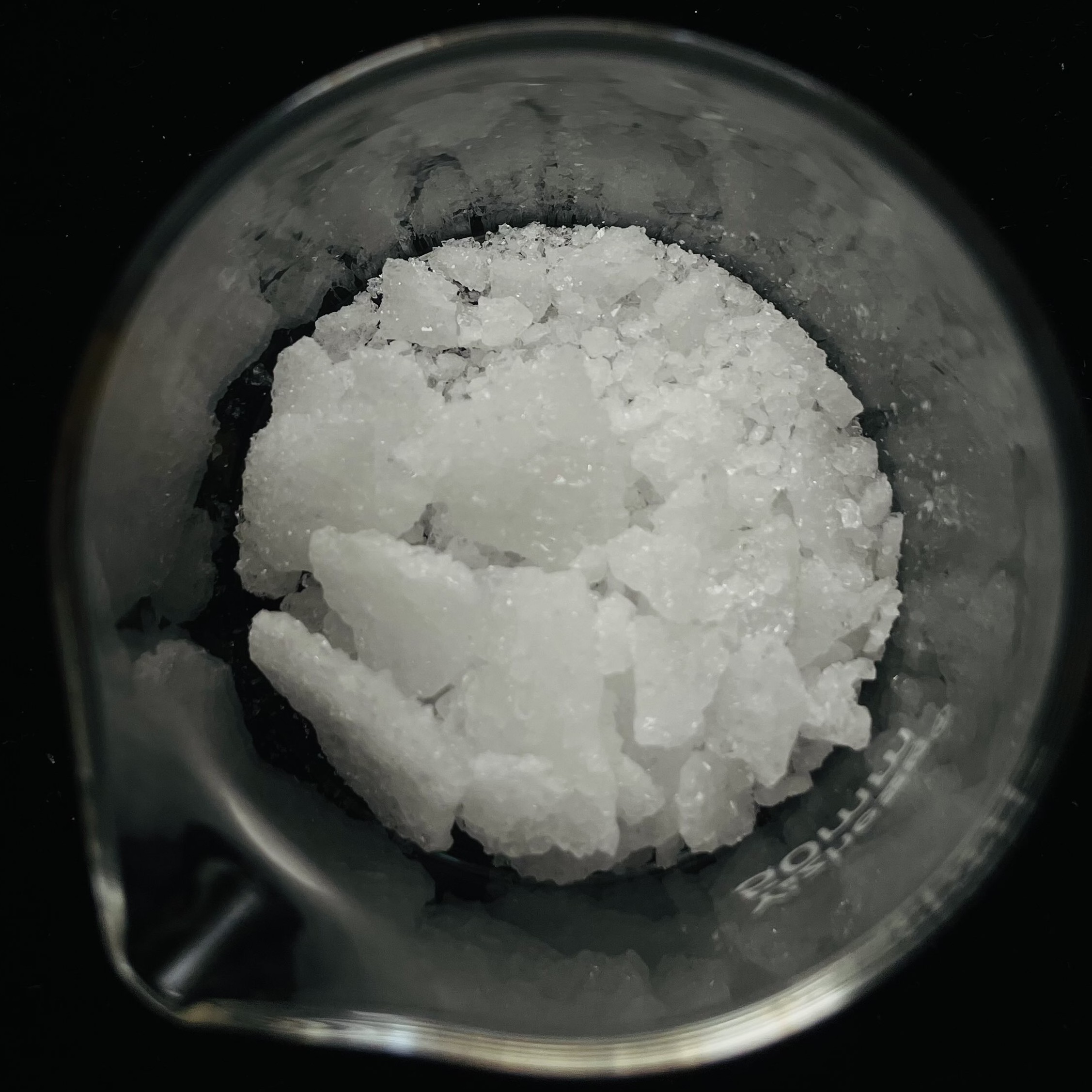
Ytterbium(III) sulfate, a compound of ytterbium

Ytterbium compounds are compounds formed by the lanthanide element ytterbium (Yb). Ytterbium commonly occurs in the +3 oxidation state, with the 4f^{13} electronic configuration, but unlike most lanthanides it also forms a substantial range of stable +2 compounds. Yb^{2+} has the closed-shell 4f^{14} configuration and is particularly prominent in the dihalides, monochalcogenides, hydrides and organometallic compounds. Intermediate and mixed valence between the +2 and +3 states also occurs in numerous borides, carbides, silicides, pnictides and intermetallic compounds, giving ytterbium chemistry an unusually strong connection with Kondo, heavy fermion and other strongly correlated electronic phenomena.

Ytterbium forms binary compounds with most nonmetals, including oxides, sulfides, selenides, tellurides, halides, hydrides, borides, carbides, silicides and pnictides. The trivalent sesquioxide Yb_{2}O_{3} has the cubic bixbyite structure, whereas divalent YbO and the monochalcogenides YbS, YbSe and YbTe adopt rock-salt-related structures. The hydride system is unusual among the lanthanides: YbH_{2} contains predominantly divalent ytterbium, while the hydrogen-richer phase Yb_{3}H_{8} is mixed-valent and a conventional stoichiometric YbH_{3} has not been obtained even at high pressure. Ytterbium also forms divalent and trivalent coordination and organometallic compounds, including reducing reagents such as YbI_{2} and divalent ytterbocenes.

Several ytterbium compounds have important physical or technological properties. YbB_{12} is a Kondo insulator with unusual metallic surface states, while intermetallic compounds such as YbRh_{2}Si_{2}, YbBiPt and YbInCu_{4} exhibit heavy-fermion, quantum-critical or valence-transition behaviour. Yb^{3+} is widely used as a dopant in solid-state and fiber laser materials, particularly in ytterbium-doped silica and Yb:YAG, and as a sensitizer in upconversion materials. Ytterbium(III) fluoride is used as a radiopaque filler in dental materials, while ytterbium halides such as YbI_{2} and YbCl_{3} are used as reducing agents and Lewis-acid catalysts in organic synthesis.

== Properties of ytterbium compounds ==
Selected crystallographic and physical properties of ytterbium compounds are listed below. Lattice parameters refer to the reported crystalline modification and are given in nanometres.

| Formula | Appearance | Crystal system | Space group | No. | a (nm) | b (nm) | c (nm) | Density (g/cm^{3}) | Ref. |
|---|---|---|---|---|---|---|---|---|---|
| Yb_{2}O_{3} | White | Cubic | Ia3̅ | 206 | 1.043 | — | — | 9.17 | |
| YbF_{2} | Transparent yellow | Cubic | Fm3̅m | 225 | 0.5598 | — | — | — | |
| YbCl_{3} | — | Monoclinic | C2/m | 12 | 0.6729 | 1.1614 | 0.6312 | — | |
| YbB_{6} | — | Cubic | Pm3̅m | 221 | 0.4144 | — | — | 5.45 | |
| YbB_{12} | Black | Cubic | Fm3̅m | 225 | 0.7460 | — | — | 4.84 | |
| YbPO_{4} | — | Tetragonal | I4_{1}/amd | 141 | 0.694 | — | 0.606 | — | |
| YbS | Black | Cubic | Fm3̅m | 225 | 0.5693 | — | — | 6.68 | |
| YbBr_{3} | — | Trigonal | R3̅ | 148 | 0.69718 | — | 1.91037 | — | |
| YbH_{2} | — | Orthorhombic | Pnma | 62 | 0.5900 | 0.3576 | 0.6776 | — | |
| YbC_{2} | — | Tetragonal | I4/mmm | 139 | 0.3639 | — | 0.6110 | — | |
| Yb_{5}Si_{4} | Grey | Orthorhombic | Pnma | 62 | 0.72633 | 1.47806 | 0.77034 | 7.851 | |
| YbP | — | Cubic | Fm3̅m | 225 | 0.5542 | — | — | — | |
| YbAl_{3} | — | Cubic | Pm3̅m | 221 | 0.4213 | — | — | — | |
| YbRh_{2}Si_{2} | — | Tetragonal | I4/mmm | 139 | 0.4007 | — | 0.9858 | — | |

== Halides ==
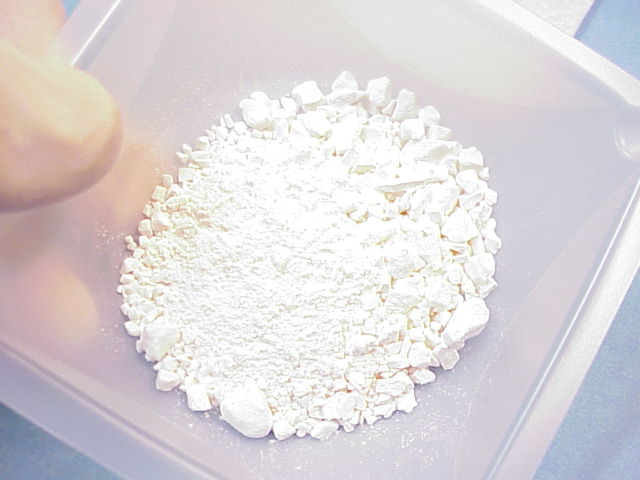
Ytterbium(III) chloride

Ytterbium forms halides in both the +2 and +3 oxidation states. The four trihalides YbF_{3}, YbCl_{3}, YbBr_{3} and YbI_{3} contain Yb^{3+}, whereas the corresponding dihalides contain genuine Yb^{2+} ions with the closed-shell 4f^{14} electronic configuration. This comparatively stable divalent state places ytterbium alongside europium and samarium among the lanthanides for which a complete series of conventional ionic dihalides is accessible.

The dihalides are reducing compounds and are readily oxidized to the corresponding trihalides. They can also disproportionate at elevated temperatures:

3 YbX_{2} → 2 YbX_{3} + Yb

where X is F, Cl, Br or I. Reduction of the heavier trihalides with ytterbium or other reducing metals provides convenient routes to the lower halides. For example, YbBr_{2} can be prepared by reducing YbBr_{3} with elemental ytterbium, whereas pure YbCl_{2} has been prepared by reacting ytterbium metal with ZnCl_{2} followed by removal of zinc-containing impurities.

Ytterbium(II) fluoride, YbF_{2}, crystallizes in the cubic fluorite structure, space group Fm3̅m, analogous to the fluorides of alkaline-earth metals. Single-crystal studies of slightly non-stoichiometric YbF^{+}_{2}x confirm the fluorite framework and show that the divalent fluoride can accommodate limited oxidation of Yb^{2+} to Yb^{3+} accompanied by additional fluoride ions. YbBr_{2} adopts an orthorhombic structure related to the SrI_{2} type at ambient conditions, and YbCl_{2} and YbBr_{2} form a continuous series of mixed crystals retaining this basic structural arrangement.

Ytterbium(II) iodide, YbI_{2}, is particularly important as a soluble reducing reagent. It can be prepared under anhydrous conditions by reaction of ytterbium metal with 1,2-diiodoethane in tetrahydrofuran, and solutions of YbI_{2} reduce a range of organic functional groups and promote coupling reactions of allylic and benzylic halides. Solid YbI_{2} is polymorphic; layered structures related to the CdI_{2} type are known, while a cubic modification has also been reported.

The trihalides show the structural changes characteristic of the late lanthanides. YbF_{3} crystallizes in the orthorhombic YF_{3}-type structure. Ytterbium(III) chloride, YbCl_{3}, has a layered monoclinic structure, space group C2/m, in which Yb^{3+} ions are octahedrally coordinated by chloride and form nearly regular two-dimensional honeycomb layers.

The heavier trihalides YbBr_{3} and YbI_{3} instead adopt the layered BiI_{3} structure type, with rhombohedral space group R3̅. In both compounds, edge-sharing YbX_{6} octahedra generate two-dimensional honeycomb nets of Yb^{3+} ions. Their weakly connected halide layers have led to considerable study of YbCl_{3}, YbBr_{3} and YbI_{3} as low-dimensional magnetic materials.

Several ytterbium halides are also useful synthetic reagents. Ytterbium(III) chloride is a Lewis acid and has been used in catalytic carbon–carbon bond-forming reactions, including decarboxylative aldol reactions and the allylation of aldehydes with allyltrimethylsilane.

== Chalcogenides ==
=== Oxides ===
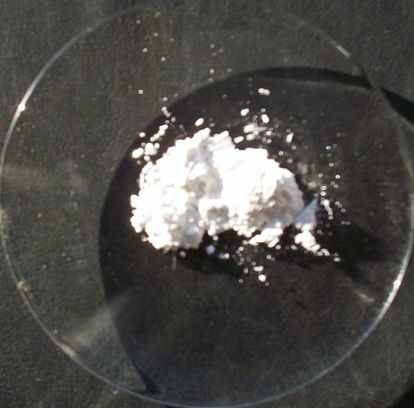
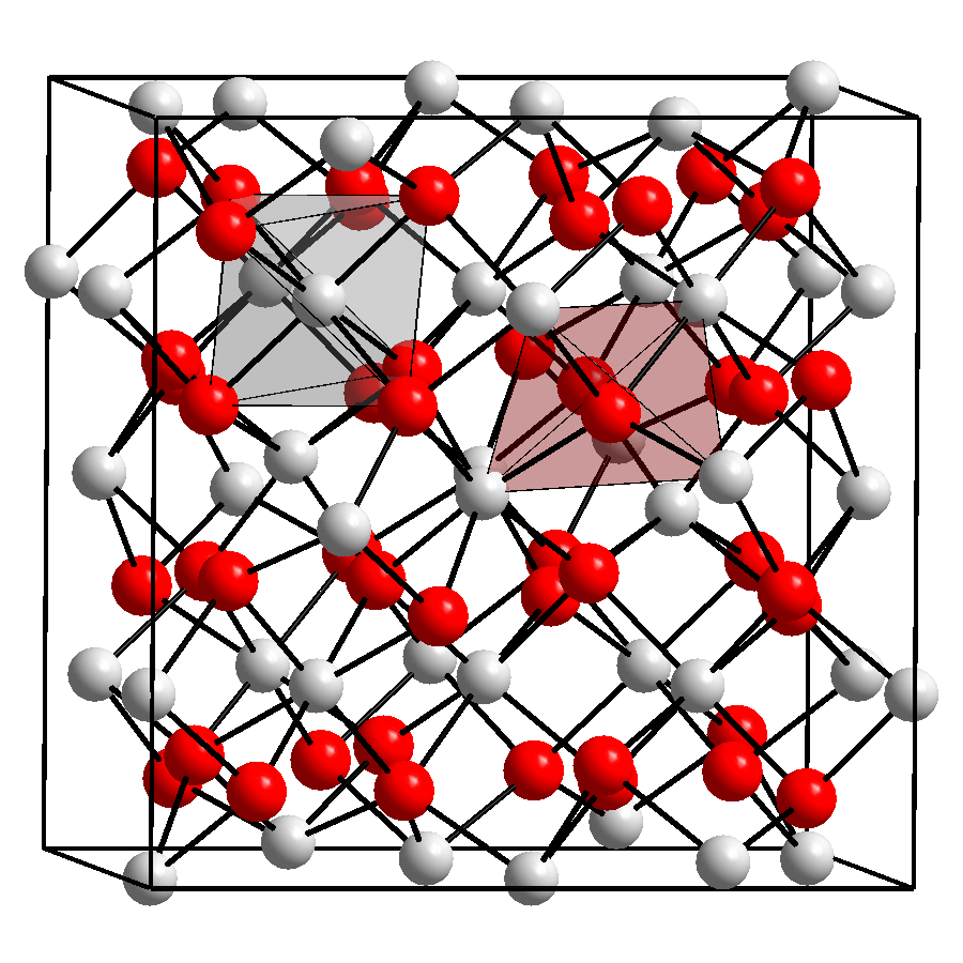
Ytterbium(III) oxide and its crystal structure.

The principal oxide of ytterbium is ytterbium(III) oxide, Yb_{2}O_{3}, in which ytterbium is trivalent. At room temperature it crystallizes in the cubic C-type rare-earth sesquioxide structure (bixbyite type), space group Ia3̅. The structure can be regarded as an ordered-defect derivative of the fluorite structure, with one quarter of the anion sites vacant; the ytterbium atoms occupy two crystallographically distinct sites and are six-coordinate. High-temperature synchrotron diffraction shows that Yb_{2}O_{3} retains the cubic bixbyite structure up to its melting point, without the high-temperature structural transitions observed for some of the lighter lanthanide sesquioxides.

Ytterbium also forms the divalent monoxide ytterbium(II) oxide, YbO. It adopts the cubic rock salt structure, in contrast to the trivalent sesquioxide, and can be obtained by reduction of Yb_{2}O_{3} with ytterbium metal. YbO is considerably less stable than Yb_{2}O_{3} and is readily oxidized; thin films of the metastable monoxide have also been prepared by molecular-beam deposition under ytterbium-rich conditions.

=== Other chalcogenides ===
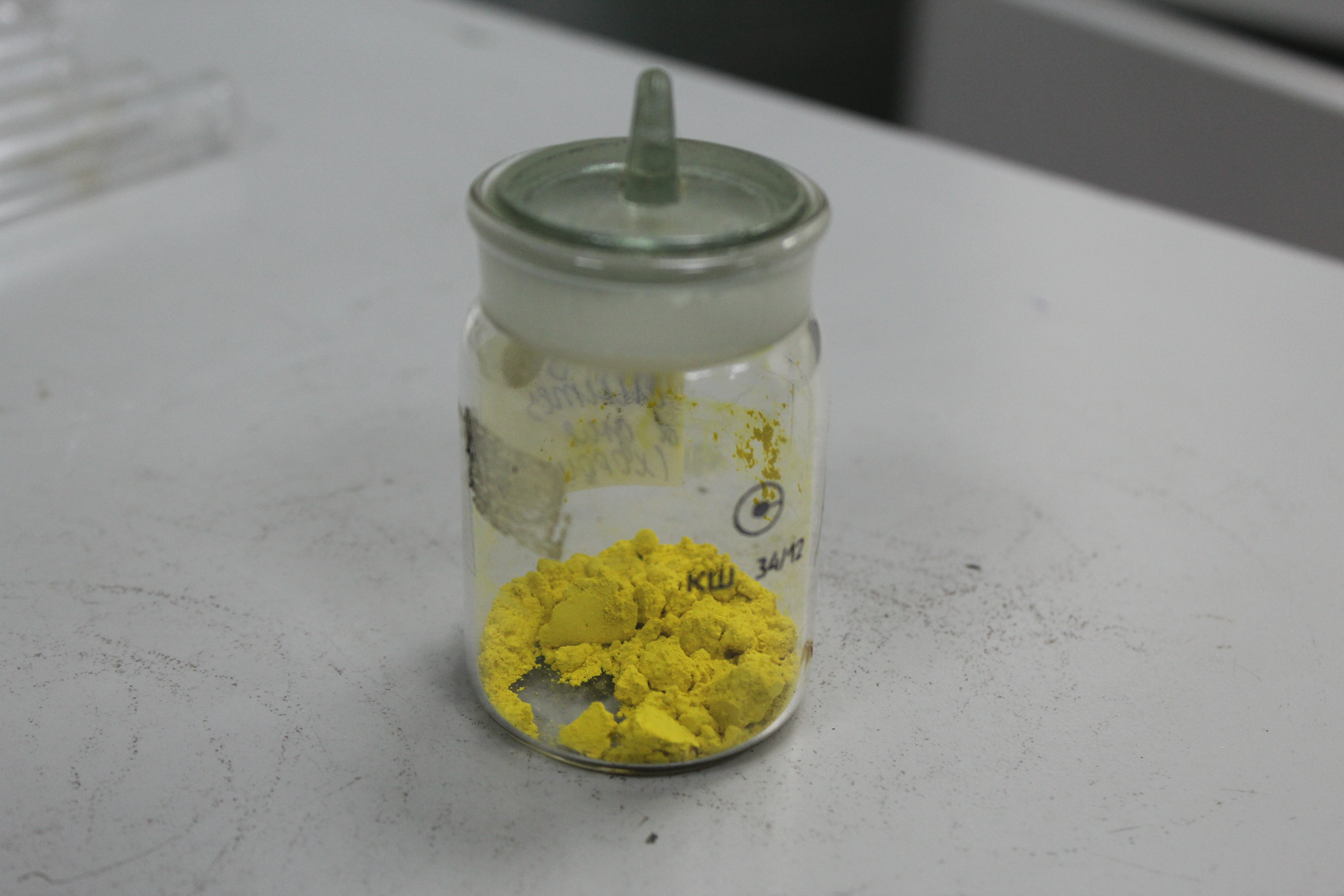
Ytterbium(III) sulfide

Ytterbium forms binary sulfides, selenides and tellurides in both divalent and trivalent compositions. The monochalcogenides YbS, YbSe and YbTe contain predominantly Yb^{2+} with its filled 4f^{14} shell and adopt the cubic rock salt structure at ambient pressure. Their divalent character distinguishes them from most corresponding late-lanthanide monochalcogenides, in which the metal is normally trivalent.

Ytterbium(II) sulfide, YbS, is a black semiconducting solid. In addition to YbS, the ytterbium–sulfur system contains several sulfur-richer phases, including Yb_{2}S_{3} and Yb_{3}S_{4}. Magnetic measurements indicate predominantly trivalent ytterbium in the sesquisulfide Yb_{2}S_{3}, whereas the monosulfide retains the characteristic divalent state. Ytterbium sesquisulfide is polymorphic. One crystalline modification, T-Yb_{2}S_{3}, has the cubic bixbyite-type structure, space group Ia3̅, with two crystallographically distinct Yb^{3+} sites in distorted octahedral sulfur environments.

The corresponding sesquiselenide, Yb_{2}Se_{3}, contains trivalent ytterbium and crystallizes in the orthorhombic space group Fddd, adopting the Sc_{2}S_{3} structure type. Its structure is an ordered-defect derivative of the rock salt structure and consists of edge-sharing, slightly distorted YbSe_{6} octahedra.

The electronic properties of the divalent monochalcogenides are strongly pressure-dependent. High-pressure X-ray diffraction of YbS and YbSe showed anomalous compression associated with a continuous increase of the ytterbium valence from Yb^{2+} toward Yb^{3+}. YbTe similarly undergoes a pressure-induced electronic transition associated with transfer of an ytterbium 4f electron into the conduction states.

== Hydrides ==
Ytterbium forms binary hydrides over a relatively narrow composition range compared with most of the lanthanides. This behaviour arises from the unusual stability of divalent ytterbium with its filled 4f^{14} shell. Whereas most lanthanides readily absorb sufficient hydrogen to form trihydrides, further oxidation of Yb^{2+} toward Yb^{3+} is considerably less favourable.

The hydrogen-poor compound is ytterbium dihydride, YbH_{2}, in which ytterbium is predominantly divalent. Unlike the fluorite-type dihydrides formed by most trivalent lanthanides, YbH_{2} adopts an orthorhombic CaH_{2}-type structure at ambient pressure. High-pressure diffraction studies show that it undergoes a structural transition at about 16 GPa to a phase in which the ytterbium atoms form a hexagonal close-packed arrangement.

Higher hydrogen contents can be obtained under increased hydrogen pressure and temperature. The best-characterized higher hydride has composition YbH_{2.67}, equivalently Yb_{3}H_{8}. Its composition can be represented formally as Yb(II)(Yb(III)H_{4})_{2}, indicating the presence of both divalent and trivalent ytterbium. Yb_{3}H_{8} crystallizes at lower pressure in the trigonal space group P3̅1m. The ytterbium atoms form a close-packed arrangement, while hydrogen occupies all tetrahedral interstices and two-thirds of the octahedral interstices.

Compression causes further structural changes without producing a conventional stoichiometric trihydride. The trigonal higher-hydride phase transforms between approximately 13 and 18 GPa to a tetragonal I4/m phase and, above about 27 GPa, to a higher-symmetry I4/mmm structure. Experiments in hydrogen, helium and neon pressure media showed broadly similar phase sequences, although samples compressed in hydrogen had slightly larger unit-cell volumes, consistent with limited additional hydrogen uptake.

Even under hydrogen pressures approaching 75 GPa, complete conversion to YbH_{3} was not observed, and no ytterbium polyhydride was detected. The highest compositions remained close to YbH_{2.67}, although slightly hydrogen-richer phases may occur under some conditions. The mixed-valent higher hydride remains semiconducting above 50 GPa, but its activation energy for electrical conduction decreases strongly with pressure, indicating that metallization may occur at still greater compression.

== Borides ==
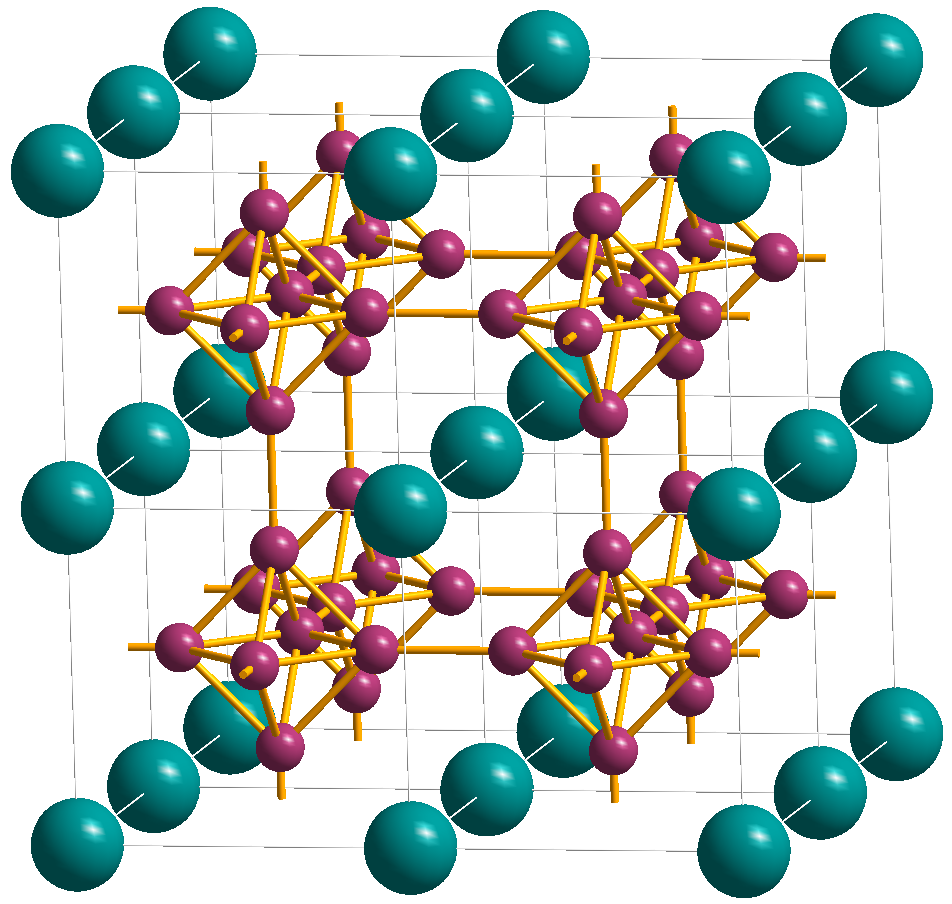
CaB_{6}-type crystal structure adopted by YbB_{6}

Ytterbium forms several binary borides with extended covalently bonded boron frameworks. As in other rare-earth borides, the structure changes substantially with increasing boron content. Particularly well-studied ytterbium borides include YbB_{4}, YbB_{6} and YbB_{12}, several of which exhibit intermediate-valence or strongly correlated electronic behaviour.

Ytterbium tetraboride, YbB_{4}, crystallizes in the tetragonal ThB_{4} structure type, space group P4/mbm. Its structure contains B_{6} octahedra linked by additional boron atoms and gives a two-dimensional arrangement of ytterbium sites related to the Shastry–Sutherland lattice. Resonant X-ray emission measurements show that ytterbium is intermediate-valent rather than purely divalent or trivalent: its average valence increases from about +2.61 at 12 K to +2.67 at 300 K. This intermediate valence has been associated with strong hybridization between the ytterbium 4f states and conduction electrons and helps suppress long-range magnetic ordering.

YbB_{6} is a cubic rare-earth hexaboride with the CaB_{6} structure type, in which B_{6} octahedra form a three-dimensional boron framework surrounding ytterbium atoms. Its electronic structure has attracted interest because calculations and early angle-resolved photoemission measurements suggested a topologically non-trivial state. A 2015 ARPES study reported surface states interpreted as arising from inversion between ytterbium d and boron p bands. Subsequent ARPES measurements on the non-polar (110) surface, combined with density-functional and GW calculations, instead found a topologically trivial semiconductor gap of about 0.3 eV, and the proposed topological character of YbB_{6} therefore remains disputed.

Ytterbium dodecaboride, YbB_{12}, is the best-known ytterbium boride and is a Kondo insulator. It crystallizes in the cubic UB_{12} structure type, space group Fm3̅m. Strongly bonded B_{12} cuboctahedra form a face-centred cubic framework, with ytterbium atoms occupying the large interstitial sites between the boron clusters. Stable rare-earth dodecaborides occur principally for the smaller, heavier rare-earth metals; the comparatively small size of ytterbium therefore favours formation of the RB_{12} structure.

The insulating behaviour of YbB_{12} develops on cooling as hybridization between localized Yb 4f states and conduction electrons opens a narrow electronic gap. The compound nevertheless shows unusual low-temperature surface electronic behaviour. Angle-resolved photoemission spectroscopy of the (001) surface found a two-dimensional metallic surface state which undergoes temperature-dependent reconstruction as the Kondo hybridization develops; at 20 K this state remains metallic within the insulating bulk energy gap. YbB_{12} has consequently become an important model system for studying the relation between Kondo hybridization, intermediate valence and unconventional surface states in strongly correlated insulators.

== Carbides and silicides ==
Ytterbium forms several binary carbides, of which ytterbium dicarbide, YbC_{2}, is the best characterized. At room temperature YbC_{2} crystallizes in the tetragonal calcium carbide structure type, space group I4/mmm, with carbon atoms paired into C_{2} units. Unlike the dicarbides of most trivalent lanthanides, the electronic state of ytterbium in YbC_{2} is strongly influenced by the stability of Yb^{2+}. High-resolution X-ray absorption measurements indicate that tetragonal YbC_{2} is mixed-valent, with approximately three quarters of the ytterbium present in a trivalent configuration and an average valence near +2.7.

The ytterbium–carbon system also contains more metal-rich phases. Classical phase studies identified a monoclinic carbide of approximate composition YbC_{1.25+y} (0 < y < 0.16), together with carbon-poorer phases near YbC and Yb_{2}C compositions. The precise compositions and structures assigned to some of these intermediate carbides have varied between studies, whereas YbC_{2} is consistently established as the principal carbon-rich binary phase.

Ytterbium also forms numerous binary silicides. Experimental studies of the Yb–Si phase diagram identified Yb_{5}Si_{3}, Yb_{5}Si_{4}, YbSi, Yb_{3}Si_{4}, Yb_{3}Si_{5} and silicon-deficient phases conventionally written YbSi^{−}_{2}x. Yb_{5}Si_{3} adopts the hexagonal Mn_{5}Si_{3} structure type, YbSi the orthorhombic CrB type, and Yb_{3}Si_{5} the Th_{3}Pd_{5} structure type. Yb_{5}Si_{4} crystallizes in the orthorhombic Sm_{5}Ge_{4} structure type, space group Pnma. In Yb_{5}Si_{4}, each silicon atom forms a covalent Si–Si bond, with Si–Si distances of approximately 0.245–0.247 nm.

The silicon-rich region contains a defect disilicide with significant silicon vacancies. At lower temperature, the composition near 62.5 at.% silicon is represented by the line compound Yb_{3}Si_{5}. Above about 947 °C it transforms to a non-stoichiometric YbSi^{−}_{2}x phase with an AlB_{2}-derived structure and a narrow homogeneity range. Magnetic-susceptibility and electrical-resistivity measurements on single crystals show that Yb_{3}Si_{5} is an intermediate-valence compound, reflecting the tendency of ytterbium to fluctuate between divalent and trivalent electronic configurations.

== Pnictides ==
Ytterbium forms several binary pnictides, including the monopnictides YbN, YbP, YbAs and YbSb. These compounds crystallize in the cubic rock salt structure, space group Fm3̅m, under ambient conditions. In contrast to the divalent ytterbium monochalcogenides, the monopnictides contain predominantly trivalent ytterbium, although the tendency toward divalency increases as the pnictogen becomes heavier. Electronic-structure calculations similarly find a progressive decrease in the effective ytterbium valence from YbN through YbP and YbAs to YbSb. A corresponding rock-salt YbBi phase has not been experimentally established.

Ytterbium nitride, YbN, contains trivalent ytterbium and adopts the rock-salt structure. Nanocrystalline YbN can be prepared by thermal decomposition of ytterbium amides. Both Yb(NH_{2})_{2} and Yb(NH_{2})_{3} first form imide intermediates on heating and subsequently yield stoichiometric cubic YbN at temperatures around 773 K. The nitride is sensitive to its environment; nanocrystalline samples readily absorb ammonia, accompanied by expansion of the crystal lattice.

Ytterbium phosphide, YbP, can be prepared through reaction of ytterbium dissolved in liquid ammonia with phosphine. An orange crystalline intermediate of approximate composition Yb(PH_{2})_{2}·5NH_{3} is first obtained; removal of ammonia gives ytterbium dihydrogenphosphide, which subsequently decomposes to YbP:

Yb(PH_{2})_{2}·5NH_{3} → Yb(PH_{2})_{2} + 5NH_{3}

2Yb(PH_{2})_{2} → 2YbP + 2PH_{3} + H_{2}

YbP is thermally stable for short periods at temperatures up to about 800 °C, but prolonged heating above approximately 550 °C causes phosphorus loss and formation of ytterbium sesquiphosphide, Yb_{3}P_{2}:

3YbP → Yb_{3}P_{2} + P

YbP, YbAs and YbSb are predominantly trivalent compounds and order antiferromagnetically only at very low temperatures. ^{170}Yb Mössbauer measurements have shown that all three retain the rock-salt structure while displaying unusually low magnetic ordering temperatures below 1 K, behaviour associated with competition between Kondo screening and magnetic exchange.

Ytterbium also forms pnictides of composition Yb_{4}Pn_{3} (Pn = P, As, Sb or Bi). Their high-temperature phases crystallize in the cubic anti-Th_{3}P_{4} structure type, space group I4̅3d. The ytterbium atoms form four sets of chains running along the body diagonals of the cubic cell. Formally, a trivalent pnictide anion gives an average ytterbium oxidation state of +2.25, and these compounds consequently provide important examples of mixed-valence ytterbium chemistry.

The best studied member is Yb_{4}As_{3}, a mixed-valent low-carrier compound. At room temperature it has the cubic anti-Th_{3}P_{4} structure and an average ytterbium valence close to +2.25. Near 290–300 K it undergoes a first-order transition to a slightly distorted trigonal structure, accompanied by ordering of the Yb^{2+} and Yb^{3+} states. Resonant X-ray diffraction directly demonstrated that the low-temperature phase contains one-dimensional charge ordering, with Yb^{3+} ions preferentially occupying chains along one of the original cubic body diagonals. These magnetic Yb^{3+} chains are responsible for much of the unusual low-temperature behaviour of Yb_{4}As_{3}, including its heavy-fermion characteristics despite an exceptionally small concentration of mobile charge carriers.

== Other inorganic compounds ==
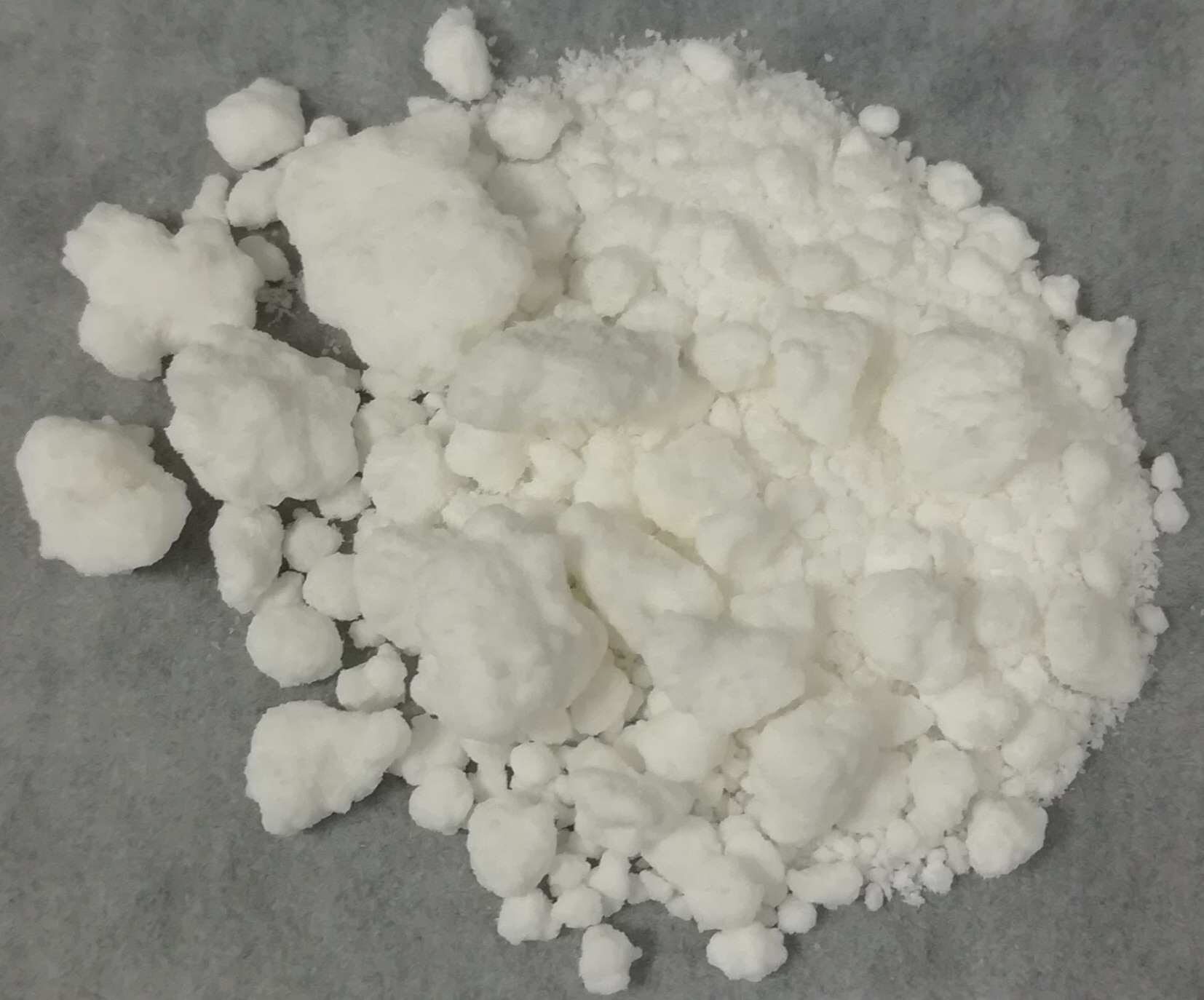
Ytterbium(III) acetate tetrahydrate

Ytterbium(III) nitrate, Yb(NO_{3})_{3}, is commonly obtained as hydrated, colorless crystals. Several hydrates are known, including the pentahydrate Yb(NO_{3})_{3}·5H_{2}O. Anhydrous ytterbium nitrate can be prepared by oxidation of ytterbium metal with dinitrogen tetroxide in an organic solvent such as ethyl acetate:

Yb + 3N_{2}O_{4} → Yb(NO_{3})_{3} + 3NO

Ytterbium(III) sulfate, Yb_{2}(SO_{4})_{3}, forms several hydrates. The trihydrate Yb_{2}(SO_{4})_{3}·3H_{2}O, obtained hydrothermally from Yb_{2}O_{3} and sulfuric acid, crystallizes in the orthorhombic space group Cmc2_{1} and is isostructural with the corresponding lutetium compound. Its three-dimensional framework contains YbO_{6}, YbO_{8} and YbO_{5}(H_{2}O)_{3} coordination polyhedra linked by sulfate tetrahedra. Heating the trihydrate between approximately 120 and 190 °C produces β-Yb_{2}(SO_{4})_{3}, which crystallizes in the trigonal space group R3c and has a three-dimensional sulfate framework. The octahydrate Yb_{2}(SO_{4})_{3}·8H_{2}O is also known and belongs to the common rare-earth sulfate octahydrate structure type.

Ytterbium(III) oxalate occurs as hydrated Yb_{2}(C_{2}O_{4})_{3}·xH_{2}O and is sparingly soluble in water. Its solubility depends on oxalate concentration and ionic strength; at sufficiently high concentrations of sodium and oxalate, it can be converted into a sodium ytterbium double oxalate of approximate composition NaYb(C_{2}O_{4})_{2}·yH_{2}O. The thermal decomposition of ytterbium oxalate is unusually sensitive to the surrounding atmosphere. Heating in vacuum causes partial reduction of Yb^{3+} to Yb^{2+}, an effect attributed to carbon monoxide formed during decomposition, whereas decomposition under oxidizing conditions ultimately gives Yb_{2}O_{3}.

Ytterbium orthophosphate, YbPO_{4}, crystallizes at ambient pressure in the tetragonal xenotime structure type, space group I4_{1}/amd. The structure consists of isolated PO_{4} tetrahedra linked to eight-coordinate Yb^{3+} ions. Under pressure, YbPO_{4} undergoes a reversible transformation near 22 GPa from the zircon-type structure to a denser tetragonal scheelite-type structure, accompanied by a volume decrease of approximately 10%.

Basic ytterbium carbonates can be obtained by precipitation from aqueous Yb^{3+} solutions. Reaction using ammonium bicarbonate has produced a crystalline hydrated basic carbonate of approximate composition Yb_{2}O_{3}·2.17CO_{2}·6.17H_{2}O. Infrared spectroscopy indicates the presence of two distinct carbonate environments, and thermal decomposition proceeds without formation of a stable intermediate carbonate phase.

Ytterbium(III) acetate forms hydrated salts, including the tetrahydrate Yb(CH_{3}COO)_{3}·4H_{2}O. The acetate is also a convenient precursor to basic ytterbium compounds. Hydrothermal treatment of hydrated ytterbium acetate with sodium hydroxide at 443 K produces the basic acetate [Yb(CH_{3}COO)(OH)_{2}]·0.5H_{2}O. Its crystal structure consists of two-dimensional layers containing six crystallographically distinct Yb^{3+} sites with coordination numbers of seven or eight; the ytterbium polyhedra are connected mainly through bridging hydroxide groups.

== Coordination compounds ==
Structure of the ytterbium(III) acetylacetonate complex [Yb(acac)_{3}(H_{2}O)_{2}]

Ytterbium(III) forms numerous coordination complexes with oxygen- and nitrogen-donor ligands. As a relatively small trivalent lanthanide ion, Yb^{3+} generally has lower coordination numbers than the early lanthanides, with eight- and nine-coordinate environments being particularly common. Bonding remains predominantly ionic, and the coordination geometry is strongly influenced by ligand denticity and solvent. Spectroscopic and computational studies indicate that the ytterbium(III) solvates in water, methanol and N,N-dimethylformamide are eight-coordinate and have approximately square-antiprismatic coordination geometries, whereas speciation in dimethyl sulfoxide is more complex.

Chelating ligands can produce higher coordination numbers. In the tris(dipicolinate) complex [Yb(DPA)_{3}]^{3−} (DPA = pyridine-2,6-dicarboxylate), three tridentate ligands give a nine-coordinate YbN_{3}O_{6} environment with a distorted tricapped trigonal-prismatic geometry. The crystal-field splitting and magnetic anisotropy of Yb^{3+} are highly sensitive to small changes in this coordination geometry. Ytterbium(III) complexes are also notable for near-infrared luminescence arising from the ^{2}F_{5/2} → ^{2}F_{7/2} transition of the 4f^{13} ion.

Nitrate complexes illustrate the effect of the lanthanide contraction on coordination number. In complexes of Yb^{3+} with 2,2′:6′,2″-terpyridine, the metal can be nine-coordinate; for example, [Yb(NO_{3})_{2}(terpy)(H_{2}O)_{2}]^{+} contains a tridentate terpyridine ligand, two bidentate nitrate ions and two water molecules around ytterbium. Closely related neutral complexes [Yb(terpy)(NO_{3})_{3}] also undergo selective solvolysis of one nitrate group, demonstrating the sensitivity of heavy-lanthanide coordination spheres to solvent and ligand arrangement.

== Organoytterbium compounds ==
Structural formula of tris(trimethylsilylmethyl)ytterbium, an organoytterbium compound

Organoytterbium compounds contain ytterbium–carbon interactions and are known in both the +2 and +3 oxidation states. Ytterbium is particularly important in divalent organolanthanide chemistry because Yb^{2+} has the closed-shell 4f^{14} configuration and is substantially more accessible than the +2 state of most lanthanides. Cyclopentadienyl and substituted cyclopentadienyl ligands dominate this chemistry because they stabilize both oxidation states while leaving the metal centre available for ligand binding and redox reactions.

=== Cyclopentadienyl compounds ===
Trivalent tris(cyclopentadienyl)ytterbium, Yb(C_{5}H_{5})_{3}, is one of the simplest organoytterbium(III) compounds. In the crystalline solid it forms a polymeric arrangement in which two cyclopentadienyl ligands are η^{5}-bound to each ytterbium centre while another cyclopentadienyl group bridges neighbouring ytterbium atoms through η^{5} and η^{1} interactions. In isolated molecules at low temperature, all three cyclopentadienyl rings can instead bind in an η^{5} fashion.

Divalent ytterbocenes contain two cyclopentadienyl-type ligands and Yb^{2+}. A particularly important example is bis(pentamethylcyclopentadienyl)ytterbium(II), Yb(C_{5}Me_{5})_{2}, commonly written Cp·2Yb. Base-free Cp·2Yb has a bent metallocene structure rather than the parallel-ring geometry of ferrocene; crystallographic studies give centroid–Yb–centroid angles of approximately 145–146°. Related substituted ytterbocenes are conveniently prepared by metathesis of YbI_{2} with alkali-metal cyclopentadienides.

=== Reactivity of divalent ytterbocenes ===
Divalent ytterbocenes show both Lewis acid and single-electron-transfer chemistry. Coordination of a neutral donor can leave ytterbium in the +2 oxidation state, whereas reaction with readily reducible substrates can transfer an electron from Yb^{2+} and produce an organoytterbium(III) product. This combination of closed-shell Yb^{2+} stability and accessible oxidation to Yb^{3+} gives the compounds reactivity that differs markedly from that of ordinary trivalent organolanthanides.

Cp·2Yb and related ytterbocenes reversibly bind carbon monoxide at room temperature and also form isolable complexes with isocyanide ligands. Spectroscopic measurements show that the electronic interaction depends strongly on the substituents of the cyclopentadienyl rings; in several Yb^{2+} complexes the ytterbocene fragment acts as a net π donor toward coordinated carbon monoxide. Divalent ytterbocenes can also coordinate transition-metal carbonyl fragments, producing heterobimetallic compounds in which the ytterbium centre participates through both Lewis-acid interactions and electron transfer.

== Alloys and intermetallic compounds ==
Ytterbium forms a large number of binary and ternary intermetallic compounds. Their structures and physical properties are strongly influenced by the ytterbium valence. Compounds containing Yb^{2+}, with its closed 4f^{14} shell, are generally nonmagnetic and often show structural similarities to corresponding calcium compounds, whereas Yb^{3+} has the magnetic 4f^{13} configuration. Intermediate and fluctuating valence states between these limits are also common and give rise to Kondo, heavy fermion and other strongly correlated electronic behaviour.

=== Ytterbium aluminides ===
Among the best-studied binary intermetallics are YbAl_{2} and YbAl_{3}. YbAl_{2} crystallizes in the cubic Laves phase MgCu_{2} structure type, space group Fd3̅m, whereas YbAl_{3} adopts the cubic Cu_{3}Au structure type, space group Pm3̅m. Both exhibit intermediate ytterbium valence rather than a simple integral +2 or +3 state.

YbAl_{3} is a prototypical mixed-valence Kondo-lattice compound. Its average ytterbium valence changes with temperature as the Yb 4f states hybridize with conduction electrons. On cooling below approximately 35–40 K it develops a heavy Fermi liquid state; angle-resolved photoemission experiments show that the accompanying valence change alters the Fermi-surface topology and produces a Lifshitz transition.

=== Ytterbium dirhodium disilicide ===
The ThCr_{2}Si_{2}-type crystal structure adopted by YbRh_{2}Si_{2}

YbRh_{2}Si_{2} is one of the most extensively studied ytterbium-based heavy fermion compounds. It crystallizes in the tetragonal ThCr_{2}Si_{2} structure type, space group I4/mmm, and contains predominantly trivalent ytterbium. It undergoes antiferromagnetic ordering at approximately 70 mK. The order can be suppressed by a small applied magnetic field, producing a field-tuned quantum critical point and pronounced non-Fermi-liquid behaviour.

At still lower temperature, YbRh_{2}Si_{2} becomes superconducting. Magnetic and calorimetric measurements extending to approximately 1 mK found the development of nuclear antiferromagnetic order slightly above 2 mK together with heavy-electron superconductivity at a similar temperature.

=== Ytterbium bismuth platinum ===
Ytterbium bismuth platinum, YbBiPt (also written YbPtBi), is a ternary heavy-fermion compound. It crystallizes in the non-centrosymmetric cubic half-Heusler MgAgAs structure type, space group F4̅3m, with the ytterbium atoms forming a face-centred cubic sublattice.

YbBiPt has an exceptionally large low-temperature electronic specific-heat coefficient, characteristic of a very large quasiparticle effective mass. It develops short-range antiferromagnetic correlations below about 0.7 K and fragile long-range antiferromagnetic order below approximately 0.4 K, while its Kondo temperature is only about 1 K. High-resolution diffraction shows that the cubic structure persists to at least 1.5 K, despite the development of these low-temperature electronic states.

=== Ytterbium indium copper ===
YbInCu_{4} is notable for an abrupt first-order valence transition near 42 K. Above the transition ytterbium is close to trivalent and behaves as a local-moment system, whereas below it the compound enters an intermediate-valence state. Hard X-ray photoelectron spectroscopy gives an average ytterbium valence of approximately +2.90 above the transition and +2.74 below it. The transition is essentially isostructural and provides a particularly clear example of the competition between localized trivalent ytterbium and an itinerant intermediate-valence state in an intermetallic compound.

=== Ytterbium gallium germanium ===
YbGaGe crystallizes in a hexagonal structure, space group P6_{3}/mmc, containing alternating ytterbium layers and puckered gallium–germanium layers. It attracted considerable attention after an initial study reported almost zero thermal expansion over a wide temperature range and attributed the effect to a change in the ytterbium valence.

The reported zero expansion was not reproduced in subsequent measurements of well-characterized stoichiometric samples, which instead showed ordinary positive thermal expansion comparable to that of common metals. Small additions of carbon or boron strongly modify the expansion behaviour, suggesting that the anomalous results are sensitive to composition and substitutional disorder rather than arising from an intrinsic valence transition.

== Applications ==
Luminescence from NaYF_{4} nanoparticles co-doped with Yb^{3+} and Er^{3+} under infrared excitation

Ytterbium compounds are widely used as sources of Yb^{3+} in optical materials. Yb^{3+} has a comparatively simple electronic structure, with only the ^{2}F_{7/2} ground-state and ^{2}F_{5/2} excited-state manifolds involved in near-infrared laser operation. The absence of low-lying excited states suppresses processes such as excited-state absorption and upconversion losses, while the relatively small energy difference between pump and laser photons reduces heat generation. These properties make ytterbium-doped materials particularly suitable for diode-pumped high-power and ultrafast lasers.

Ytterbium-doped optical fibers are important gain media for fiber lasers and amplifiers operating principally around 1.0–1.1 μm. Yb^{3+}-doped silica has broad absorption and emission bands, allowing efficient pumping by high-power semiconductor laser diodes and operation over a range of wavelengths. Cladding-pumped ytterbium fibre lasers combine efficient conversion of pump radiation with good beam quality and effective removal of heat, and have consequently become particularly important for high-power continuous-wave and pulsed laser systems. Crystalline laser hosts are also commonly doped with Yb^{3+}. In particular, ytterbium-doped yttrium aluminium garnet (Yb:YAG) combines the favourable optical properties of Yb^{3+} with the mechanical strength and thermal conductivity of the garnet host and is used in high-power solid-state and ultrafast lasers.

Yb^{3+} is also one of the most widely used sensitizer ions in upconversion materials. It absorbs efficiently near 980 nm and can transfer excitation energy to activator ions such as Er^{3+}, Tm^{3+} and Ho^{3+}, which subsequently emit higher-energy visible or near-infrared photons. Fluoride hosts such as NaYF_{4} co-doped with Yb^{3+} and Er^{3+} or Tm^{3+} are among the most extensively studied upconversion materials. Their near-infrared excitation and resistance to photobleaching have led to investigation of Yb-sensitized nanoparticles for optical sensing, biological imaging, bioassays and theranostic systems.

Ytterbium(III) fluoride, YbF_{3}, is used as a radiopaque filler in dental restorative materials and cements. The high atomic number of ytterbium increases absorption of X-rays, allowing restorations containing YbF_{3} to be distinguished radiographically from surrounding tooth structure. Experimental resin cements containing at least 30% YbF_{3} showed radiopacity comparable to 3 mm of aluminium without significant deterioration of the measured flexural strength or degree of polymerization. YbF_{3} has also been incorporated into composite resins as a sparingly soluble fluoride-containing filler, although such materials release considerably less fluoride than conventional glass-ionomer cements.

Several ytterbium halides are useful reagents in organic synthesis. Ytterbium(II) iodide, YbI_{2}, is a soluble single-electron reducing agent analogous to samarium(II) iodide and has been used for reductions and carbon–carbon coupling reactions. Ytterbium(III) chloride, YbCl_{3}, functions as a Lewis acid catalyst; for example, it catalyses the allylation of aromatic and aliphatic aldehydes with allyltrimethylsilane under mild conditions.

== Gallery ==
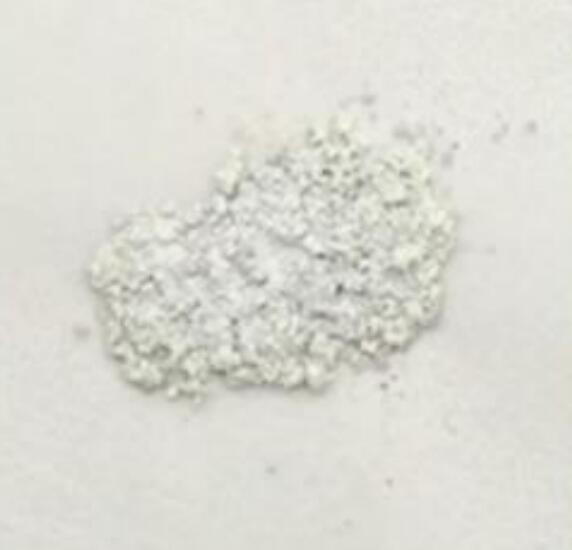
Ytterbium(II) chloride (YbCl_{2})

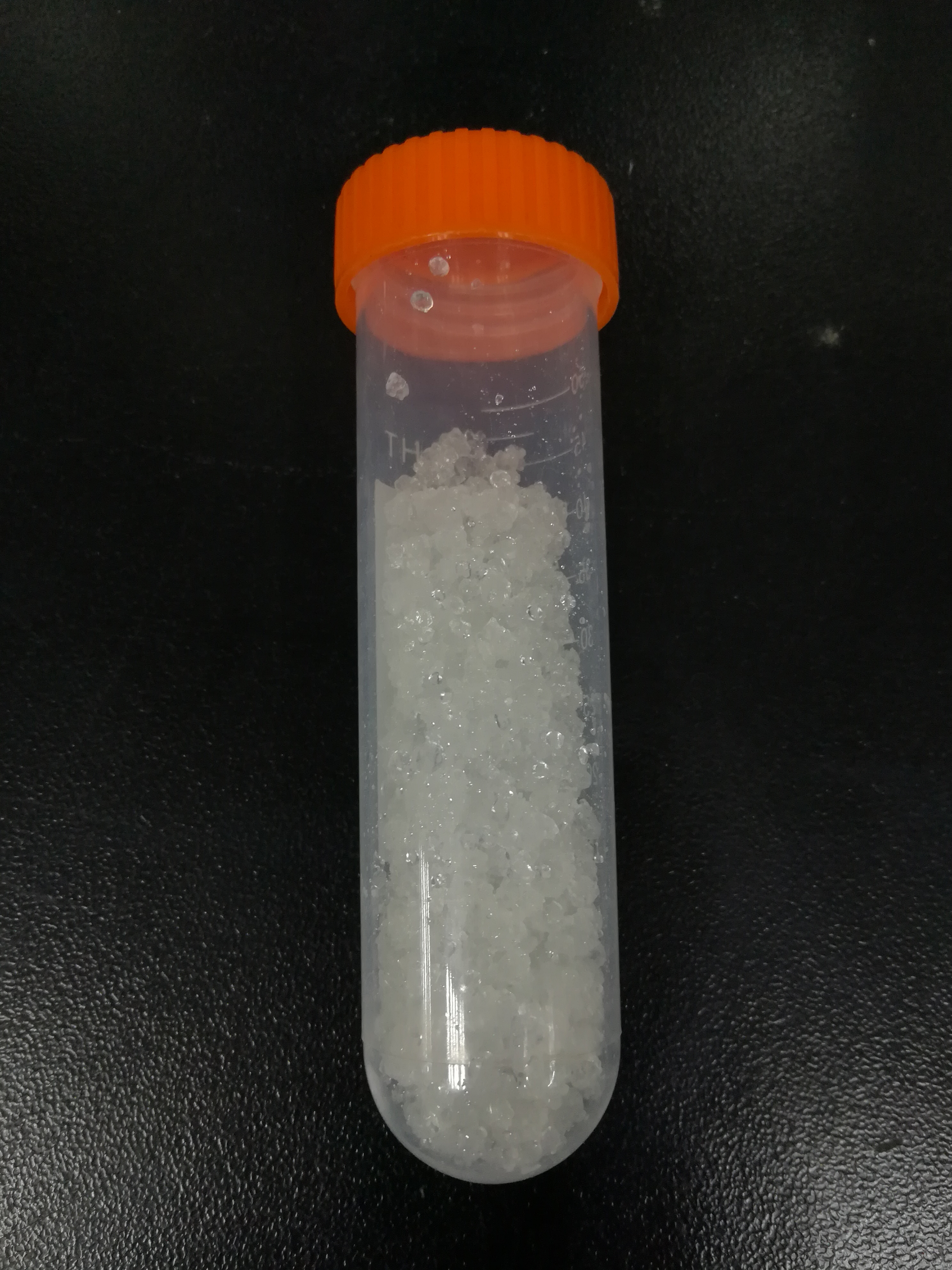
Ytterbium(III) nitrate (Yb(NO_{3})_{3})

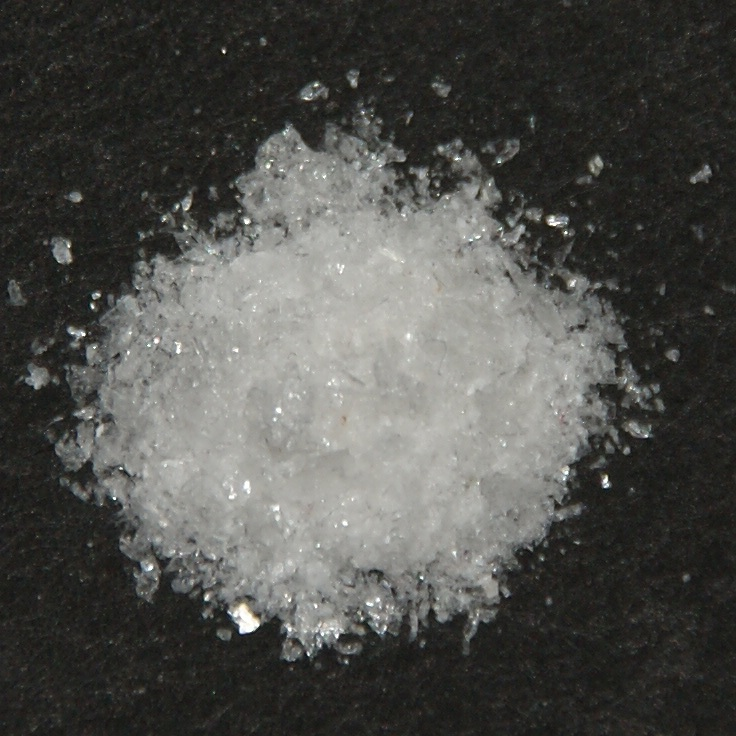
Ytterbium(III) acetate (Yb(CH_{3}COO)_{3})

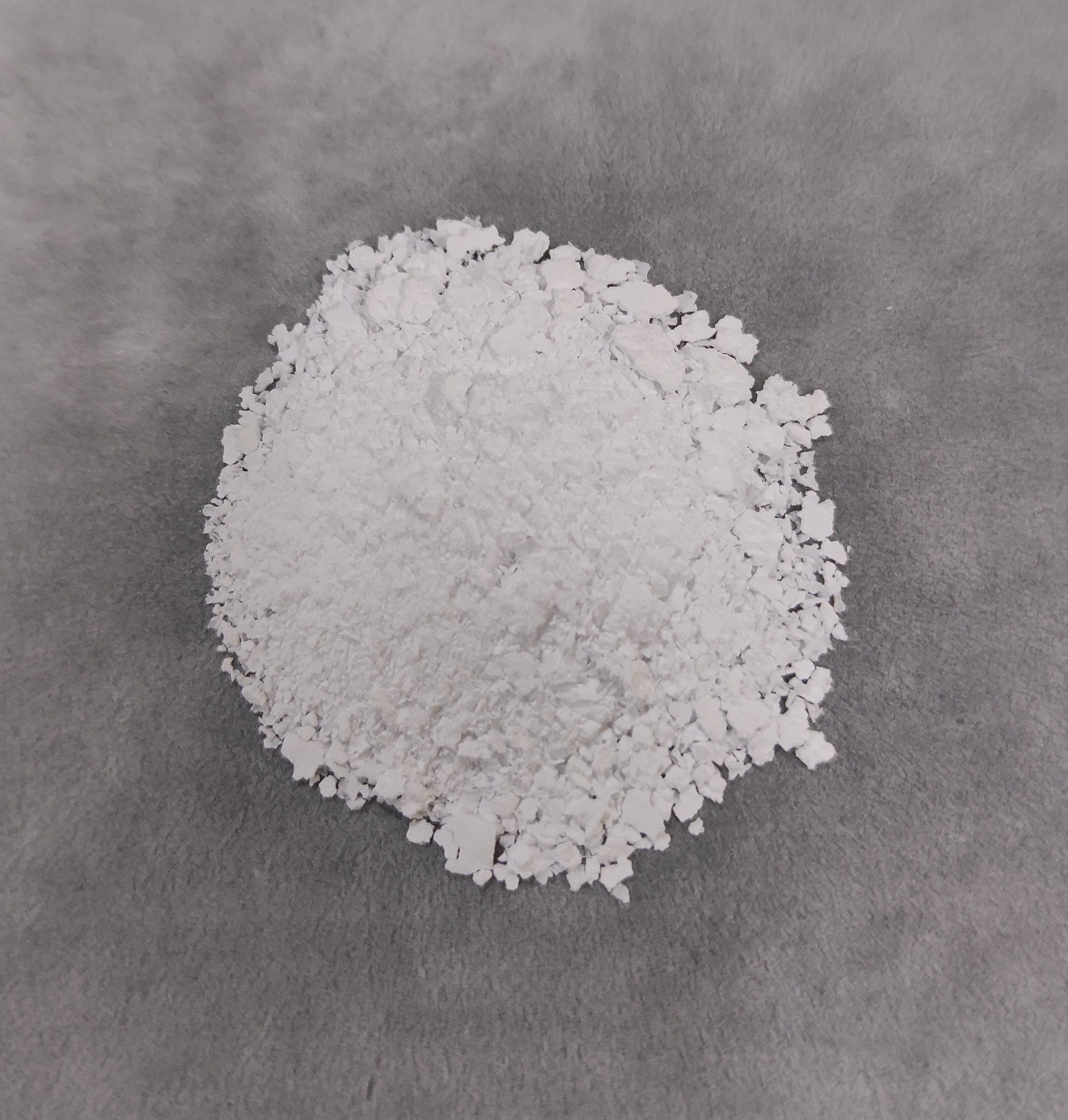
Ytterbium(III) hydroxide (Yb(OH)_{3})

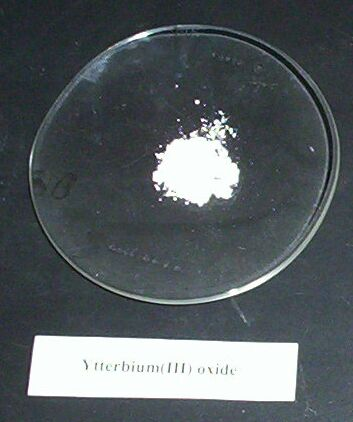
Ytterbium(III) oxide (Yb_{2}O_{3})

== See also ==
- Thulium compounds
- Lutetium compounds
