= Ytterbium iodide =

Ytterbium iodide may refer to:

- Ytterbium(II) iodide (ytterbium diiodide), YbI_{2}
- Ytterbium(III) iodide (ytterbium triiodide), YbI_{3}
