= Lutetium(III) acetate =

Compound of lutetium

Lutetium acetate
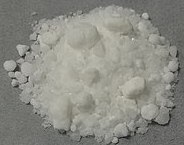
- Lutetium acetate Some white lutetium acetate powder.

Names
- IUPAC names Tetra-μ^{2}-acetatodiaquadilutetium(III) lutetium(3+);triacetate neodymium(3+) triacetate
- Other names: Lutetium ethanoate; Lutetium triacetate; Lutetium(III) acetate

Identifiers
CAS Number	18779-08-3
3D model (JSmol)	Interactive image
ChemSpider	146740
ECHA InfoCard	100.038.681
EC Number	242-566-3
PubChem CID	167747
CompTox Dashboard (EPA)	DTXSID00890781
- InChI: InChI=1S/C2H4O2.Lu/c1-2(3)4;/h1H3,(H,3,4); Key: WXHWNEZDKCJUFF-UHFFFAOYSA-N
- SMILES: CC(=O)[O-].CC(=O)[O-].CC(=O)[O-].[Lu+3]

Properties
Chemical formula	Lu(C_{2}H_{3}O_{2})_{3}

Hazards
- GHS labelling
Pictograms	(GHS07: Exclamation mark)
Signal word	Warning
Hazard statements	H315, H318, H335
Precautionary statements	P261, P264, P264+P265, P271, P280, P302+P352, P304+P340, P305+P351+P338, P319, P321, P337+P317, P362+P364, P403+P233, P405, P501

Related compounds
Other anions	Lutetium(III) oxide Lutetium(III) hydroxide Lutetium(III) carbonate
Other cations	Ytterbium(III) acetate Thulium(III) acetate
- Except where otherwise noted, data are given for materials in their standard state (at 25 °C [77 °F], 100 kPa). Infobox references

Lutetium(III) acetate is the acetate salt of lutetium with the chemical formula of Lu(CH_{3}COO)_{3}.

== Preparation ==
Lutetium(III) acetate can be prepared through neutralisation, where a lutetium salt reacts with acetic acid to produce lutetium acetate and water:

Lu_{2}O_{3} + 6 CH_{3}COOH → 2 Lu(CH_{3}COO)_{3} + 3 H_{2}O
Lu(OH)_{3} + 3 CH_{3}COOH → Lu(CH_{3}COO)_{3} + 3 H_{2}O

Lutetium(III) acetate also can be obtained by reacting lutetium oxide with gaseous acetic acid or 50% acetic acid solution.

== Properties ==
Lutetium(III) acetate is a water-soluble salt that forms colorless crystals. It forms crystalline hydrates in the form of Lu(CH_{3}COO)_{3}•nH_{2}O, where n = 1 or 4.

Lutetium(III) acetate reacts with ammonium fluoride to produce lutetium fluoride:

Lu(CH_{3}COO)_{3} + 3 NH_{4}F → LuF_{3} + 3 CH_{3}COONH_{4}

The F^{−} formed by the hydrolysis of fluoroborates (such as [BMIM]BF_{4}) can also precipitate with Lu^{3+}.

Reaction with phosphoric acid to produce lutetium phosphate:

Lu(CH_{3}COO)_{3} + H_{3}PO_{4} → LuPO_{4} + 3 CH_{3}COOH
