= Ytterbium(III) acetate =

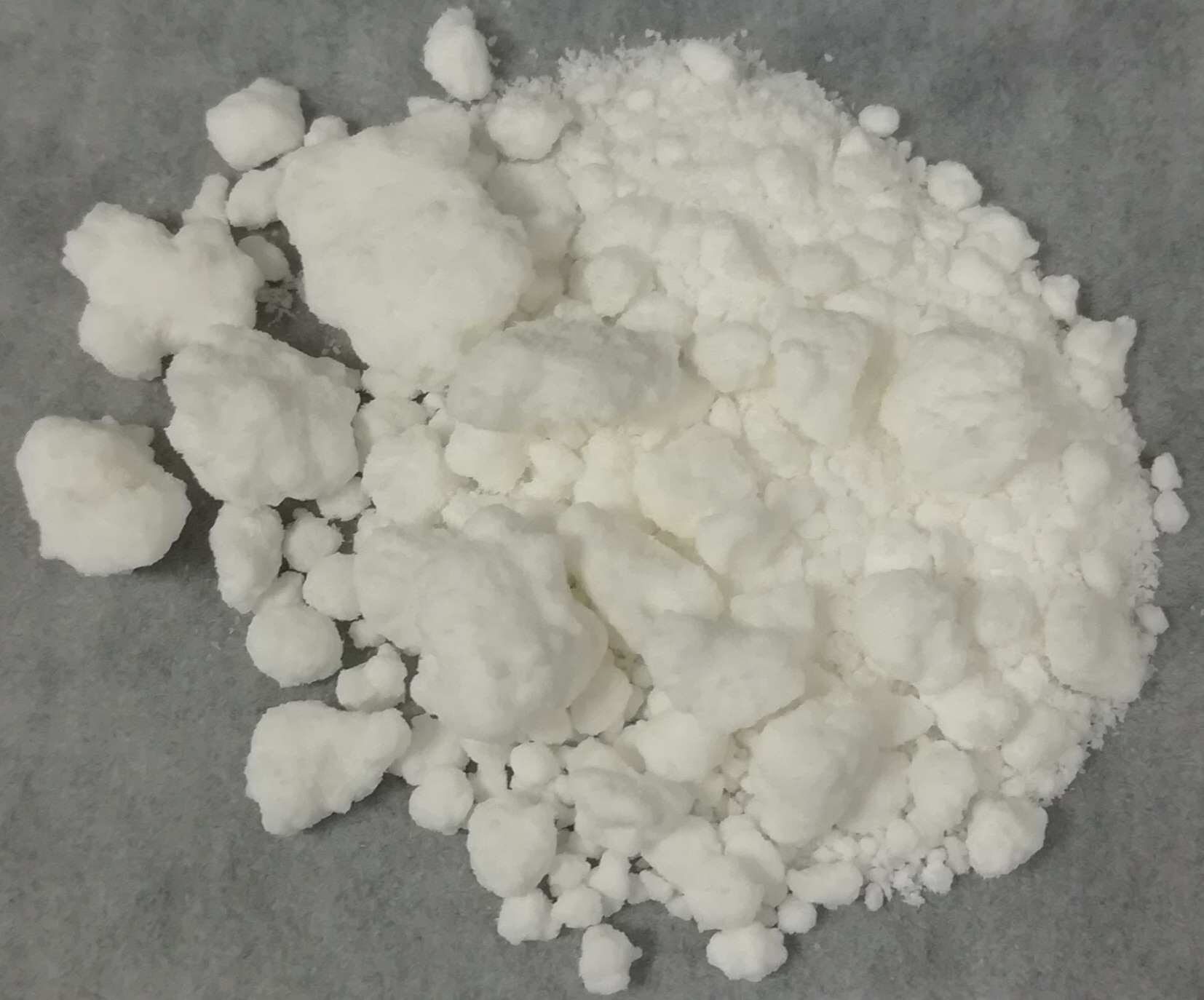

Names
- Other names: Ytterbium acetate; Ytterbium triacetate

Identifiers
CAS Number	20981-49-1
3D model (JSmol)	Interactive image
ChemSpider	146917
ECHA InfoCard	100.040.109
EC Number	244-137-6
PubChem CID	167952
CompTox Dashboard (EPA)	DTXSID90890790
- InChI: InChI=1S/3C2H4O2.Yb/c3*1-2(3)4;/h3*1H3,(H,3,4);/q;;;+3/p-3 Key: OSCVBYCJUSOYPN-UHFFFAOYSA-K
- SMILES: CC(=O)[O-].CC(=O)[O-].CC(=O)[O-].[Yb+3]

Properties
Chemical formula	Yb(CH_{3}COO)_{3}
Appearance	crystal
Solubility in water	soluble

Hazards
- GHS labelling
Pictograms	(GHS07: Exclamation mark)
Signal word	Warning
Hazard statements	H315, H319, H335
Precautionary statements	P261, P264, P264+P265, P271, P280, P302+P352, P304+P340, P305+P351+P338, P319, P321, P332+P317, P337+P317, P362+P364, P403+P233, P405, P501

Related compounds
Other anions	Ytterbium(III) oxide Ytterbium(III) hydroxide Ytterbium(III) carbonate
Other cations	Lutetium(III) acetate Thulium(III) acetate
- Except where otherwise noted, data are given for materials in their standard state (at 25 °C [77 °F], 100 kPa). Infobox references

Ytterbium(III) acetate is an inorganic salt of ytterbium and acetic acid, with a chemical formula of Yb(CH_{3}COO)_{3}. It has colorless crystals that are soluble in water and can form hydrates.

== Physical properties ==
Ytterbium can form crystals and it is easily soluble in water. Its hydrates are in the form of Yb(CH_{3}COO)_{3}·nH_{2}O where n= 1, 4, 6.

== Applications ==
Ytterbium acetate can be used as a raw material for the synthesis of upconversion luminescent materials；it can also be used as a catalyst for some specific organic reactions.
