= Ytterbium(III) phosphate =

Names
- Other names: Ytterbium phosphate; Ytterbium orthophosphate

Identifiers
CAS Number	13759-80-3
3D model (JSmol)	Interactive image
ChemSpider	9826626
ECHA InfoCard	100.033.937
EC Number	237-346-9
PubChem CID	11651888
CompTox Dashboard (EPA)	DTXSID60929844
- InChI: InChI=1S/H3O4P.Yb/c1-5(2,3)4;/h(H3,1,2,3,4);/q;+3/p-3 Key: YXNVQKRHARCEKL-UHFFFAOYSA-K
- SMILES: [O-]P(=O)([O-])[O-].[Yb+3]

Properties
Chemical formula	YbPO_{4}
Molar mass	268.02 g/mol
Appearance	Solid
Density	6.44 g/cm^{3}

Structure
Crystal structure	Tetragonal, xenotime type
Space group	I4_{1}/amd, No. 141
Lattice constant	a = 0.6816 nm, c = 0.5966 nm
Formula units (Z)	4
- Except where otherwise noted, data are given for materials in their standard state (at 25 °C [77 °F], 100 kPa). Infobox references

Ytterbium(III) phosphate is an inorganic compound of ytterbium and phosphate with the chemical formula YbPO_{4}. Hydrated forms are also known.

== Structure and properties ==
Anhydrous ytterbium(III) phosphate crystallizes in the tetragonal crystal system with the xenotime structure, in space group I4_{1}/amd (No. 141). The structure consists of isolated PO_{4} tetrahedra and eight-coordinate Yb^{3+} ions.

Representative room-temperature lattice parameters are a = 6.816 Å and c = 5.966 Å, with four formula units per unit cell. The calculated density is approximately 6.44 g/cm^{3}.

Hydrated ytterbium(III) phosphate can be converted to the anhydrous xenotime phase by calcination. Nanosized hydrated powders transform into well-crystallized xenotime-type YbPO_{4} above about 800 °C.

=== Optical properties ===
Ytterbium(III) phosphate shows near-infrared absorption and emission associated with the 4f transitions of Yb^{3+}. In well-crystallized xenotime-type material, the ^{2}F_{7/2} and ^{2}F_{5/2} manifolds are split into distinct Stark levels, producing sharp optical features.

The near-infrared photoluminescence intensity increases significantly when hydrated material is calcined to form the ordered xenotime structure.

Cooperative optical transitions involving Yb^{3+}–Yb^{3+} pairs have also been observed in YbPO_{4} crystals.

== Preparation ==
Hydrated ytterbium(III) phosphate can be prepared by precipitation from aqueous solutions containing Yb^{3+} and phosphate ions. A dihydrate has been obtained by reaction of ytterbium(III) chloride with phosphoric acid.

Anhydrous YbPO_{4} can also be prepared from ytterbium(III) oxide using silicon pyrophosphate, SiP_{2}O_{7}:

SiP_{2}O_{7} + Yb_{2}O_{3} → 2 YbPO_{4} + SiO_{2}

Single crystals have also been grown from Yb_{2}O_{3} and ammonium dihydrogen phosphate at high temperature.

== Applications ==
Ytterbium(III) phosphate has been investigated as a host material for near-infrared phosphors and for incorporation into glass–ceramic optical materials. Its chemical stability allows YbPO_{4} particles to survive incorporation into phosphate and silica glass matrices with little reaction.

More recently, xenotime-type YbPO_{4} has been investigated as an environmental barrier coating material for SiC-based ceramic composites because of its thermal expansion behaviour and resistance to steam and molten silicate attack.
