= Ytterbium(III) iodide =

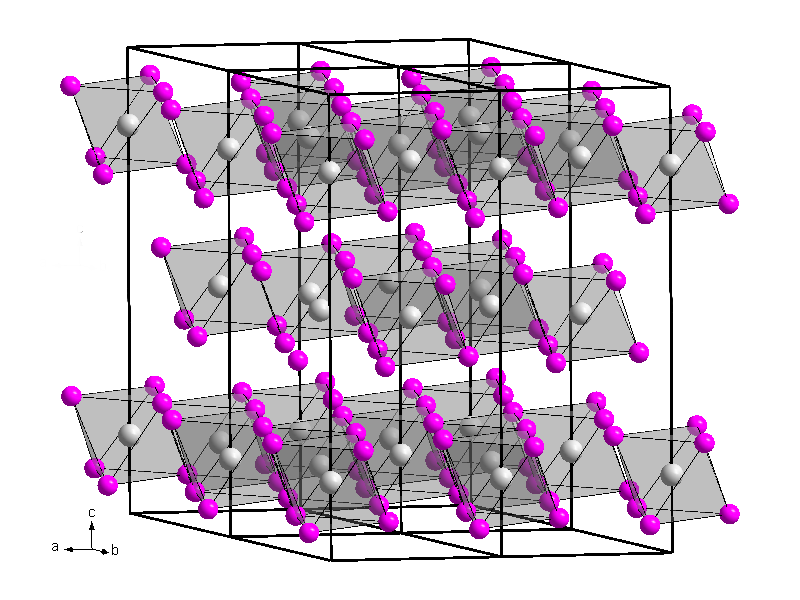

Names
- Other names Ytterbium triiodide Ytterbium iodide

Identifiers
CAS Number	13813-44-0
3D model (JSmol)	Interactive image
ChemSpider	75573
ECHA InfoCard	100.034.053
EC Number	237-474-5
PubChem CID	25212330
CompTox Dashboard (EPA)	DTXSID0065648
- InChI: InChI=1S/3HI.Yb/h3*1H;/q;;;+3/p-3 Key: LSSJSIMBIIVSTN-UHFFFAOYSA-K
- SMILES: [I-].[I-].[I-].[Yb+3]

Properties
Chemical formula	YbI_{3}
Molar mass	553.758 g·mol^{−1}
Appearance	yellow crystals
Melting point	700 °C (1,292 °F; 973 K) decomposes
Solubility in water	soluble

Hazards
- GHS labelling
Pictograms	(GHS07: Exclamation mark)
Signal word	Warning
Hazard statements	H315, H319, H335
Precautionary statements	P261, P264, P264+P265, P271, P280, P302+P352, P304+P340, P305+P351+P338, P319, P321, P332+P317, P337+P317, P362+P364, P403+P233, P405, P501
- Except where otherwise noted, data are given for materials in their standard state (at 25 °C [77 °F], 100 kPa). Infobox references

Ytterbium(III) iodide is one of ytterbium's iodides, with the chemical formula of YbI_{3}.

== Preparation ==
Ytterbium(III) iodide can be prepared by reacting metallic ytterbium with iodine at 500°C with a 30 atm pressure:

2 Yb + 3 I_{2} → 2 YbI_{3}

Ytterbium(III) oxide, ytterbium(III) hydroxide or ytterbium(III) carbonate can react with hydroiodic acid to obtain ytterbium(III) iodide in aqueous solution:

Yb_{2}O_{3} + 6 HI → 2 YbI_{3} + 3 H_{2}O
Yb(OH)_{3} + 3 HI → YbI_{3} + 3 H_{2}O
Yb_{2}(CO_{3})_{3} + 6 HI → 2 YbI_{3} + 3 H_{2}O + 3 CO_{2}

The ytterbium(III) iodide hydrate crystallized from the solution can be heated with ammonium iodide to obtain the anhydrous form.

== Reactions ==
Ytterbium(III) iodide decomposes to ytterbium(II) iodide upon heating:

2 YbI_{3} → 2 YbI_{2} + I_{2}
