= Cooperative luminescence and cooperative absorption =

Cooperative luminescence is the radiative process in which two excited ions simultaneously make downward transition to emit one photon with the sum of their excitation energies. The inverse process is cooperative absorption, in which a photon can be absorbed by a coupled pair of two ions, making them excited simultaneously.
