= Ytterbium(III) fluoride =

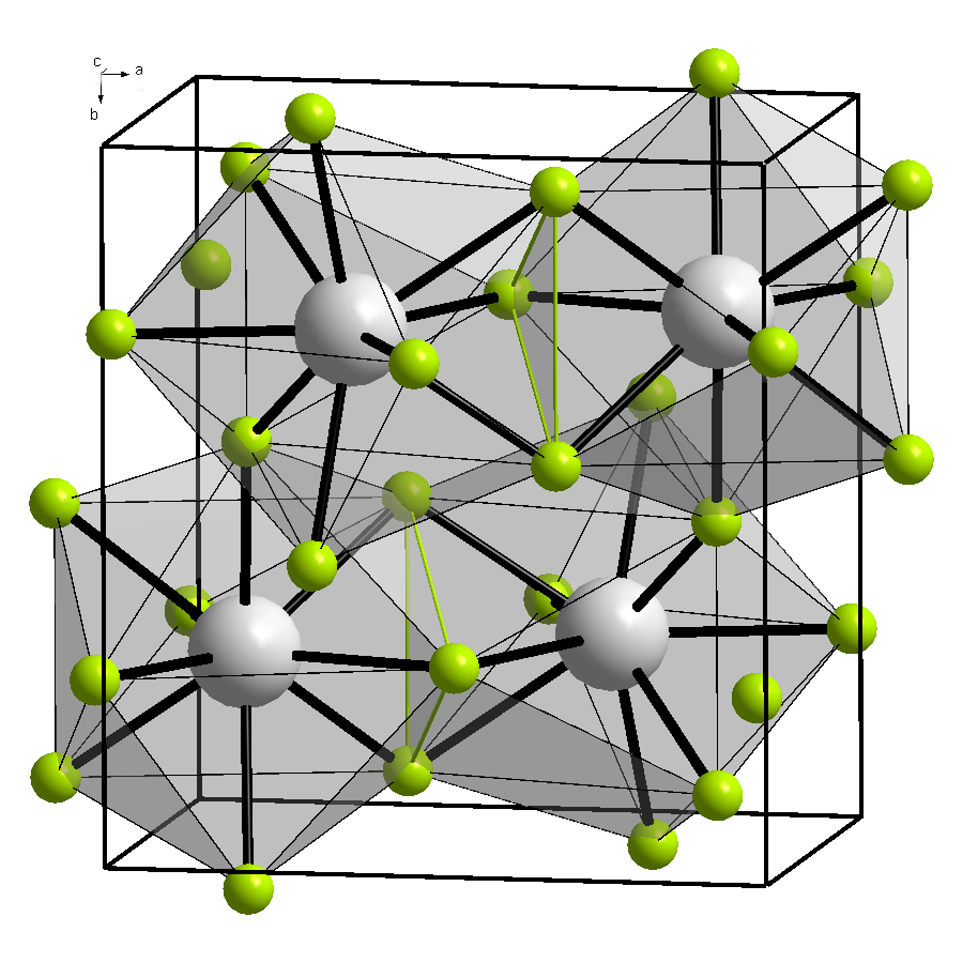

Names
- IUPAC name Ytterbium(III) fluoride
- Other names Ytterbium trifluoride

Identifiers
CAS Number	13760-80-0
3D model (JSmol)	Interactive image
ChemSpider	75533
ECHA InfoCard	100.033.944
EC Number	237-354-2
PubChem CID	83711
CompTox Dashboard (EPA)	DTXSID3065613
- InChI: InChI=1S/3FH.Yb/h3*1H;/q;;;+3/p-3 Key: XASAPYQVQBKMIN-UHFFFAOYSA-K; InChI=1/3FH.Yb/h3*1H;/q;;;+3/p-3 Key: XASAPYQVQBKMIN-DFZHHIFOAQ
- SMILES: F[Yb](F)F

Properties
Chemical formula	YbF_{3}
Molar mass	230.04 g/mol
Appearance	white crystals
Density	8.2 g/cm^{3}
Melting point	1,052 °C (1,926 °F; 1,325 K)
Boiling point	2,380 °C (4,320 °F; 2,650 K)
Solubility in water	insoluble

Structure
Crystal structure	Orthorhombic, oP16, SpaceGroup = Pnma, No. 62

Hazards
NFPA 704 (fire diamond)	2 0 0
- Except where otherwise noted, data are given for materials in their standard state (at 25 °C [77 °F], 100 kPa). verify (what is ?) Infobox references

Ytterbium(III) fluoride (YbF_{3}) is an inorganic chemical compound that is insoluble in water. Like other Ytterbium compounds, it is a rather unremarkable white substance. Ytterbium fluoride has found a niche usage as a radio-opaque agent in the dental industry to aid in the identification of fillings under X-ray examination.
