= Ytterbium(III) nitrate =

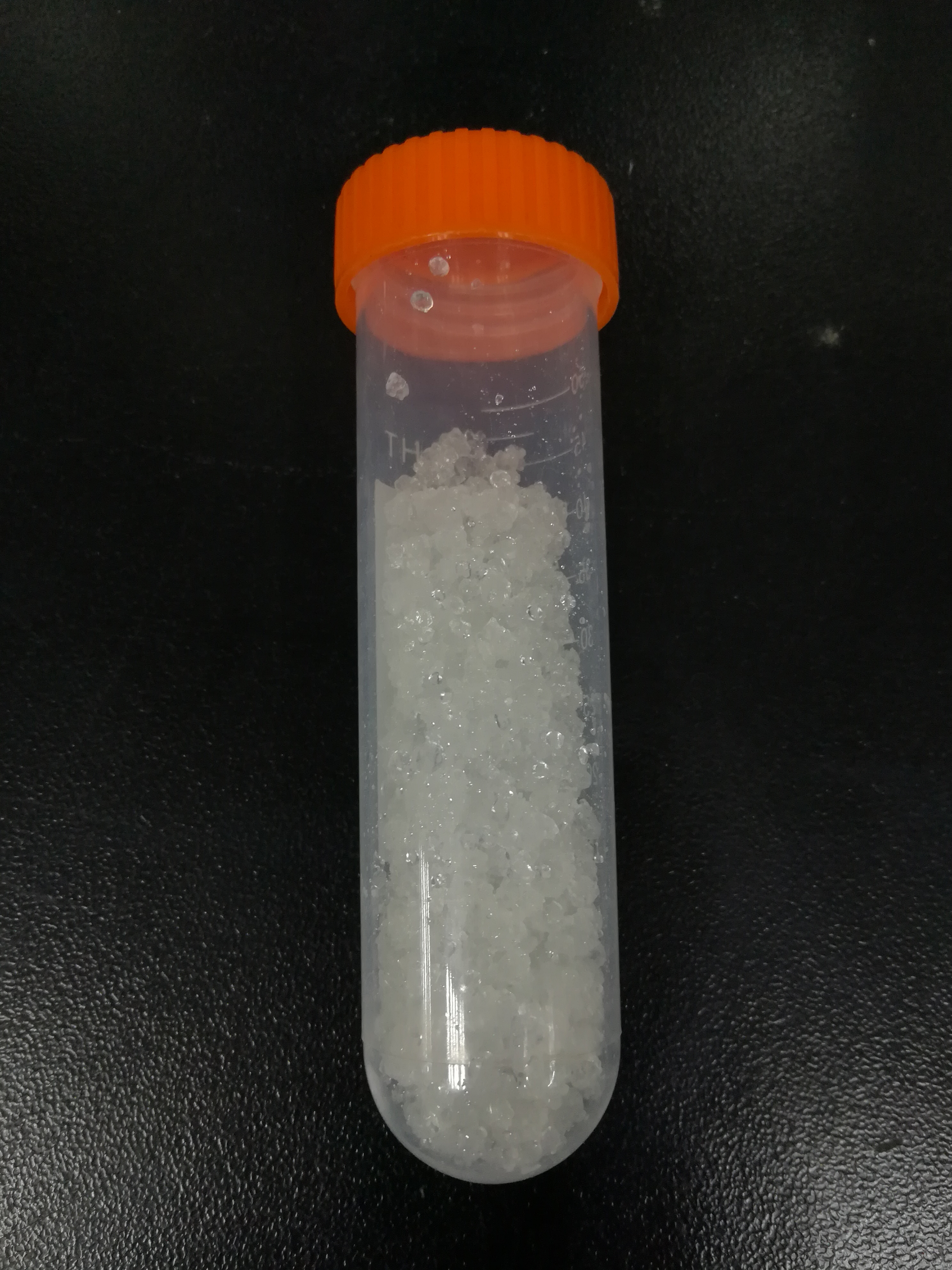

Names
- Other names Ytterbium trinitrate, Ytterbium nitrate

Identifiers
CAS Number	13768-67-7; monohydrate: 35725-34-9
3D model (JSmol)	Interactive image
ChemSpider	32748884; monohydrate: 29434727
ECHA InfoCard	100.033.971
EC Number	237-384-6
PubChem CID	monohydrate: 91886286; pentahydrate: 16211525; hexahydrate: 203097
CompTox Dashboard (EPA)	DTXSID70890718
- InChI: InChI=1S/HNO3.Yb/c2-1(3)4;/h(H,2,3,4); Key: IKWXNJJIPMAOHU-UHFFFAOYSA-N
- SMILES: N(=O)(=O)O.[Yb]

Properties
Chemical formula	Yb(NO_{3})_{3}
Molar mass	359.06
Appearance	Colorless solid
Solubility in water	Soluble

Hazards
- GHS labelling
Pictograms	(GHS03: Oxidizing) (GHS07: Exclamation mark)
Signal word	Warning
Hazard statements	H272, H315, H319, H335
Precautionary statements	P210, P220, P221, P261, P264, P271, P280, P302+P352, P304+P340, P305+P351+P338, P312, P321, P332+P313, P337+P313, P362, P370+P378, P403+P233, P405, P501

Related compounds
Related compounds	Terbium(III) nitrate
- Except where otherwise noted, data are given for materials in their standard state (at 25 °C [77 °F], 100 kPa). Infobox references

Ytterbium(III) nitrate is an inorganic compound, a salt of ytterbium and nitric acid with the chemical formula Yb(NO_{3})_{3}. The compound forms colorless crystals, dissolves in water, and also forms crystalline hydrates.

== Synthesis ==
Reaction of ytterbium and nitric oxide in ethyl acetate:

Yb + 3 N_{2}O_{4} → Yb(NO_{3})_{3} + 3 NO↑

Reaction of ytterbium hydroxide and nitric acid:

Yb(OH)_{3} + 3 HNO_{3} → Yb(NO_{3})_{3} + 3 H_{2}O↑

== Physical properties ==
Ytterbium(III) nitrate forms colorless hygroscopic crystals.

Soluble in water and ethanol.

Forms crystalline hydrates of the composition Yb(NO_{3})_{3}·nH_{2}O, where n = 4, 5, or 6.

== Chemical properties ==
The hydrated ytterbium nitrate thermally decomposes to form YbONO_{3} and decomposes to ytterbium oxide upon further heating.

== Application ==
Ytterbium(III) nitrate hydrate is used for nanoscale coatings of carbon composites.

Also used to obtain metallic ytterbium and as a chemical reagent.

Used as a component for the production of ceramics and glass.
