= Ytterbium(II) iodide =

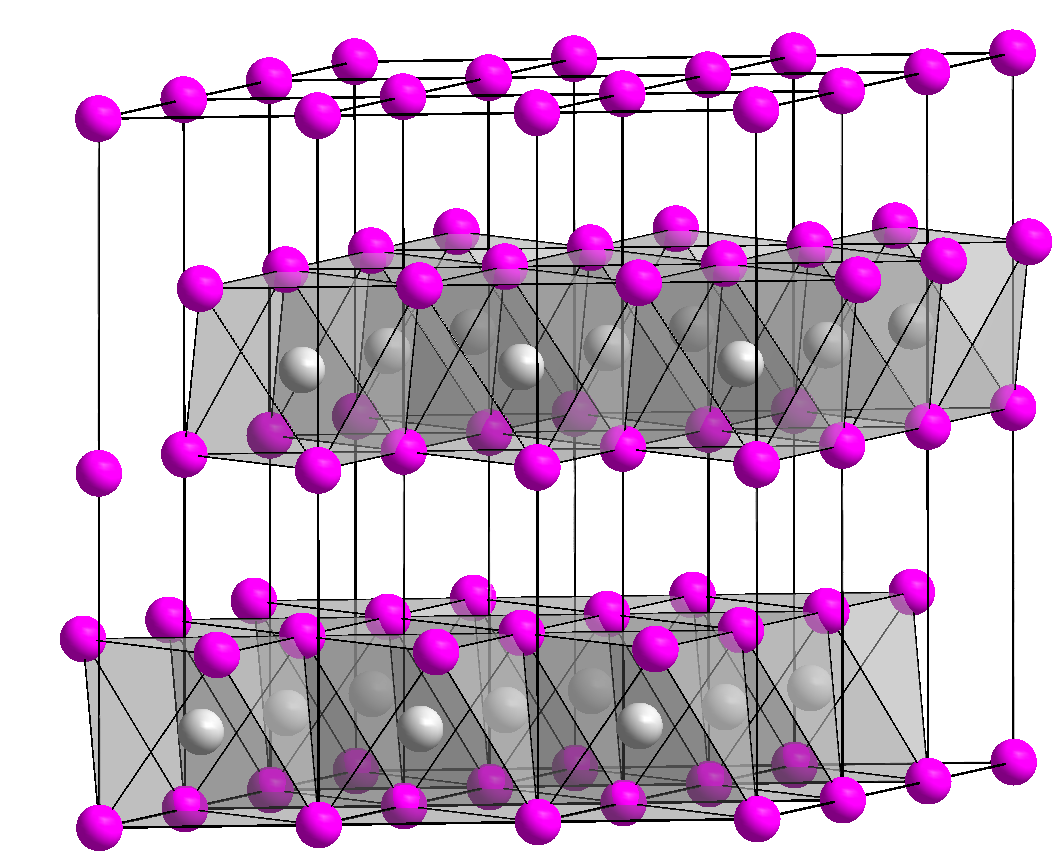

Identifiers
CAS Number	19357-86-9
3D model (JSmol)	Interactive image
ChemSpider	3436141
ECHA InfoCard	100.214.149
EC Number	687-891-5
PubChem CID	4227090
CompTox Dashboard (EPA)	DTXSID10401024
- InChI: InChI=1S/2HI.Yb/h2*1H;/q;;+2/p-2 Key: SJLISRWUWZVXNZ-UHFFFAOYSA-L
- SMILES: [I-].[I-].[Yb+2]

Properties
Chemical formula	I_{2}Yb
Molar mass	426.854 g·mol^{−1}
Appearance	yellow solid
Melting point	780 °C (1,440 °F; 1,050 K) (decomposes)

Structure
Crystal structure	Trigonal
Space group	P3̅m1 (No. 164)
Lattice constant	a = 448 pm, c = 696 pm
- Except where otherwise noted, data are given for materials in their standard state (at 25 °C [77 °F], 100 kPa). Infobox references

Ytterbium(II) iodide is an iodide of ytterbium, with the chemical formula of YbI_{2}. It is a yellow solid.

== Preparation ==
Ytterbium(II) iodide can be prepared by heating ytterbium(III) iodide:

$$\mathrm{2\ YbI_3\ \xrightarrow []{\Delta\ T}\ 2\ YbI_2\ +\ I_2}$$

It can also be prepared by reacting metallic ytterbium with 1,2-diiodoethane in tetrahydrofuran:

$$\mathrm{Yb\ +\ ICH_2CH_2I\ \xrightarrow []{THF} \ YbI_2\ +\ H_2C=CH_2}$$

Although the reaction takes place at room temperature, due to the sensitivity of the reagents it is necessary to work anhydrous and under inert gas. Otherwise, if oxygen is present, rapid oxidation to ytterbium(III) takes place. This can be visually recognized by the color change from green to yellow solution.

== Properties and uses ==
Ytterbium(II) iodide is a yellow solid that is very sensitive to air and moisture and is rapidly oxidized to ytterbium(III). It reacts with water to produce hydrogen gas and basic iodides, and reacts violently with acids. Ytterbium(II) iodide sinters at 0.01 Torr from about 780 °C and gives a viscous melt at about 920 °C. It begins to disproportionate into ytterbium and ytterbium(III) iodide. At around 800 °C, a yellow sublimate of ytterbium(II) iodide is observed on the glass walls; this partly obscures the disproportionation. The melting point can therefore only be determined imprecisely.

Like samarium(II) iodide (SmI_{2}), ytterbium(II) iodide is a reagent used in organic chemical reactions.
