= Thulium(III) acetate =

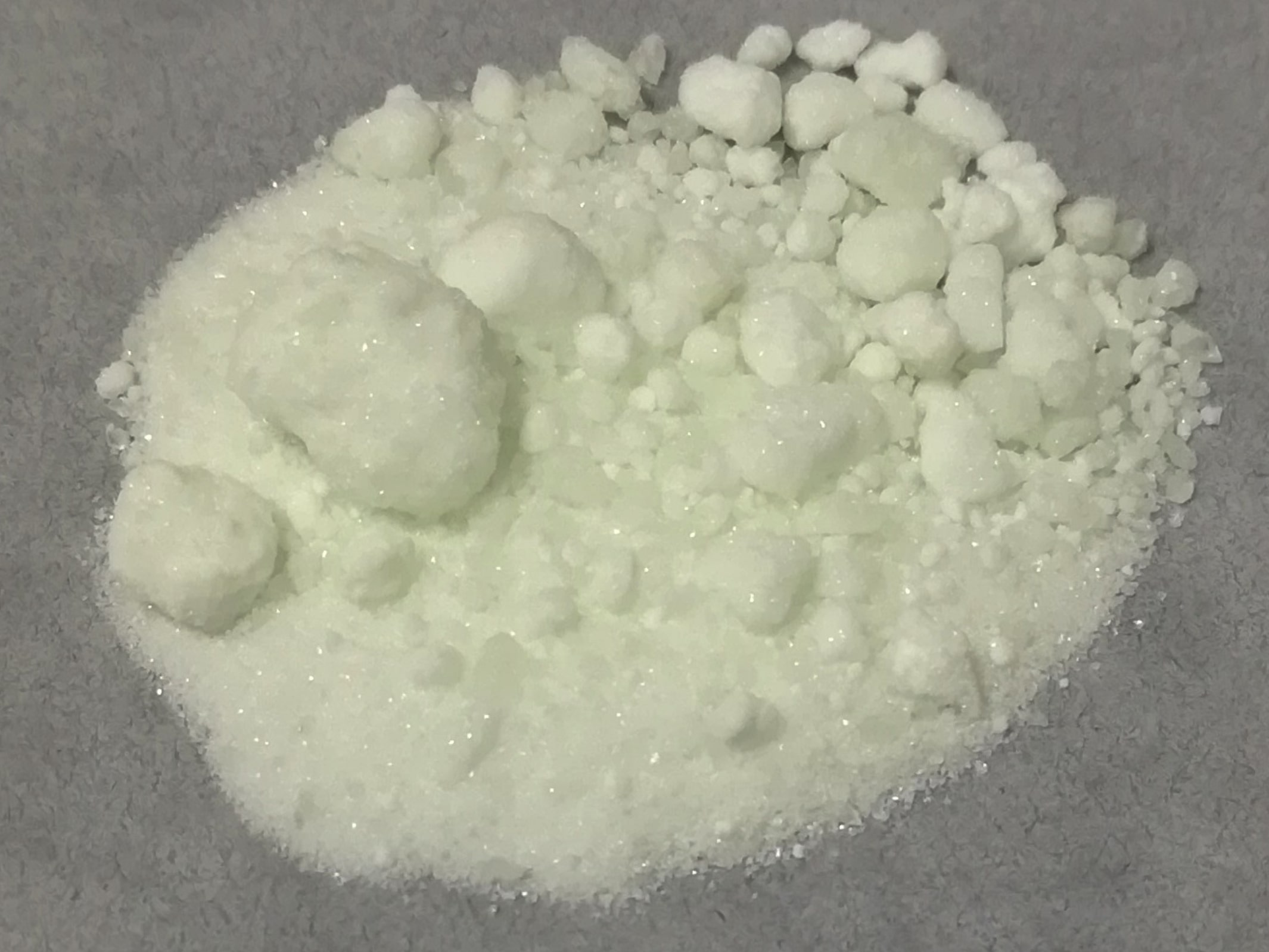

Names
- Other names Thulium acetate Thulium triacetate

Identifiers
| CAS Number | 39156-80-4 |
| 3D model (JSmol) | Interactive image |
| ChemSpider | 148787 |
| ECHA InfoCard | 100.049.369 |
| EC Number | 254-326-5 |
| PubChem CID | 170163 |
| CompTox Dashboard (EPA) | DTXSID50890756 |
- InChI: InChI=1S/3C2H4O2.Tm/c3*1-2(3)4;/h3*1H3,(H,3,4);/q;;;+3/p-3 Key: SNMVVAHJCCXTQR-UHFFFAOYSA-K
- SMILES: CC(=O)[O-].CC(=O)[O-].CC(=O)[O-].[Tm+3]

Properties
| Chemical formula | Tm(CH_{3}COO)_{3} |
| Appearance | crystals |
| Solubility in water | soluble |

Hazards
- GHS labelling
| Pictograms | (GHS07: Exclamation mark) |
| Signal word | Warning |
| Hazard statements | H315, H319, H335 |
| Precautionary statements | P261, P264, P264+P265, P271, P280, P302+P352, P304+P340, P305+P351+P338, P319, P321, P332+P317, P337+P317, P362+P364, P403+P233, P405, P501 |
- Except where otherwise noted, data are given for materials in their standard state (at 25 °C [77 °F], 100 kPa). Infobox references

Thulium(III) acetate is the acetate salt of thulium, with the chemical formula of Tm(CH_{3}COO)_{3}. It can exist in the tetrahydrate or the anhydrous form.

== Properties ==
Thulium(III) acetate reacts with iron acetylacetonate at 300 °C, which can form the hexagonal crystal TmFeO_{3}.

Reacting thulium(III) acetate with trifluoroacetic acid will produce thulium trifluoroacetate:

Tm(CH_{3}COO)_{3} + 3 CF_{3}COOH → Tm(CF_{3}COO)_{3} + 3 CH_{3}COOH

== External reading ==
- Mondry, A., & Bukietyńska, K. (2003). The power and limits of the Judd—Ofelt theory: a case of Pr^{3+} and Tm^{3+} acetates and dipicolinates. Molecular Physics, 101(7), 923-934.
