= Ytterbium(III) hydroxide =

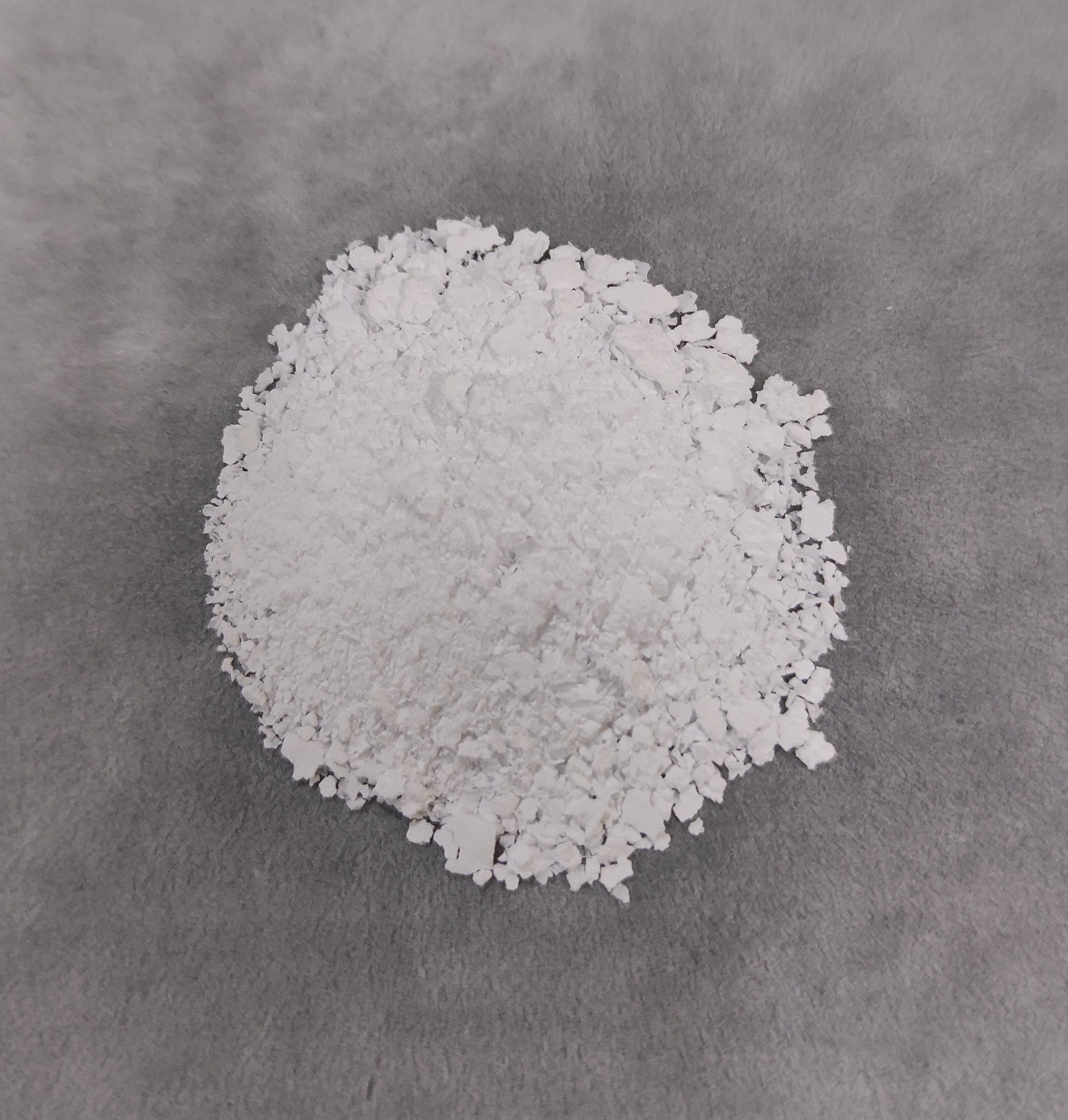

Identifiers
CAS Number	16469-20-8
3D model (JSmol)	Interactive image
ChemSpider	77050
ECHA InfoCard	100.036.819
EC Number	240-518-6
PubChem CID	85436
CompTox Dashboard (EPA)	DTXSID5094022
- InChI: InChI=1S/3H2O.Yb/h3*1H2;/q;;;+3/p-3 Key: SJHMKWQYVBZNLZ-UHFFFAOYSA-K
- SMILES: [OH-].[OH-].[OH-].[Yb+3]

Properties
Chemical formula	Yb(OH)_{3}
Molar mass	224.078
Appearance	white solid

Related compounds
Other anions	ytterbium(III) oxide
Other cations	thulium(III) hydroxide lutetium(III) hydroxide
- Except where otherwise noted, data are given for materials in their standard state (at 25 °C [77 °F], 100 kPa). Infobox references

Ytterbium(III) hydroxide is an inorganic compound with the chemical formula Yb(OH)_{3}.

== Chemical properties ==
Ytterbium(III) hydroxide dissolves in acid to form a ytterbium salt:

Yb(OH)_{3} + 3 H^{+} → Yb^{3+} + 3 H_{2}O

Ytterbium(III) hydroxide is decomposed by heat, first forming YbO(OH), and continuing to heat to obtain Yb_{2}O_{3}. It reacts with aluminum hydroxide oxide (AlOOH) at 1400 °C to obtain Yb_{3}Al_{5}O_{12}.
