= Chemical symbol =

Abbreviations used in chemistry

The periodic table, elements being denoted by their symbols

Chemical symbols are the abbreviations used in chemistry, mainly for chemical elements, but also for functional groups, chemical compounds, and other entities. Element symbols for chemical elements, also known as atomic symbols, normally consist of one or two letters from the Latin alphabet and are written with the first letter capitalised.

== History ==
Earlier symbols for chemical elements stem from classical Latin and Greek words. For some elements, this is because the material was known in ancient times, while for others, the name is a more recent invention. For example, Pb is the symbol for lead (plumbum in Latin); Hg is the symbol for mercury (hydrargyrum in Greek); and He is the symbol for helium (a Neo-Latin name) because helium was not known in ancient Roman times. Some symbols come from other sources, like W for tungsten (Wolfram in German) which was not known in Roman times.

A three-letter temporary symbol may be assigned to a newly synthesized (or not yet synthesized) element. For example, "Uno" was the temporary symbol for hassium (element 108) which had the temporary name of unniloctium, based on the digits of its atomic number. There are also some historical symbols that are no longer officially used.

== Extension of the symbol ==
Annotated example of an atomic symbol

In addition to the letters for the element itself, additional details may be added to the symbol as superscripts or subscripts a particular isotope, ionization, or oxidation state, or other atomic detail. A few isotopes have their own specific symbols rather than just an isotopic detail added to their element symbol.

Attached subscripts or superscripts specifying a nuclide or molecule have the following meanings and positions:

- The nucleon number (mass number) is shown in the left superscript position (e.g., ^{14}N). This number defines the specific isotope. Various letters, such as "m" and "f" may also be used here to indicate a nuclear isomer (e.g., ^{99m}Tc). Alternately, the number here can represent a specific spin state (e.g., ^{1}O_{2}). These details can be omitted if not relevant in a certain context.
- The proton number (atomic number) may be indicated in the left subscript position (e.g., _{64}Gd). The atomic number is redundant to the chemical element, but is sometimes used to emphasize the change of numbers of nucleons in a nuclear reaction.
- If necessary, a state of ionization or an excited state may be indicated in the right superscript position (e.g., state of ionization Ca^{2+}).
- The number of atoms of an element in a molecule or chemical compound is shown in the right subscript position (e.g., N_{2} or Fe_{2}O_{3}). If this number is one, it is normally omitted: the number one is implicitly understood if unspecified.
- A radical is indicated by a dot on the right side (e.g., Cl^{•} for a neutral chlorine atom). This is often omitted unless relevant to a certain context because it is already deducible from the charge and atomic number, as generally true for nonbonded valence electrons in skeletal structures.

Many functional groups also have their own chemical symbol, e.g. Ph for the phenyl group, and Me for the methyl group.

A list of current, dated, as well as proposed and historical signs and symbols is included here with its signification. Also given is each element's atomic number, atomic weight, or the atomic mass of the most stable isotope, group and period numbers on the periodic table, and etymology of the symbol.

== Symbols for chemical elements ==
List of chemical elements
Z	Symbol	Name	Origin of name
1	H	Hydrogen	Greek hydro- and -gen, meaning 'water-forming'
2	He	Helium	Greek hḗlios, 'sun'
3	Li	Lithium	Greek líthos, 'stone'
4	Be	Beryllium	beryl, a mineral (ultimately from the name of Belur in southern India)
5	B	Boron	borax, a mineral (from Arabic bawraq)
6	C	Carbon	Latin carbo, 'coal'
7	N	Nitrogen	Greek nítron and -gen, meaning 'niter-forming'
8	O	Oxygen	Greek oxy- and -gen, meaning 'acid-forming'
9	F	Fluorine	Latin fluere, 'to flow'
10	Ne	Neon	Greek néon, 'new'
11	Na	Sodium	English soda (the symbol Na is derived from Neo-Latin natrium, coined from German Natron, 'natron')
12	Mg	Magnesium	Magnesia, a district of Eastern Thessaly in Greece
13	Al	Aluminium	alumina, from Latin alumen (gen. alumni), 'bitter salt, alum'
14	Si	Silicon	Latin silex, 'flint' (originally silicium)
15	P	Phosphorus	Greek phōsphóros, 'light-bearing'
16	S	Sulfur	Latin sulphur, 'brimstone'
17	Cl	Chlorine	Greek chlōrós, 'greenish yellow'
18	Ar	Argon	Greek argós, 'idle' (because of its inertness)
19	K	Potassium	Neo-Latin potassa, 'potash' (the symbol K is derived from Latin kalium)
20	Ca	Calcium	Latin calx, 'lime'
21	Sc	Scandium	Latin Scandia, 'Scandinavia'
22	Ti	Titanium	Titans, the sons of the Earth goddess of Greek mythology
23	V	Vanadium	Vanadis, an Old Norse name for the Scandinavian goddess Freyja
24	Cr	Chromium	Greek chróma, 'colour'
25	Mn	Manganese	corrupted from magnesia negra; see Magnesium
26	Fe	Iron	English word, ultimately from Proto-Celtic *īsarnom, a word related to the Celtic word for "blood" (the symbol Fe is derived from Latin ferrum)
27	Co	Cobalt	German Kobold, 'goblin'
28	Ni	Nickel	Nickel, a mischievous sprite of German miner mythology
29	Cu	Copper	English word, from Latin cuprum, from Ancient Greek Kýpros 'Cyprus'
30	Zn	Zinc	Most likely from German Zinke, 'prong' or 'tooth', though some suggest Persian sang, 'stone'
31	Ga	Gallium	Latin Gallia, 'France'
32	Ge	Germanium	Latin Germania, 'Germany'
33	As	Arsenic	French arsenic, from Greek arsenikón 'yellow arsenic' (influenced by arsenikós, 'masculine' or 'virile'), from a West Asian wanderword ultimately from Old Iranian *zarniya-ka, 'golden'
34	Se	Selenium	Greek selḗnē, 'moon'
35	Br	Bromine	Greek brômos, 'stench'
36	Kr	Krypton	Greek kryptós, 'hidden'
37	Rb	Rubidium	Latin rubidus, 'deep red'
38	Sr	Strontium	Strontian, a village in Scotland
39	Y	Yttrium	Ytterby, a village in Sweden
40	Zr	Zirconium	zircon, a mineral
41	Nb	Niobium	Niobe, daughter of king Tantalus from Greek mythology
42	Mo	Molybdenum	Greek molýbdaina, 'piece of lead', from mólybdos, 'lead'
43	Tc	Technetium	Greek tekhnētós, 'artificial'
44	Ru	Ruthenium	Neo-Latin Ruthenia, 'Russia'
45	Rh	Rhodium	Greek rhodóeis, 'rose-coloured', from rhódon, 'rose'
46	Pd	Palladium	the asteroid Pallas, considered a planet at the time
47	Ag	Silver	English word, ultimately from Proto-Germanic *silubrą (The symbol derives from Latin argentum)
48	Cd	Cadmium	Neo-Latin cadmia, from King Kadmos
49	In	Indium	Latin indicum, 'indigo' (colour found in its spectrum)
50	Sn	Tin	English word, ultimately from Proto-Germanic *tiną, perhaps meaning "shining" (The symbol derives from Latin stannum)
51	Sb	Antimony	Latin antimonium, the origin of which is uncertain: folk etymologies suggest it is derived from Greek antí ('against') + mónos ('alone'), or Old French anti-moine, 'Monk's bane', but it could plausibly be from or related to Arabic ʾiṯmid, 'antimony', reformatted as a Latin word. (The symbol derives from Latin stibium 'stibnite'.)
52	Te	Tellurium	Latin tellus, 'the ground, earth'
53	I	Iodine	French iode, from Greek ioeidḗs, 'violet'
54	Xe	Xenon	Greek xénon, neuter form of xénos 'strange'
55	Cs	Caesium	Latin caesius, 'sky-blue'
56	Ba	Barium	Greek barýs, 'heavy'
57	La	Lanthanum	Greek lanthánein, 'to lie hidden'
58	Ce	Cerium	the dwarf planet Ceres, considered a planet at the time
59	Pr	Praseodymium	Greek prásios dídymos, 'green twin'
60	Nd	Neodymium	Greek néos dídymos, 'new twin'
61	Pm	Promethium	Prometheus of Greek mythology
62	Sm	Samarium	samarskite, a mineral named after Colonel Vasili Samarsky-Bykhovets, Russian mine official
63	Eu	Europium	Europe
64	Gd	Gadolinium	gadolinite, a mineral named after Johan Gadolin, Finnish chemist, physicist and mineralogist
65	Tb	Terbium	Ytterby, a village in Sweden
66	Dy	Dysprosium	Greek dysprósitos, 'hard to get'
67	Ho	Holmium	Neo-Latin Holmia, 'Stockholm'
68	Er	Erbium	Ytterby, a village in Sweden
69	Tm	Thulium	Thule, the ancient name for an unclear northern location
70	Yb	Ytterbium	Ytterby, a village in Sweden
71	Lu	Lutetium	Latin Lutetia, 'Paris'
72	Hf	Hafnium	Neo-Latin Hafnia, 'Copenhagen' (from Danish havn)
73	Ta	Tantalum	King Tantalus, father of Niobe from Greek mythology
74	W	Tungsten	Swedish tung sten, 'heavy stone' (The symbol is from wolfram, the old name of the tungsten mineral wolframite)
75	Re	Rhenium	Latin Rhenus, 'the Rhine'
76	Os	Osmium	Greek osmḗ, 'smell'
77	Ir	Iridium	Iris, the Greek goddess of the rainbow
78	Pt	Platinum	Spanish platina, 'little silver', from plata 'silver'
79	Au	Gold	English word, ultimately from Proto-Indo-European *ǵʰl̥h₃tóm, related to "yellow" (The symbol derives from Latin aurum)
80	Hg	Mercury	Mercury, Roman god of commerce, communication, and luck, known for his speed and mobility (The symbol is from the element's Latin name hydrargyrum, derived from Greek hydrárgyros, 'water-silver')
81	Tl	Thallium	Greek thallós, 'green shoot or twig'
82	Pb	Lead	English word, from Proto-Celtic *ɸloudom, from Proto-Indo-European *plewd-, “flow” (The symbol derives from Latin plumbum)
83	Bi	Bismuth	German Wismut, from weiß Masse 'white mass', unless from Arabic
84	Po	Polonium	Latin Polonia, 'Poland' (the home country of Marie Curie)
85	At	Astatine	Greek ástatos, 'unstable'
86	Rn	Radon	Radium
87	Fr	Francium	France
88	Ra	Radium	French radium, from Latin radius, 'ray'
89	Ac	Actinium	Greek aktís, 'ray'
90	Th	Thorium	Thor, the Scandinavian god of thunder
91	Pa	Protactinium	proto- (from Greek prôtos, 'first, before') + actinium, which is produced through the radioactive decay of protactinium
92	U	Uranium	Uranus, the seventh planet in the Solar System
93	Np	Neptunium	Neptune, the eighth planet in the Solar System
94	Pu	Plutonium	the dwarf planet Pluto, considered the ninth planet in the Solar System at the time
95	Am	Americium	The Americas, as the element was first synthesised on the continent, by analogy with europium
96	Cm	Curium	Pierre Curie and Marie Curie, French physicists and chemists
97	Bk	Berkelium	Berkeley, California, where the element was first synthesised, by analogy with terbium
98	Cf	Californium	California, where the element was first synthesised
99	Es	Einsteinium	Albert Einstein, German physicist
100	Fm	Fermium	Enrico Fermi, Italian physicist
101	Md	Mendelevium	Dmitri Mendeleev, Russian chemist and inventor who proposed the periodic table
102	No	Nobelium	Alfred Nobel, Swedish chemist and engineer
103	Lr	Lawrencium	Ernest O. Lawrence, American physicist
104	Rf	Rutherfordium	Ernest Rutherford, New Zealand chemist and physicist
105	Db	Dubnium	Dubna, Russia, where the Joint Institute for Nuclear Research is located
106	Sg	Seaborgium	Glenn T. Seaborg, American chemist
107	Bh	Bohrium	Niels Bohr, Danish physicist
108	Hs	Hassium	Neo-Latin Hassia, 'Hesse' (a state in Germany)
109	Mt	Meitnerium	Lise Meitner, Austrian physicist
110	Ds	Darmstadtium	Darmstadt, Germany, where the element was first synthesised
111	Rg	Roentgenium	Wilhelm Conrad Röntgen, German physicist
112	Cn	Copernicium	Nicolaus Copernicus, Polish astronomer
113	Nh	Nihonium	Japanese Nihon, 'Japan' (where the element was first synthesised)
114	Fl	Flerovium	Flerov Laboratory of Nuclear Reactions, part of JINR, where the element was synthesised; itself named after Georgy Flyorov, Russian physicist
115	Mc	Moscovium	Moscow Oblast, Russia, where the element was first synthesised
116	Lv	Livermorium	Lawrence Livermore National Laboratory in Livermore, California, which collaborated with JINR on its synthesis
117	Ts	Tennessine	Tennessee, United States
118	Og	Oganesson	Yuri Oganessian, Russian physicist

== Symbols and names not currently used ==
The following is a list of symbols and names formerly used or suggested for elements, including symbols for placeholder names and names given by discredited claimants for discovery.

Symbol	Name	Atomic number	Notes	Why not used	Refs
A	Argon	18	A used for Argon until 1957. Current symbol is Ar.	(Note: Name changed due to a standardization of, modernization of, or update to older formerly-used symbol.)	
Ab	Alabamine	85	Discredited claim to discovery of astatine.	(Note: Name designated by discredited/disputed claimant.)	
Ad	Aldebaranium	70	Former name for ytterbium.		
Ah	Anglohelvetium	85	Discredited claim to discovery of astatine.		
Ak	Alkalinium	87	Discredited claim to discovery of francium.		
Am	Alabamine	85	Discredited claim to discovery of astatine. The symbol Am is now used for americium.		
An	Athenium	99	Proposed name for einsteinium.	(Note: Name proposed prior to discovery/creation of element or prior to official renaming of a placeholder name.)	
Ao	Ausonium	93	Discredited claim to discovery of neptunium.		
At	Austriacum	84	Discredited claim to discovery of polonium. The symbol At is now used for astatine.		
Az	Azote	7	Former name for nitrogen.		
Bo	Bohemium	93	Discredited claim to discovery of neptunium.		
Bo	Boron	5	Current symbol is B.		
Bv	Brevium	91	Former name for protactinium-234.		
Bz	Berzelium	90	Baskerville wrongly believed berzelium was a new element. Was actually thorium.		
Cb	Columbium	41	Former name for niobium.		
Ch	Chromium	24	Current symbol is Cr.		
Cl	Columbium	41	Former name for niobium. The symbol Cl is now used for chlorine.		
Cm	Catium	87	Proposed name for francium. The symbol Cm is now used for curium.		
Cn	Carolinium	90	Baskerville wrongly believed carolinium to be a new element. Was actually thorium. The symbol Cn is now used for copernicium.		
Cp	Cassiopeium	71	Former name for lutetium.		
Cp	Copernicium	112	Current symbol is Cn.		
Ct	Celtium	72	Discredited claim to discovery of hafnium.		
Ct	Centurium	100	Proposed name for fermium.		
Cy	Cyclonium	61	Proposed name for promethium.		
D	Didymium	59/60	Mixture of the elements praseodymium and neodymium. Mosander wrongly believed didymium to be an element.		
Da	Davyum	43	Discredited claim to discovery of technetium.		
Db	Dubhium	69	Eder wrongly believed dubhium to be a new element. Was actually thulium. The symbol Db is now used for dubnium.		
Db	Dubnium	104	Proposed name for rutherfordium. The symbol and name were instead used for element 105.		
Dc	Decipium	62	Delafontaine wrongly believed decipium to be a new element. Was actually samarium.		
Dc	Dvicaesium	87	Name given by Mendeleev to an as of then undiscovered element. When discovered, francium closely matched the prediction.	(Note: Temporary placeholder name.)	
De	Denebium	69	Eder wrongly believed denebium to be a new element. Was actually thulium.		
Di	Didymium	59/60	Mixture of the elements praseodymium and neodymium. Mosander wrongly believed didymium to be an element.		
Do	Dor	85	Discredited claim to discovery of astatine made by Horia Hulubei and Yvette Cauchois.		
Dn	Dubnadium	118	Proposed name for oganesson.		
Dp	Decipium	62	Delafontaine wrongly believed decipium to be a new element. Was actually samarium.		
Ds	Dysprosium	66	Current symbol is Dy. The symbol Ds is now used for darmstadtium.		
Dt	Dvitellurium	84	Name given by Mendeleev to an as of then undiscovered element. When discovered, polonium closely matched the prediction.		
E	Einsteinium	99	Current symbol is Es.		
E	Erbium	68	Current symbol is Er.		
Ea	Ekaaluminium	31	Name given by Mendeleev to an as of then undiscovered element. When discovered, gallium closely matched the prediction.		
Eb	Ekaboron	21	Name given by Mendeleev to an as of then undiscovered element. When discovered, scandium closely matched the prediction.		
Eb	Erebodium	42	Alexander Pringle wrongly believed erebodium to be a new element. Was likely molybdenum.		
El	Ekaaluminium	31	Name given by Mendeleev to an as of then undiscovered element. When discovered, gallium closely matched the prediction.		
Em	Ekamanganese	43	Name given by Mendeleev to an as of then undiscovered element. When discovered, technetium closely matched the prediction.		
Em	Emanation	86	Also called "radium emanation", the name was originally given by Friedrich Ernst Dorn in 1900. In 1923, this element officially became radon (the name given at one time to ^{222}Rn, an isotope identified in the decay chain of radium).		
Em	Emanium	89	Alternate name formerly proposed for actinium.		
Es	Ekasilicon	32	Name given by Mendeleev to a then undiscovered element. When discovered, germanium closely matched the prediction. The symbol Es is now used for einsteinium.		
Hs	Hesperium	94	Discredited claim to discovery of plutonium. The symbol Hs is now used for hassium.		
Et	Ekatantalum	91	Name given by Mendeleev to an as of then undiscovered element. When discovered, protactinium closely matched the prediction.		
Ex	Euxenium	72	Discredited claim to discovery of hafnium.		
Fa	Francium	87	Current symbol is Fr.		
Fl	Florentium	61	Discredited claim to discovery of promethium. The symbol Fl is now used for flerovium.		
Fl	Fluorine	9	Current symbol is F. The symbol Fl is now used for flerovium.		
Fr	Florentium	61	Discredited claim to discovery of promethium. The symbol Fr is now used for francium.		
G	Glucinium	4	Former name for beryllium.		
Gh	Ghiorsium	118	Discredited claim to discovery of oganesson.		
Gl	Glucinium	4	Former name for beryllium.		
Ha	Hahnium	105	Proposed name for dubnium.		
Hn	Hahnium	108	Proposed name for hassium.		
Hv	Helvetium	85	Discredited claim to discovery of astatine.		
Hy	Mercury	80	Hy from the Greek hydrargyrum for "liquid silver". Current symbol is Hg.		
I	Iridium	77	Current symbol is Ir. The symbol I is now used for iodine.		
Ic	Incognitium	65	Demarçay wrongly believed incognitium to be a new element. Was actually terbium mixed with gadolinium.		
Il	Illinium	61	Discredited claim to discovery of promethium.		
Il	Ilmenium	41/73	Mixture of the elements niobium and tantalum. R. Hermann wrongly believed ilmenium to be an element.		
Io	Ionium	65	Demarçay wrongly believed ionium to be a new element. Was actually terbium.		
J	Jodium	53	Former name for iodine.		
Jg	Jargonium	72	Discredited claim to discovery of hafnium.		
Jl	Joliotium	105	Proposed name for dubnium.		
Jp	Japonium	113	Proposed name for nihonium.		
Ka	Potassium	19	Current symbol is K.		
Ku	Kurchatovium	104	Proposed name for rutherfordium.		
L	Lithium	3	Current symbol is Li.		
Lw	Lawrencium	103	Current symbol is Lr.		
M	Muriaticum	17	Former name for chlorine.		
Ma	Manganese	25	Current symbol is Mn.		
Ma	Masurium	43	Disputed claim to discovery of technetium.		
Md	Mendelevium	97	Proposed name for berkelium. The symbol and name were later used for element 101.		
Ml	Moldavium	87	Discredited claim to discovery of francium made by Horia Hulubei and Yvette Cauchois.		
Ms	Magnesium	12	Current symbol is Mg.		
Ms	Masrium	88	Discredited claim to discovery of radium.		
Ms	Masurium	43	Disputed claim to discovery of technetium.		
Ms	Mosandrium	65	Smith wrongly believed mosandrium to be a new element. Was actually terbium.		
Mv	Mendelevium	101	Current symbol is Md.		
Ng	Norwegium	72	Discredited claim to discovery of hafnium.		
No	Norium	72	Discredited claim to discovery of hafnium. The symbol No is now used for nobelium.		
Np	Neptunium	91	Discredited claim to discovery of protactinium. The symbol and name were later used for element 93.		
Np	Nipponium	43	Discredited claim to discovery of technetium. The symbol Np is now used for neptunium.		
Ns	Nielsbohrium	105	Proposed name for dubnium.		
Ns	Nielsbohrium	107	Proposed name for bohrium.		
Nt	Niton	86	Former name for radon.		
Ny	Neoytterbium	70	Former name for ytterbium.		
P	Lead	82	Current symbol is Pb. The symbol P is now used for phosphorus.		
Pa	Palladium	46	Current symbol is Pd. The symbol Pa is now used for protactinium.		
Pe	Pelopium	41	Former name for niobium.		
Ph	Phosphorus	15	Current symbol is P.		
Pl	Palladium	46	Current symbol is Pd.		
Pm	Polymnestum	33	Alexander Pringle wrongly believed polymnestum to be a new element. Was likely arsenic. The symbol Pm is now used for promethium.		
Po	Potassium	19	Current symbol is K. The symbol Po is now used for polonium.		
Pp	Philippium	67	Delafontaine discovered a new element and named it philippium. Per Teodor Cleve isolated it and renamed it holmium.		
R	Rhodium	45	Current symbol is Rh. (The symbol is now sometimes used for an alkyl group.)		
Rd	Radium	88	Current symbol is Ra.		
Rf	Rutherfordium	106	Proposed name for seaborgium. The symbol and name were instead used for element 104.		
Ro	Rhodium	45	Current symbol is Rh.		
Sa	Samarium	62	Current symbol is Sm.		
So	Sodium	11	Current symbol is Na.		
Sq	Sequanium	93	Discredited claim to discovery of neptunium made by Horia Hulubei and Yvette Cauchois.		
St	Antimony	51	Current symbol is Sb.		
St	Tin	50	Current symbol is Sn.		
Tm	Trimanganese	75	Name given by Mendeleev to an as of then undiscovered element. When discovered, rhenium closely matched the prediction. The symbol Tm is now used for thulium.		
Tn	Tungsten	74	Current symbol is W.		
Tr	Terbium	65	Current symbol is Tb.		
Tu	Thulium	69	Current symbol is Tm.		
Tu	Tungsten	74	Current symbol is W.		
Ur	Uralium	75	Discredited claim to discovery of rhenium.		
Ur	Uranium	92	Current symbol is U.		
Vc	Victorium	64	Crookes wrongly believed victorium to be a new element. Was actually gadolinium.		
Vi	Victorium	64	Crookes wrongly believed victorium to be a new element. Was actually gadolinium.		
Vi	Virginium	87	Discredited claim to discovery of francium.		
Vm	Virginium	87	Discredited claim to discovery of francium.		
Va	Vanadium	23	Current symbol is V.		
Wo	Wolfram	74	Former name for tungsten.		
X	Xenon	54	Current symbol is Xe. The symbol X is now used for any halogen.		
Yt	Yttrium	39	Current symbol is Y.		

=== Systematic chemical symbols ===
These symbols are based on systematic element names, which are now replaced by trivial (non-systematic) element names and symbols. Data is given in order of: atomic number, systematic symbol, systematic name; trivial symbol, trivial name.

- 101: Unu, unnilunium; Md, mendelevium.
- 102: Unb, unnilbium; No, nobelium.
- 103: Unt, unniltrium; Lr, lawrencium.
- 104: Unq, unnilquadium; Rf, rutherfordium.
- 105: Unp, unnilpentium; Db, dubnium.
- 106: Unh, unnilhexium; Sg, seaborgium.
- 107: Uns, unnilseptium; Bh, bohrium.
- 108: Uno, unniloctium; Hs, hassium.
- 109: Une, unnilennium; Mt, meitnerium.
- 110: Uun, ununnilium; Ds, darmstadtium.
- 111: Uuu, unununium; Rg, roentgenium.
- 112: Uub, ununbium; Cn, copernicium.
- 113: Uut, ununtrium; Nh, nihonium.
- 114: Uuq, ununquadium; Fl, flerovium.
- 115: Uup, ununpentium; Mc, moscovium.
- 116: Uuh, ununhexium; Lv, livermorium.
- 117: Uus, ununseptium; Ts, tennessine.
- 118: Uuo, ununoctium; Og, oganesson.

When elements beyond oganesson (starting with ununennium, Uue, element 119), are discovered; their systematic name and symbol will presumably be superseded by a trivial name and symbol.

=== Alchemical symbols ===
The following ideographic symbols were used in alchemy to denote elements known since ancient times. Not included in this list are spurious elements, such as the classical elements fire and water or phlogiston, and substances now known to be compounds. Many more symbols were in at least sporadic use: one early 17th-century alchemical manuscript lists 22 symbols for mercury alone.

Planetary names and symbols for the metals – the seven planets and seven metals known since Classical times in Europe and the Mideast – was ubiquitous in alchemy. The association of what are anachronistically known as planetary metals started breaking down with the discovery of antimony, bismuth and zinc in the 16th century. Alchemists would typically call the metals by their planetary names, e.g. "Saturn" for lead and "Mars" for iron; compounds of tin, iron and silver continued to be called "jovial", "martial" and "lunar"; or "of Jupiter", "of Mars" and "of the moon", through the 17th century. The tradition remains today with the name of the element mercury, where chemists decided the planetary name was preferable to common names like "quicksilver", and in a few archaic terms such as lunar caustic (silver nitrate) and saturnism (lead poisoning).

Alchemical symbols for the modern elements
Symbol	Element	Atomic number	Notes
	Phosphorus	15	(discovered late)
🜍	Sulfur	16	used by Newton
	Manganese	25	late; used by Torbern Bergman (1775)
♂	Iron	26	classical planetary metal of Mars
🜶	Cobalt	27	late; used by Bergman
	Nickel	28	late; used by Bergman (old positional variant of arsenic, previously used for regulus of sulfur)
	Zinc	30	late; used by Bergman
♀	Copper	29	classical planetary metal of Venus
🜺	Arsenic	33	
☾	Silver	47	classical planetary metal of the Moon
🜛	Silver	47	
♃	Tin	50	classical planetary metal of Jupiter
♁	Antimony	51	the newly discovered "eighth metal" was given the symbol for the Earth, which was recognized as a planet by that time
	Platinum	78	late; used by Bergman et al.: a compound of ☉ gold and ☾ silver
⛢	Platinum	78	late; symbol invented for the newly discovered planet Uranus so that it could also be used for newly recognized platinum
🜚	Gold	79	classical variant
☉	Gold	79	medieval variant; planetary metal of the Sun
☿	Mercury	80	classical planetary metal of Mercury
♄	Lead	82	classical planetary metal of Saturn
♆	Bismuth	83	used by Newton
♉︎	Bismuth	83	used by Bergman

=== Daltonian symbols ===
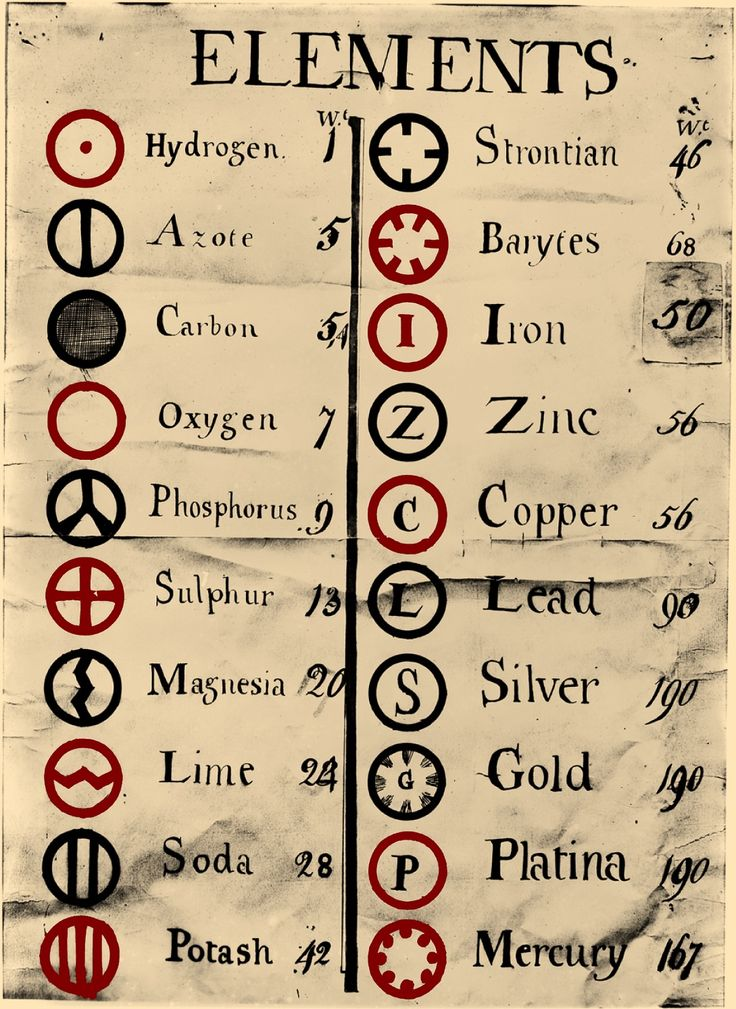
Dalton's symbols for the more common elements, as of 1806, and the relative weights he calculated. The symbols for magnesium and calcium ("lime") were replaced by 1808, and that for gold was simplified.

The following symbols were employed by John Dalton in the early 1800s as the periodic table of elements was being formulated. Not included in this list are symbols for compounds, such as certain rare-earth mineral blends. Modern alphabetic notation was introduced in 1814 by Jöns Jakob Berzelius; its precursor can be seen in Dalton's circled letters for the metals, especially in his augmented table from 1810. A trace of Dalton's conventions also survives in ball-and-stick models of molecules, where balls for carbon are black and for oxygen red.

Daltonian symbols for the elements
Symbol		Dalton's name	Modern name	Atomic number	Notes	Refs
img.	char.	Dalton's name	Modern name	Atomic number	Notes	Refs
	☉	hydrogen		1	or ⊙	
		glucine	beryllium	4	alchemical symbol for 'sugar'	
	●	carbone, carbon	carbon	6		
	⦶	azote	nitrogen/azote	7	alchemical symbol for niter	
	○	oxygen		8	or ◯	
	⦷	soda	sodium	11		
	⊛	magnesia	magnesium	12	alchemical symbol for magnesia	
		alumine	aluminium	13	(4 dots)	
	🟕	silex	silicon	14		
		phosphorus		15	(3 radii)	
	🜨	sulphur		16		
		potash	potassium	19	(3 vertical lines)	
	⦾	lime	calcium	20	or ◎	
		titanium		22	(enclosing circle) Tit⃝	
		manganese		25	(enclosing circle) Ma⃝	
	Ⓘ	iron		26		
	Ⓝ	nickel		28		
		cobalt		27	(enclosing circle) Cob⃝	
	Ⓒ	copper		29	(black letter in red circle)	
	Ⓩ	zinc		30		
		arsenic		33	(enclosing circle) Ar⃝	
		strontian	strontium	38	(4 ticks)	
	⊕︀︀	yttria	yttrium	39	(plus does not touch circle)	
		zircone	zirconium	40	(vertical zigzag)	
	Ⓢ	silver		47		
	Ⓣ	tin		50		
		antimony		51	(enclosing circle) An⃝	
		barytes	barium	56	(6 ticks)	
		cerium		58	(enclosing circle) Ce⃝	
		tungsten		74	(enclosing circle) Tu⃝	
	Ⓟ	platina	platinum	78	(black letter in red circle)	
	Ⓖ	gold		79		
		mercury		80	(dotted inside perimeter)	
	Ⓛ	lead		82		
	Ⓑ	bismuth		83		
	Ⓤ	uranium		92		

== Symbols for named isotopes ==
The following is a list of isotopes which have been given unique symbols. This is not a list of current systematic symbols (in the ^{u}Atom form); such a list can instead be found in Template:Navbox element isotopes. The symbols for isotopes of hydrogen, deuterium (D) and tritium (T), are still in use today, as is thoron (Tn) for radon-220 (though not actinon; usually instead referring to a generic actinide). Heavy water and other deuterated solvents are commonly used in chemistry, and it is convenient to use a single character rather than a symbol with a superscript in these cases (such as D_{2}O instead of ^{2}H_{2}O). The practice also continues with tritium compounds. When the name of the solvent is given, a lowercase d is sometimes used. For example, d_{6}-benzene or C_{6}D_{6} can be used instead of C_{6}[^{2}H_{6}].

The symbols for isotopes of elements other than hydrogen and radon are no longer used in the scientific community. Many of these symbols were designated during the early years of radiochemistry, and several isotopes (namely those in the decay chains of actinium, radium, and thorium) bear placeholder names using the early naming system devised by Ernest Rutherford.

Symbol	Name	Atomic number	Origin of symbol
Ac	Actinium	89	From Greek aktinos. Name restricted at one time to ^{227}Ac, an isotope of actinium. This named isotope later became the official name for element 89.
AcA	Actinium A	84	From actinium and A. Placeholder name given at one time to ^{215}Po, an isotope of polonium identified in the decay chain of actinium.
AcB	Actinium B	82	From actinium and B. Placeholder name given at one time to ^{211}Pb, an isotope of lead identified in the decay chain of actinium.
AcC	Actinium C	83	From actinium and C. Placeholder name given at one time to ^{211}Bi, an isotope of bismuth identified in the decay chain of actinium.
AcC′	Actinium C′	84	From actinium and C′. Placeholder name given at one time to ^{211}Po, an isotope of polonium identified in the decay chain of actinium.
AcC″	Actinium C″	81	From actinium and C″. Placeholder name given at one time to ^{207}Tl, an isotope of thallium identified in the decay chain of actinium.
AcK	Actinium K	87	Name given at one time to ^{223}Fr, an isotope of francium identified in the decay chain of actinium.
AcU	Actino-uranium	92	Name given at one time to ^{235}U, an isotope of uranium.
AcX	Actinium X	88	Name given at one time to ^{223}Ra, an isotope of radium identified in the decay chain of actinium.
An	Actinon	86	From actinium and emanation. Name given at one time to ^{219}Rn, an isotope of radon identified in the decay chain of actinium.
D	Deuterium	1	From the Greek deuteros. Name given to ^{2}H.
Io	Ionium	90	Name given to ^{230}Th, an isotope of thorium identified in the decay chain of uranium.
MsTh_{1}	Mesothorium 1	88	Name given at one time to ^{228}Ra, an isotope of radium.
MsTh_{2}	Mesothorium 2	89	Name given at one time to ^{228}Ac, an isotope of actinium.
Pa	Protactinium	91	From the Greek protos and actinium. Name restricted at one time to ^{231}Pa, an isotope of protactinium. This named isotope later became the official name for element 91.
Ra	Radium	88	From the Latin radius. Name restricted at one time to ^{226}Ra, an isotope of radium. This named isotope later became the official name for element 88.
RaA	Radium A	84	From radium and A. Placeholder name given at one time to ^{218}Po, an isotope of polonium identified in the decay chain of radium.
RaB	Radium B	82	From radium and B. Placeholder name given at one time to ^{214}Pb, an isotope of lead identified in the decay chain of radium.
RaC	Radium C	83	From radium and C. Placeholder name given at one time to ^{214}Bi, an isotope of bismuth identified in the decay chain of radium.
RaC′	Radium C′	84	From radium and C′. Placeholder name given at one time to ^{214}Po, an isotope of polonium identified in the decay chain of radium.
RaC″	Radium C″	81	From radium and C″. Placeholder name given at one time to ^{210}Tl, an isotope of thallium identified in the decay chain of radium.
RaD	Radium D	82	From radium and D. Placeholder name given at one time to ^{210}Pb, an isotope of lead identified in the decay chain of radium.
RaE	Radium E	83	From radium and E. Placeholder name given at one time to ^{210}Bi, an isotope of bismuth identified in the decay chain of radium.
RaE″	Radium E″	81	From radium and E″. Placeholder name given at one time to ^{206}Tl, an isotope of thallium identified in the decay chain of radium.
RaF	Radium F	84	From radium and F. Placeholder name given at one time to ^{210}Po, an isotope of polonium identified in the decay chain of radium.
RdAc	Radioactinium	90	Name given at one time to ^{227}Th, an isotope of thorium.
RdTh	Radiothorium	90	Name given at one time to ^{228}Th, an isotope of thorium.
Rn	Radon	86	From radium and emanation. Name restricted at one time to ^{222}Rn, an isotope of radon identified in the decay chain of radium. This named isotope later became the official name for element 86 in 1923.
T	Tritium	1	From the Greek tritos. Name given to ^{3}H.
Th	Thorium	90	After Thor. Name restricted at one time to ^{232}Th, an isotope of thorium. This named isotope later became the official name for element 90.
ThA	Thorium A	84	From thorium and A. Placeholder name given at one time to ^{216}Po, an isotope of polonium identified in the decay chain of thorium.
ThB	Thorium B	82	From thorium and B. Placeholder name given at one time to ^{212}Pb, an isotope of lead identified in the decay chain of thorium.
ThC	Thorium C	83	From thorium and C. Placeholder name given at one time to ^{212}Bi, an isotope of bismuth identified in the decay chain of thorium.
ThC′	Thorium C′	84	From thorium and C′. Placeholder name given at one time to ^{212}Po, an isotope of polonium identified in the decay chain of thorium.
ThC″	Thorium C″	81	From thorium and C″. Placeholder name given at one time to ^{208}Tl, an isotope of thallium identified in the decay chain of thorium.
ThX	Thorium X	88	Name given at one time to ^{224}Ra, an isotope of radium identified in the decay chain of thorium.
Tn	Thoron	86	From thorium and emanation. Name given to ^{220}Rn, an isotope of radon identified in the decay chain of thorium.
UI	Uranium I	92	Name given at one time to ^{238}U, an isotope of uranium.
UII	Uranium II	92	Name given at one time to ^{234}U, an isotope of uranium.
UX_{1}	Uranium X_{1}	90	Name given at one time to ^{234}Th, an isotope of thorium identified in the decay chain of uranium.
UX_{2}	Uranium X_{2}	91	Name given at one time to ^{234m}Pa, an isotope of protactinium identified in the decay chain of uranium.
UY	Uranium Y	90	Name given at one time to ^{231}Th, an isotope of thorium identified in the decay chain of uranium.
UZ	Uranium Z	91	Name given at one time to ^{234}Pa, an isotope of protactinium identified in the decay chain of uranium.

== Other symbols ==
- In Chinese, each chemical element has a dedicated character, usually created for the purpose (see Chemical elements in East Asian languages). However, in Chinese Latin symbols are also used, especially in formulas.

General:

- A: A deprotonated acid or an anion
- An: any actinide
- B: A base, often in the context of Lewis acid–base theory or Brønsted–Lowry acid–base theory
- E: any element or electrophile
- L: any ligand
- Ln: any lanthanide
- M: any metal
- Mm: mischmetal (occasionally used)
- Ng: any noble gas (Rg is sometimes used, but that is also used for the element roentgenium: see above)
- Nu: any nucleophile
- R: any unspecified radical (moiety) not important to the discussion
- St: steel (occasionally used)
- X: any halogen (or sometimes pseudohalogen)

From organic chemistry:

- Ac: acetyl – (also used for the element actinium: see above)
- Ad: 1-adamantyl
- All: allyl
- Am: amyl (pentyl) – (also used for the element americium: see above)
- Ar: aryl – (also used for the element argon: see above)
- Bn: benzyl
- Bs: brosyl or (outdated) benzenesulfonyl
- Bu: butyl (i-, s-, or t- prefixes may be used to denote iso-, sec-, or tert- isomers, respectively)
- Bz: benzoyl
- Cp: cyclopentadienyl
- Cp*: pentamethylcyclopentadienyl
- Cy: cyclohexyl
- Cyp: cyclopentyl
- Et: ethyl
- Me: methyl
- Mes: mesityl (2,4,6-trimethylphenyl)
- Ms: mesyl (methylsulfonyl)
- Np: neopentyl – (also used for the element neptunium: see above)
- Ns: nosyl
- Pent: pentyl
- Ph, Φ: phenyl
- Pr: propyl – (i- prefix may be used to denote isopropyl. Also used for the element praseodymium: see above)
- R: In organic chemistry contexts, an unspecified "R" is often understood to be an alkyl group
- Tf: triflyl (trifluoromethanesulfonyl)
- Tr, Trt: trityl (triphenylmethyl)
- Ts, Tos: tosyl (para-toluenesulfonyl) – (Ts also used for the element tennessine: see above)
- Vi: vinyl

From organometallic chemistry:

- Fc, ferrocenyl: (C_{5}H_{5})Fe(C_{5}H_{4})
- Fp, (Cyclopentadienyl)iron dicarbonyl: (C_{5}H_{5})Fe(CO)_{2}

Exotic atoms:

- Mu: muonium
- Pn: protonium
- Ps: positronium

== See also ==
- List of chemical elements naming controversies
- List of elements
- Nuclear notation
