= Charles Baskerville =

Charles Baskerville may refer to:

- Charles Baskerville (chemist) (1870–1922), American chemist
- Charles Baskerville (painter) (1896–1994), his son, American artist
- Sir Charles Baskerville, a character in the 1902 Sherlock Holmes novel The Hound of the Baskervilles
