= Europium sulfate =

Europium sulfate may refer to:

- Europium(II) sulfate, EuSO_{4}
- Europium(III) sulfate, Eu_{2}(SO_{4})_{3}
