= Europium =

Europium, _{63}Eu
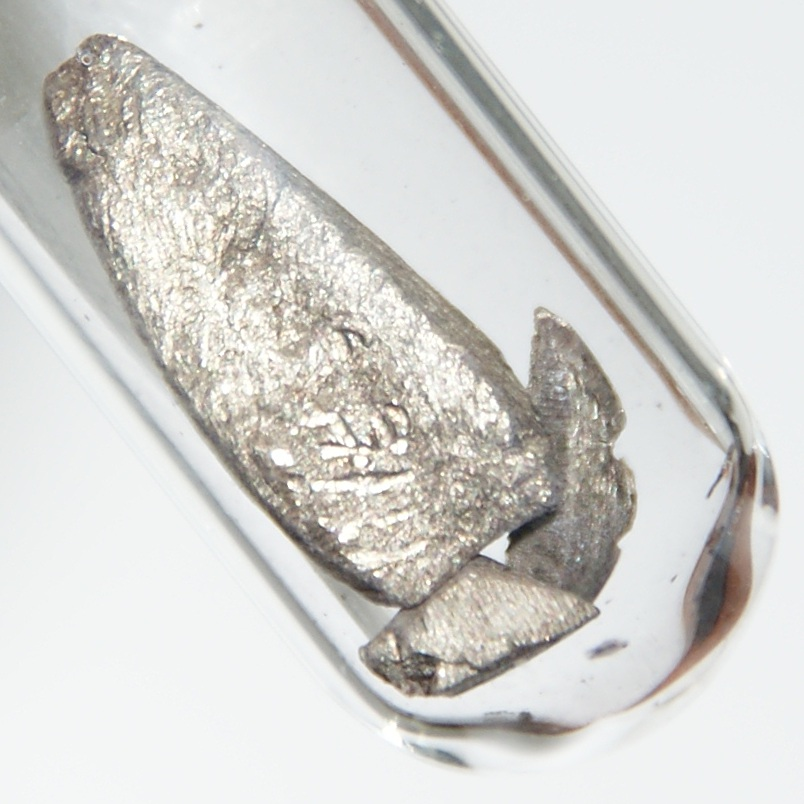

Europium
- Pronunciation: /jʊˈroʊpiəm/ (yuu-ROH-pee-əm)
- Appearance: silvery white, with a pale yellow tint; but rarely seen without oxide discoloration

Standard atomic weight A_{r}°(Eu)
- 151.964±0.001; 151.96±0.01 (abridged)

Europium in the periodic table
Hydrogen																															Helium
Lithium	Beryllium																									Boron	Carbon	Nitrogen	Oxygen	Fluorine	Neon
Sodium	Magnesium																									Aluminium	Silicon	Phosphorus	Sulfur	Chlorine	Argon
Potassium	Calcium															Scandium	Titanium	Vanadium	Chromium	Manganese	Iron	Cobalt	Nickel	Copper	Zinc	Gallium	Germanium	Arsenic	Selenium	Bromine	Krypton
Rubidium	Strontium															Yttrium	Zirconium	Niobium	Molybdenum	Technetium	Ruthenium	Rhodium	Palladium	Silver	Cadmium	Indium	Tin	Antimony	Tellurium	Iodine	Xenon
Caesium	Barium	Lanthanum	Cerium	Praseodymium	Neodymium	Promethium	Samarium	Europium	Gadolinium	Terbium	Dysprosium	Holmium	Erbium	Thulium	Ytterbium	Lutetium	Hafnium	Tantalum	Tungsten	Rhenium	Osmium	Iridium	Platinum	Gold	Mercury (element)	Thallium	Lead	Bismuth	Polonium	Astatine	Radon
Francium	Radium	Actinium	Thorium	Protactinium	Uranium	Neptunium	Plutonium	Americium	Curium	Berkelium	Californium	Einsteinium	Fermium	Mendelevium	Nobelium	Lawrencium	Rutherfordium	Dubnium	Seaborgium	Bohrium	Hassium	Meitnerium	Darmstadtium	Roentgenium	Copernicium	Nihonium	Flerovium	Moscovium	Livermorium	Tennessine	Oganesson
–
↑
Eu
↓
Am
samarium ← europium → gadolinium
- Atomic number (Z): 63
- Group: f-block groups (no number)
- Period: period 6
- Block: f-block
- Electron configuration: [Xe] 4f^{7} 6s^{2}
- Electrons per shell: 2, 8, 18, 25, 8, 2

Physical properties
- Phase at STP: solid
- Melting point: 1099 K (826 °C, 1519 °F)
- Boiling point: 1802 K (1529 °C, 2784 °F)
- Density (at 20° C): 5.246 g/cm^{3}
- when liquid (at m.p.): 5.13 g/cm^{3}
- Heat of fusion: 9.21 kJ/mol
- Heat of vaporization: 176 kJ/mol
- Molar heat capacity: 27.66 J/(mol·K)
- Specific heat capacity: 182.022 J/(kg·K)
Vapor pressure
P (Pa)	1	10	100	1 k	10 k	100 k
at T (K)	863	957	1072	1234	1452	1796

Atomic properties
- Oxidation states: common: +2, +3; 0
- Electronegativity: Pauling scale: 1.2
- Ionization energies: 1st: 547.1 kJ/mol; 2nd: 1085 kJ/mol; 3rd: 2404 kJ/mol
- Atomic radius: empirical: 180 pm
- Covalent radius: 198±6 pm
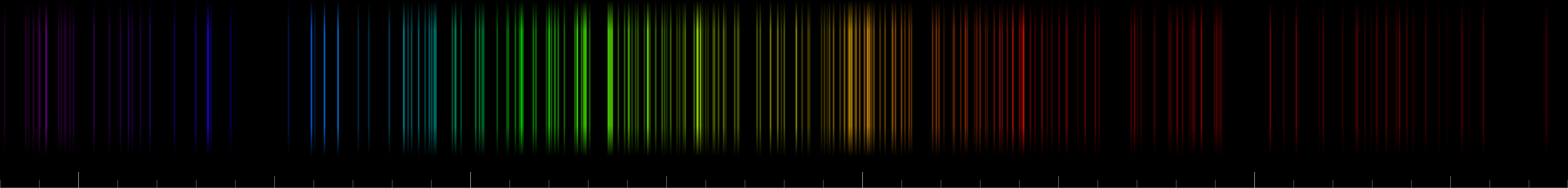
- Spectral lines of europium

Other properties
- Natural occurrence: primordial
- Crystal structure: body-centered cubic (bcc) (cI2)
- Lattice constant: a = 458.22 pm (at 20 °C)
- Thermal expansion: 26.3×10^{−6}/K (at 20 °C)
- Thermal conductivity: est. 13.9 W/(m⋅K)
- Electrical resistivity: poly: 0.900 µΩ⋅m (at r.t.)
- Magnetic ordering: paramagnetic
- Molar magnetic susceptibility: +34000.0×10^{−6} cm^{3}/mol
- Young's modulus: 18.2 GPa
- Shear modulus: 7.9 GPa
- Bulk modulus: 8.3 GPa
- Poisson ratio: 0.152
- Vickers hardness: 165–200 MPa
- CAS Number: 7440-53-1

History
- Naming: after Europe
- Discovery: Eugène-Anatole Demarçay (1896)
- First isolation: 1937

Isotopes of europium
Main isotopes			Decay	
Isotope	abundance	half-life (t_{1/2})	mode	product
^{150}Eu	synth	36.9 y	β^{+}	^{150}Sm
^{151}Eu	47.8%	4.6×10^{18} y	α	^{147}Pm
^{152}Eu	synth	13.517 y	β^{+}	^{152}Sm
^{152}Eu	synth	13.517 y	β^{−}	^{152}Gd
^{153}Eu	52.2%	stable		
^{154}Eu	synth	8.592 y	β^{−}	^{154}Gd
^{154}Eu	synth	8.592 y	ε	^{154}Sm
^{155}Eu	synth	4.742 y	β^{−}	^{155}Gd

Europium is a chemical element; it has symbol Eu and atomic number 63. It is a soft, silvery-white lanthanide metal that tarnishes rapidly in air and is the most chemically reactive of the lanthanides. Europium has an unusually low density and large atomic volume for a lanthanide because the metal is effectively divalent, unlike the predominantly trivalent neighbouring elements. Its half-filled 4f^{7} electron configuration also gives elemental europium distinctive magnetic properties; it is paramagnetic at room temperature and becomes antiferromagnetic below about 91 K. In compounds, the +3 oxidation state is generally the most stable, but europium has the most readily accessible +2 state of any lanthanide.

Europium does not occur naturally as the free metal and is found only as a minor component of rare-earth minerals such as bastnäsite, monazite and xenotime. Its ability to form Eu(II) gives it unusual geochemical behaviour: europium can be preferentially incorporated into feldspar, producing positive or negative europium anomalies that are widely used in petrology and geochemistry. Naturally occurring europium consists of two isotopes in nearly equal proportions, ^{151}Eu and ^{153}Eu. ^{153}Eu is observationally stable, while ^{151}Eu is a very long-lived alpha emitter with a half-life of about 4.6×10^{18} years.

The identification of europium formed part of the long 19th-century process of separating the rare-earth elements. William Crookes observed an unexplained spectral feature in rare-earth material in 1885, and Paul Émile Lecoq de Boisbaudran reported a further unidentified line in samarium in 1892. In 1896, the French chemist Eugène-Anatole Demarçay reported evidence for a new element associated with samarium; after repeated fractional crystallisation, he obtained it in sufficiently pure form in 1901 and named it europium after Europe. Elemental europium metal was prepared several decades later.

The major applications of europium exploit its luminescence. Eu(III) produces narrow orange-red emission lines, whereas Eu(II) gives broad, host-dependent emission that can span much of the visible spectrum. Europium phosphors became commercially important in the 1960s as red emitters in colour television and remain important in lighting, light-emitting diodes, display technologies, persistent luminescent materials and radiation detectors. Europium complexes are also used in anti-counterfeiting materials, time-resolved biochemical assays and specialised NMR applications. Europium has no known biological role, and toxicological data remain limited; the elemental metal is pyrophoric and must be protected from air and moisture.

== Physical properties ==
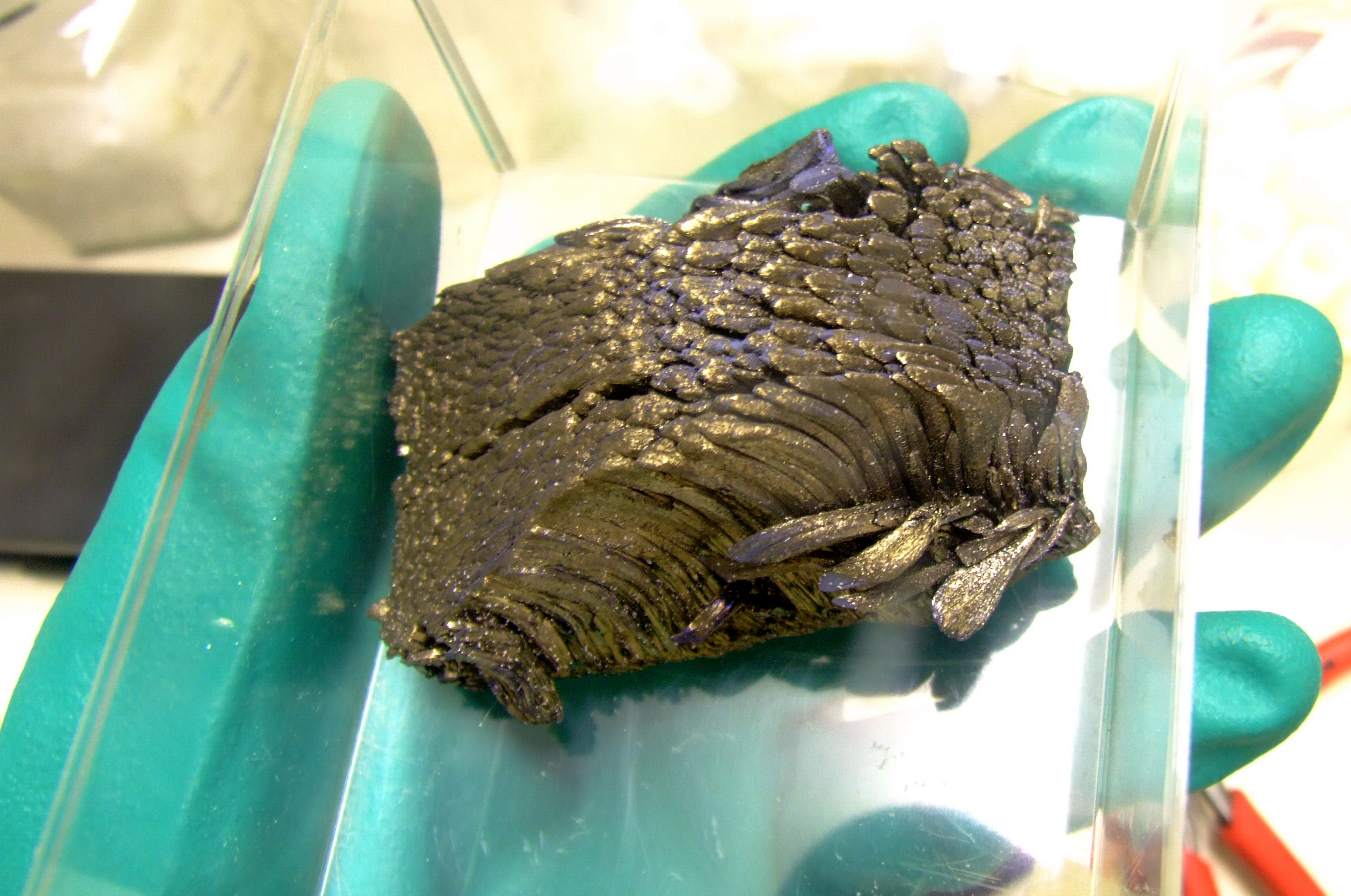
About 300 g of dendritic sublimated 99.998% pure europium handled in a glove box

Europium is a soft, silvery-white, ductile rare-earth metal. Its hardness is similar to that of lead. At room temperature it has a density of about 5.24 g/cm^{3} and a melting point of 822 °C (1,095 K).

The ground-state electron configuration of a neutral europium atom is [Xe] 4f^{7}6s^{2}, with the spectroscopic ground term ^{8}S^{o}_{7/2}. The seven 4f electrons form a particularly stable half-filled shell. In the metallic state the 4f electrons remain strongly localised, and europium is effectively divalent rather than trivalent, in contrast with most of the lanthanides. This behaviour is shared with ytterbium, whose filled 4f shell likewise favours a divalent metallic state. Consequently, europium and ytterbium have substantially larger atomic volumes than the neighbouring trivalent lanthanide metals.

At ambient pressure, europium crystallizes in the body-centered cubic (bcc) structure. Its unusually large atomic volume is associated with its divalent metallic state. Under pressure, europium undergoes a series of structural transformations. The bcc phase transforms to a hexagonal close-packed structure at about 12.5 GPa, which remains stable to about 31.5 GPa. Above this pressure europium adopts an incommensurately modulated monoclinic structure, known as Eu-IV, which is stable to about 37 GPa; another structural transition occurs at higher pressure.

The half-filled 4f shell also dominates the magnetic properties of elemental europium. The divalent 4f^{7} configuration has L = 0 and S = J = 7/2, giving a large predominantly spin magnetic moment. Europium is paramagnetic at room temperature, but below a Néel temperature of about 91 K it becomes antiferromagnetic. Neutron-diffraction measurements show that the ordered state has a helical spin structure, with the magnetic moments lying parallel to a cube face and rotating from one atomic plane to the next. The ordered magnetic moment was measured as 5.9 ± 0.4 μ_{B} per atom.

== Chemical properties ==
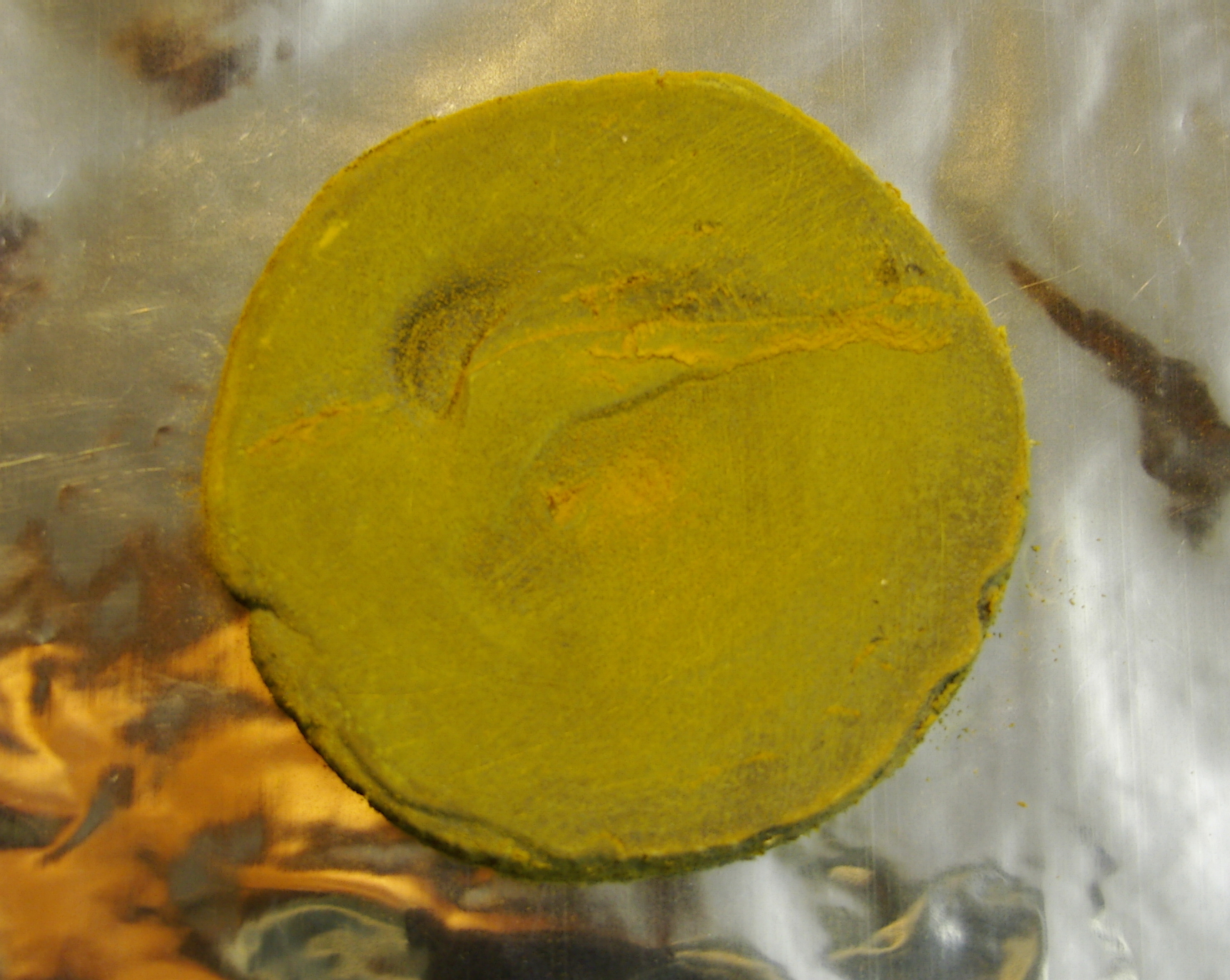
Air-oxidized europium

Europium is a highly electropositive and reactive metal, and is the most reactive of the lanthanide metals. Fresh europium is silvery-white, but it rapidly tarnishes on exposure to air. When heated in oxygen it burns readily to form europium(III) oxide, Eu_{2}O_{3}:

4 Eu + 3 O_{2} → 2 Eu_{2}O_{3}

Europium reacts slowly with cold water and more rapidly with hot water, liberating hydrogen and forming europium(III) hydroxide:

2 Eu + 6 H_{2}O → 2 Eu(OH)_{3} + 3 H_{2}

The metal also reacts readily with the halogens and combines with several other nonmetals on heating. It dissolves readily in dilute non-oxidising acids, evolving hydrogen and forming Eu(III) in solution. The net ionic reaction is:

2 Eu + 6 H^{+} → 2 Eu^{3+} + 3 H_{2}

Aqueous Eu(III) solutions are very pale pink, and the hydrated ion is commonly represented as [Eu(H_{2}O)_{9}]^{3+}. Europium ions generally adopt high coordination numbers. Eu(III) behaves as a hard Lewis acid and favours hard donor atoms, particularly oxygen, whereas the larger Eu(II) ion is softer and shows greater affinity for softer donors such as nitrogen and sulfur.

=== Oxidation states ===
The conventional chemistry of europium is dominated by the +3 and +2 oxidation states. Eu(III), with the electron configuration 4f^{6}, is the more stable oxidation state under ordinary oxidising conditions. Europium is unusual among the lanthanides, however, because Eu(II) is also readily accessible. Eu(II) has the half-filled 4f^{7} configuration, which contributes to the relative stability of the divalent state; europium has the most accessible +2 oxidation state of any lanthanide.

In aqueous solution, the standard reduction potential of the Eu(III)/Eu(II) couple is about −0.34 V relative to the standard hydrogen electrode. Eu(III) can therefore be reduced to Eu(II) substantially more readily than the corresponding trivalent ions of most other lanthanides. Eu(II) is a mild reducing agent and is readily oxidised by molecular oxygen to Eu(III), although it is sufficiently persistent under oxygen-free conditions for an extensive aqueous and coordination chemistry to be developed.

The Eu(II) ion is substantially larger than Eu(III) and in size closely resembles Sr(II). The ionic radii of Eu(II) and Sr(II) are very similar, although Eu(II) is slightly softer and consequently shows differences in solvation and coordination; for example, X-ray absorption measurements found lower coordination numbers for Eu(II) than for Sr(II) in several oxygen-donor solvents. The large difference in ionic radius and electronic configuration between Eu(II) and Eu(III) gives the two oxidation states markedly different coordination, magnetic and optical properties.

== Compounds ==
Europium forms a wide variety of inorganic, coordination and organometallic compounds. Unlike most lanthanides, for which the +3 oxidation state overwhelmingly dominates ordinary chemistry, europium has extensive chemistry in both the +3 and +2 states. Eu(III) is generally more stable under oxidising conditions, but the half-filled 4f^{7} configuration makes Eu(II) unusually accessible. The two oxidation states consequently have markedly different structural, magnetic and optical properties.

=== Oxides and chalcogenides ===
Europium forms three well-established binary oxides. Europium(II) oxide, EuO, contains divalent europium and has the cubic rock salt structure. Eu_{3}O_{4} is a mixed-valence oxide containing both Eu(II) and Eu(III). Europium(III) oxide, Eu_{2}O_{3}, contains only trivalent europium and is the stable sesquioxide under ordinary oxidising conditions. At ambient conditions Eu_{2}O_{3} has the cubic C-type rare-earth sesquioxide structure; monoclinic and trigonal polymorphs occur at elevated temperature or pressure. Eu_{3}O_{4} has an orthorhombic structure related to the CaFe_{2}O_{4} type, with Eu(II) and Eu(III) occupying distinct crystallographic sites.

EuO is a ferromagnetic semiconductor below a Curie temperature of about 69 K, and has been extensively studied because of the strong coupling between its magnetic and electronic properties. The heavier monochalcogenides EuS, EuSe and EuTe likewise contain Eu(II) and crystallize in the rock-salt structure. They form a classic series of magnetic semiconductors: EuS is ferromagnetic at low temperature, EuSe exhibits competing ferro- and antiferromagnetic interactions, and EuTe is antiferromagnetic.

Europium also forms mixed-anion chalcogenides. Europium oxysulfide, Eu_{2}O_{2}S, contains Eu(III) and exhibits the characteristic sharp visible emission of the trivalent ion.

=== Halides ===
Europium(III) chloride

Europium forms all four trihalides, EuF_{3}, EuCl_{3}, EuBr_{3} and EuI_{3}, as well as the complete corresponding series of divalent halides EuF_{2}, EuCl_{2}, EuBr_{2} and EuI_{2}. The existence of a complete Eu(II) halide series reflects the exceptional stability of divalent europium. EuF_{3} is white, EuCl_{3} yellow, EuBr_{3} grey and EuI_{3} colourless; the divalent halides are generally white to yellow solids.

The crystal structures vary considerably across the series. EuF_{2} adopts the cubic fluorite structure, whereas EuCl_{2} has the orthorhombic PbCl_{2}-type structure; several structural forms of EuI_{2} are known. The structural resemblance of many Eu(II) halides to alkaline-earth halides reflects the similar size of Eu^{2+} and the heavier alkaline-earth ions.

The Eu(II) halides also show characteristic 4f–5d luminescence. Solid EuCl_{2}, EuBr_{2} and EuI_{2} fluoresce under ultraviolet excitation, with broad emission bands whose positions depend strongly on the halide ligand; EuCl_{2}, for example, emits in the blue region.

=== Hydrides ===
The binary hydride europium dihydride, EuH_{2}, is an ionic compound containing Eu(II). Neutron-diffraction measurements on the corresponding deuteride show that it adopts the orthorhombic PbCl_{2}-type structure, with nine-coordinate europium. Although earlier pressure–composition measurements suggested appreciable hydrogen deficiency, diffraction measurements on equilibrated samples indicate essentially fully occupied hydrogen sites.

Europium hydride chemistry extends beyond the binary hydride. EuLiH_{3} contains Eu(II) and crystallizes in the cubic inverse-perovskite structure, with twelve-coordinate europium. Complex ternary hydrides including EuMg_{2}H_{6} and EuMgH_{4} are also known. Structural, electrical and magnetic measurements indicate that europium remains divalent in the europium hydrides studied, in contrast to samarium, which can readily become trivalent in its hydrides.

=== Borides and carbides ===
Among the europium borides, europium hexaboride, EuB_{6}, is particularly well studied. It has the cubic CaB_{6}-type structure, in which a three-dimensional framework of linked B_{6} octahedra surrounds the europium ions. Unlike most rare-earth hexaborides, europium is divalent in EuB_{6}. EuB_{6} is a ferromagnetic semimetal and undergoes two closely spaced electronic and magnetic transitions near 15.5 and 12.6 K. Its unusual transport properties, including large magnetoresistance, have been associated with the formation and subsequent overlap of magnetic polarons.

Europium also forms europium dicarbide, EuC_{2}. Pure EuC_{2} contains Eu(II) and discrete C_{2}^{2−} units and crystallizes in the monoclinic ThC_{2}-type structure at room temperature. On heating, it passes through a narrow tetragonal stability range before transforming to a cubic high-temperature phase. EuC_{2} becomes ferromagnetic at about 15 K and is semiconducting above the transition; near the Curie temperature its electrical resistance is strongly reduced by an applied magnetic field, producing a pronounced colossal magnetoresistance effect.

=== Pnictides ===
Europium forms binary compounds with all of the pnictogens, but the preferred valence of europium changes across the series. Europium nitride, EuN, can be prepared by direct reaction of the metal with ammonia at about 600 °C and crystallizes in the cubic rock-salt structure. Europium phosphide, EuP, can be prepared through reactions of europium in liquid ammonia with phosphine.

Electronic-structure calculations illustrate the strong change in valence across the europium pnictides. EuN and EuP favour predominantly trivalent europium, whereas EuSb favours Eu(II); EuAs lies close to the crossover between the two regimes. Experimentally, EuAs has been found to contain divalent europium and As_{2}^{2−} units, giving it a distorted Na_{2}O_{2}-type structure rather than the simple rock-salt structure common to many trivalent rare-earth monopnictides.

The europium–arsenic system is particularly rich. Besides EuAs, arsenic-rich phases including Eu_{3}As_{4}, Eu_{2}As_{3}, EuAs_{2} and EuAs_{3} have been characterised, several with structure types not shared by the simple rare-earth monopnictides.

=== Other inorganic compounds ===
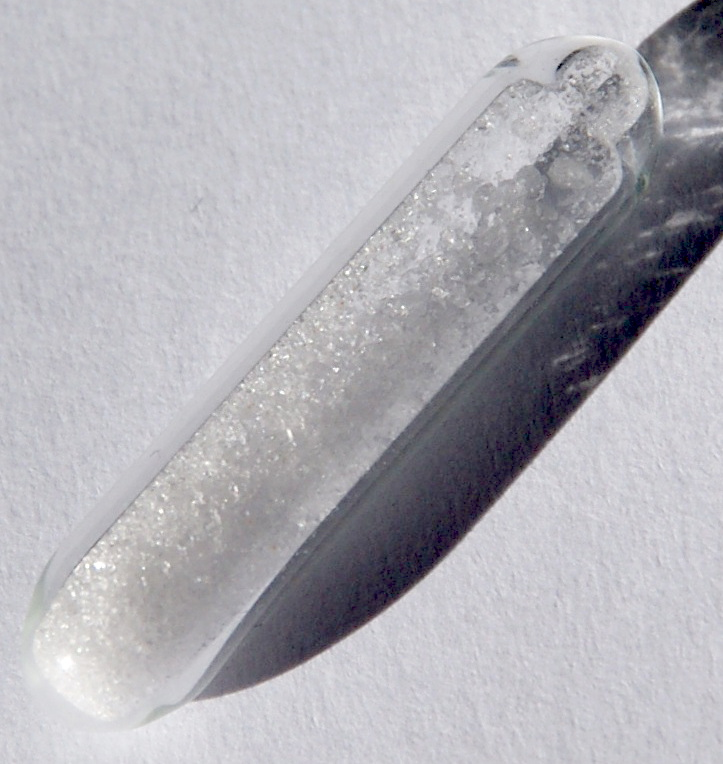
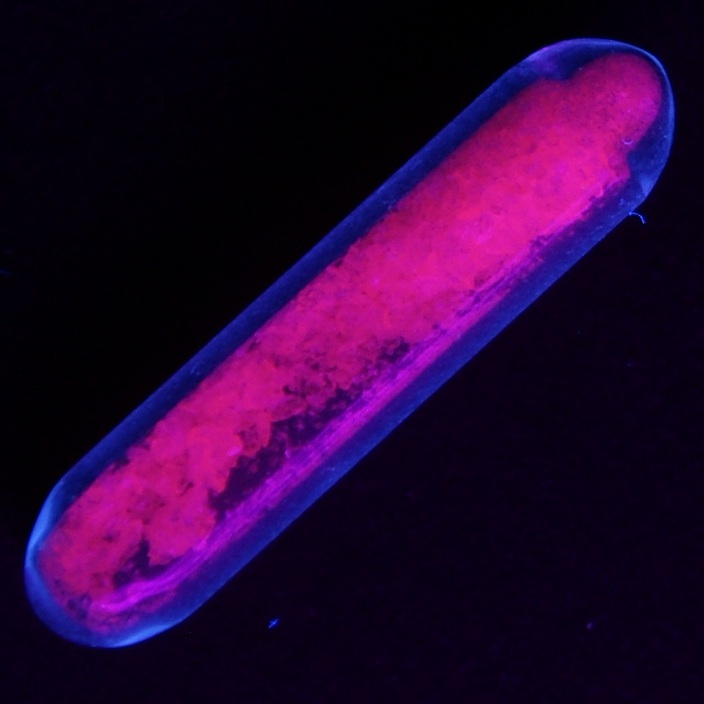
Europium(III) sulfate in ordinary light (left) and emitting red light under ultraviolet excitation (right)

Europium forms numerous salts of inorganic oxoacids, principally in the +3 oxidation state, including nitrates, sulfates, phosphates, carbonates and oxalates. In aqueous solution Eu(III) is strongly hydrated, and its chloride, sulfate and phosphate chemistry has been studied extensively because Eu(III) is frequently used as a chemical analogue for other trivalent lanthanides and actinides.

Europium(III) phosphate, EuPO_{4}, provides an example of the structural chemistry of Eu(III) oxosalts. Hydrated EuPO_{4}·nH_{2}O can precipitate in the hexagonal rhabdophane structure; after dehydration at temperatures above about 600 °C it transforms to monoclinic anhydrous EuPO_{4}, which is isostructural with monazite. Both forms show the characteristic line emission of Eu(III).

The +2 state gives several chemically distinctive salts. Europium(II) sulfate, EuSO_{4}, is sparingly soluble in water, in contrast with salts of the predominantly trivalent neighbouring lanthanides. Selective reduction of Eu(III) followed by precipitation of EuSO_{4} has therefore long been used to separate europium from rare-earth mixtures. Eu(II) salts are readily oxidised in air.

=== Coordination compounds ===
The coordination chemistry of europium is extensive in both the +3 and +2 oxidation states. Eu(III) is a hard Lewis acid that favours oxygen-donor ligands and usually adopts high coordination numbers; crystallographically characterised Eu(III) complexes span coordination numbers from six to twelve. Eu(II) is considerably larger and somewhat softer, and correspondingly shows a greater affinity for nitrogen, sulfur and other softer donor atoms.

Eu(III) complexes are particularly notable for their luminescence. After excitation, emission occurs principally from the long-lived ^{5}D_{0} level to the ^{7}F_{J} manifold, producing narrow orange and red bands. The relative strengths of these transitions depend on the symmetry and polarizability of the coordination environment, allowing Eu(III) emission spectra to act as sensitive probes of local structure. Because direct 4f–4f absorption is weak, many strongly luminescent complexes use organic ligands as light-harvesting groups: excitation energy absorbed by the ligand is transferred to Eu(III), a process commonly known as the antenna effect. This behaviour is prominent in europium β-diketonate, carboxylate and macrocyclic complexes.

Eu(II) complexes have different optical and redox properties. Their allowed 4f^{6}5d^{1} → 4f^{7} transitions generally produce broad emission bands that are much more sensitive to ligand environment than the narrow Eu(III) lines. The accessible Eu(III)/Eu(II) redox couple has also led to Eu(II) complexes being studied as reducing agents and as redox-responsive luminescent and magnetic systems.

=== Organometallic compounds ===
Organoeuropium compounds contain direct interactions between europium and carbon-based ligands. Europium is unusual among the lanthanides because the stability of Eu(II) permits an extensive chemistry of divalent organometallic compounds, particularly with cyclopentadienyl ligands. Bulky substituted cyclopentadienyl groups can stabilise discrete soluble metallocenes such as bis(pentamethylcyclopentadienyl)europium, Eu(C_{5}Me_{5})_{2}.

Divalent europium metallocenes participate in two broad classes of reaction: formation of Lewis acid–base adducts in which europium remains Eu(II), and one-electron reductions in which Eu(II) is oxidised to Eu(III). Other ligand systems give organoeuropium sandwich complexes with distinctive optical properties. Eu(II) complexes containing cyclononatetraenyl ligands, for example, can show blue-green luminescence whose energy differs substantially from that of conventional cyclopentadienyl europium complexes.

== Isotopes ==
Naturally occurring europium consists of two isotopes, ^{151}Eu and ^{153}Eu, in nearly equal proportions. Their standard isotopic abundances are 47.81% and 52.19%, respectively. ^{153}Eu is observationally stable, whereas ^{151}Eu is a primordial radioisotope. It undergoes alpha decay to ^{147}Pm with a measured half-life of 4.62×10^{18} years. This half-life is about 300 million times the age of the Universe, so the decay has a negligible effect on the natural isotopic composition of europium.

Artificial europium radioisotopes are known from ^{130}Eu through ^{170}Eu. The neutron-rich isotope ^{170}Eu, at the upper end of this range, was first experimentally characterised in 2022 and was measured to have a half-life of 197+74
−71 ms. The longest-lived artificial isotope is ^{150}Eu, with a half-life of 36.9 years. Other comparatively long-lived isotopes are ^{152}Eu (13.517 years), ^{154}Eu (8.592 years) and ^{155}Eu (4.742 years); all other known ground-state europium radioisotopes have half-lives shorter than 100 days.

Numerous nuclear isomers are also known. Among the longest-lived are ^{150m}Eu, with a half-life of 12.8 hours, and ^{152m1}Eu, with a half-life of 9.3116 hours; another isomer of ^{152}Eu at 147.9 keV has a half-life of about 96 minutes. Most neutron-deficient europium isotopes decay towards isotopes of samarium by electron capture or positron emission, whereas neutron-rich isotopes predominantly undergo beta minus decay towards isotopes of gadolinium. ^{152}Eu is unusual in lying close enough to the valley of stability to decay in both directions: about 72% of its decays proceed by electron capture or positron emission to ^{152}Sm, while about 28% proceed by beta decay to ^{152}Gd.

The naturally occurring isotopes have large neutron-capture cross sections, particularly ^{151}Eu, making natural europium an efficient absorber of slow neutrons. Thermal-neutron capture by ^{151}Eu produces both the ground and metastable states of ^{152}Eu, while capture by ^{153}Eu produces ^{154}Eu. Europium isotopes also occur among nuclear fission products, although europium lies in the low-yield, high-mass tail of the principal fission-fragment distribution.

The long-lived isotopes ^{152}Eu and ^{154}Eu emit numerous well-defined gamma rays and are used as standards for the energy calibration of gamma-ray spectrometers.

== History ==
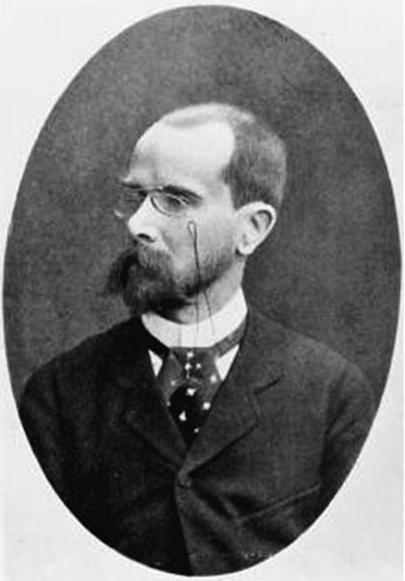
Eugène-Anatole Demarçay, who identified and named europium.

The discovery of europium was part of the prolonged separation of the rare-earth elements during the 19th century. Cerium had been discovered in 1803, and in the following decades apparently single rare-earth substances were repeatedly shown to contain further elements. Carl Gustaf Mosander separated lanthanum and didymium from cerium-containing material, while didymium itself was later resolved into praseodymium and neodymium. In 1879, Paul Émile Lecoq de Boisbaudran separated samarium from didymium, and samarium-rich material was subsequently found to contain gadolinium as well.

In 1885, William Crookes observed an anomalous line in the phosphorescence spectrum of material containing samarium and yttrium, indicating the presence of an unidentified constituent. In 1892, Lecoq de Boisbaudran reported an unidentified spectral line in samarium.

The French chemist Eugène-Anatole Demarçay investigated the material in greater detail. In 1896 he reported evidence for an unknown element associated with samarium, identified from its characteristic spectral lines. He gradually concentrated the new rare earth by repeated fractional crystallisation of double magnesium nitrate salts, monitoring the fractions spectroscopically. In 1901 he obtained material sufficiently pure to establish the element conclusively and named it europium, after Europe.

The optical properties of europium attracted attention during and immediately after its identification. Demarçay described sharp absorption lines of Eu(III) in solution in 1900. In 1904, Georges Urbain observed the faint pink appearance of crystals of europium(III) sulfate octahydrate, and in 1906 he reported the intense red luminescence of europium oxide dispersed in lime. In 1909 he described the cathodoluminescence of europium-doped gadolinium oxide, an early example of Eu(III) acting as a luminescent activator. Crookes also revisited the element in 1905, comparing the phosphorescent spectra of his earlier material with that of europium.

The unusual stability of Eu(II) also provided a useful means of separating europium from the other rare earths. Europium can be selectively reduced from Eu(III) to Eu(II) and then precipitated as sparingly soluble europium(II) sulfate, while the sulfates of the predominantly trivalent rare-earth elements remain in solution. In 1935, Herbert Newby McCoy described a method in which Eu(III) was reduced with amalgamated zinc and the resulting Eu(II) precipitated as the sulfate.

Metallic europium remained considerably more difficult to prepare than its salts. In 1937, Wilhelm Klemm and Heinrich Bommer prepared rare-earth metals, including europium, by reducing their chlorides with alkali metals and investigated their crystal structures and magnetic behaviour. Their measurements helped establish the unusually large atomic volume of metallic europium and its essentially divalent character.

Large-scale availability of europium increased during the mid-20th century as improved methods allowed the individual rare-earth elements to be separated in greater quantities. In 1964, Albert K. Levine and Frank C. Palilla reported europium-doped yttrium orthovanadate, YVO_{4}:Eu, as a highly efficient red-emitting cathodoluminescent phosphor for colour television. The commercialisation of colour television created a sudden increase in demand for europium and helped drive the expansion of rare-earth production at the Mountain Pass mine in California. By 1966, Mountain Pass had become the world's leading source of rare-earth elements.

== Occurrence ==
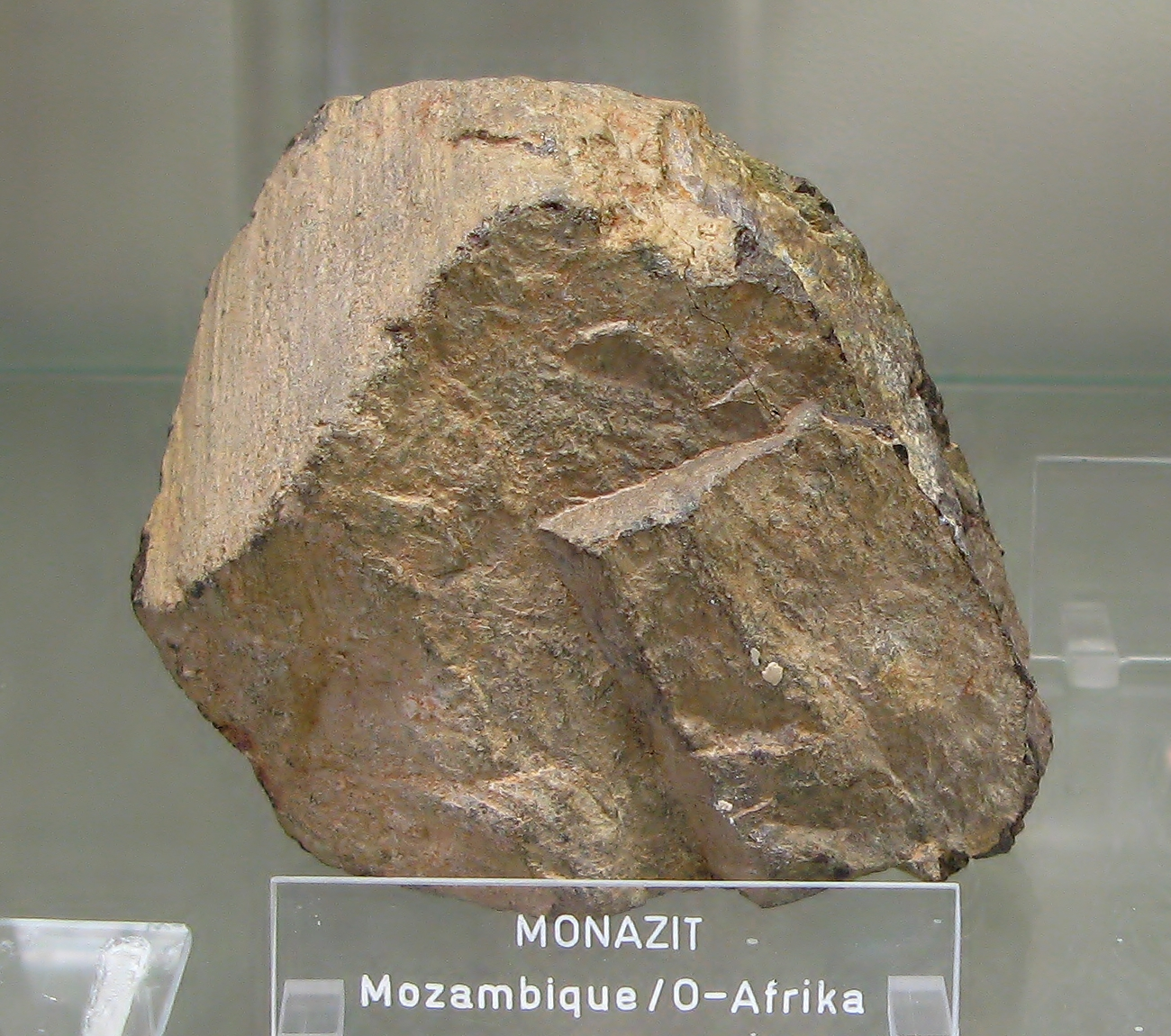
Monazite, one of the principal rare-earth minerals in which europium occurs

Europium does not occur naturally as the free metal. Like the other lanthanides, it is widely dispersed in minerals in which it substitutes for other rare-earth elements. Important rare-earth mineral sources containing europium include bastnäsite, monazite, xenotime and loparite-(Ce). Europium is normally only a minor constituent of these minerals; its average abundance in the Earth's crust is about 2 ppm. The chemical similarity of Eu(III) to the neighbouring trivalent lanthanides causes europium to accompany them during most geological and mineral-processing processes.

Europium differs geochemically from the other rare-earth elements because it can be reduced from Eu(III) to Eu(II) under suitable conditions. This produces the characteristic europium anomaly, in which the europium concentration of a mineral or rock deviates from the smooth trend expected between neighbouring rare-earth elements in a chondrite-normalised abundance pattern. Because Eu^{2+} is considerably larger than Eu^{3+} and is similar in size and charge to Ca^{2+} and Sr^{2+}, it can be incorporated preferentially into feldspar, particularly plagioclase.

As a result, plagioclase-rich minerals and cumulate rocks can display a positive europium anomaly, whereas melts from which substantial plagioclase has crystallised, and rocks derived from those melts, can show a negative anomaly. The size and sign of the anomaly therefore provide information about feldspar crystallisation and melting histories, although europium behaviour also depends on temperature, oxygen fugacity and the mineral assemblage involved. Europium anomalies are consequently widely used in petrology and geochemistry when interpreting the evolution of igneous rocks.

Trace amounts of Eu(II) also cause the intense blue fluorescence of some natural fluorite, CaF_{2}. Europium can substitute for Ca^{2+} in the fluorite lattice, and natural irradiation can favour conversion of Eu(III) impurities to luminescent Eu(II). In 1852, George Gabriel Stokes coined the term fluorescence while studying the luminescence of fluor-spar (fluorite).

Europium is also important in studies of cosmic element abundances. A large proportion of the europium in old, metal-poor stars is associated with rapid neutron-capture nucleosynthesis, and the abundance ratio [Eu/Fe] is commonly used as a measure of r-process enrichment. Europium-rich metal-poor stars therefore provide observational constraints on the astrophysical sites and history of heavy-element nucleosynthesis.

== Extraction ==
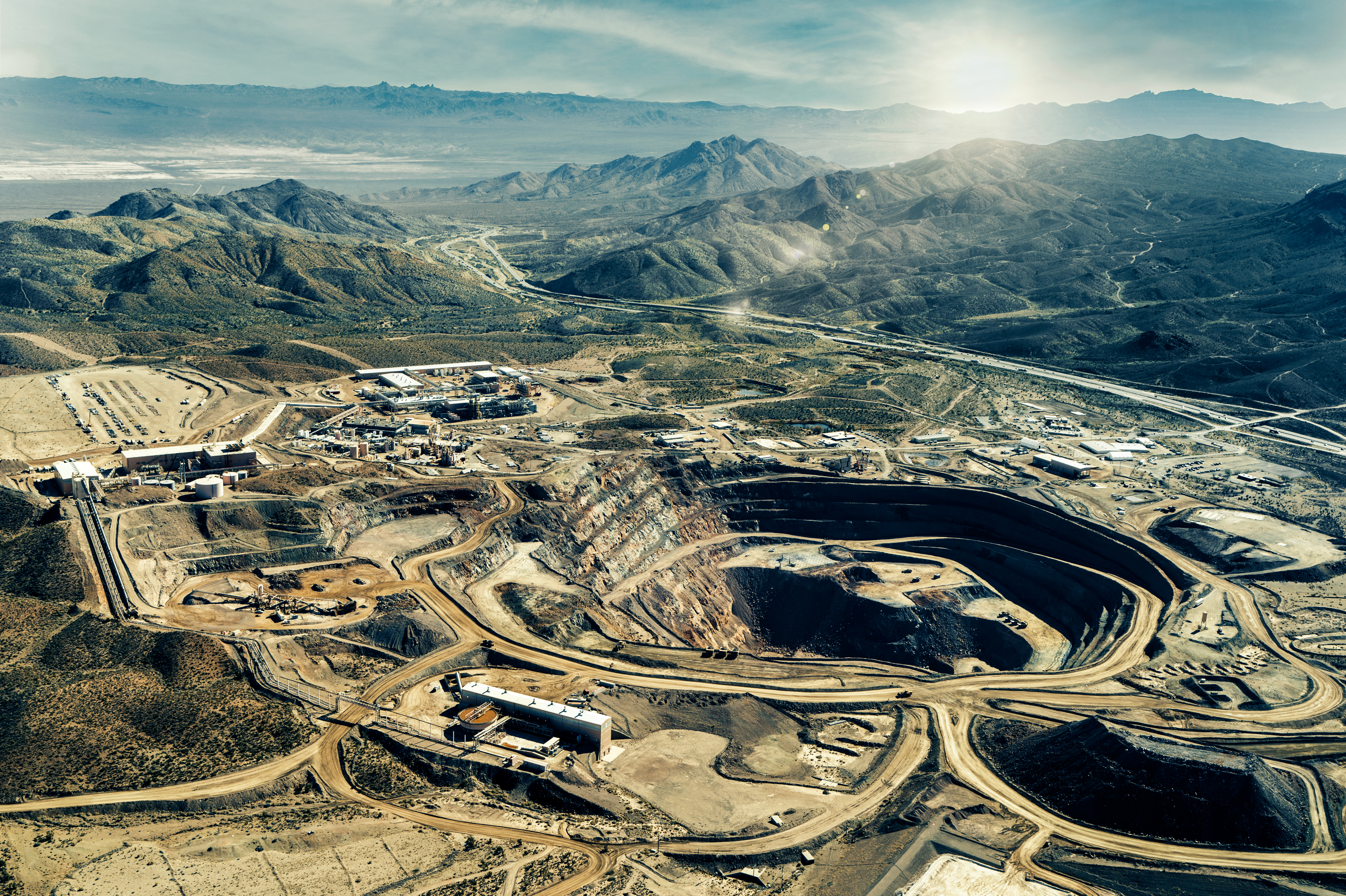
The Mountain Pass Rare Earth Mine and processing facility in California. A large-scale europium separation process using bastnäsite-derived feed from Mountain Pass was demonstrated by Molycorp in 1965.

Europium is obtained as a minor component of rare-earth ores rather than from a distinct europium mineral. The initial stages of its extraction are therefore shared with the other rare-earth elements. Minerals such as bastnäsite and monazite are first beneficiated, typically by flotation, gravity separation or magnetic separation, to produce a rare-earth concentrate. The concentrate is then chemically decomposed and leached, commonly with an inorganic acid, to transfer the rare-earth elements into solution. Because adjacent lanthanides have very similar chemical properties, commercial rare-earth processing generally uses multistage solvent extraction to divide the dissolved rare earths into fractions and ultimately separate individual elements.

Europium can be separated particularly effectively by exploiting the unusual accessibility of its +2 oxidation state. Eu(III) in a rare-earth solution can be selectively reduced to Eu(II), traditionally using metallic zinc or zinc amalgam. With zinc, the reduction can be represented as:

2 Eu^{3+} + Zn → 2 Eu^{2+} + Zn^{2+}

The resulting Eu^{2+} differs much more strongly in chemical behaviour from the remaining trivalent lanthanides than Eu^{3+} does. In a classical reduction–precipitation process, sulfate ions are added after reduction, causing the sparingly soluble europium(II) sulfate, EuSO_{4}, to precipitate while most other rare-earth sulfates remain in solution:

Eu^{2+} + SO^{2−}_{4} → EuSO_{4}(v)

Because Eu(II) is readily oxidised by air, the precipitation is normally carried out under a non-oxidising atmosphere. Electrochemical and photochemical reduction of Eu(III) have also been investigated as alternatives to chemical reducing agents.

Selective reduction can also be combined with solvent extraction. Acidic organophosphorus extractants such as bis(2-ethylhexyl)phosphoric acid (D2EHPA) extract trivalent rare-earth ions much more strongly than Eu(II). After europium has been reduced, the remaining trivalent rare earths can therefore be transferred preferentially into the organic phase while Eu(II) remains in the aqueous phase. Reduction–solvent-extraction and reduction–precipitation methods can also be combined with ion-exchange or additional solvent-extraction stages when greater purity is required.

A large-scale example was demonstrated by Molycorp in 1965 using bastnäsite-derived rare-earth chloride feed from Mountain Pass. The feed contained only about 0.1% Eu_{2}O_{3}; solvent extraction with D2EHPA first enriched the europium to approximately 15%. In the subsequent process, europium-bearing solution was further purified by solvent extraction, Eu(III) was reduced to Eu(II) with zinc amalgam, and sulfuric acid was added to precipitate EuSO_{4}. Calcination of the precipitate ultimately produced Eu_{2}O_{3} of approximately 99.99% purity. The preparation of elemental europium from purified europium compounds is treated separately under production.

== Production ==
Published production statistics for europium are limited because it is recovered as a minor component of mixed rare-earth production rather than mined separately. European Commission estimates placed average global production of europium oxide at about 422 tonnes per year in 2012–2016. China accounted for approximately 86% of this production, followed by Australia at 6%, the United States and Russia at about 2% each, and other countries for the remainder. More recent estimates of primary europium production are derived from total rare-earth mine output and the estimated europium content of individual deposits; separate public statistics for refined or processed europium production are not available.

After europium has been separated from the other rare-earth elements, it is commonly obtained as high-purity europium(III) oxide, Eu_{2}O_{3}. Preparation of the elemental metal is more difficult. Europium, like samarium and ytterbium, has a comparatively high vapour pressure at elevated temperature, allowing the metal to be produced by metallothermic reduction coupled with vacuum distillation. In an established process, Eu_{2}O_{3} is heated with metallic lanthanum under high vacuum:

Eu_{2}O_{3} + 2 La → 2 Eu + La_{2}O_{3}

The reaction is carried out in refractory apparatus, commonly using tantalum, at approximately 1100–1200 °C. The europium produced is considerably more volatile than the lanthanum reductant and lanthanum oxide product, so it distils from the reaction zone and condenses in a cooler part of the apparatus. Reduction and distillation therefore occur simultaneously, helping to separate europium from less volatile contaminants. In 1958, Frank Spedding, J. J. Hanak and A. H. Daane reported preparing 70.4 g of high-purity europium by heating europium oxide with lanthanum in vacuum at about 1200 °C.

The same reduction–distillation principle is used for preparing high-purity europium. Because of its volatility, the metal can subsequently be purified by further vacuum distillation or sublimation. Ultra-high-vacuum distillation has been shown to reduce most metallic and non-metallic impurities to trace concentrations.

Molten-salt electrochemical methods have also been investigated for the production and recovery of europium, but direct electrodeposition of the metal is complicated by the stability of Eu(II). In chloride melts Eu(III) is reduced first to Eu(II), whereas reduction of Eu(II) to Eu metal occurs only at substantially more negative potentials. In molten fluoride systems, direct deposition onto an inert electrode is similarly difficult; reactive copper cathodes or co-deposition with aluminium can instead recover europium in Eu–Cu or Eu–Al alloys.

== Applications ==
=== Phosphors and luminescence ===
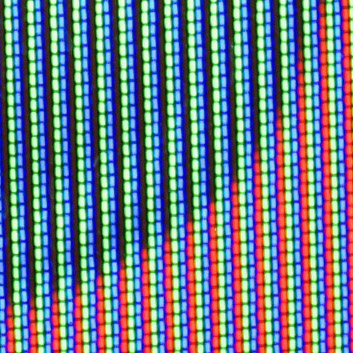
Europium phosphors were historically important for producing red light in cathode-ray tube colour displays.

One of the first major commercial applications of europium was in red phosphors for colour television. Europium-doped yttrium orthovanadate, YVO_{4}:Eu, introduced during the 1960s, provided an efficient and highly saturated red component for cathode-ray tube displays. Europium-activated yttrium oxide, Y_{2}O_{3}:Eu, and yttrium oxysulfide, Y_{2}O_{2}S:Eu, were subsequently widely used as red-emitting phosphors in television and computer CRTs. The resulting demand for europium was an important stimulus to the expansion of rare-earth production, particularly at the Mountain Pass mine in California. The importance of CRT phosphors later declined sharply as cathode-ray displays were replaced by flat-panel technologies.

Europium-containing phosphors have also been important in electric lighting. In traditional three-band fluorescent lamps, Eu(III)-activated materials provide red emission while Eu(II)-activated phosphors provide blue emission; together with a green-emitting phosphor, these produce white light with improved colour rendering. Europium phosphors remain important in light-emitting diode technology. Eu(II)-activated materials are particularly useful because the energy of their broad 4f–5d emission bands depends strongly on the host lattice, allowing their emission colour to be tuned over much of the visible spectrum. Eu(III)-activated phosphors are likewise used and developed as narrow-band red emitters for phosphor-converted white LEDs and display backlighting.

Europium is also an important activator in persistent phosphors, which continue to emit after excitation has ceased. A prominent example is Eu(II)- and Dy(III)-doped strontium aluminate, SrAl_{2}O_{4}:Eu,Dy, which produces intense green persistent luminescence lasting for many hours. It largely replaced older copper-doped zinc sulfide phosphors in applications including emergency signage, watch dials, markings and glow-in-the-dark products. Europium-containing persistent phosphors have also been investigated for stress sensing, optical information storage and biomedical imaging.

Eu(II) is used as an activator in storage phosphors for computed radiography. In materials such as BaFBr:Eu^{2+} and CsBr:Eu^{2+}, absorbed X-ray energy is stored in crystal defects and subsequently released as visible light when the imaging plate is scanned with a laser. BaFBr:Eu^{2+} became an important commercial storage phosphor for medical radiography, while CsBr:Eu^{2+} has been used in needle-structured imaging plates with improved spatial resolution.

Europium-doped materials are also used or investigated as scintillators for ionising-radiation detection. Eu(II)-doped strontium iodide, SrI_{2}:Eu, has a high light yield and good energy resolution for gamma-ray spectroscopy, while lacking the intrinsic radioactive background present in some competing rare-earth scintillators.

Luminescent Eu(III) complexes have additionally been investigated as red emitters in organic light-emitting diodes. Their narrow emission bands, particularly the strong ^{5}D_{0} → ^{7}F_{2} transition near 612 nm, can produce highly saturated red electroluminescence. Device performance is influenced by the efficiency of charge transport and energy transfer to the europium centre, as well as by the stability of the complexes.

=== Other applications ===
The characteristic emission spectra of europium compounds are useful in anti-counterfeiting and authentication materials. Eu(III)-containing phosphors and complexes produce narrow red emission lines whose positions and splitting patterns provide characteristic optical signatures. Lanthanide-containing inks and phosphors are therefore used or investigated for banknotes, identity documents and security labels. Red-emitting features on euro banknotes show the characteristic ^{5}D_{0} → ^{7}F_{J} emission pattern of Eu(III), although the exact formulations of the security materials are not publicly disclosed.

Europium chelates are widely used as luminescent labels in biochemical analysis. The unusually long excited-state lifetimes of Eu(III) complexes permit time-resolved fluorescence measurements in which detection is delayed until much of the short-lived background fluorescence from biological material has decayed, substantially improving the signal-to-background ratio. Europium-labelled antibodies and other biomolecules are used in sensitive immunoassays and high-throughput biochemical assays, including drug-screening applications. Europium complexes are also used in time-resolved Förster resonance energy transfer assays for monitoring interactions between biomolecules.

Europium(III) complexes have also been used as NMR shift reagents. Paramagnetic complexes such as Eu(fod)_{3} coordinate reversibly to suitable organic molecules and alter nearby NMR chemical shifts, allowing otherwise overlapping resonances to be separated. Chiral europium complexes such as Eu(hfc)_{3} can give different induced shifts for a pair of enantiomers and have been used to determine enantiomeric composition and assist stereochemical assignments. Such lanthanide shift reagents are now used more selectively than during the early development of high-resolution NMR spectroscopy.

Europium compounds have also been used as neutron-absorbing control materials because several europium isotopes have large neutron-capture cross sections. Europium(III) oxide has been incorporated into stainless-steel-based absorber materials, and Eu_{2}O_{3}–stainless-steel control elements were used successfully in the SM-1 and SM-1A pressurised-water reactors. One advantage of europium absorbers is that successive neutron captures form additional europium and gadolinium nuclides that can themselves absorb neutrons, so the absorber retains useful reactivity worth during irradiation.

== Precautions ==
Europium
Hazards
- GHS labelling
Pictograms	(GHS02: Flammable)
Signal word	Danger
Hazard statements	H250
Precautionary statements	P210, P222, P231+P232, P233, P280, P370+P378
NFPA 704 (fire diamond)	0 3 1 W
Safety data sheet (SDS)	https://www.sigmaaldrich.com/US/en/sds/aldrich/261092

Europium has no known biological role. Toxicological information specific to europium remains comparatively limited. More generally, reviews of the rare-earth elements have noted substantial gaps in knowledge of their long-term health effects, with most toxicological research concentrated on a few elements such as cerium and lanthanum and little epidemiological evidence from occupationally exposed populations.

Studies in rats indicate low systemic availability following oral administration of europium(III) chloride, although sufficiently high doses can produce adverse effects. In a 28-day study, rats were given europium(III) chloride hexahydrate at doses of up to 1000 mg/kg of body weight per day. At the highest dose, gastric irritation and changes in several biochemical measurements were observed, while europium concentrations increased in the liver, kidneys, spleen and bone. The authors reported a no-observed-effect level of 200 mg/kg/day. A separate study of single oral doses of europium(III) chloride in rats found low concentrations of europium in the blood and low fractional urinary excretion, but detected dose-dependent changes in several markers of renal function. The toxicity and bioavailability of europium also depend on its chemical speciation and exposure conditions.

Elemental europium presents a more immediate hazard because of its chemical reactivity. Commercial europium metal is classified as a category 1 pyrophoric solid under the Globally Harmonized System of Classification and Labelling of Chemicals, with the hazard statement H250: it may ignite spontaneously on exposure to air. It is therefore stored protected from air, commonly under oil or an inert atmosphere. The safety data sheet also states that europium reacts violently with water and specifies dry powder as a suitable extinguishing medium for fires involving the metal.
