= Carolinum =

Carolinum may refer to:

- Carolinum, Zürich, the former Prophezei or Prophezey of the Grossmünster priory in Zürich in Switzerland
- Carolinum, the oldest name of Charles University in Prague, Czech Republic
  - Karolinum, the main historical building of Charles University

== See also ==
Carolinium
