= Nils Johan Berlin =

Swedish chemist and physician

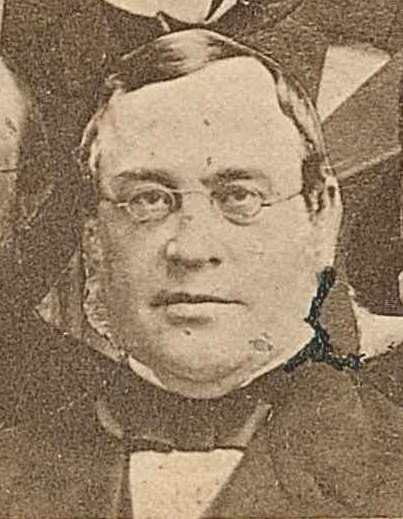
- Born: 18 February 1812; Härnösand, Ångermanland, Sweden
- Died: 27 December 1891 (aged 79); Stockholm, Sweden
- Education: University of Uppsala
- Scientific career
- Fields: chemistry and medicine
- Workplaces: University of Lund
- Doctoral advisor: Jöns Jacob Berzelius

Nils Johan Berlin (Nils Johannes Berlin) (18 February 1812 – 27 December 1891) was a Swedish chemist and physician, who held various professorships at the University of Lund from 1843 to 1864. Berlin was the first chemist who took the initiative to write a textbook on elementary science, the purpose being to provide basic science education for the general public.

His chemistry research emphasized the study of minerals, especially the newly-discovered rare earths, having devised means of separating yttrium and erbium. The mineral berlinite (a type of aluminium phosphate) is named after him. Berlin became a member of the Royal Swedish Academy of Sciences in 1844.

== Education ==
Berlin graduated from the University of Uppsala with a doctor of philosophy in 1833, having studied under the tutelage of Jöns Jacob Berzelius. He completed a doctor of medicine degree in 1837, also at the University of Uppsala.

== Academic career ==
Berlin held a number of faculty positions at the University of Lund, beginning in 1843 as a professor of pharmacology. Subsequently he also became a professor of chemistry and mineralogy in 1847, then rector of the university, 1854-1855, and lastly professor of medical and physiological chemistry in 1862. He served as the Director of the National Board of Hygiene (Sundhetskollegiet) beginning in 1864.

== Elementary science textbooks ==
Berlin was the first chemist to write a textbook for elementary science for the general population. Berlin published two popular textbooks, which emphasized description and practical knowledge over theory (of which there was relatively little at the time). Vext-chemien i sammandrag was published in 1835, and Elementar-lärobok i oorganisk kemi first appeared in 1857. It went through 15 editions, selling more than 450,000 copies. His textbooks helped to catalyze the teaching of science in elementary schools. They received praise and an award from the Swedish parliament, and were translated into German and Finnish. The third edition of Berlin's textbook, which appeared in 1870, was heavily revised by Christian Wilhelm Blomstrand, who added his own systematization of the elements.

Berlin's father was a vicar. Berlin himself stated in his will that "Science and the thorough testing of its problems and results has never given me reason to doubt the truths of religion". As a scientist, and as a popularizer of science, Berlin situated scientific knowledge securely on a religious basis. This may have been an advantage when selling elementary science textbooks, since pastors often led the local school boards that chose the textbooks for their schools.

== Research on rare earth elements ==
In 1787 Carl Axel Arrhenius found a dark mineral in a feldspar mine in the village of Ytterby, Sweden. He sent a sample of this ytterbite to Johan Gadolin for further analysis. A number of researchers tried to identify elements composing the ore, which were particularly hard to separate due to their similar chemical properties. As a group, they were given the misnomer rare-earth elements. (In fact, they are not rare, just difficult to extract.) Individually, they were discovered and named by various scientists, often using variants based on the word "Ytterby".

The first two ores to be derived were called ceria and yttria. In the 1830s and 40s, Carl Gustav Mosander derived several substances from these known ores. In 1843 Mosander was able to extract three metal oxides from ytteria, a whitish "earth" which he called pure ytteria, a pink or rose-colored oxide which he called terbia, and a yellowish peroxide which he called erbia. Mosander was rightfully uncertain of their purity; they did however contain the elements yttrium, erbium, and terbium.

Like scientists before him such as Mosander and Arrhenius, Berlin also worked on separation of ytteria ore into its constituent compounds. In 1860, Berlin successfully reported the identification of two substances, yttrium, and a pink salt which Berlin named erbium. Subsequent chemists followed Berlin's designation rather than Mosander's. The naming of ytteria's components became further complicated in 1862, when Marc Delafontaine reported its separation into yttrium and a yellow peroxide, which he first called mosandrum (after Mosander) and later terbium. In this way, the names originally given to erbium and terbium became switched.
