= Deerbrook, Mississippi =

Unincorporated community in Mississippi, US

Deerbrook
- Unincorporated community
- Location within the state of Mississippi
- Coordinates: 33°14′07″N 88°29′12″W
- Country: United States
- State: Mississippi
- County: Noxubee
- Elevation: 262 ft (80 m)
- Time zone: UTC-6 (Central (CST))
  - Summer (DST): UTC-5 (CDT)
- GNIS feature ID: 669207

Deerbrook is an unincorporated community in Noxubee County, in the U.S. state of Mississippi.

== History ==
A post office was established as "Deer Brook" in 1842. The name was changed to "Deerbrook" in 1856, and the post office was discontinued in 1942.

Deerbrook had a population of 66 by 1900. The settlement was described as having "two stores, and a fine cotton gin."

== Notable people ==
Chemist Charles Baskerville was born in Deerbrook.
