= Europium(III) sulfate =

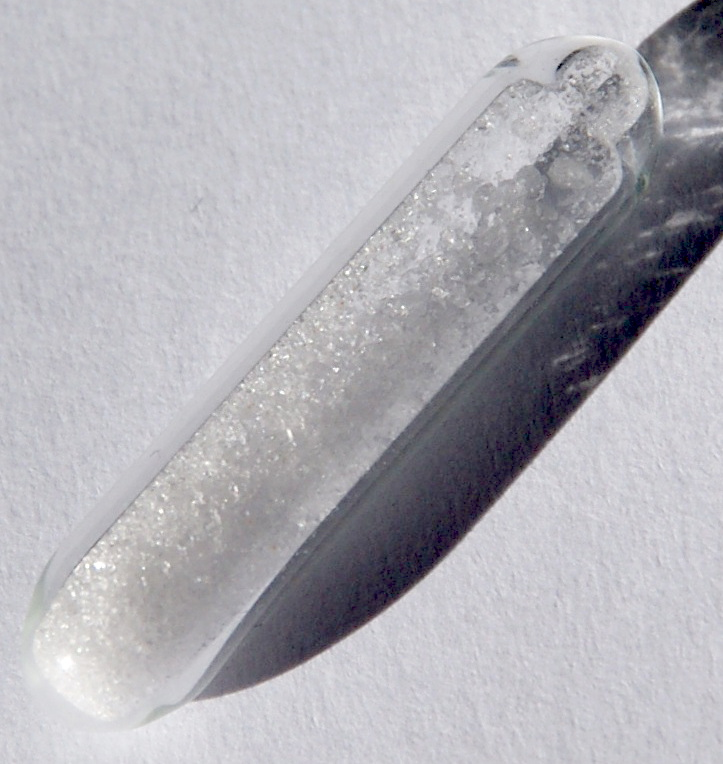

Names
- IUPAC name Europium(III) sulfate
- Other names: Dieuropium(3+) trisulphate; Europic sulfate

Identifiers
| CAS Number | 13537-15-0; octahydrate: 10031-55-7 |
| 3D model (JSmol) | Interactive image; octahydrate: Interactive image |
| ChemSpider | 8005731; octahydrate: 21241401 |
| ECHA InfoCard | 100.033.534 |
| EC Number | 236-903-3; octahydrate: 680-960-0 |
| PubChem CID | 9829996; octahydrate: 25021676 |
| CompTox Dashboard (EPA) | DTXSID40928976; octahydrate: DTXSID60648467 |
- InChI: InChI=1S/2Eu.3H2O4S/c;;3*1-5(2,3)4/h;;3*(H2,1,2,3,4)/q2*+3;;;/p-6 Key: FBUHTUYBHREGEH-UHFFFAOYSA-H; octahydrate: InChI=1S/2Eu.3H2O4S.8H2O/c;;3*1-5(2,3)4;;;;;;;;/h;;3*(H2,1,2,3,4);8*1H2/q2*+3;;;;;;;;;;;/p-6 Key: PGDXJFDXKJLVTJ-UHFFFAOYSA-H
- SMILES: [O-]S(=O)(=O)[O-].[O-]S(=O)(=O)[O-].[O-]S(=O)(=O)[O-].[Eu+3].[Eu+3]; octahydrate: O.O.O.O.O.O.O.O.[O-]S(=O)(=O)[O-].[O-]S(=O)(=O)[O-].[O-]S(=O)(=O)[O-].[Eu+3].[Eu+3]

Properties
| Chemical formula | Eu_{2}(SO_{4})_{3} |
| Molar mass | 592.10 g·mol^{−1} |
| Appearance | light pink (anhydrous) white (octahydrate) |
| Density | 4.99 g/cm^{3} |
| Solubility in water | 0.021 g/mL (20°C) |

Structure
| Crystal structure | monoclinic |
| Space group | C2/c |
| Lattice constant | a = 21.2787 Å, b = 6.6322 Å, c = 6.8334 Å |

Hazards
- GHS labelling
| Pictograms | (GHS07: Exclamation mark) |
| Signal word | Warning |
| Hazard statements | H315, H319, H335 |
| Precautionary statements | P261, P264, P264+P265, P271, P280, P302+P352, P304+P340, P305+P351+P338, P319, P321, P332+P317, P337+P317, P362+P364, P403+P233, P405, P501 |
- Except where otherwise noted, data are given for materials in their standard state (at 25 °C [77 °F], 100 kPa). Infobox references

Europium(III) sulfate is a europium compound with the chemical formula Eu_{2}(SO_{4})_{3}·nH_{2}O (n = 0, 1, 4, or 8). It is a light pink crystalline solid, stable in air up to 670 °C. The octahydrate dehydrates to the anhydrous form at 375 °C.

== Preparation ==
Europium(III) sulfate can be prepared by reacting europium(III) oxide with sulfuric acid:

Eu_{2}O_{3} + 3 H_{2}SO_{4} → Eu_{2}(SO_{4})_{3} + 3 H_{2}O

It can also be precipitated from a solution of europium(III) nitrate upon the addition of sulfuric acid:

2 Eu(NO_{3})_{3} + 3 H_{2}SO_{4} → Eu_{2}(SO_{4})_{3} + 6 HNO_{3}

== Reactions ==
Europium(III) sulfate can be reduced to europium(II) sulfate with hydrogen gas at 480-500 °C. At temperatures between 600-1000 °C an oxysulfide (Eu_{2}O_{2}S) forms instead.
