= Eugène-Anatole Demarçay =

French chemist

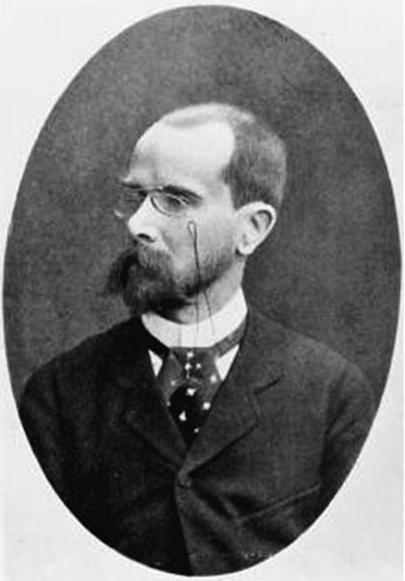
- Eugène-Anatole Demarçay
- Born: 1 January 1852; Paris
- Died: 5 March 1903 (aged 51); Paris
- Known for: Spectrum; Discovering the element europium
- Scientific career
- Fields: Chemist

Eugène-Anatole Demarçay (1 January 1852 – 5 March 1903) was a French chemist who designed an apparatus to produce a spark using an induction coil and used it to generate the spectra of rare earth elements which he examined using spectroscopy, thus detecting the element europium in 1896, and isolated it as the oxide europia in 1901. He helped Marie Curie to confirm the existence of another new element, radium, in 1898.

== Education ==
Eugène-Anatole Demarçay was born to Camille Demarçay (1815–1893) and Cécile Lainé (1829–1916) at 152 boulevard Haussman, Paris. His grandfather Marc-Jean Demarçay (1772–1839) had been a general in the French Revolution. Demarçay studied at the Lycée Condorcet, spent time in England, and in 1870 entered the École Polytechnique in Palaiseau near Paris. Demarçay studied under Jean Baptiste Dumas (1800–1884) and served for several years as an assistant to Auguste André Thomas Cahours at the École Polytechnique.

In 1876, he studied acetylacetonates in the laboratory of Cahours. He spent some years travelling to Egypt and India. In 1880 he completed his dissertation, Sur les acides tétrique et oxytétrique et leurs homologues ("On tetric and oxytetric acids and their counterparts" Gauthier-Villars, 1880). Some of his early organic chemistry researches into terpenes and ether were important for the perfume industry.

== Career ==
Demarçay's interests moved from organic chemistry to organometallics and then to inorganic chemistry. He applied for a professorial position at the Académie des Sciences in 1878, but was not accepted.

He became particularly interested in studying nitrogen sulfides, publishing three papers in 1880–1881. These compounds appear stable at room temperature, but are sensitive to heat, friction, and shock, and are likely to explode when heated. During an experiment with nitrogen and sulfur, a cast-iron vessel exploded and destroyed the sight in one of his eyes.

He established his own private laboratory at 2 Boulevard Berthier, Paris. In 1881–1882, he developed a vacuum system to control temperature during experiments. 1.5 metres high, it consisted of 3 concentric vessels and a compressor driven by a six horsepower gas engine. Temperature in the center vessel could be reduced to −85 °C. Demarçay used this to study the volatility of substances such as zinc, cadmium, and gold at low temperatures.

Demarçay became a specialist in reading the line patterns of spectroscopy. He developed new techniques for the identification of spectra from rare earth metals. He developed an instrument for obtaining spectra, using an induction coil with pure platinum electrodes to produce a high spark temperature that eliminated impurities that could cause foreign spectral lines. By eliminating sources of error, he made it possible to separate out purer samples of various rare earths than had previously been available.

In 1896, he suspected that samples of the recently discovered element samarium were contaminated with another unknown element, predicting that it would be located between samarium and gadolinium. To obtain pure enough samples, he developed a new separation technique involving crystallization of double magnesium nitrate salts. By 1901, he had isolated samples of sufficient purity to confirm the isolation of europium.

In 1898, using his skills of spectroscopy, he helped Marie and Pierre Curie confirm the isolation of a new element, radium. After extracting polonium from pitchblende they observed that the remaining sample was still radioactive. They consulted Demarçay, who reported a line in the spectrograph indicative of a new element.

== Awards ==
- 1881, Jecker Prix, Section de Chimie de l'Académie des Sciences for contributions to organic chemistry

== Family ==
On 14 November 1889 Demarçay married Jeanne Berard (1865–1933) at the Temple du St. Esprit, Paris, in a Protestant wedding. His granddaughter, Joseph de Carayon Talpayrac, was alive in Paris in 2003.

Eugène-Anatole Demarçay died 5 March 1903, at his home at 80 Boulevard Malesherbes, Paris. His brother Jean became executor of his estate, and offered the state of the art equipment from his laboratory to Pierre Curie. Curie eventually arranged for it to be given to rare earths researcher Georges Urbain.

== Publications ==
- Spectres électriques. Atlas; Eugène Demarçay; Paris : Gauthier-Villars, 1895. OCLC 54317437
- Sur les acides tétrique et oxytétrique et leurs homologues; Eugène Demarçay; Paris : Gauthier-Villars, 1880. OCLC 25644291
