= Charles Baskerville (painter) =

American painter

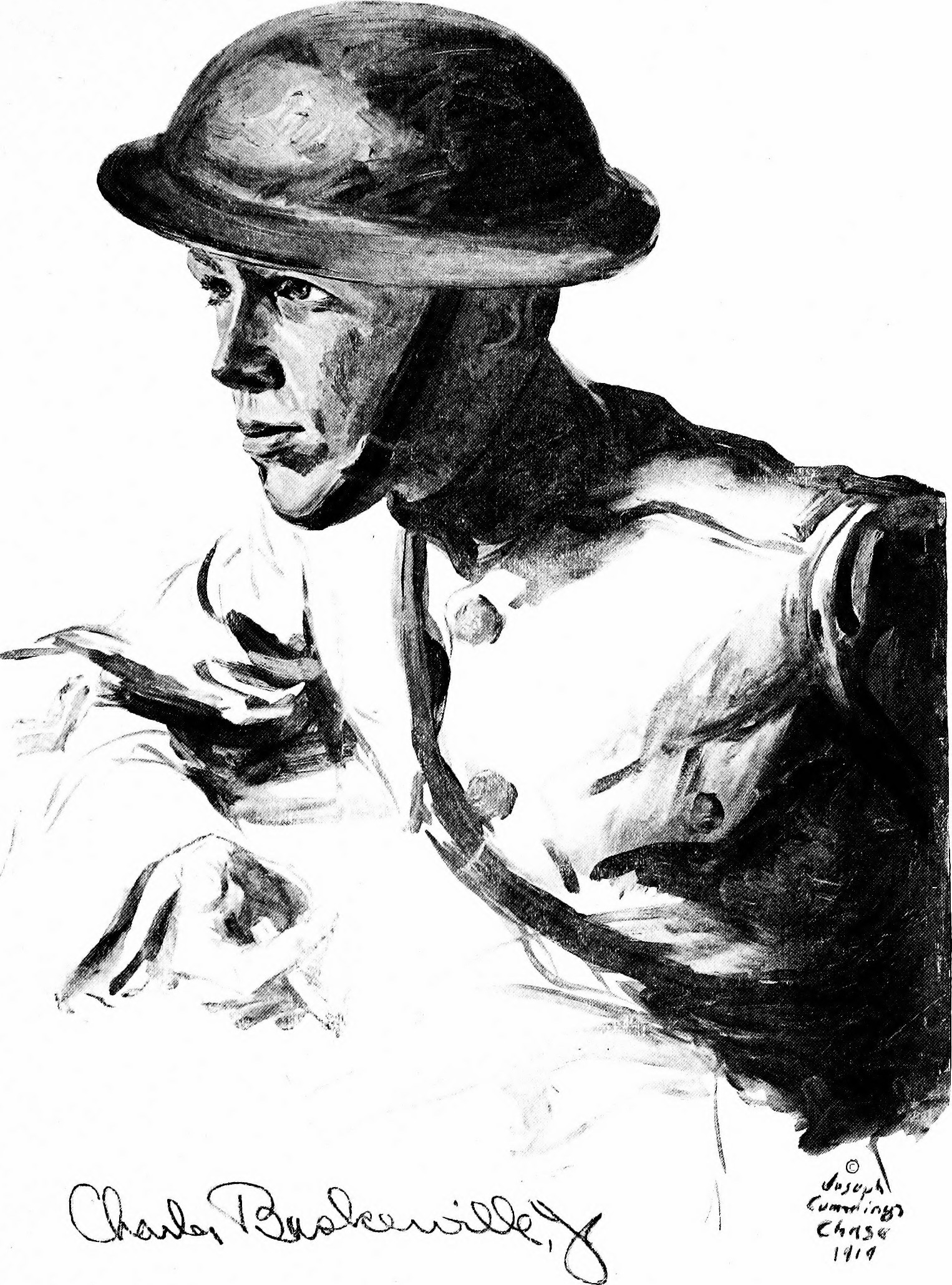
- Charles Baskerville in World War I
- Born: 16 April 1896; Raleigh
- Died: 20 November 1994; New York City
- Occupations: Painter, muralist

Charles Baskerville, Jr (16 April 1896 – 20 November 1994) was an American artist.

Baskerville was born in Raleigh, North Carolina, the son of Charles Baskerville and Mary Boylan Snow. He moved to New York with his family. He later studied at Cornell University, where he was the art director for the university yearbook and The Cornell University Widow, a satire magazine. His studies were interrupted by World War I, in which he served as a lieutenant in the Rainbow Division and earned a Silver Star for gallantry. While convalescing from a wound, he made sketches of his fellow soldiers; some of these sketches were published in Scribner's Magazine.

After the war, he returned to Cornell, where he joined Delta Kappa Epsilon fraternity. He graduated in 1919. He wrote a popular nightclub column for The New Yorker under the pseudonym of "Top Hat", while also working as a portrait painter. His art career was again interrupted, this time by World War II, in which he served as a lieutenant colonel in the US Army Air Force; he was the Air Force's official portrait painter and was awarded the Legion of Merit by General Henry H. Arnold.

He is described as "an old-school portrait painter... [who] never owned a camera in his life". Among the subjects of his portraits were Jawaharlal Nehru, Bernard Baruch, William S. Paley, Wallis Simpson, Cornelius Vanderbilt Whitney, Paul Mellon, Richard Rodgers, and Helen Hayes. He once trekked through the Himalayas, by foot and pony, to paint a portrait of the King of Nepal. Apart from portraits, he also painted murals, one of which is in the conference room of the Joint Committee on Military Affairs of the United States Congress. He died in 1994, at the age of 98, in Manhattan.

== Bibliography ==
- Tophat (April 18, 1925). "Around the clock". The New Yorker. Vol. 1, no. 9. p. 18.
- — (April 25, 1925). "When nights are bold". The New Yorker. Vol. 1, no. 10. p. 18.
- — (May 2, 1925). "When nights are bold". The New Yorker. Vol. 1, no. 11. p. 18.
- — (May 9, 1925). "When nights are bold". The New Yorker. Vol. 1, no. 12. p. 18.
- — (May 16, 1925). "When nights are bold". The New Yorker. Vol. 1, no. 13. p. 18.
- Top Hat (June 6, 1925). "When nights are bold". The New Yorker. Vol. 1, no. 16. p. 20.
