= Marc Delafontaine =

Swiss chemist (1838–1911)

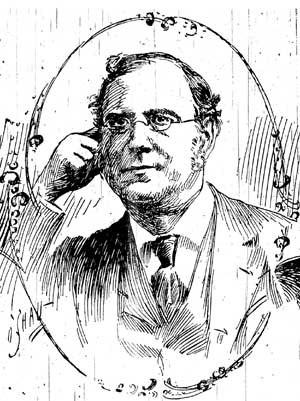
- Born: March 31, 1837 or 1838; Céligny, Switzerland
- Died: May 21, 1911; Chicago, Illinois, USA
- Resting place: Forest Home Cemetery (Forest Park)
- Education: University of Geneva
- Known for: holmium
- Scientific career
- Workplaces: University of Geneva

Marc Delafontaine (1837, or 31 March 1838, Céligny, Switzerland (Note: Poggendorff's Biographisch-Literarisches Handwörterbuch, Verlag von Johan Ambrosius Barth, Leipzig, 1898, p. 344 gives his birth date as 31 March 1838, while Mary Elvira Weeks Discovery of the Elements, 7. ed., Journal of Chemical Education: Easton, Pennsylvania, 1968, p. 677 stated birth year is 1837.)–1911 (Note: Fontani op. cit. p. 125 says that no documents exist to report his death but it is assumed Delafontaine passed away in 1911.)) was a Swiss chemist and spectroscopist who was involved in discovering and investigating some of the rare earth elements.

== Career ==
Delafontaine studied with Jean Charles Galissard de Marignac at the University of Geneva. He also worked at the University of Geneva.

Delafontaine moved to the United States of America, arriving in New York in 1870, and later becoming a naturalized citizen. He taught in Chicago, Illinois at city high schools, and at a women's college. He also worked as an analytical chemist with the Chicago Police Department.

== Research ==
=== Holmium ===
In 1878, along with Jacques-Louis Soret, Delafontaine first observed holmium spectroscopically. In 1879, Per Teodor Cleve chemically separated it from thulium and erbium. All three men are given credit for the element's discovery.

=== Yttrium, terbium and erbium ===
In 1843, Carl Gustaf Mosander discovered terbium and erbium as components of yttria. However, this discovery was hotly contested. Spectroscopist Nils Johan Berlin denied that the two elements existed, failing to confirm the existence of "erbia" and suggesting that its name be applied to "terbia".

In 1864, Marc Delafontaine used optical spectroscopy to conclusively prove that yttrium, terbium, and erbium were separate elements. Ironically, however, the confusion that had been introduced between the names continued. Mosander's proposed names were switched, giving the amethyst compound the name "erbium" oxide and the yellow substance the name "terbium" oxide, instead of the other way around as originally proposed.
