= Victorium =

Proposed chemical element

Victorium, originally named monium, is a mixture of gadolinium and terbium. In 1898, English chemist William Crookes reported his discovery of it in his inaugural address as president of the British Association for the Advancement of Science. He identified the new substance, based on an analysis of the unique phosphorescence and other ultraviolet-visible spectral phenomena, as a new chemical element, although this was later shown to be false. The name monium means "alone", because its spectral lines stood alone at the end of the ultraviolet spectrum. In 1899 Crookes renamed the purported element "victorium" in honor of Queen Victoria's recent diamond jubilee. He assigned it the symbol Vc. By 1905, however, French chemist Georges Urbain had proven that victorium was not a distinct element but rather an impurity of gadolinium.
