= Davyum =

Proposed chemical element

Davyum was the proposed name for a chemical element found by chemist Serge Kern in 1877. It was shown that the material was a mixture of iridium and rhodium. In 1950 it was proposed that the new metal might also have contained rhenium, which had not been discovered in Kern's time.

The proposed name paid homage to the acclaimed British chemist Sir Humphry Davy, who himself had discovered a multitude of elements, including sodium, potassium, calcium, and magnesium.
