= Carl Gustaf Mosander =

Swedish chemist

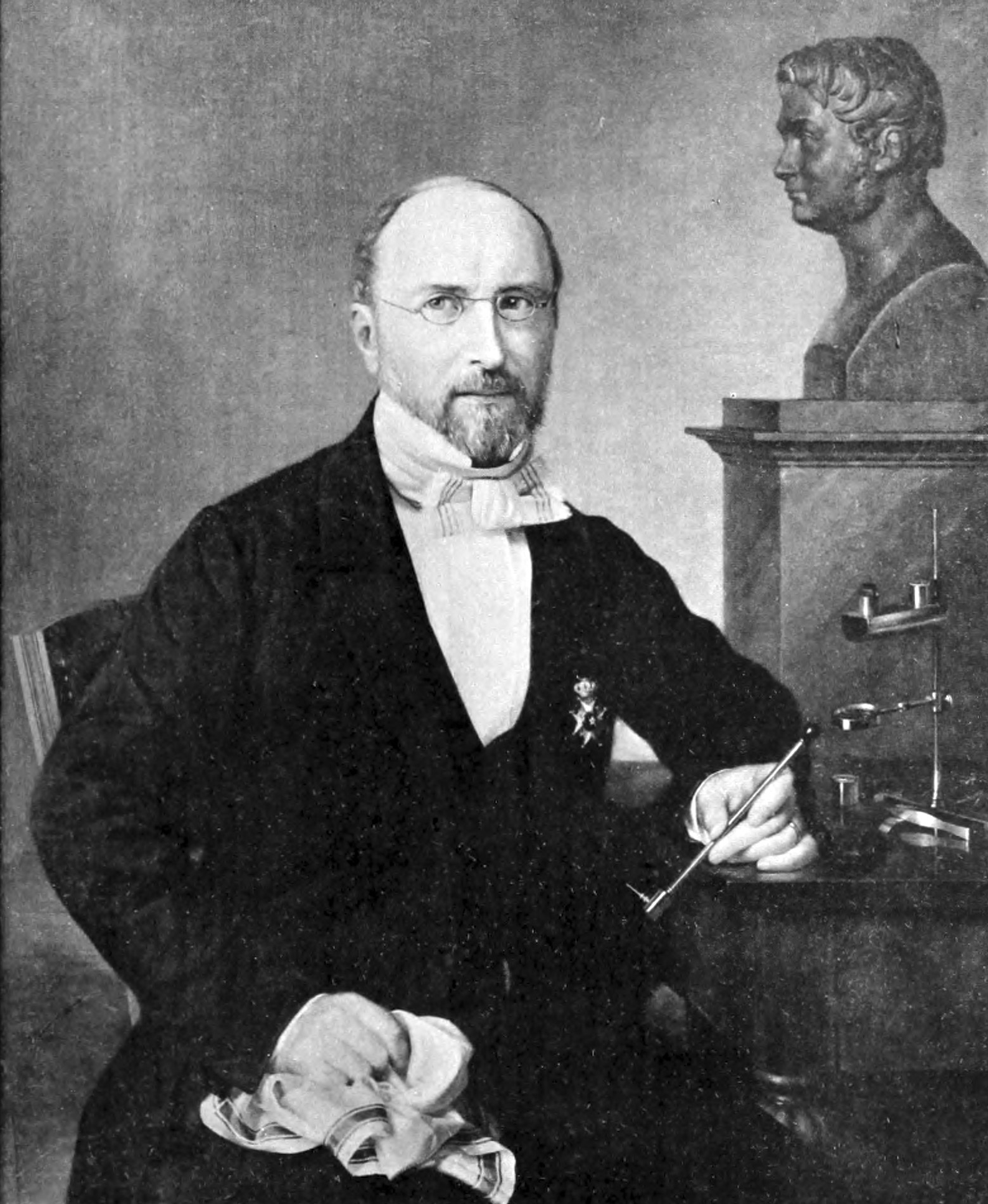
- Carl Gustaf Mosander
- Born: 10 September 1797; Kalmar
- Died: 15 October 1858 (aged 61); Lovö, Stockholm County
- Education: Karolinska Institute
- Known for: lanthanum erbium terbium
- Scientific career
- Fields: chemistry
- Workplaces: Karolinska Institute

Carl Gustaf Mosander (10 September 1797 – 15 October 1858) was a Swedish chemist. He discovered the rare earth elements lanthanum, erbium and terbium.

== Early life and education ==
Born in Kalmar, Mosander attended school there until he moved to Stockholm with his mother in 1809. In Stockholm, he became an apprentice at the Ugglan pharmacy. He took his pharmacy examination in 1817, but had an interest in medicine and joined the Karolinska Institute in 1820. He passed his medical examination in 1825. He worked in the laboratory of Jöns Jakob Berzelius and became a close friend of fellow student Friedrich Wöhler.

== Career ==
In 1832 Jöns Jakob Berzelius retired in favor of Mosander, his student, who succeeded him as professor of chemistry and pharmacy in the Karolinska Institute. From 1845 Mosander was also a professor at and inspector for the Pharmaceutical Institute. Mosander was an assistant curator of the mineralogical collections of the Swedish Museum of Natural History, founded by the Swedish Academy of Sciences in 1819. From 1825 he was the owner of a spa in Stockholm where people could go to drink the waters.

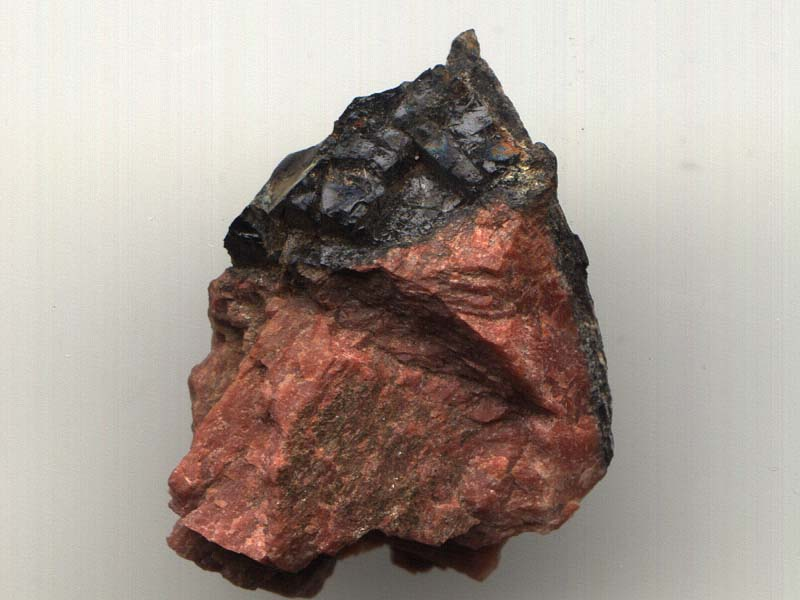
The mineral ytterbite (later named gadolinite). Lanthanum can be obtained from the black portion.

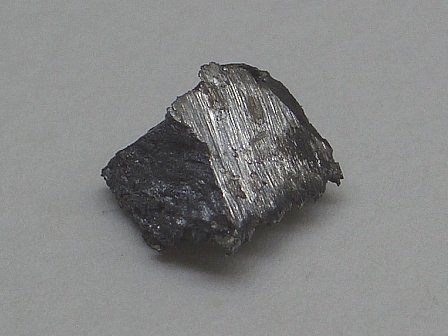
A sample of the element lanthanum.

Mosander discovered lanthanum in 1838. This came from the Cerite-(Ce) from Bastnaes, Sweden, which at the time was the only abundant source for "Cerium", which had been discovered therein by Berzelius and Hisinger, and independently by Klaproth, in 1803. At that time, one of the two known components of the mineral ytterbite (later named gadolinite) was a white oxide called ceria. Mosander partially decomposed ceria by heating it and treating the resulting salt with dilute nitric acid. He was hesitant to report his results, both for fear of embarrassing his mentor Berzelius, by showing that his discovery cerium was not an element; and because he was uncertain that he himself had reduced cerium to all of its components. Berzelius eventually suggested the name "lanthan", for "hidden" for this new discovery.

By 1840, Mosander had separated cerium oxide into yellow cerium oxide, white lanthanum oxide and a pinkish third component which he called "didymium" meaning "twin". Didymium was accepted as an element for many years, appearing in Dmitri Mendeleev's periodic system as number 95, with the symbol Di. In 1874, Per Teodor Cleve predicted that didymium contained at least two elements. In 1879, Lecoq de Boisbaudran isolated samarium, while in 1885 Carl Auer von Welsbach separated the two remaining elements through repeated fractional crystallizations. Welsbach named them praseodidymium (green didymium) and neodidymium (new didymium). They came to be known as praseodymium and neodymium.

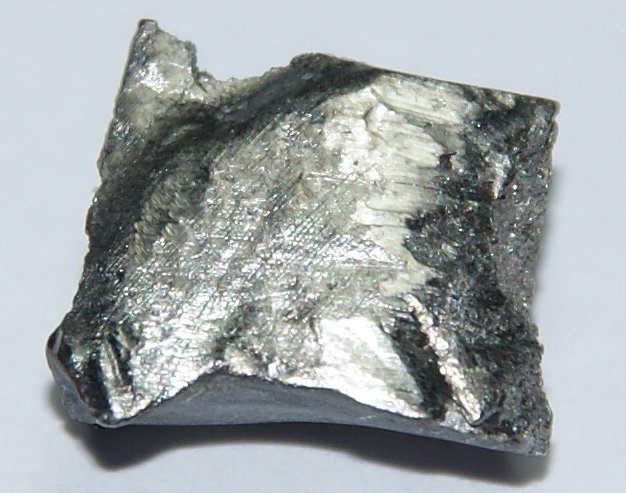
A sample of the element terbium.

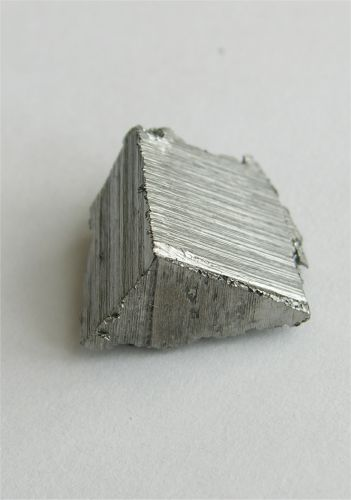
A sample of the element erbium.

In 1843 Mosander discovered terbium and erbium as components of yttria. However, this discovery was hotly contested. Spectroscopist Nils Johan Berlin denied that two elements existed, failing to confirm the existence of "erbia" and suggesting that its name be applied to "terbia". In 1864, Marc Delafontaine used optical spectroscopy to conclusively prove that yttrium, terbium and erbium were separate elements. Ironically, however, the confusion that had been introduced between the names continued. Mosander's proposed names were switched, giving the amethyst compound the name "erbium" oxide and the yellow substance the name "terbium" oxide, instead of the other way around as originally proposed.

Mosander was elected a member of the Royal Swedish Academy of Sciences in 1833.

== Personal life and final years ==
Mosander married Hulda Philippina Forsström on 20 December 1832. They had four children, two sets of twins.

Mosander suffered from cataracts in later life. He died in 1858, at his summer house on the island of Lovön, Stockholm County.
