= Charles Baskerville (chemist) =

American chemist (1870–1922)

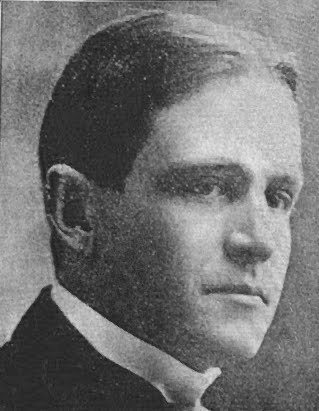
- Born: July 18, 1870; Deerbrook, Mississippi, U.S.
- Died: January 28, 1922 (aged 51)
- Education: University of North Carolina
- Known for: claimed discovery of carolinium and berzelium
- Scientific career
- Fields: chemistry
- Doctoral advisor: Francis Preston Venable
- Football career

North Carolina Tar Heels
- Position: Fullback

Personal information
- Listed height: 5 ft 9 in (1.75 m)
- Listed weight: 145 lb (66 kg)

Career information
- College: North Carolina (1892)

Awards and highlights
- Southern championship (1892)

Charles Baskerville (July 18, 1870 – January 28, 1922) was an American chemist. He announced the discovery of two new elements which claimed to have separated from thorium. Carolinium and berzelium later were identified to be identical with thorium.

== Life ==
Baskerville was born June 6, 1870, in Noxubee County, Mississippi. He studied chemistry at the University of Mississippi in 1886 and 1887 and graduated at from the University of Virginia. Later he studied at the Vanderbilt University, the University of Berlin and the University of North Carolina, where he received his B.S. degree in 1892 and Ph.D. in 1894. He became professor at the University of North Carolina and moved to the College of the City of New York in 1904, where he stayed until his death in 1922. He was survived by his wife, son and daughter. His son, Charles Baskerville, Jr., later became a successful artist.

Over his career, Baskerville published 190 papers, 8 books, and 16 patents. He was one of the most constant attendants on the meetings of the American Chemical Society, also a Fellow of the London Chemical Society, member of the Society of Chemical Industry, of the American Institute of Chemical Engineers, American Electrochemical Society, the Washington and New York Academies of Science, the Franklin Institute, and the American Association for the Advancement of Science.
