= Europium(II) sulfate =

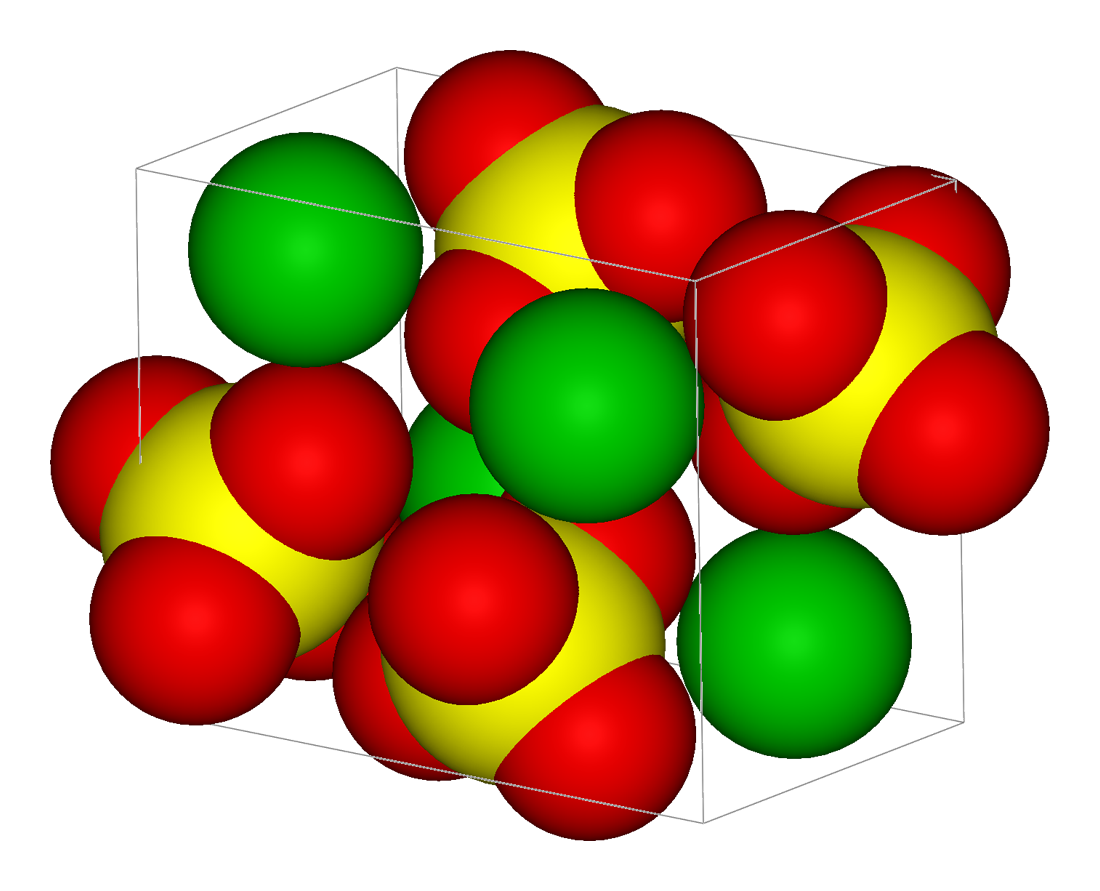

Identifiers
CAS Number	10031-54-6
3D model (JSmol)	Interactive image
ChemSpider	145296
ECHA InfoCard	100.030.071
EC Number	233-091-2
PubChem CID	165793
CompTox Dashboard (EPA)	DTXSID80884249
- InChI: InChI=1S/Eu.H2O4S/c;1-5(2,3)4/h;(H2,1,2,3,4)/q+2;/p-2 Key: ONQORTHCHCYWSQ-UHFFFAOYSA-L
- SMILES: [O-]S(=O)(=O)[O-].[Eu+2]

Properties
Chemical formula	EuO_{4}S
Molar mass	248.02 g·mol^{−1}
Appearance	white solid
Density	4.98 g/cm^{3} (β)
- Except where otherwise noted, data are given for materials in their standard state (at 25 °C [77 °F], 100 kPa). Infobox references

Europium(II) sulfate is the inorganic compound with the formula EuSO_{4}. Two polymorphs are known, α and the more stable β. Both are colorless. The β polymorph is isostructural with barium sulfate, hence it is insoluble in water.

== Preparation ==
The salt is generated by addition of soluble europium(II) salts to dilute sulfuric acid.

It can also be prepared by the reduction of europium(III) sulfate with hydrogen at 480-500 °C.
