= Carolinium =

Proposed chemical element

Carolinium and berzelium were the proposed names for new chemical elements that Charles Baskerville believed he had isolated from the already known element thorium.

== History ==
During his time at the University of North Carolina, Baskerville experimented with thorium and published his results in 1901. He reported having separated thorium into three fractions with slightly different chemical properties: the known thorium and two new elements, carolinium (symbol Cn) and berzelium (symbol Bz).

The names derived from two sources:

1. the first element was named for the State in which the university was located at which the experiments were done, North Carolina, and
2. the other element was named after Jöns Jakob Berzelius, a renowned Swedish chemist and discoverer of silicon, selenium, cerium and thorium.

As a response to the publication Bohuslav Brauner claimed that he already stated the fact that thorium should be a mixture of several elements.

In 1905, R. J. Meyer and A. Gumperz failed to replicate the results, and showed that thorium is only one element and not a mixture.

H. G. Wells's 1914 novel The World Set Free features an atomic bomb based on the similarly named "Carolinum". When detonated, the bomb continues to explode indefinitely.
