= Group 3 element =

Group of chemical elements

Group 3 in the periodic table
Hydrogen																															Helium
Lithium	Beryllium																									Boron	Carbon	Nitrogen	Oxygen	Fluorine	Neon
Sodium	Magnesium																									Aluminium	Silicon	Phosphorus	Sulfur	Chlorine	Argon
Potassium	Calcium															Scandium	Titanium	Vanadium	Chromium	Manganese	Iron	Cobalt	Nickel	Copper	Zinc	Gallium	Germanium	Arsenic	Selenium	Bromine	Krypton
Rubidium	Strontium															Yttrium	Zirconium	Niobium	Molybdenum	Technetium	Ruthenium	Rhodium	Palladium	Silver	Cadmium	Indium	Tin	Antimony	Tellurium	Iodine	Xenon
Caesium	Barium	Lanthanum	Cerium	Praseodymium	Neodymium	Promethium	Samarium	Europium	Gadolinium	Terbium	Dysprosium	Holmium	Erbium	Thulium	Ytterbium	Lutetium	Hafnium	Tantalum	Tungsten	Rhenium	Osmium	Iridium	Platinum	Gold	Mercury (element)	Thallium	Lead	Bismuth	Polonium	Astatine	Radon
Francium	Radium	Actinium	Thorium	Protactinium	Uranium	Neptunium	Plutonium	Americium	Curium	Berkelium	Californium	Einsteinium	Fermium	Mendelevium	Nobelium	Lawrencium	Rutherfordium	Dubnium	Seaborgium	Bohrium	Hassium	Meitnerium	Darmstadtium	Roentgenium	Copernicium	Nihonium	Flerovium	Moscovium	Livermorium	Tennessine	Oganesson
alkaline earth metals ← → group 4
IUPAC group number	3
Name by element	scandium group
CAS group number (US, pattern A-B-A)	IIIB
old IUPAC number (Europe, pattern A-B)	IIIA

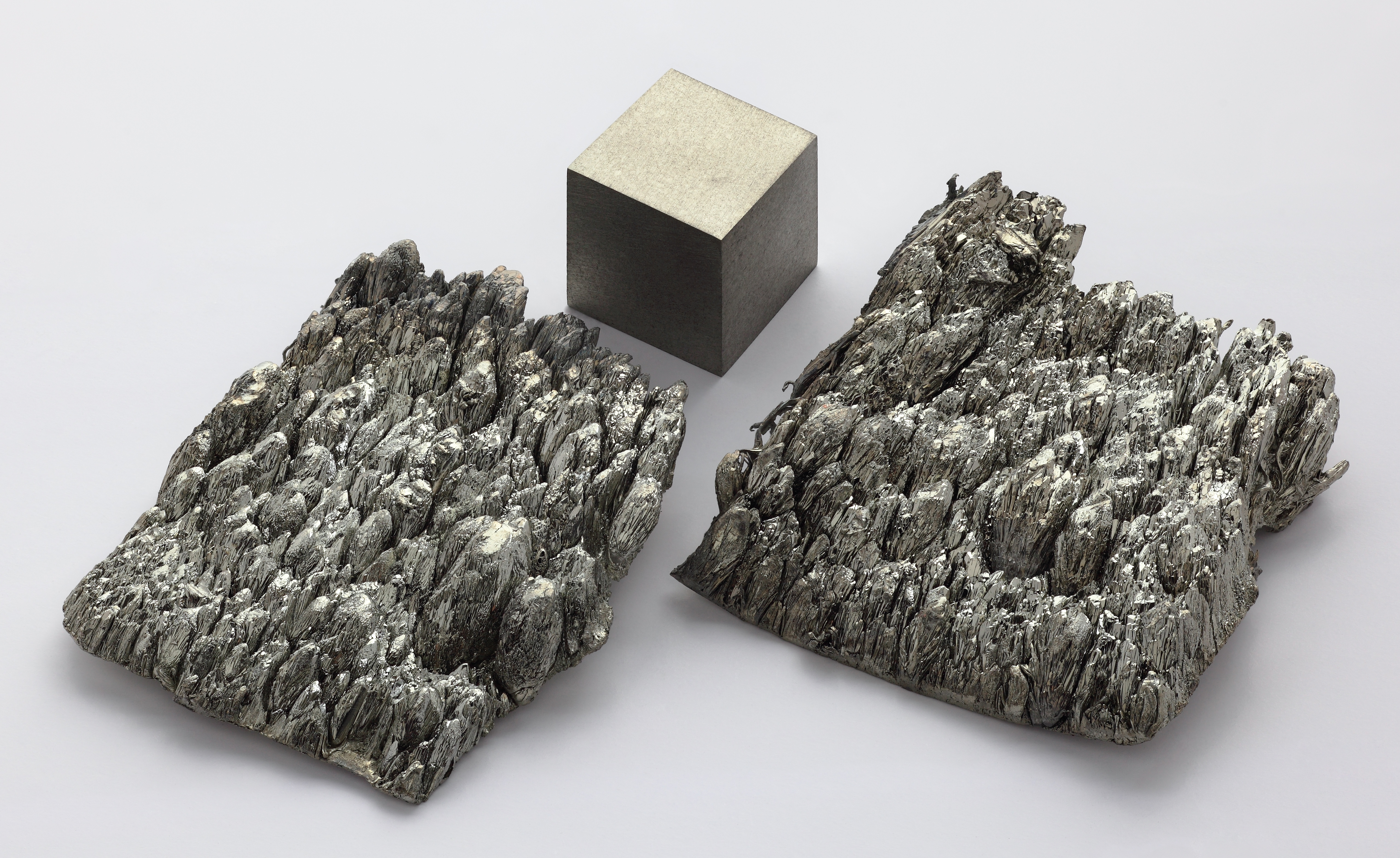
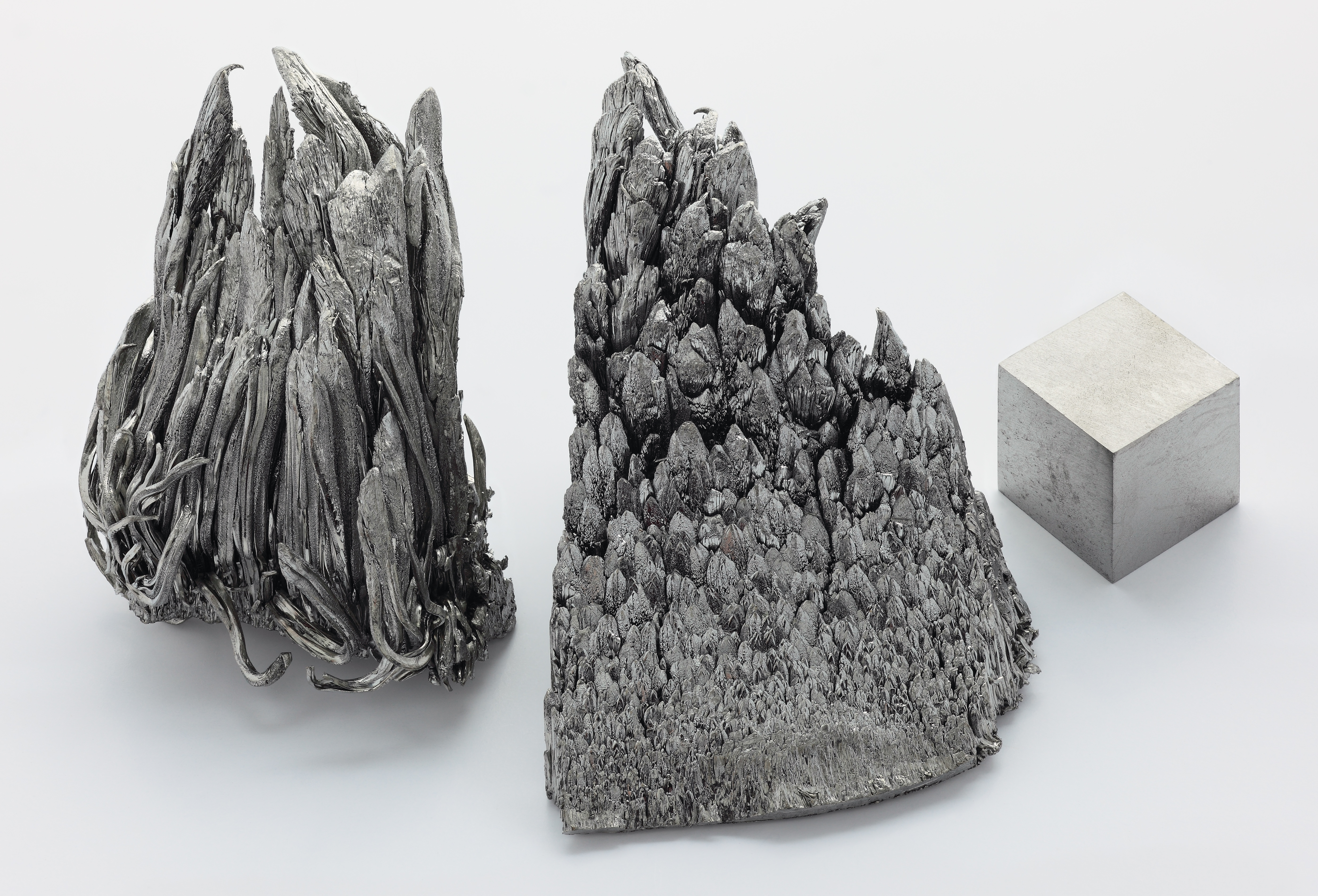
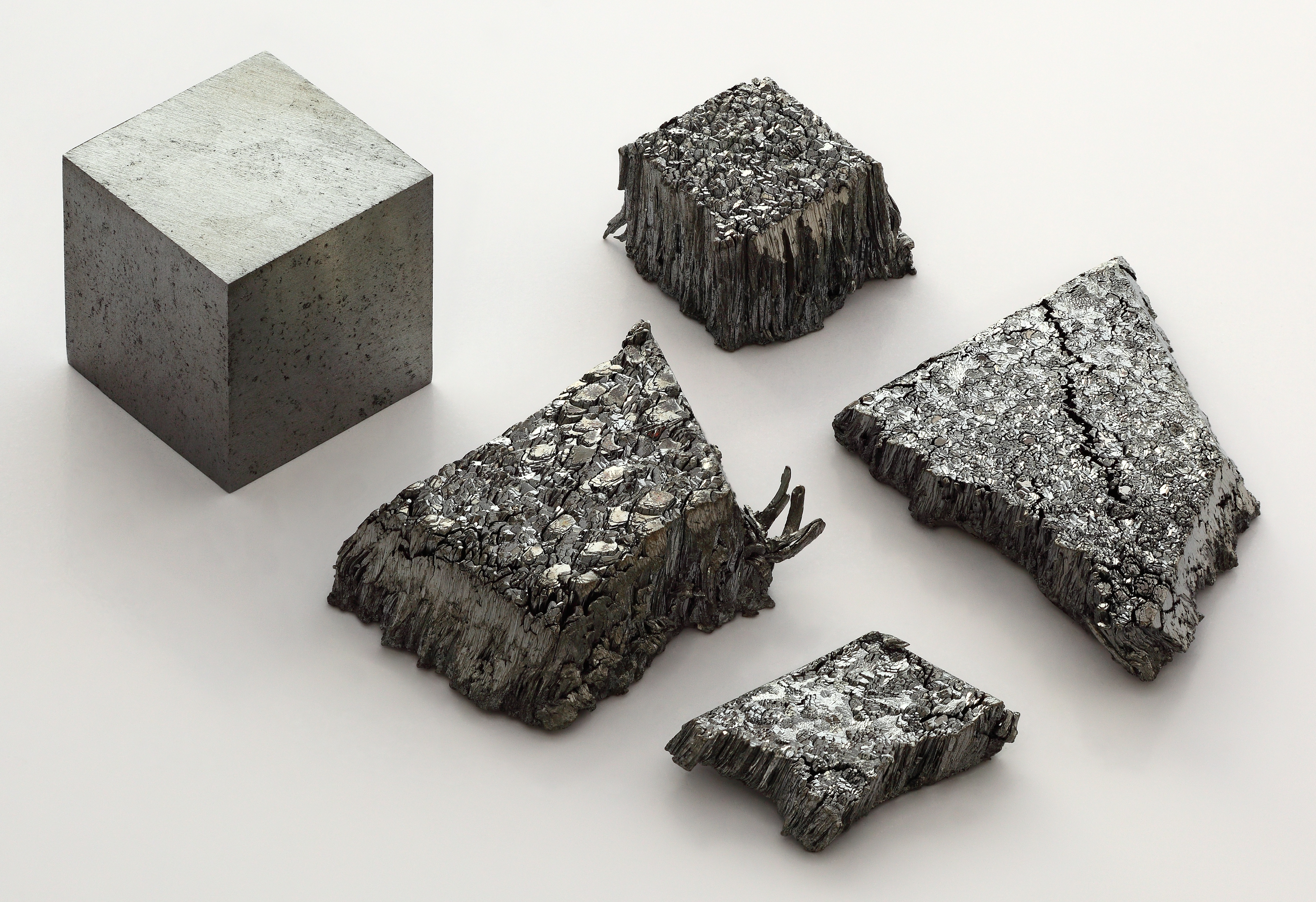
↓ Period
4	Scandium (Sc); 21 Transition metal
5	Yttrium (Y); 39 Transition metal
6	Lutetium (Lu); 71 Lanthanide
7	Lawrencium (Lr); 103 Actinide
Legend primordial element synthetic element Atomic number color:

Group 3 is the first group of transition metals in the periodic table. This group is closely related to the rare-earth elements. It contains the four elements scandium (Sc), yttrium (Y), lutetium (Lu), and lawrencium (Lr). The group is also called the scandium group or scandium family after its lightest member.

The chemistry of the group 3 elements is typical for early transition metals: they all essentially have only the group oxidation state of +3 as a major one, and like the preceding main-group metals are quite electropositive and have a less rich coordination chemistry. Due to the effects of the lanthanide contraction, yttrium and lutetium are very similar in properties. Yttrium and lutetium have essentially the chemistry of the heavy lanthanides, but scandium shows several differences due to its small size. This is a similar pattern to those of the early transition metal groups, where the lightest element is distinct from the very similar next two.

All the group 3 elements are rather soft, silvery-white metals, although their hardness increases with atomic number. They quickly tarnish in air and react with water, though their reactivity is masked by the formation of an oxide layer. The first three of them occur naturally, and especially yttrium and lutetium are almost invariably associated with the lanthanides due to their similar chemistry. Lawrencium is strongly radioactive: it does not occur naturally and must be produced by artificial synthesis, but its observed and theoretically predicted properties are consistent with it being a heavier homologue of lutetium. None of the group 3 elements have any biological role.Historically, sometimes lanthanum (La) and actinium (Ac) were included in the group instead of lutetium and lawrencium, because the electron configurations of many of the rare earths were initially measured wrongly. This version of group 3 is still commonly found in textbooks, but most authors focusing on the subject are against it. Many authors attempt to compromise between the two formats by leaving the spaces below yttrium blank, but this contradicts quantum mechanics as it results in an f-block that is 15 elements wide rather than 14 (the maximum occupancy of an f-subshell).

== Composition ==
Physical, chemical, and electronic evidence overwhelmingly shows that the correct elements in group 3 are scandium, yttrium, lutetium, and lawrencium: this is the classification adopted by most chemists and physicists who have considered the matter. This was noted at a presentation at the 33rd IUPAC General Assembly in 1985, supported by IUPAC in a 1988 report, and while in 2021 IUPAC instead considered it a matter of "convention" instead of science, it was still suggested that the form with lutetium in group 3 be used as a compromise. This classification dates back to Henry Bassett in 1892 and Alfred Werner in 1905 (though they left an empty space below yttrium as lutetium had not yet been discovered).

Many textbooks however show group 3 as containing scandium, yttrium, lanthanum, and actinium, a format based on historically wrongly measured electron configurations: Lev Landau and Evgeny Lifshitz already considered it to be "incorrect" in 1948, on the grounds that the 4f shell has already been completed by Lu and hence it must be a transition element. They did not yet take the step of removing lanthanum from the d-block as well, but Jun Kondō realized in 1963 that lanthanum's low-temperature superconductivity implied the activity of its 4f shell; and in 1965, David C. Hamilton linked this observation to its position in the periodic table, and argued that the f-block should be composed of the elements La–Yb and Ac–No. The issue was brought to a wide debate only in 1982 by William B. Jensen. In his 1982 article, Jensen quoted many cases where Sc, Y, and Lu behave the same way, but La behaves differently: the metallic crystal structure at room temperature; the structure of the oxides; the structure of the chlorides; a d-block-like structure for the conduction band; and the presence or absence of superconductivity. (It has nonetheless been argued that structures of Sc, Y, La, and Lu complexes depend on the sizes of the metal ions and are not an argument to choose between La or Lu in group 3.) This accords with the classic early 20th century separation of the rare earths by repeated precipitation or crystallization, in which the first separation achieved was into two groups: the cerium group and the yttrium group. The reason for this division arose from the difference in solubility of rare-earth double sulfates with sodium and potassium. The sodium double sulfates of the cerium group are poorly soluble, while those of the yttrium group are very soluble. Sc, Y, and Lu appear in the yttrium group, while La and Ac appear in the cerium group. This is also true for the occurrence of Sc, Y, Lu (yttrium group) and La (cerium group) in minerals. Jensen did not significantly consider Ac and Lr in his 1982 article, as little was known about Lr then; in 2015, he published an update to his article, noting that what had since come to light about Lr chemistry was entirely consistent with it being a d-block element. Meanwhile, Lu with its complete 4f shell and preferences for lower coordination numbers matches the succeeding 5d elements, and the trends going down Sc-Y-Lu better parallel trends elsewhere in the d-block (e.g. Ti-Zr-Hf, V-Nb-Ta) than the trends going down Sc-Y-La.

The spaces below yttrium are often left blank as a third option, but there is confusion in the literature on whether this format implies that group 3 contains only scandium and yttrium, or if it also contains all the lanthanides and actinides; either way, this format contradicts quantum physics by creating a 15-element-wide f-block when only 14 electrons can fit in an f-subshell. While the 2021 IUPAC report noted that 15-element-wide f-blocks are supported by some practitioners of a specialised branch of relativistic quantum mechanics focusing on the properties of superheavy elements, the project's opinion was that such interest-dependent concerns should not have any bearing on how the periodic table is presented to "the general chemical and scientific community". In fact, relativistic quantum-mechanical calculations of Lu and Lr compounds found no valence f-orbitals in either element. Other authors focusing on superheavy elements since clarified that the "15th entry of the f-block represents the first slot of the d-block which is left vacant to indicate the place of the f-block inserts", which would imply that this form still has Lu and Lr (the 15th entries in question) as d-block elements under Sc and Y. Indeed, when IUPAC publications expand the table to 32 columns, they make this clear and place Lu and Lr under Y.

As noted by the 2021 IUPAC report, Sc-Y-Lu-Lr is the only form that simultaneously allows for the preservation of the sequence of atomic number, avoids splitting the d-block into "two highly uneven portions", and gives the blocks the correct widths quantum mechanics demands (2, 6, 10, and 14). While arguments in favour of Sc-Y-La-Ac can still be found in the literature, many authors consider them to be logically inconsistent. For example, it has been argued that lanthanum and actinium cannot be f-block elements because their atoms have not begun to fill the f-subshells. But the same is true of thorium which is never disputed as an f-block element, proving that this criterion has nothing to do with block assignment as generally understood, and this argument overlooks the problem on the other end: that the f-shells complete filling at ytterbium and nobelium (matching the Sc-Y-Lu-Lr form), not at lutetium and lawrencium (as in Sc-Y-La-Ac). Lanthanum, actinium, and thorium are simply examples of exceptions to the Madelung rule; not only do those exceptions represent a minority of elements (only 20 out of 118), but they have also never been considered as relevant for positioning any other elements on the periodic table. In gaseous atoms, the d-shells complete their filling at copper (3d^{10}4s^{1}), palladium (4d^{10}5s^{0}), and gold (5d^{10}6s^{1}), but it is universally accepted by chemists that these configurations are exceptional and that the d-block really ends in accordance with the Madelung rule at zinc (3d^{10}4s^{2}), cadmium (4d^{10}5s^{2}), and mercury (5d^{10}6s^{2}). The relevant fact for placement is that lanthanum and actinium (like thorium) have valence f-orbitals that can become occupied in chemical environments, whereas lutetium and lawrencium do not: their f-shells are in the core, and cannot be used for chemical reactions. Thus the relationship between yttrium and lanthanum is only a secondary relationship between elements with the same number of valence electrons but different kinds of valence orbitals, such as that between chromium and uranium; whereas the relationship between yttrium and lutetium is primary, sharing both valence electron count and valence orbital type. Likewise it is also problematic to argue that the f-block should follow the number of electrons in trivalent lanthanide cations, from Ce^{3+} [Xe]4f^{1} to Lu^{3+} [Xe]4f^{14}, as this would imply that La^{3+} [Xe] with its noble gas configuration could not be assigned to either the f-block or the d-block.

== History ==
The discovery of the group 3 elements is inextricably tied to that of the rare earths, with which they are universally associated in nature. In 1787, Swedish part-time chemist Carl Axel Arrhenius found a heavy black rock near the Swedish village of Ytterby, Sweden (part of the Stockholm Archipelago). Thinking that it was an unknown mineral containing the newly discovered element tungsten, he named it ytterbite. (Note: Ytterbite was named after the village it was discovered near, plus the -ite ending to indicate it was a mineral.) Finnish scientist Johan Gadolin identified a new oxide or "earth" in Arrhenius' sample in 1789, and published his completed analysis in 1794; in 1797, the new oxide was named yttria. In the decades after French scientist Antoine Lavoisier developed the first modern definition of chemical elements, it was believed that earths could be reduced to their elements, meaning that the discovery of a new earth was equivalent to the discovery of the element within, which in this case would have been yttrium. (Note: Earths were given an -a ending and new elements are normally given an -ium ending.) Until the early 1920s, the chemical symbol "Yt" was used for the element, after which "Y" came into common use. Yttrium metal, albeit impure, was first prepared in 1828 when Friedrich Wöhler heated anhydrous yttrium(III) chloride with potassium to form metallic yttrium and potassium chloride. In fact, Gadolin's yttria proved to be a mixture of many metal oxides, that started the history of the discovery of the rare earths.

In 1869, Russian chemist Dmitri Mendeleev published his periodic table, which had an empty space for an element above yttrium. Mendeleev made several predictions on this hypothetical element, which he called eka-boron. By then, Gadolin's yttria had already been split several times; first by Swedish chemist Carl Gustaf Mosander, who in 1843 had split out two more earths which he called terbia and erbia (splitting the name of Ytterby just as yttria had been split); and then in 1878 when Swiss chemist Jean Charles Galissard de Marignac split terbia and erbia themselves into more earths. Among these was ytterbia (a component of the old erbia), which Swedish chemist Lars Fredrik Nilson successfully split in 1879 to reveal yet another new element. He named it scandium, from the Latin Scandia meaning "Scandinavia". Nilson was apparently unaware of Mendeleev's prediction, but Per Teodor Cleve recognized the correspondence and notified Mendeleev. Chemical experiments on scandium proved that Mendeleev's suggestions were correct; along with discovery and characterization of gallium and germanium this proved the correctness of the whole periodic table and periodic law. Metallic scandium was produced for the first time in 1937 by electrolysis of a eutectic mixture, at 700–800 °C, of potassium, lithium, and scandium chlorides. Scandium exists in the same ores from which yttrium had been discovered, but is much rarer and probably for that reason had eluded discovery.

The remaining component of Marignac's ytterbia also proved to be a composite. In 1907, French scientist Georges Urbain, Austrian mineralogist Baron Carl Auer von Welsbach, and American chemist Charles James all independently discovered a new element within ytterbia. Welsbach proposed the name cassiopeium for his new element (after Cassiopeia), whereas Urbain chose the name lutecium (from Latin Lutetia, for Paris). The dispute on the priority of the discovery is documented in two articles in which Urbain and von Welsbach accuse each other of publishing results influenced by the published research of the other. In 1909, the Commission on Atomic Mass, which was responsible for the attribution of the names for the new elements, granted priority to Urbain and adopting his names as official ones. An obvious problem with this decision was that Urbain was one of the four members of the commission. In 1949, the spelling of element 71 was changed to lutetium. Later work connected with Urbain's attempts to further split his lutecium however revealed that it had only contained traces of the new element 71, and that it was only von Welsbach's cassiopeium that was pure element 71. For this reason many German scientists continued to use the name cassiopeium for the element until the 1950s. Ironically, Charles James, who had modestly stayed out of the argument as to priority, worked on a much larger scale than the others, and undoubtedly possessed the largest supply of lutetium at the time. Lutetium was the last of the stable rare earths to be discovered. Over a century of research had split the original yttrium of Gadolin into yttrium, scandium, lutetium, and seven other new elements.

Lawrencium is the only element of the group that does not occur naturally. It was probably first synthesized by Albert Ghiorso and his team on February 14, 1961, at the Lawrence Radiation Laboratory (now called the Lawrence Berkeley National Laboratory) at the University of California, Berkeley. The first atoms of lawrencium were produced by bombarding a three-milligram target consisting of three isotopes of the element californium with boron-10 and boron-11 nuclei from the Heavy Ion Linear Accelerator (HILAC). The nuclide ^{257}_{103}Lr was originally reported. The team at the University of California suggested the name lawrencium (after Ernest O. Lawrence, the inventor of cyclotron particle accelerator) and the symbol "Lw", for the new element; IUPAC accepted their discovery, but changed the symbol to "Lr". In 1965, nuclear-physics researchers in Dubna, Soviet Union (now Russia) reported ^{256}_{103}Lr, in 1967, they reported that they were not able to confirm American scientists' data on ^{257}_{103}Lr, and proposed the name "rutherfordium" for the new element. The Dubna group criticised the IUPAC approval of the Berkeley group's discovery as having been hasty. In 1971, the Berkeley group did a whole series of experiments aimed at measuring the nuclear decay properties of lawrencium isotopes, in which all previous results from Berkeley and Dubna were confirmed, except that the initial ^{257}_{103}Lr isotope reported at Berkeley in 1961 turned out to have been ^{258}_{103}Lr. In 1992, the IUPAC Trans-fermium Working Group named the nuclear physics teams at Dubna and Berkeley as the co-discoverers of element 103. When IUPAC made the final decision of the naming of the elements beyond 100 in 1997, it decided to keep the name "lawrencium" and symbol "Lr" for element 103 as it had been in use for a long time by that point. The name "rutherfordium" was assigned to the following element 104, which the Berkeley team had proposed it for.

== Characteristics ==
=== Chemical ===
Electron configurations of the group 3 elements
Z	Element	Electrons per shell	Electron configuration
21	Sc, scandium	2, 8, 9, 2	[Ar] 3d^{1} 4s^{2}
39	Y, yttrium	2, 8, 18, 9, 2	[Kr] 4d^{1} 5s^{2}
71	Lu, lutetium	2, 8, 18, 32, 9, 2	[Xe] 4f^{14} 5d^{1} 6s^{2}
103	Lr, lawrencium	2, 8, 18, 32, 32, 8, 3	[Rn] 5f^{14} 6d^{0} 7s^{2} 7p^{1}

Like other groups, the members of this family show patterns in their electron configurations, especially the outermost shells, resulting in trends in chemical behavior. Due to relativistic effects that become important for high atomic numbers, lawrencium's configuration has an irregular 7p occupancy instead of the expected 6d, but the regular [Rn]5f^{14}6d^{1}7s^{2} configuration is low enough in energy that no significant difference from the rest of the group is observed or expected.

Most of the chemistry has been observed only for the first three members of the group; chemical properties of lawrencium are not well-characterized, but what is known and predicted matches its position as a heavier homolog of lutetium. The remaining elements of the group (scandium, yttrium, lutetium) are quite electropositive. They are reactive metals, although this is not obvious due to the formation of a stable oxide layer which prevents further reactions. The metals burn easily to give the oxides, which are white high-melting solids. They are usually oxidized to the +3 oxidation state, in which they form mostly ionic compounds and have a mostly cationic aqueous chemistry. In this way they are similar to the lanthanides, although they lack the involvement of f orbitals that characterises the chemistry of the 4f elements lanthanum through ytterbium. The stable group 3 elements are thus often grouped with the 4f elements as the so-called rare earths.

Typical transition-metal properties are mostly absent from this group, as they are for the heavier elements of groups 4 and 5: there is only one typical oxidation state and the coordination chemistry is not very rich (though high coordination numbers are common due to the large size of the M^{3+} ions). This said, low-oxidation state compounds may be prepared and some cyclopentadienyl chemistry is known. The chemistries of group 3 elements are thus mostly distinguished by their atomic radii: yttrium and lutetium are very similar, but scandium stands out as the least basic and the best complexing agent, approaching aluminium in some properties. They naturally take their places together with the rare earths in a series of trivalent elements: yttrium acts as a rare earth intermediate between dysprosium and holmium in basicity; lutetium as less basic than the 4f elements and the least basic of the lanthanides; and scandium as a rare earth less basic than even lutetium. Scandium oxide is amphoteric; lutetium oxide is more basic (although it can with difficulty be made to display some acidic properties), and yttrium oxide is more basic still. Salts with strong acids of these metals are soluble, whereas those with weak acids (e.g. fluorides, phosphates, oxalates) are sparingly soluble or insoluble.

=== Physical ===
The trends in group 3 follow those of the other early d-block groups and reflect the addition of a filled f-shell into the core in passing from the fifth to the sixth period. For example, scandium and yttrium are both soft metals. But because of the lanthanide contraction, the expected increase in atomic radius from yttrium to lutetium is reversed; lutetium atoms are slightly smaller than yttrium atoms, but are heavier and have a higher nuclear charge. This makes the metal more dense, and also harder because the extraction of the electrons from the atom to form metallic bonding becomes more difficult. All three metals have similar melting and boiling points. Very little is known about lawrencium, but calculations suggest it continues the trend of its lighter congeners toward increasing density.

Scandium, yttrium, and lutetium all crystallize in the hexagonal close-packed structure at room temperature, and lawrencium is expected to do the same. The stable members of the group are known to change structure at high temperature. In comparison with most metals, they are not very good conductors of heat and electricity because of the low number of electrons available for metallic bonding.

Properties of the group 3 elements
Name	Sc, scandium	Y, yttrium	Lu, lutetium	Lr, lawrencium
Melting point	1814 K, 1541 °C	1799 K, 1526 °C	1925 K, 1652 °C	1900 K, 1627 °C
Boiling point	3109 K, 2836 °C	3609 K, 3336 °C	3675 K, 3402 °C	?
Density	2.99 g cm^{−3}	4.47 g cm^{−3}	9.84 g cm^{−3}	? 14.4 g cm^{−3}
Appearance	silver metallic	silver white	silver gray	?
Atomic radius	162 pm	180 pm	174 pm	?

== Occurrence ==
Scandium, yttrium, and lutetium tend to occur together with the other lanthanides (except short-lived promethium) in the Earth's crust, and are often harder to extract from their ores. The abundance of elements in Earth's crust for group 3 is quite low—all the elements in the group are uncommon, the most abundant being yttrium with abundance of approximately 30 parts per million (ppm); the abundance of scandium is 16 ppm, while that of lutetium is about 0.5 ppm. For comparison, the abundance of copper is 50 ppm, that of chromium is 160 ppm, and that of molybdenum is 1.5 ppm.

Scandium is distributed sparsely and occurs in trace amounts in many minerals. Rare minerals from Scandinavia and Madagascar such as gadolinite, euxenite, and thortveitite are the only known concentrated sources of this element, the latter containing up to 45% of scandium in the form of scandium(III) oxide. Yttrium has the same trend in occurrence places; it is found in lunar rock samples collected during the American Apollo Project in a relatively high content as well.

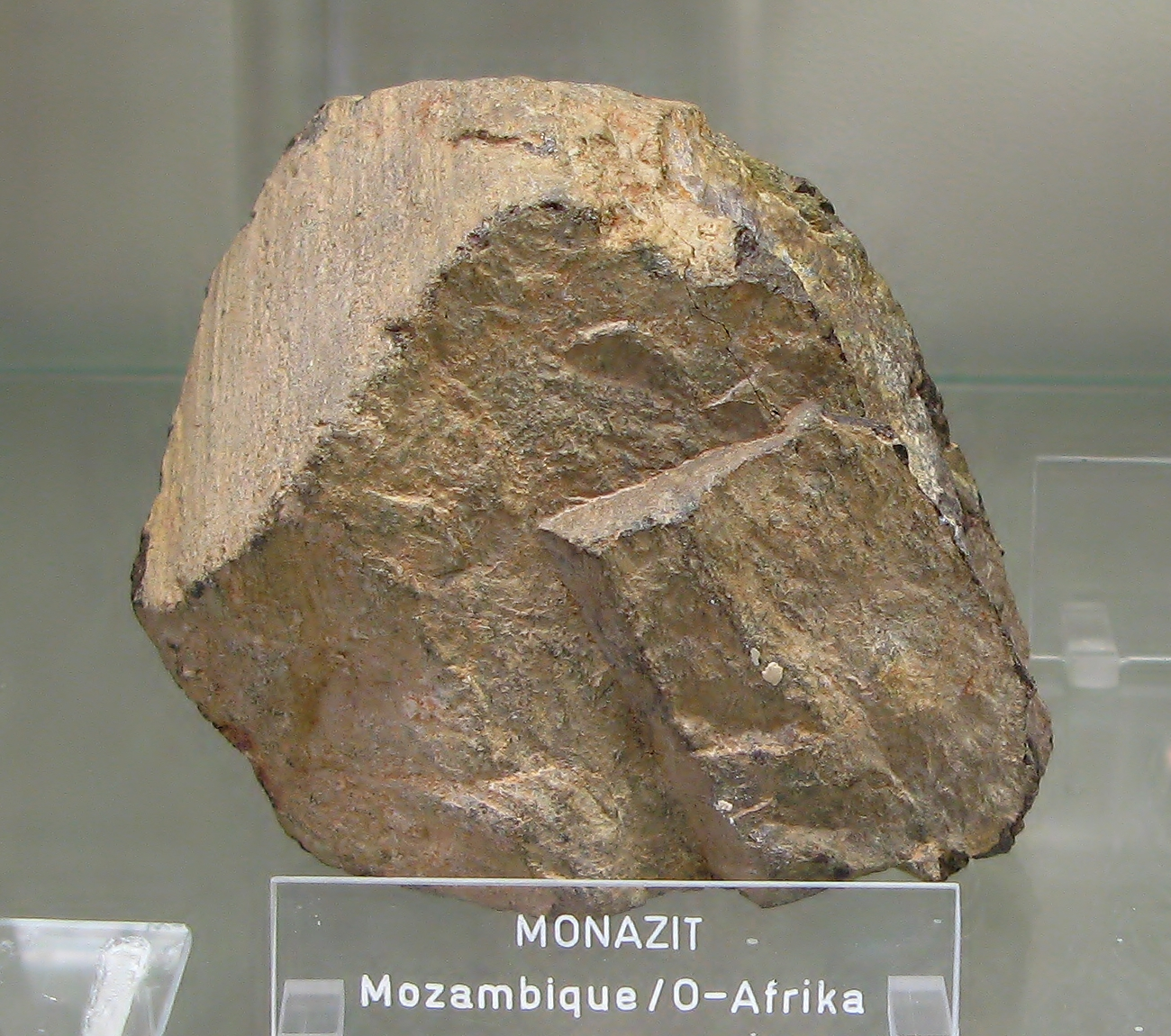
Monazite, the most important lutetium ore

The principal commercially viable ore of lutetium is the rare-earth phosphate mineral monazite, (Ce,La,etc_{.})PO_{4}, which contains 0.003% of the element. The main mining areas are China, United States, Brazil, India, Sri Lanka and Australia. Pure lutetium metal is one of the rarest and most expensive of the rare-earth metals with the price about US$10,000/kg, or about one-fourth that of gold.

== Production ==
The most available element in group 3 is yttrium, with annual production of 8,900 tonnes in 2010. Yttrium is mostly produced as oxide, by a single country, China (99%). Lutetium and scandium are also mostly obtained as oxides, and their annual production by 2001 was about 10 and 2 tonnes, respectively.

Group 3 elements are mined only as a byproduct from the extraction of other elements. They are not often produced as the pure metals; the production of metallic yttrium is about a few tonnes, and that of scandium is in the order of 10 kg per year; production of lutetium is not calculated, but it is certainly small. The elements, after purification from other rare-earth metals, are isolated as oxides; the oxides are converted to fluorides during reactions with hydrofluoric acid. The resulting fluorides are reduced with alkaline earth metals or alloys of the metals; metallic calcium is used most frequently. For example:

Sc_{2}O_{3} + 3 HF → 2 ScF_{3} + 3 H_{2}O
2 ScF_{3} + 3 Ca → 3 CaF_{2} + 2 Sc

== Biological chemistry ==
Group 3 metals have low availability to the biosphere. Scandium, yttrium, and lutetium have no documented biological role in living organisms. The high radioactivity of lawrencium would make it highly toxic to living cells, causing radiation poisoning.

Scandium concentrates in the liver and is a threat to it; some of its compounds are possibly carcinogenic, even though in general scandium is not toxic. Scandium is known to have reached the food chain, but in trace amounts only; a typical human takes in less than 0.1 micrograms per day. Once released into the environment, scandium gradually accumulates in soils, which leads to increased concentrations in soil particles, animals and humans. Scandium is mostly dangerous in the working environment, due to the fact that damps and gases can be inhaled with air. This can cause lung embolisms, especially during long-term exposure. The element is known to damage cell membranes of water animals, causing several negative influences on reproduction and on the functions of the nervous system.

Yttrium tends to concentrate in the liver, kidney, spleen, lungs, and bones of humans. There is normally as little as 0.5 milligrams found within the entire human body; human breast milk contains 4 ppm. Yttrium can be found in edible plants in concentrations between 20 ppm and 100 ppm (fresh weight), with cabbage having the largest amount. With up to 700 ppm, the seeds of woody plants have the highest known concentrations.

Lutetium concentrates in bones, and to a lesser extent in the liver and kidneys. Lutetium salts are known to cause metabolism and they occur together with other lanthanide salts in nature; the element is the least abundant in the human body of all lanthanides. Human diets have not been monitored for lutetium content, so it is not known how much the average human takes in, but estimations show the amount is only about several micrograms per year, all coming from tiny amounts taken by plants. Soluble lutetium salts are mildly toxic, but insoluble ones are not.

== Bibliography ==
- Emsley, John (2001). Nature's building blocks: an A-Z guide to the elements. US: Oxford University Press. ISBN 0-19-850341-5.
- Greenwood, Norman N.; Earnshaw, Alan (1997). Chemistry of the Elements (2nd ed.). Butterworth-Heinemann. doi:10.1016/C2009-0-30414-6. ISBN 978-0-08-037941-8.
