= Arrhenius =

Arrhenius may refer to:

- Birgit Arrhenius (born 1932), Swedish archaeologist
- Carl Axel Arrhenius (1757–1824), Swedish army lieutenant and amateur mineralogist who discovered ytterbite, a mineral that led to the discovery of yttrium by Johan Gadolin
- Karin Arrhenius (born 1972), Swedish screenwriter
- Leif Arrhenius (born 1986), American-Swedish athlete
- Niklas Arrhenius (born 1982), Swedish discus thrower
- Olof Arrhenius (1895–1977), Swedish plant physiologist
- Svante Arrhenius (1859–1927), Swedish physical chemist and 1903 Nobel laureate

- Arrhenius definition, Svante Arrhenius definition of acids and bases
- Arrhenius equation, Svante Arrhenius formula for modeling the temperature dependence of reaction rate constants
- Arrhenius plot
- Arrhenius (lunar crater), named for Svante Arrhenius
- 5697 Arrhenius, main-belt asteroid, named for Svante Arrhenius
- Arrhenius (Martian crater), named for Svante Arrhenius
