= Allanite =

Rare-earth enriched sorosilicate mineral

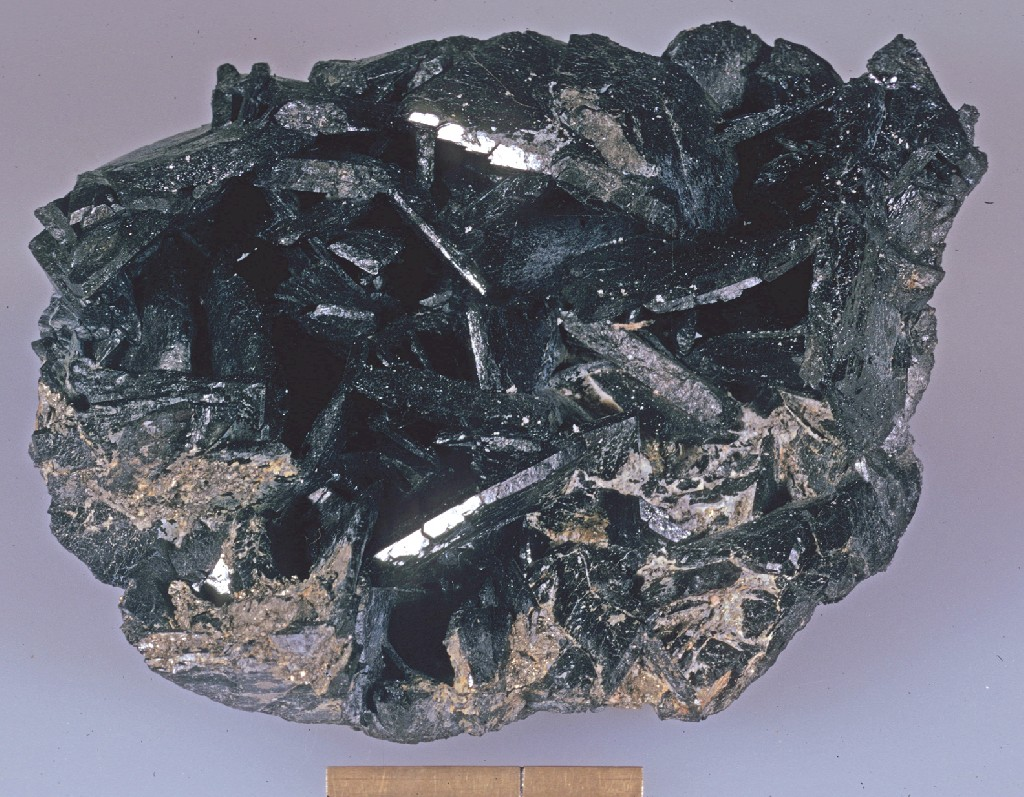
- Allanite from the Mt. Isa – Cloncurry area, Queensland, Australia (scale bar 1 inch)

General
- Category: Sorosilicates
- Formula: (Ce,Ca,Y,La)_{2}(Al,Fe^{+3})_{3}(SiO_{4})_{3}(OH)
- IMA symbol: Aln
- Strunz classification: 9.BG.05b
- Crystal system: Monoclinic
- Crystal class: Prismatic (2/m) (same H-M symbol)
- Space group: P2_{1}/m
- Unit cell: a = 8.927, b = 5.761 c = 10.15 [Å]; β = 114.77°; Z = 2

Identification
- Color: Brown to black
- Crystal habit: Crystals tabular, prismatic to acicular; granular, massive; commonly metamict
- Twinning: Polysynthetic, common on {100}
- Cleavage: Imperfect to poor
- Fracture: Conchoidal to uneven
- Tenacity: Brittle
- Mohs scale hardness: 5.5–6
- Luster: Vitreous, resinous to submetallic
- Streak: Grey
- Diaphaneity: Translucent to opaque
- Specific gravity: 3.5–4.2
- Optical properties: Biaxial (−)
- Refractive index: n_{α} = 1.715–1.791, n_{β} = 1.718–1.815, n_{γ} = 1.733–1.822
- Birefringence: δ = 0.018–0.031
- Pleochroism: X = pale olive-green, reddish brown; Y = dark brown, brownish yellow; Z = dark reddish brown, greenish brown
- 2V angle: Measured: 40° to 80°
- Dispersion: r > v; strong
- Other characteristics: Radioactive if uranium and/or thorium-rich

Allanite (also called orthite) is a sorosilicate group of minerals within the broader epidote group that contain a significant amount of rare-earth elements. The mineral occurs mainly in metamorphosed clay-rich sediments and felsic igneous rocks. It has the general formula A_{2}M_{3}Si_{3}O_{12}[OH], where the A sites can contain large cations such as Ca^{2+}, Sr^{2+}, and rare-earth elements, and the M sites admit Al^{3+}, Fe^{3+}, Mn^{3+}, Fe^{2+}, or Mg^{2+} among others. However, a large amount of additional elements, including Th, U, Be, Zr, P, Ba, Cr and others may be present in the mineral. The International Mineralogical Association lists four minerals in the allanite group, each recognized as a unique mineral: allanite-(Ce), allanite-(La), allanite-(Nd), and allanite-(Y), depending on the dominant rare earth present: cerium, lanthanum, neodymium or yttrium.

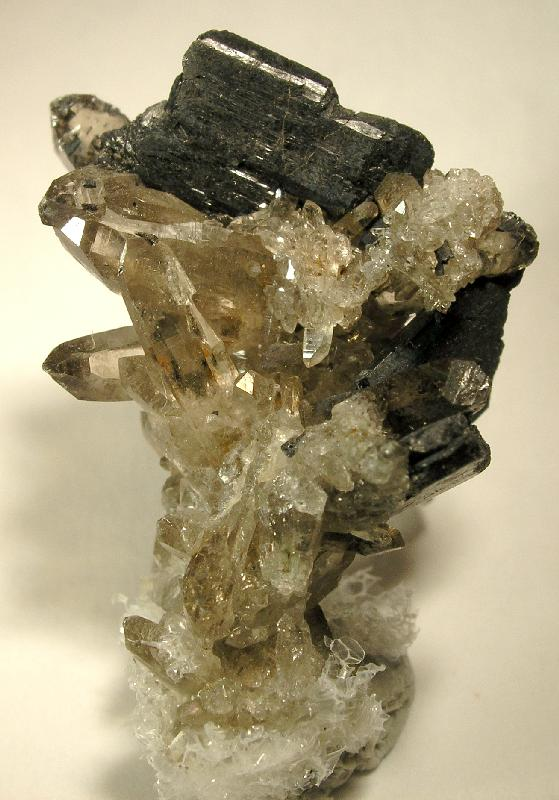
Allanite crystals on smoky quartz from the White Mountain Wilderness, Lincoln County, New Mexico, USA (size: 2.7 × 1.8 × 1.7 cm)

Allanite contains up to 20% rare-earth elements and is a valuable source of them. The inclusion of thorium and other radioactive elements in allanite results in some interesting phenomena. Allanite often has a pleochroic halo of radiation damage in the minerals immediately adjacent. Also highly radioactive grains of allanite often have their structure disrupted or are metamict. The age of allanite grains that have not been destroyed by radiation can be determined using different techniques.

Allanite is usually black in color, but can be brown or brown-violet. It is often coated with a yellow-brown alteration product, likely limonite. It crystallizes in the monoclinic system and forms prismatic crystals. It has a Mohs hardness of 5.5–6 and a specific gravity of 3.5–4.2. It is also pyrognomic, meaning that it becomes incandescent at a relatively low temperature of about 95 °C.

It was discovered in 1810 and named for the Scottish mineralogist Thomas Allan (1777–1833). The type locality is Aluk Island, Greenland, where it was first discovered by Karl Ludwig Giesecke.

== See also ==
- List of minerals
- List of minerals named after people
- Austrium
- Dollaseite-(Ce)
