= Aluk Island =

Island in Kujalleq, Greenland

Aluk Avalleq
- Interactive map of Aluk Avalleq

Geography
- Location: North Atlantic Ocean, Greenland
- Coordinates: 60°09′26″N 43°04′48″W

Administration
- Greenland
- Municipality: Kujalleq

Aluk Island or Aluk Avalleq is an island off Prins Christian Sound, in Kujalleq municipality in southern Greenland. It is located to the east of Aluk Tunorleq island.

This island is the type locality for allanite a member of the epidote mineral group.

== See also ==
- List of islands of Greenland
