= Pehr Adrian Gadd =

Pehr Adrian Gadd (12 April 1727 – 11 August 1797) was a Finnish economist, chemist, and naturalist. As a professor at the Åbo Academy in Turku he oversaw nearly 103 theses by students.

Gadd was born in Pirkkala, Travestehus, where his father Jakob worked in the crown office in Upper Satakunda,. His mother Sara Gottleben came from Pori. He was educated in the Åbo Academy in Turku and graduated in 1748 with a degree in philosophy. He was a student of Pehr Kalm. In 1751, his master's thesis was an economic description of the Satakunda districts. He travelled from 1753 to 1755 to study plants around Finland. He studied native use of plants and was interested in plants of economic value such as those used in dyeing and experimented with the cultivation of tobacco. He served as an inspector of salt-petre from 1755 to 1761. He conducted experiments on silk cultivation, growing mulberry for silkworms. In 1758, he joined the Turku Academy as an honorary professor and became a regular professor of chemistry in 1762, establishing a laboratory in 1764. He also took an interest in agriculture and examined potash production and dealing with fire. He also developed a collection of minerals and rocks at the academy. One of his students was Johan Gadolin who became a professor of chemistry in 1789. Gadolin made the laboratory a part of student instruction.

Gadd married writer Brita Sidonia, daughter of Bishop Jonas Fahlenius in 1759. In 1761 he was made a member of the Royal Swedish Academy of Sciences.
