= ABEA =

Greek food company

- Ανώνυμος Βιομηχανική Εταιρία Ανατολή
- Abbreviation: ΑΒΕΑ
- Formation: 1889; 137 years ago
- Founder: Jules Dey
- Founded at: Nea Chora, Chania
- Headquarters: Agrokipio, Municipality of Eleftherios Venizelos, Chania, Crete, Greece
- Region served: Crete
- Services: Olive oil, pomace and soap production
- Official language: English, Greek
- Website: www.abea.gr

ABEA (Greek: Ανώνυμος Βιομηχανική Εταιρία Ανατολή -ΑΒΕΑ, Anatoli Industries S.A. -AVEA) is a company that produces olive oil in their factories in Crete, Greece. It was founded in 1889 and today is the oldest olive oil processing plant in Greece. Their headquarters are based in the city of Chania. In the 2017 Cretan Olive Oil Competition, ABEA finished 5th in the "Honorable Mentions" list for the "Organic Olive Oil" award. Their shop, headquarters, and factories are all based within the Chania regional unit.

== History ==
In 1889 Jules Dey (Greek: Ιούλιος Δέης), a French chemist, founded the company in the Nea Chora district of the city of Chania, and started producing olive pomace oil. The company's plant in Chania was situated next to the Jewish cemetery. Dey, was already active in Tunisia, where he had built a similar factory, processing and exporting to France material for making Marseille soap. In 1894, the company was acquired by the Sahel Tunisien company. The building permit for the first factory was issued in 1899 by the Executive Council of the autonomous Cretan State.

In 1916 a group of local businessmen repurchased the company; these were Petros Markantonakis, Georgios Kassimatis, Constantinos Manoussakis, Ioannis Naxakis, and Kyriakos Naxakis. The company was renamed to its present name, and the new entity was officially incorporated on January 16, 1917, by the revolutionary Provisional Government of Eleftherios Venizelos in Thessaloniki. Since then, the company operated successfully until the breakout of World War II. Venizelos had close personal ties with the owners of the company, and at least one time, in the early 1930s, he visited the factory, possibly when its reconstruction procedure (completed in 1935) was in progress. During the Battle of Crete, multiple air bombings by the Nazis destroyed much of the factory and infrastructure. It was rebuilt in the years after the war and operations resumed. In 1951 the company changed its status following from then on a cooperative model of enterprise by local producers, focusing in the production of olive oil. By 2011, besides olive oil, it was producing only natural green soap powder for washing machines made from olive kernels; this product was finally discontinued, and ABEA turned to the production of green soap in bars and in liquid form in containers for personal use.

In 1994, ABEA's pomace oil and soap making plants were relocated to Keramia, a small municipality south of Chania. The year 2004 was a huge step for ABEA's olive oil production process. The olive oil press was relocated and modernized to the present-day location of Agrokipio, in the Municipality of Eleftherios Venizelos. In 2014, 51% of the company's stocks was bought over by the cooperative bank of Chania.

Although much of the old factory of the company has been demolished, its remains and especially the two standing chimneys, are considered by many to be important monuments of the social and urban history of Chania, and its culture. In 2016 Tassos Vamvoukas, the mayor of Chania, asked for the preservation of the chimneys, and to be formally acknowledged from the Greek Ministry of Culture as modern constructions of high cultural value. The case is still pending before the Greek Central Council for Modern Monuments.

== Awards and recognitions ==
In 2015, ABEA received a distinction in the 7th contest of extra virgin olive oil, "Excellence 2015", held at the hotel Divani Caravel. ABEA was also granted the bronze "Excellence 15" prize amongst 74 other samples and products.

In 2018 the industrial complex of company with its founder, the French chemist Jules Dey, was awarded the EurChemS (European Chemical Society) Historical Landmark Award along with the Ytterby mine in Sweden. The award is considered to honor locations in Europe which played a significant role in the history of chemistry.

Here is a list of other awards and recognitions ABEA has won:

- TUV Hellas System Certification ISO 22000
- TUV Hellas System Certification ISO 9001

== Products ==
ABEA specializes in producing two main areas of production: olive oil and soap. It produces four kinds of olive oils and four kinds of soap items.
