= Pyrognomic =

Pyrognomic materials are said to become visibly incandescent at relatively low temperatures. In practice, virtually all solid or liquid substances start to visibly incandesce around 798 K (525 °C; 977 °F), with a mildly dull red color, whether or not a chemical reaction takes place that produces light as a result of an exothermic process. This limit is called the Draper point. The incandescence does not vanish below that temperature, but it is too weak in the visible spectrum to be perceivable. Pyrognomic materials are thought to visibly incandesce at much lower temperatures than the Draper point but a material with this property has never been proven to exist. Allanite and gadolinite are examples of minerals which have been claimed to exhibit true pyrognomic properties but have since been shown to exhibit thermoluminescence. The term was originally introduced by the German chemist and mineralogist Theodor Scheerer (1813-1873) in 1840, but the phenomenon had been previously observed by William Hyde Wollaston and Jöns Jacob Berzelius. The term is still used today to describe the thermoluminescence exhibited by various metamict minerals.
