= Carl Axel Arrhenius =

Swedish military officer, geologist and chemist (1757–1824)

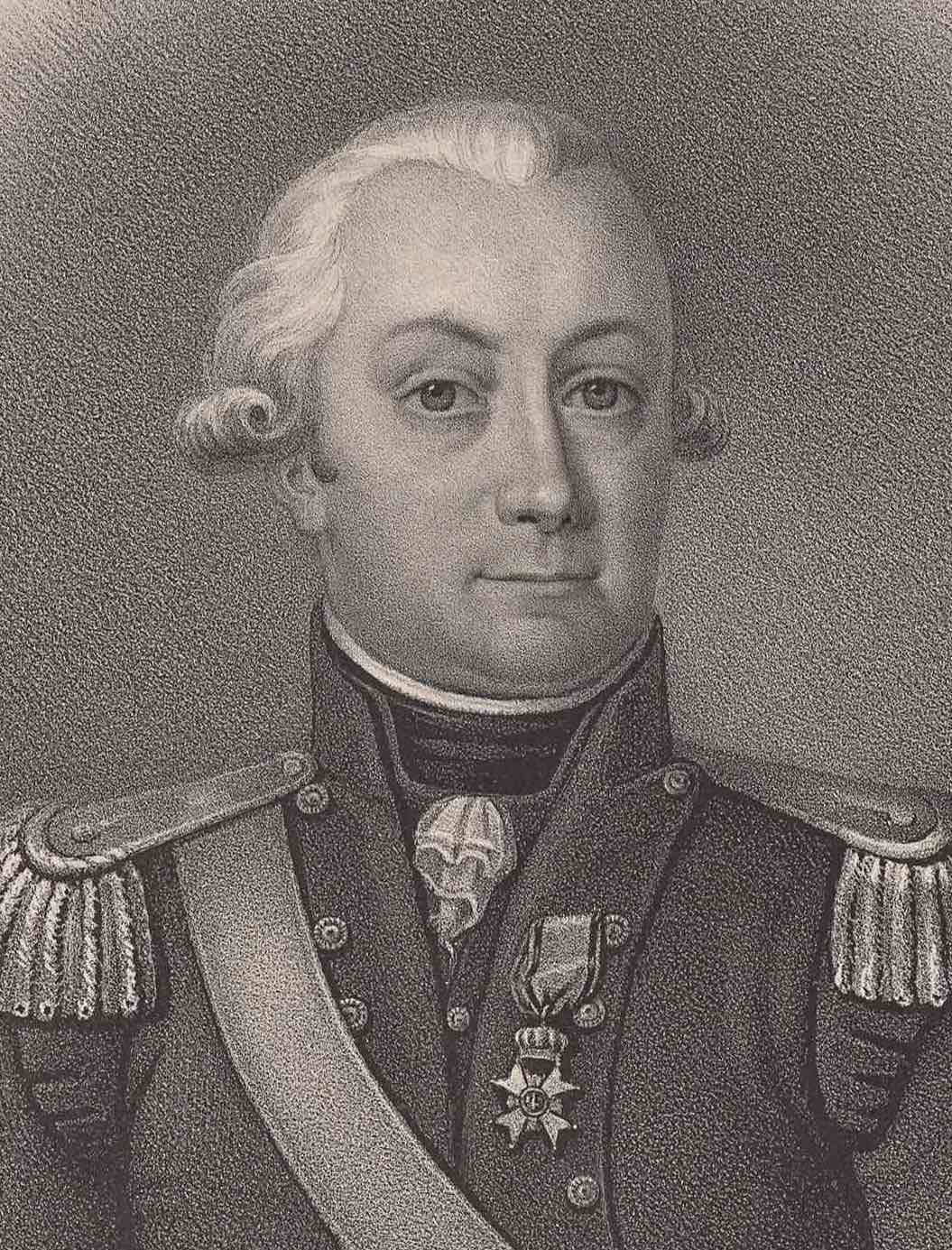
- Born: 29 March 1757; Stockholm, Sweden
- Died: 20 November 1824 (aged 67)
- Known for: Discovery of ytterbite
- Scientific career
- Fields: Geology, chemistry

Carl Axel Arrhenius (29 March 1757 – 20 November 1824) was a Swedish military officer, geologist, and chemist. He is best known for his discovery of the mineral ytterbite (later called gadolinite) in 1787.

The discovery of ytterbite was the first step in identifying an entire group of previously unknown elements, the rare earths. Eight stable rare earth elements were eventually extracted from ytterbite: terbium, dysprosium, holmium, erbium, thulium, ytterbium, lutetium, and yttrium.

== Early life ==
Arrhenius was born on 29 March 1757, in Stockholm, the son of Jakob Larsson Arrhenius and Brita Sofia (née Georgii) Arrhenius. In 1796, he married Gustafva von Bilang.

== Career ==
Arrhenius became a lieutenant of the Svea Artillery Regiment of the Swedish army, the regiment being stationed in Vaxholm. As an artillery officer, Arrhenius was assigned to study the characteristics of gunpowder at the Swedish Royal Mint's (Kungliga Myntet) laboratory. Being taught to test gunpowder by Bengt Reinhold Geijer and Peter Jacob Hjelm at the Royal Mint sparked his interest in chemistry and mineralogy, and this experience served as the beginning of his chemical studies. During this time, in 1787, he discovered the mineral ytterbite (later renamed gadolinite).

In 1787, Arrhenius accompanied Carl Bernhard Wadström and Anders Sparrman on a visit for scientific investigations in Senegal. Returning from Senegal in 1787–1788, Arrhenius met French chemist Antoine Lavoisier during a layover in Paris, France. He became an ardent proponent in Sweden of Lavoisier's new theories of oxygenation and combustion. Lavoisier extensively researched combustion, including that of gunpowder, leading to significant improvements of the quality of this explosive. This advance was of natural interest to Arrhenius.

Arrhenius then took part in the campaign against Russia in 1788, in which he distinguished himself militarily. He was promoted to major in 1801, and later to Feldzeugmeister. He was put in command of the manufacture and inspection of gunpowder for the Swedish army in 1816.

Arrhenius became a member of the Royal Swedish Academy of War Sciences in 1799, and of the Royal Swedish Academy of Sciences in 1817. He regretted that he had to spend most of his time in "the occupations of practical life" and could not devote himself to studying chemistry. In 1816–1817, then more than sixty years of age, Arrhenius attended the classes of chemist Jöns Jacob Berzelius, continuing his studies of chemistry.

Arrhenius died on 20 November 1824, aged 67.

== Ytterbite ==
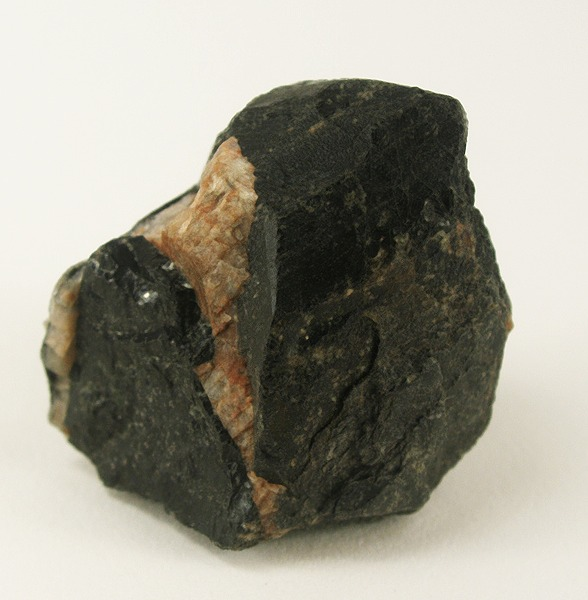
A sample of ytterbite (later named gadolinite) from Vaxholm

During his time as a lieutenant in Vaxholm, Arrhenius visited the feldspar mine in the village of Ytterby on the island of Resarön. During this visit, in 1787, he found an unusually heavy dark mineral. The mineral's first description was published by Bengt Reinhold Geijer in Crell's Annalen in 1788, where he credited Arrhenius with the discovery of a "Schwerstein" or "heavy rock".

The mineral was eventually sent to the chemist Johan Gadolin at the Royal Academy of Åbo (Turku) for suitable analysis. In 1794, after careful chemical analysis, Gadolin reported that approximately 38% of the sample was a previously unknown "earth". (The idea of chemical element was not yet established.) The compound that Gadolin isolated, the first rare-earth metal compound, is now known as Yttrium(III) oxide. It is composed of the first known rare-earth element, yttrium. Examining a different sample, Anders Gustaf Ekeberg confirmed the existence of a new "earth", calling it "yttria" and the source mineral "ytterbite". The mineral that Arrhenius discovered and Gadolin and Ekeberg analyzed was eventually renamed gadolinite in 1800.

The rare-earths are chemically very similar to each other, almost always occur together in minerals on earth and are rarely found in isolation from other rare-earth elements. Their similarity and co-existence made their initial identification difficult.

The discovery of ytterbite was the first step in a long process of investigations by many scientists in different countries. The identification of new "earths" extended over 100 years, and eventually led to the understanding of elements and their relationships in the periodic system. Ytterbite was eventually found to contain eight stable rare earth elements (terbium, dysprosium, holmium, erbium, thulium, ytterbium, lutetium, and yttrium). Most of the remaining rare earths were found in the mineral cerite, which contains seven rare earth elements (cerium, lanthanum, praseodymium, neodymium, samarium, europium, and gadolinium).
