= Ytterby =

Village in Sweden

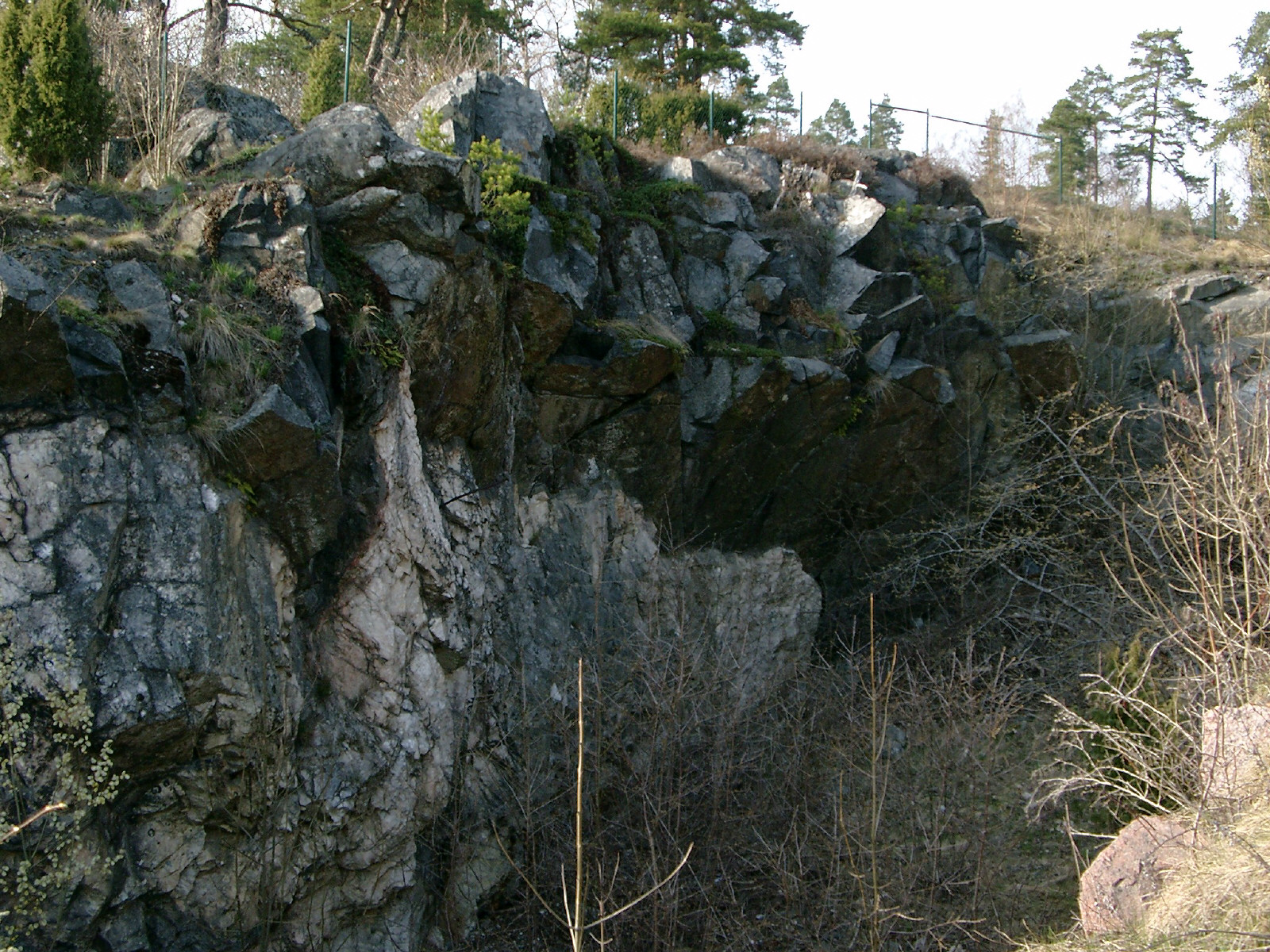
Ytterby quarry

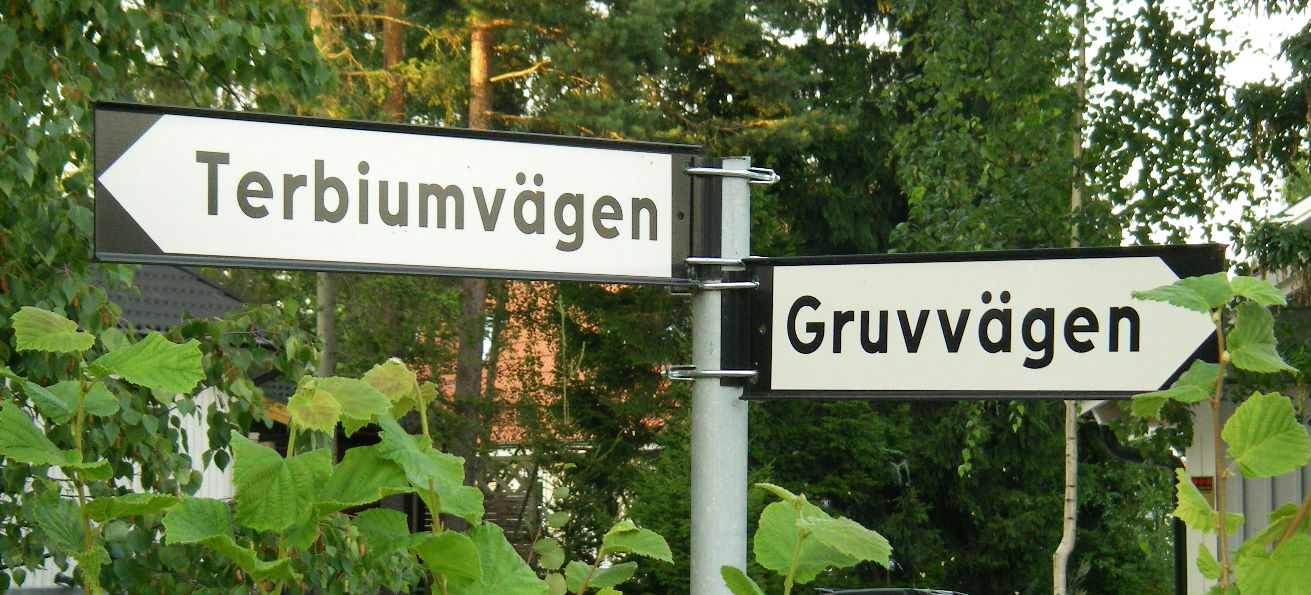
Terbiumvägen (Terbium Road) and Gruvvägen (Mine Road) close to the Ytterby mine (59.4265°N 18.3535°E)

Ytterby (Swedish pronunciation: [ˈʏ̂tːɛrˌbyː]) is a village on the Swedish island of Resarö, in Vaxholm Municipality in the Stockholm archipelago. Today the residential area is dominated by suburban homes.

The Swedish name of the village translates literally into "outer village". Ytterby is the single richest source of elemental discoveries in the world; the chemical elements yttrium (Y), terbium (Tb), erbium (Er), and ytterbium (Yb) are all named after Ytterby, and the elements holmium (Ho), scandium (Sc), thulium (Tm), tantalum (Ta), and gadolinium (Gd) were also first discovered there.

Local roads connect Ytterby to county road 274 and hence the mainland. Except for the winter months, passenger ships of the Waxholmsbolaget call at a pier in Ytterby, providing a connection to Vaxholm town and Stockholm. Ytterby is as well served by several local bus lines of the north east SL district, connecting the area directly to Stockholms östra railway station.

== Mine ==
Quartz was mined in the area beginning in the 1600s for the ironworks in Uppland. Feldspar was mined for local porcelain manufacture, such as Gustavsberg, and the porcelain trade with Britain and Poland. The mine is likely the first feldspar mine in Sweden, starting in 1790. Feldspar mining was likely sporadic and based on manufacture demand. This demand increased in the 1860s, leading to deeper mining efforts at Ytterby. The mine became one of the most productive quartz and feldspar mines in the country. Feldspar and quartz mining continued until 1933, when the mine was shut down. With 177 years of feldspar mining, it was the longest-mined feldspar mine in Sweden.

Towards the end of the 1940s, the Swedish state, through the REF (Riksnämnden för ekonomisk försvarsberedskap) became interested in the possible usage of the mine. In 1953, the mine was renovated and used for the storage of jet fuel, MC 77. The storage method led to contamination of the jet fuel, leading to problems in jet engines that used the fuel. The storage of jet fuel ended in 1978. It was subsequently used to store diesel. In 1995, the mine was emptied, and in the following years the area was rehabilitated.

The mined quartz and feldspar are part of a pegmatite dyke that has a NNE-SSW orientation and a dip of 60° to the west. The pegmatite dyke include sections of aplite and graphic granite. The surrounding host rock is "gabbro-like greenstone".

== Chemical discoveries ==
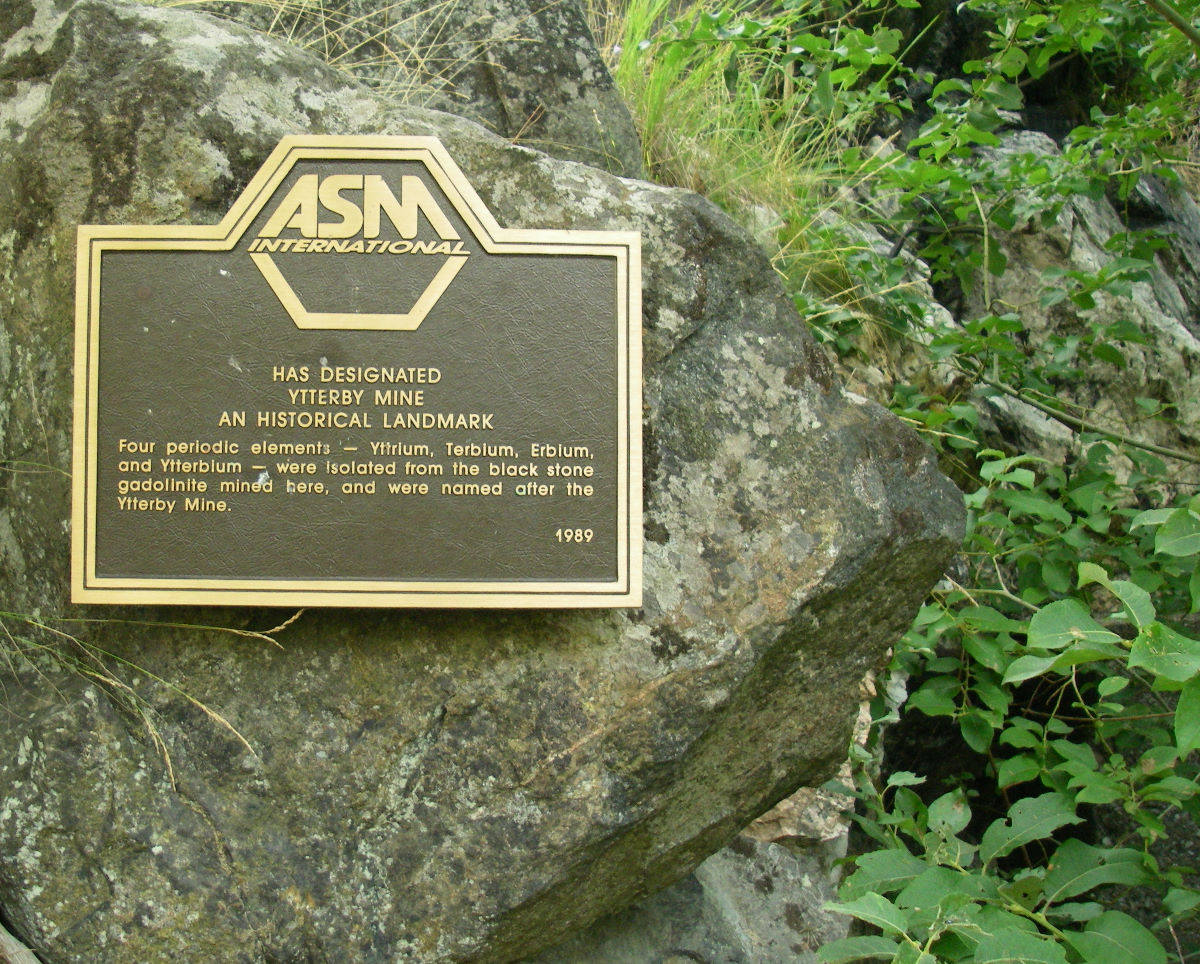
Plaque of the ASM International society at the entrance of Ytterby mine

The mine's elemental history began in 1787, when Lieutenant Carl Axel Arrhenius found an unidentified black mineral. He had previously explored the area for a potential fortification. His hobby interest in chemistry led him to notice the unusually heavy black rock, which he and his friend Bengt Geijer examined with Sven Rinman. It was not until 1794 that Finnish chemist Johan Gadolin fully analysed the mineral and found that 38% of its composition was a new, unidentified earth element. Swedish chemist Anders Gustaf Ekeberg confirmed the discovery the following year and named it yttria, with the mineral named gadolinite.

Many rare earth elements were discovered in the mineral gadolinite, which eventually proved to be the source of seven new elements that were named after the mineral ore and the area. These elements include yttrium (Y), erbium (Er), terbium (Tb) and ytterbium (Yb), which were first described in 1794, 1843, 1843, and 1878, respectively. In 1989 the ASM International society installed a plaque at the former entrance to the mine, commemorating the mine as a historical landmark.

In addition, scandium (Sc) and three other lanthanides—holmium (Ho, named after Stockholm), thulium (Tm, named after Thule, a mythic analogue of Scandinavia), and gadolinium (Gd, after the chemist Johan Gadolin)—can trace their discovery to the same quarry. The transition metal tantalum (Ta, after the Greek mythological figure Tantalus) was also discovered in a mineral sample from Ytterby in 1802.

The European Chemical Society gave the Ytterby mine and the industrial complex of ABEA, Crete, Greece its Historical Landmarks Awards for 2018.

== See also ==
- Timeline of chemical element discoveries
- Geography of Stockholm
