= Johan Gadolin =

Finnish chemist (1760–1852)

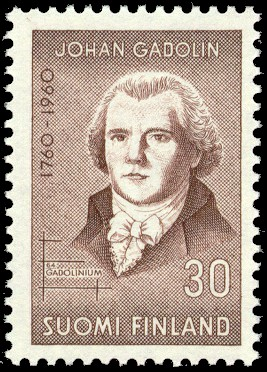
- Postage stamp depicting Gadolin
- Born: 5 June 1760; Turku, Swedish Finland
- Died: 15 August 1852 (aged 92); Mynämäki, Grand Duchy of Finland, Russian Empire
- Education: Royal Academy of Turku, Uppsala University
- Known for: Discovering yttrium, eponym of gadolinium and gadolinite
- Scientific career
- Fields: Chemistry
- Workplaces: Royal Academy of Turku
- Thesis: Dissertatio chemica de analysi ferri (Chemical dissertation on the analysis of iron)
- Doctoral advisor: Torbern Bergman

Johan Gadolin (5 June 1760 – 15 August 1852) was a Finnish chemist, physicist and mineralogist. Gadolin discovered a "new earth" containing the first rare-earth compound yttrium, which was later determined to be a chemical element. He is also considered the founder of Finnish chemistry research, as the second holder of the Chair of Chemistry at the Royal Academy of Turku (or Åbo Kungliga Akademi). Gadolin was ennobled for his achievements and awarded the Order of Saint Vladimir and the Order of Saint Anna.

== Early life and education ==
Johan Gadolin was born in Turku (Swedish name Åbo), Finland (then a part of Sweden). Johan was the son of Jakob Gadolin, professor of physics and theology at Turku. Johan began to study mathematics at the Royal Academy of Turku (Åbo Kungliga Akademi) when he was fifteen. Later he changed his major to chemistry, studying with Pehr Adrian Gadd, the first chair of chemistry at Turku.

In 1779 Gadolin moved to Uppsala University. In 1781, he published his dissertation Dissertatio chemica de analysi ferri ("Chemical dissertation on the analysis of iron"), under the direction of Torbern Bergman. Bergman founded an important research school, and many of his students, including Gadolin, Johan Gottlieb Gahn, and Carl Wilhelm Scheele, became close friends.

== Career ==
Gadolin was fluent in Latin, Finnish, Russian, German, English and French in addition to his native Swedish. He was a candidate for the chair of chemistry at Uppsala in 1784, but Johann Afzelius was selected instead. Gadolin became an extraordinary professor at Åbo in 1785 (an unpaid position). Beginning in 1786, he made a chemical "grand tour" of Europe, visiting universities and mines in various countries. He worked with Lorenz Crell, editor of the journal Chemische Annalen in Germany, and with Adair Crawford and Richard Kirwan in Ireland.

Gadolin was elected a member of the Royal Swedish Academy of Sciences in 1790.

Gadolin became the ordinary professor of chemistry at the Royal Academy of Turku in 1797, after the death of Pehr Adrian Gadd. He retained the position until his retirement in 1822. He was one of the first chemists who gave laboratory exercises to students. He even allowed the students to use his private laboratory.

== Chemical achievements ==
Gadolin made contributions in a variety of areas.

Although he never visited France, he became a proponent of Antoine Lavoisier's theory of combustion. Gadolin's Inledning till Chemien (1798) was the first chemistry textbook in the Nordic countries that questioned the theory of phlogiston and discussed the role of oxygen in combustion in a modern way.

=== Studies of heat ===
Gadolin studied the relationship of heat to chemical changes, in particular, the ability of different substances to absorb heat (specific heat) and the absorption of heat during state changes (latent heat). This thermochemical work required extremely precise measurements. Gadolin published important papers on specific heat by 1784, and on the latent heat of steam in 1791. He demonstrated that the heat of ice was equal to the heat of snow, and published a standard set of heat tables.

The best series of experiments on the distribution of heat among different bodies was performed before the year 1784 by Professor Gadolin of Åbo, who, rejecting the notion of Capacity, introduced the unexceptionable expression, Specific Heat. One of the most beautiful consequences derived from this theory, was the determination of the absolute zero or lowest point in the scale of Heat.

=== Yttrium, the first rare-earth element ===
Namesakes

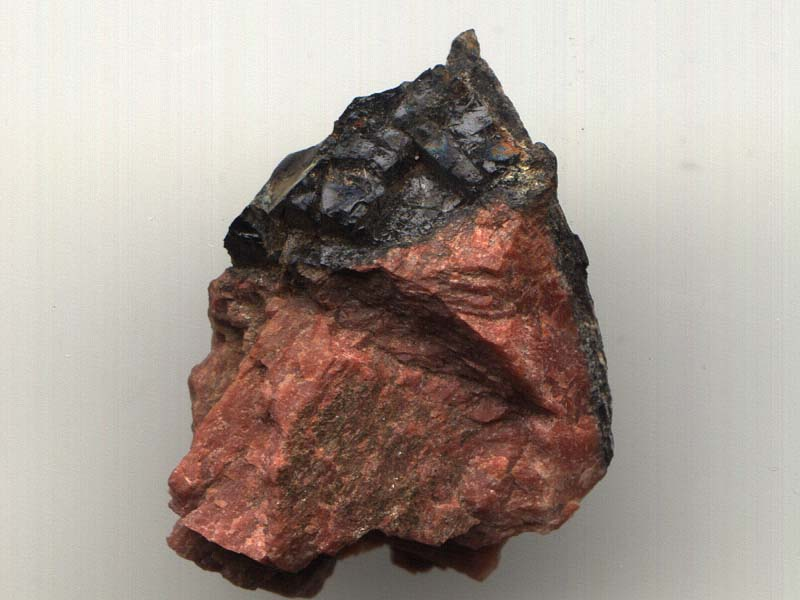
Gadolinite

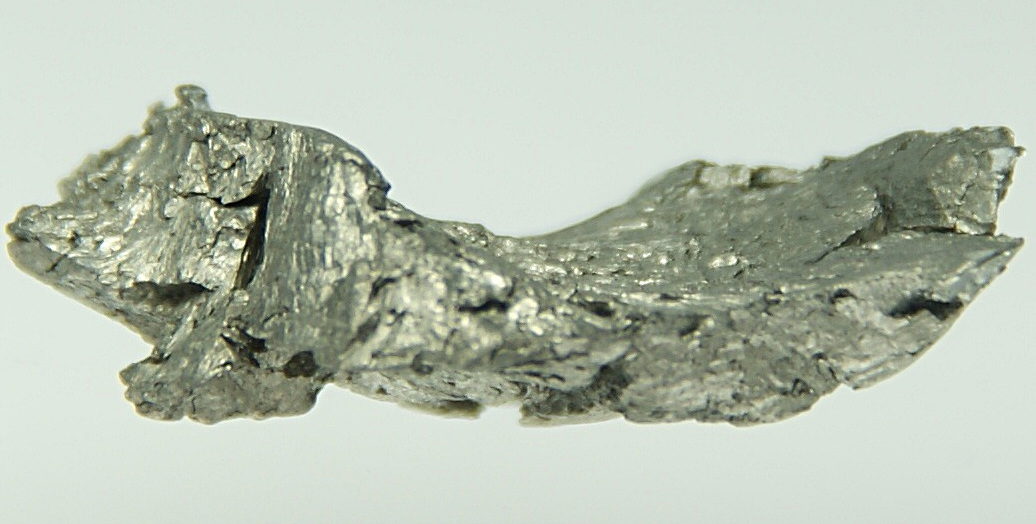
Gadolinium

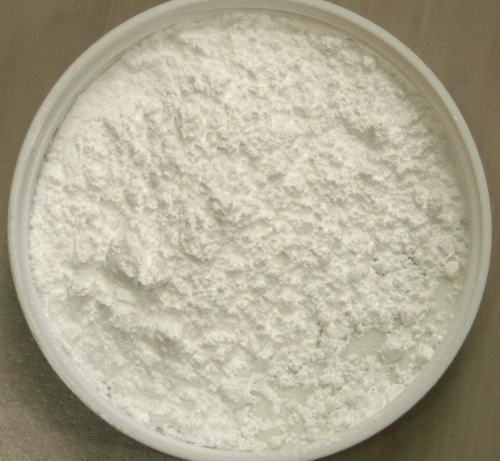
Gadolinia (powder)

Gadolin became famous for his description of the first rare-earth element, yttrium. In 1792 Gadolin received a sample of black, heavy mineral found in a quarry in a Swedish village Ytterby near Stockholm by Carl Axel Arrhenius. By careful experiments, Gadolin determined that approximately 38% of the sample was a previously unknown "earth", an oxide which was later named yttria. Yttria, or yttrium oxide, was the first known rare-earth metal compound—at that time, it was not yet regarded as an element in the modern sense. His work was published in 1794.

The mineral that Gadolin examined was named gadolinite in 1800. Well after his death, the discoverers of the element gadolinium and its oxide gadolinia named them after Gadolin.

In an earlier paper in 1788 Gadolin showed that the same element can show several oxidation states, in his case Sn(II) and Sn(IV) 'by combining itself with larger or smaller amounts of the calcinating substance'. He described the disproportionation reaction:

2 Sn(II) ⇌ Sn(0) + Sn(IV).

=== Analytical chemistry ===
A private first day cover, Finland, honoring Johan Gadolin.

Having established the composition of Prussian blue, Gadolin suggested a method for precipitating ferrous iron as ferro ferricyanide, preceding the work of Gay-Lussac by forty years.

Reports of many of Gadolin's chemical investigations appeared in German in Crell's Chemische Annalen für die Freunde der Naturlehre, Arzneygelahrheit, Haushaltungskeit und Manufacturen. In 1825 he published Systema fossilium analysibus chemicis examinatorum secundum partium constitutivarum rationes ordinatorium, a system of mineral classification based upon chemical principles. The introduction outlines Gadolin's theories, and the text presents mineral species in a systematic ordering.

One of Gadolin's latest studies was the chemical analysis of the Chinese alloy pak tong in 1810 and 1827. Also known as alpacca or German silver, it was a less expensive silver substitute often containing copper, zinc, nickel, and tin.

Gadolin is also famous for publishing one of the earliest examples of counter-current condensers. In 1791 he improved a condenser design of his father's by using the "counter-current principle". By requiring water coolant to flow uphill, the effectiveness of the condenser was increased. This principle was later used by Justus Liebig, in what is today usually referred to as a Liebig condenser.

== Awards ==
External image
- https://www.numericana.com/arms/gadolin.htm

Gadolin was knighted and is registered under number 245 in the Finnish House of Nobility. He was also awarded the Order of Saint Vladimir and the Order of Saint Anna. His heraldic device was:

Argent, on a bend Azure with two mullets Or between a rose Gules and crystals Proper.

== Later life ==
Johan Gadolin married first, at age 35, Hedvig Tihleman, with whom he had nine children. After his wife's death he married, at age 59, Ebba Palander. Gadolin retired as professor emeritus in 1822 at age 62, a mandatory age of retirement. He moved to a country estate where he lived for another 30 years. He died in Mynämäki, Finland on 15 August 1852.

The Great Fire of Turku of 1827 started in a bakery and damaged or destroyed much of the town of Åbo. Gadolin's laboratory and collection of minerals near the cathedral were destroyed.
