= Anders Gustaf Ekeberg =

Swedish analytical chemist (1767–1813)

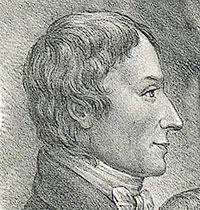
- Born: 16 January 1767; Stockholm, Sweden
- Died: 11 February 1813 (aged 46); Uppsala, Sweden
- Known for: Discovering tantalum

Anders Gustaf Ekeberg (16 January 1767 in Stockholm, Sweden – 11 February 1813 in Uppsala, Sweden) was a Swedish analytical chemist who discovered tantalum in 1802. Notably, he was deaf.

== Education ==
Anders Gustav Ekeberg was a Swedish scientist, mathematician and expert in Greek literature. His father, Joseph Erik Ekeberg, was a shipbuilder. His uncle was Carl Gustaf Ekeberg.

Anders Gustav Ekeberg attended school at Kalmar, Söderåkra, Vestervik, and Karlskrona. He was a gifted student and enrolled at Uppsala University in 1784, graduating in 1788. His thesis addressed the extraction of oils from seeds. In 1789 and 1790, he traveled and studied in Germany, hearing Martin Heinrich Klaproth lecture in Berlin as well as Christian Ehrenfried Weigel in Greifswald.

== Career ==
In 1794, Anders Gustav Ekeberg began teaching at Uppsala. He was a supporter of Antoine Lavoisier's proposals for systematizing chemical nomenclature. In 1795 he and Pehr von Afzelius published the first article to introduce the modern names for chemical elements such as hydrogen, nitrogen, and oxygen into the Swedish language, "On the Present State of Chemical Sciences".

He was made docent in chemistry in 1794 and experimentator (laborator) in 1799, working as a demonstrator in the laboratory of Torbern Bergman. In 1798 he lectured on the theory of combustion. In 1799, he was elected a member of the Royal Swedish Academy of Sciences.

Ekeberg had poor health throughout his life. During his childhood a severe cold had impaired his hearing, which was further weakened over the years, so that it hindered his teaching activities. Subsequently, a gas explosion blinded him in one eye.

Ekeberg was portrayed by his friends and students as a kind and gentle man. He died, unmarried, at the age of 46.

== Research ==
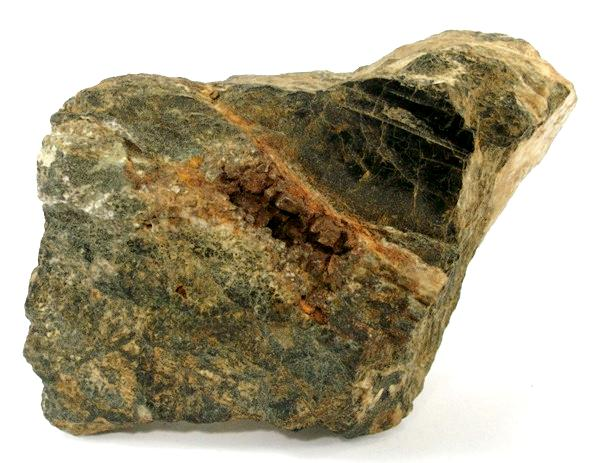
The mineral yttrotantalite from Ytterby

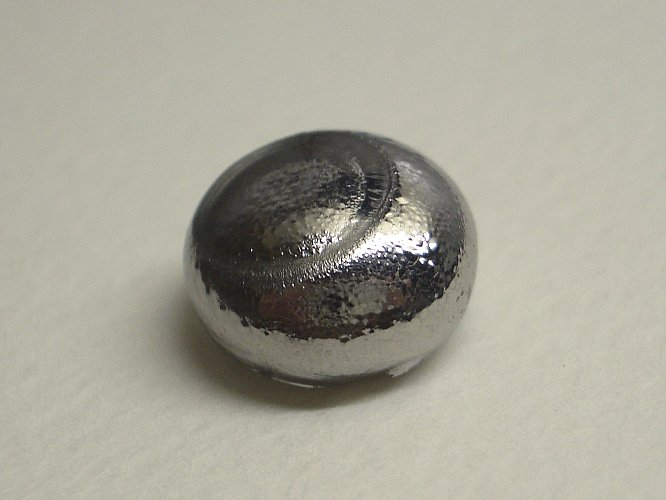
The element tantalum

Ekeberg analyzed a number of the minerals found at Ytterby and Falun. In 1802 he analyzed specimens of tantalite from Kimito, Finland, and of yttrotantalite from Ytterby, Sweden. He is credited with finding the element tantalum in both.

Ekeberg named the new element after the mythical Ancient Greek demigod Tantalus. According to legend, he was condemned to eternal frustration when he had to stand in water up to his neck, but the water receded as he attempted to drink.

== The Anders Gustaf Ekeberg Tantalum Prize ==
In 2018 the Tantalum-Niobium International Study Center established The Anders Gustaf Ekeberg Tantalum Prize ("Ekeberg Prize"), an annual award to recognize excellence in tantalum research. The Prize will increase awareness of the many unique properties of tantalum products and the applications in which they excel. The inaugural winner of the Ekeberg Prize was Yuri Freeman, for his book "Tantalum and Niobium-Based Capacitors" (Springer, 2018).
