= Earth (historical chemistry) =

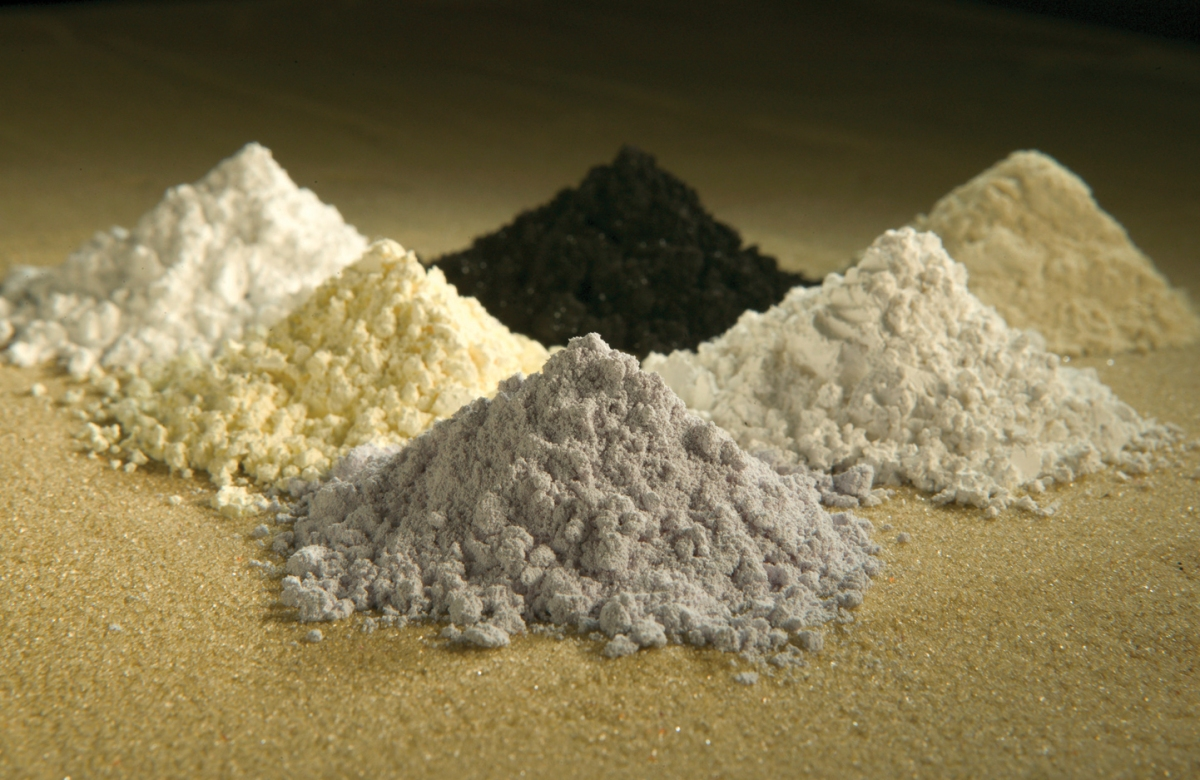
These rare-earth oxides are used as tracers to determine which parts of a watershed are eroding. Clockwise from top center: praseodymium, cerium, lanthanum, neodymium, samarium, and gadolinium.

Earths were defined by the Ancient Greeks as "materials that could not be changed further by the sources of heat then available". Several oxides were thought to be earths, such as aluminum oxide and magnesium oxide. It was not discovered until 1808 that these are not elements but metallic oxides.

== See also ==
- Rare earth metals
- Alkaline earth metals
