= Gadolinite =

Nesosilicate mineral

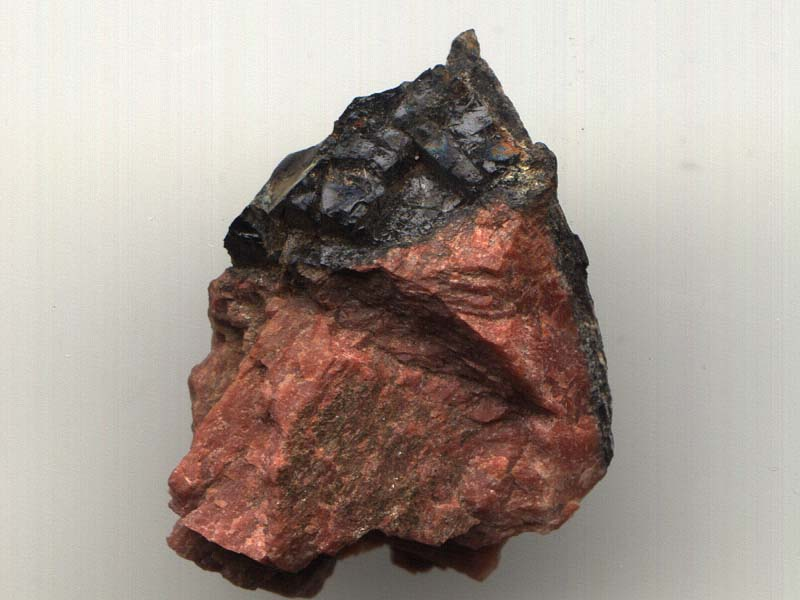
- Gadolinite (black portion at top)

General
- Category: Nesosilicate
- Formula: (Ce,La,Nd,Y)_{2}FeBe_{2}Si_{2}O_{10}
- IMA symbol: Gad
- Strunz classification: 9.AJ.20
- Crystal system: Monoclinic
- Crystal class: Prismatic (2/m) (same H-M symbol)
- Space group: P2_{1}/n

Gadolinite, sometimes known as ytterbite, is a silicate mineral consisting principally of the silicates of cerium, lanthanum, neodymium, yttrium, beryllium, and iron with the formula (Ce,La,Nd,Y)_{2}FeBe_{2}Si_{2}O_{10}. It is called gadolinite-(Ce) or gadolinite-(Y), depending on the prominent composing element (Y if yttrium predominates, and Ce if cerium). It may contain 35.5% yttria sub-group rare earths, 2.2% ceria earths, as much as to 11.6% BeO, and traces of thorium. It is found in Sweden, Norway, and the US (Texas and Colorado).

== Characteristics ==
Gadolinite is fairly rare and typically occurs as well-formed crystals. It is nearly black in color and has a vitreous luster. The hardness is between 6.5 and 7 on the Mohs scale, and the specific gravity is between 4.0 and 4.7. It fractures in a conchoidal pattern and streaks grayish-green. It was also thought to exhibit pyrognomic properties, as it can emit visible light when heated to relatively low temperatures, but the scientific consensus is that this is the product of thermoluminescence.

== Name and discovery ==
Gadolinite was named in 1800 for Johan Gadolin, the Finnish mineralogist-chemist who first isolated an oxide of the rare-earth element yttrium from the mineral in 1792. The rare earth gadolinium was also named after him. However, gadolinite does not contain more than trace amounts of gadolinium. When Gadolin analyzed this mineral, he missed an opportunity to discover a second element: the element he thought was aluminium (alumina) was in fact beryllium (beryllia), an element that was not officially identified until 1798.

Several elements were discovered as a consequence of lengthy analysis and decomposition of the ore gadolinite. As the ore was progressively analysed, the residue was first given the label ceria, then lanthana, and subsequently yttria, erbia, and terbia. In order of date discovered, the list of elements includes cerium, lanthanum, erbium, terbium, yttrium, ytterbium, holmium, thulium, scandium, praseodymium, neodymium and dysprosium. Several of these new elements were either discovered or isolated by Carl Gustaf Mosander in the 1830s and 1840s.

== Uses ==
Gadolinite and euxenite are quite abundant and are future sources of yttrium sub group rare earths. At present, these elements are recovered from monazite concentrates (after recovery of ceria sub-group metals).

== See also ==
- List of minerals
- List of minerals named after people
