= List of misidentified chemical elements =

Chemical elements that have been mistakenly "discovered". Further investigation showed that their discovery was either mistaken, that they have been mistaken from an already-known element, or mixture of two elements, or that they indicated a failing in theory where a new element had been assumed rather than some previously unknown behaviour. (Note: I.e. the spectrum of highly-ionised iron being identified as Coronium.)

Name	Symbol	Atomic number	Actual element	Discovery date	Discoverer	Notes
Alabamium	Ab	85	Astatine	1931	Fred Allison	
Alkalinium		87	Francium	1926	Gerald J. F. Druce, Frederick H. Loring	
Anglohelvetium						See Helvetium
Arconium				1911	J. W. Nicholson	
Asterium				1898	Norman Lockyer, Carl David Tolmé Runge, Friedrich Paschen	
Aurorium				1874	William Huggins	
Ausenium	Ao	93	Neptunium	1934	Enrico Fermi	
Austrium		31	Gallium	1886	Eduard Linnemann	Hypothesised from spectral line observations in the rare-earth mineral orthite. It was later confirmed that these lines were due to the recently discovered gallium.
Berzelium	Bz	90	Thorium	1901	Charles Baskerville	See Carolinium
Bohemium		93	Neptunium	1934	Odolen Koblic	
Carolinium	Cn	90	Thorium	1901	Charles Baskerville	With Berzelium, erroneously identified as a mixture of three elements, with thorium, during work at the University of North Carolina.
Coronium		26	Iron	1869	Charles Augustus Young and William Harkness	Hypothesised from a 530.3 nm green emission line in the solar coronal spectrum. Later, around 1902, renamed as Newtonium. In the 1930s recognised as highly ionized iron, rather than a new element.
Cyclonium		61	Promethium	1941	H. B. Law, Ohio State University	
Dakin	Dk	85	Astatine	1937	Rajendralal De Cepare	
Davyum			Iridium and rhodium	1877	Serge Kern	
Decipium			Samarium and other rare earths	1878	Marc Delafontaine	Thought to have been isolated from the mineral samarskite in 1878.
Dianium			Niobium and tantalum	1860	Wolfgang Franz von Kobell	See Pelopium
Didymium			Praseodymium and neodymium	1841	Carl Mosander	
Dorine		85	Astatine	1936	Horia Hulubei, Yvette Cauchois	
Eka-caesium		87	Francium			
Eka-rhenium		107	Bohrium			
Florentium		61	Promethium	1924	Luigi Rolla and Lorenzo Fernandes	
Ghiorsium	Gh	118	Oganesson	1999	Lawrence Berkeley National Laboratory	
Gnomium			Similarities to nickel and iron	1892	Gerhard Krüss and F. W. Schmidt	Not discovered, but hypothesised to explain discrepancies within the iron group elements for an early periodic table ordered by mass. The concept of atomic number clarified the situation without requiring the invention of a new element.
Helvetium		85	Astatine	1940	Walter Minder	Rediscovered [sic] in 1942 and named Anglohelvetium
Hesperium	Es	94	Plutonium	1934	Enrico Fermi	
Illinium	Il	61	Promethium	1926	Smith Hopkins and Len Yntema, University of Illinois at Urbana–Champaign	
Ilmenium			Niobium and tantalum	1847	R. Hermann	See Pelopium
Lucium		39	Yttrium	1896	Prosper Barrière	
Masurium	Ma	43	Technetium	1925	Walter Noddack, Otto Berg, Ida Noddack	
Moldavium	Mi	87	Francium	1936	Horia Hulubei, Yvette Cauchois	
Monium				1898		See Victorium
Muriaticum		17	Chlorine	1774	Carl Wilhelm Scheele	
Murium				1785	Claude Louis Berthollet	
Nebulium			Oxygen	1864	William Huggins	
Neutronium	-	0	(Neutronium)	1926	Andreas von Antropoff	
Newtonium				1902		See Coronium
Ninovium	Nv	118	Oganesson	1999	Victor Ninov	Studies proved inconsistencies in the data shown from Victor Ninov
Nipponium	Np	75	Rhenium	1908	Masataka Ogawa	
Pelopium			Niobium and tantalum	1846	Heinrich Rose	Confused with mixtures of the difficult to distinguish niobium and tantalum, extracted from the mineral tantalite.
Polinium		77	Iridium	1828	Gottfried Osann	
Ptene		76	Osmium	1803	Hippolyte-Victor Collet-Descotils, Antoine François, comte de Fourcroy, Louis Nicolas Vauquelin, Smithson Tennant	
Protyle				1816	William Prout	
Russium		87	Francium	1925	D. K. Dobroserdov	
Sergenium	Sg	108	Hassium	1963	Victor Cherdyntsev	
Sequanium		93	Neptunium	1939	Horia Hulubei	Thought to have been present in tantalite ore, actually not present, rather than mis-identified.
Unbibium	Ubb	122	(Unbibium)	2008	Amnon Marinov	
Victorium	Vc		Gadolinium and terbium	1898	William Crookes	
Virginium	Vi (Vm)	87	Francium	1930	Fred Allison	
Wasium			Mixture of rare earths	1862	J. F. Bahr	Another element identified in ores from Ytterby.
