= List of discredited substances =

This is a list of substances or materials generally considered discredited.

A substance can be discredited in one of three ways:

1. It was widely believed to exist at one time but no longer is. Such substances are often part of an obsolete scientific theory.
2. It was once believed to have drastically different properties from those accepted now. It was widely claimed and believed to possess significant properties that are no longer attributed to it.
3. It is currently believed to exist as part of a theory that has not met the theoretical and experimental requirements of mainstream science. In particular, such a theory must be predictive.

== Substances whose existence is discredited ==
Substance	Theorized by	From when	Alleged definition	Discredited by
Aether (classical element)		Ancient times	The medium filling the universe above the terrestrial sphere enabling transmission of light and gravity	The Michelson–Morley experiment
Alicorn		Ancient times	The horn of the unicorn, has mystical healing properties	Never found
Alkahest	Paracelsus	1493–1541	A universal solvent, which can dissolve every other substance, including gold	Never found (note that aqua regia can dissolve gold, but not everything)
Andrewsite	Thomas Andrews	1871–1990	Green mineral named for Thomas Andrews	Confirmation in 1990 that the substance is composed of other minerals
Caloric	Antoine Lavoisier	1783	Weightless fluid, the substance of heat	Heat came to be interpreted as the energy of the motion of atoms
Coronium	Charles Augustus Young and William Harkness	1869	Chemical element in the solar corona	In the 1930s, Walter Grotrian and Bengt Edlén discovered that the spectral line in question was due to highly ionized iron
Élan vital	Henri Bergson	1907	Substance or force bearing the property of life	Molecular biology
Elixir of life	Mythology	Ancient times	Substance believed by alchemists to confer immortality	Never found
Erototoxins	Judith Reisman	after 1955	Addictive chemicals produced in the brain by pornography	Addictive opioids (i.e. endorphins) in the brain are related to pleasure in general, not specific to pornography
Luminiferous aether		18th century	Medium for the propagation of light	Michelson–Morley experiment
Miasma		Ancient times	Foul smell believed to carry diseases	Modern biology, in particular the discovery of actual infectious agents
Nebulium	William Huggins	1864	An element in the Cat's Eye Nebula	In 1927, Ira Sprague Bowen showed that the observed spectral lines are emitted by doubly ionized oxygen
N-rays	Prosper-René Blondlot	1903	A form of radiation emitted by most substances	A simple null experiment, where Blondlot thought he could see the effects of N-rays even when an essential component had been removed from the experimental apparatus
Odic force	Carl Reichenbach	1845	Force bearing the property of life	Lack of experimental evidence and any predictive theory; never accepted by science
Orgone energy	Wilhelm Reich	1930s	Energy bearing the property of life	Lack of experimental evidence and any predictive theory; never accepted by science
Panacea	Alchemists	Ancient times	Substance curing all illness	Modern biology and medicine
Philosopher's stone	Alchemists	Ancient times	Legendary substance that could transmute lead into precious metals	Transmutation requires nuclear processes. The first synthesis of gold was conducted by Japanese physicist Hantaro Nagaoka in 1924, who synthesized gold by bombarding mercury with neutrons.
Phlogiston	Johann Joachim Becher	1667	Weightless substance present in combustible materials and released when they are burned	Modern chemistry, specifically the discovery that combustion is the combination of various substances with oxidizers, most commonly oxygen
Polywater		late 1960s	A polymerised form of water	More careful experiments with rigorously cleaned glassware showed that it was just contaminated water
Ptomaines			Alkaloids found in decaying matter thought to cause food poisoning	Discovery of bacteria (Germ theory of disease)
Red mercury	Hoax	1979	Controversial substance supposedly of use to terrorists	Its actual nature, if any, is unclear. The notion may have been invented for use by Soviet and Russian sting operations targeting nuclear materials trafficking. It is also possible that the phrase may have originated as a codeword in Soviet nuclear weapons development, much as the word "copper" was once used to obfuscate "plutonium" during the Manhattan Project.

== Substances whose properties are discredited ==
This is not to be construed as implying that these items–as they are understood today–are discredited. What is listed are fire, water, metal, etc. as universal principles or fundamentals.

- Classical elements and Chinese elements discredited by atomic theory and nuclear physics.
  - Fire (classical element)
  - Water (classical element)
  - Earth (classical element)
  - Air (classical element)
  - Wood (classical element)
  - Metal (classical element)
  - Aether (classical element): Now known not to exist (see above)
- The four bodily humours: Blood, Phlegm, Black Bile, and Yellow Bile. Fluids believed to determine health and character. Discredited by modern biology, including discovery of hormones.
- The tria prima of Paracelsus and later alchemy: Salt, Mercury and Sulphur. Discredited by modern chemistry (the atomic theory and modern understanding of elements and compounds).

== See also ==
- List of fictional elements, materials, isotopes and subatomic particles
- List of misidentified chemical elements
