= Osann =

Osann is a surname of German origin. Notable people with the surname include:

- Emil Osann (1787–1842), German physician and physiologist
- Friedrich Gotthilf Osann (1794–1858), German classical philologist, brother of Emil and Gottfried
- Gottfried Osann (1796–1866), German chemist and physicist, brother of Emil and Friedrich
- Kate Osann, American cartoonist

== See also ==
- Osann-Monzel, a municipality in Rhineland-Palatinate, Germany
