= Ghana National Agricultural Export =

Ghana National Agricultural Export is the agricultural arm of the government of Ghana Republic aimed at exporting major agricultural nuts and also their growth, maintenance and care-taking. The products mainly exported by this agricultural arm of the government of the Republic of Ghana include cashew nuts, cocoa seeds/beans, peanuts, ground nuts etc. and augmented agricultural benefits from tillage as gold and red mercury.

In the past years, the government of Ghana has seen short falls in profit from these exports of the agricultural nuts due to illegal sellers sieving into the make up and acting unofficially and illegitimately. However, on the creation of Ghana National Agricultural Export much light has been frayed into the economy, financial growth and world standard of the Republic of Ghana. The Ghana National Agricultural Export has drastically contributed to the growth and economy of the Ghana nation from a monitored, checked and properly executed policies, procedures and regulations.

In 2024, Ghana banned grain exports due to looming food shortages. The move was aimed to ensure food security and sustainability in Africa, particularly in countries with vast agricultural potential but struggling with food insecurity.

Some African countries see bans as crucial as they have been net importers of agricultural products over the last three decades, with cereal grains being the leading imported product. In 2016, Africa imported about $35 billion worth of food, while 73 million people faced acute food insecurity.
