= Giorgio Piccardi =

Italian chemist (1895–1972)

Giorgio Piccardi (13 October 1895 – 22 December 1972) was an Italian physicist and chemist. He had a special interest in non-reproducible results or what he termed as fluctuating phenomena which were considered outside the area of conventional science according to scientific positivism. He considered the effect of weak electromagnetic fields, sunspot activity, and cosmic radiation as possible influences affecting chemical reactions. These effects were sometimes called as Piccardi effects. His ideas on what he called "activated water" were appropriated by Jacques Benveniste and others to suggest a scientific basis for homeopathy and this has led to his original work being considered as fringe science.

== Life and work ==
Piccardi was born in Florence to Ludovico (d. 1944) and Marianna, née Caldini. He studied from 1913 at the Institute of Higher Studies in Florence (Ateneo Fiorentino Reale Istituto di Studi Superiori Pratici e di Perfezionamento). He studied organic chemistry under Hugo Schiff but his studies were interrupted by World War I; he served in the Alpini. He was interned in Hungary after being taken prisoner in 1917 and escaped by digging a tunnel. He was recaptured and suffered from pleurisy and was transferred back in 1919 from an Austrian prison camp. He received a silver medal for his services but a brother was killed in the war and his mother died in the Spanish flu epidemic of 1918. He returned to studies and graduated in chemistry at the Turin Polytechnic before returning to Florence where he graduated in 1922. He studied under Luigi Rolla. He then worked initially in an honorary position at the University of Florence, and then a salaried position from 1926, assisting Rolla, working there until 1936. He taught mathematics, spectroscopy, chemistry and physical chemistry. He worked on the spectroscopy of rare earths and examination of the solar spectrum. In 1936 he went to the University of Genoa as chair of physical chemistry. He was interested in non-reproducible research results which he thought could be related to magnetic fields or other forces. World War II interrupted his work and he returned to work at Florence University, becoming chair of physical chemistry in 1947. He worked there until his retirement in 1965.

Piccardi was interested in the philosophy of science and interacted with Ludovico Geymonat who was influenced by Moritz Schlick. Piccardi was interested in astrophysics and collaborated with Guglielmo Righini. Piccardi believed that electromagnetic waves could alter the structure of water and conducted experiments on what he called "activated water". He suggested that it altered the reactivity of water to bismuth chloride. He examined the hypothesis that the position of the earth in its orbit might alter certain phenomena affected by solar radiation. His ideas on water were taken up as evidence of a scientific principle to support homeopathy. Piccardi himself was not a proponent of homeopathy. He also worked on a wide range of subjects including a study with a pediatrician to examine the surface tension in human milk. He also examined his non-reproducibility and cosmic effect ideas on seed germination. The validity of his statistical analysis comparing experiments and controls have been questioned.

Piccardi married Nella Forti (1900–1964) from a wealthy Jewish family in 1922. He met her while on a trip in the Dolomite mountains. They had three daughters. Their home in Borgo Pinti was a cultural centre where many famous artists and scholars met. Piccardi was also an amateur artist. The couple separated later and Piccardi lived in Genoa. His brother Giacomo (1901–1975) was the father of Giovanni Piccardi (b. 1929) who became a chemist at the University of Florence. Piccardi died from cancer. In 2002 a "Laboratorio Biometeorologico Giorgio Piccardi" was founded in his honour.
