= Bohemium =

Bohemium was the name assigned to the element with atomic number 93, now known as neptunium, when its discovery was first incorrectly alleged. It was named after Bohemia.

The alleged discovery took place in 1934 and it was published shortly after Enrico Fermi claimed the discovery of element 93, which he called ausonium. Both discoveries were proven wrong after the discovery of nuclear fission in 1938. But even before that time the discovery was reviewed with a negative outcome.

The alleged discovery of the element, now discredited, was made by Odolen Koblic, a Czech engineer.
