= Meson bomb =

Hypothetical nuclear weapon

The meson bomb was a proposed nuclear weapon that would derive its destructive force from meson interactions with fissionable material like uranium. The idea behind the bomb was rejected by most scientists, but during the Cold War, American intelligence managed to trick the Soviet Union into conducting research on this topic, which resulted in several years of wasted labor by one of the Soviet nuclear weapon research bureaus.

== Origins ==
Diagram of a meson, composed of quark and antiquark with spins s_{1} and s_{2} and overall angular momentum L

Mesons (hadronic subatomic particles composed of one quark and one antiquark, bound together by the strong interaction) were proposed to form a nuclear weapon as early as the 1940s. Early speculation suggested that the resulting bomb would be the most powerful nuclear weapon yet to have been developed. American physicist Ernest Lawrence used the potential military applications of mesons to obtain funding for its 184-inch (4,700 mm) synchrocyclotron built between 1940 and 1946 at the University of California, Berkeley. Soon, however, the scientific consensus was that construction of such a bomb would be impossible; and in 1968 physicist M. Stanley Livingston wrote that "no responsible scientists would attempt to justify support in this field with predictions of an 'anti-matter engine,' or a super 'meson bomb,' or a 'hyper-drive' for spaceships."

== Soviet research ==
In the 1960s, however, the Soviet Union became convinced that the United States had already developed the meson bomb, and devoted considerable resources to developing its own. In 1994, Russian physicist and chief constructor of nuclear weapons bureau KB-11 (Design Bureau No. 11, set up in 1946) Arkadiy Brish stated that their work on the meson bomb was prompted by intelligence. Even though physicists Yuliy Borisovich Khariton and Yakov Borisovich Zel'dovich agreed that the reports were nonsensical, the directors of the Soviet atomic bomb project decided to pursue this line of research, which resulted in several years of fruitless labor. Brish attributed this to American disinformation.

== See also ==
- Red mercury – a similar atomic weapon pursued by the Soviets and other groups
