= Gnomium =

Unused name for an undiscovered element

In the late 19th century, the chemical element Gnomium was postulated to exist by Gerhard Krüss and F. W. Schmidt. Krüss and Schmidt proposed the new element, arguing that its existence would solve an apparent problem in the periodic table.

Dmitri Mendeleev and Lothar Meyer were the first to arrange elements in a periodic table ordered by atomic weight, thereby revealing periodic patterns of chemical and physical properties. The use of atomic weight in the ordering — the concept of atomic number not yet having been established — resulted in several problems, one being a discrepancy in the iron group elements.

Ordered by atomic weight, the sequence would be:

iron (55.845) — nickel (58.6934) — cobalt (58.9331)

But arrayed by chemical properties, especially the highest possible oxidation numbers, the sequence would be:

iron (+6) — cobalt (+5) — nickel (+4)

It was initially believed that this problem was due to inadequate measurement of atomic weights, but after several years those of cobalt and nickel were established more precisely and the contradiction remained. In 1892, Krüss and Schmidt proposed to solve it by postulating a new element, very similar to and nearly inseparable from cobalt, but with a higher atomic weight, so that its mixture with cobalt would be heavier than nickel. That proposed element was named gnomium.

However, attempts to isolate gnomium proved fruitless.

It was the introduction of the concept of atomic number, and the re-ordering of the periodic table by atomic number, that resolved this and related problems and obviated the hypotheses for gnomium:

iron (26) — cobalt (27) — nickel (28)
