= Wasium =

Misidentified element

Wasium was the suggested name of a chemical element found by J. F. Bahr. The name was derived from the House of Vasa the Royal House of Sweden.

In 1862 Bahr analysed the mineral Orthite—Allanite-(Y)—from the Norwegian island Rönsholm and found an oxide which he concluded contained a new element. In the following years several articles were published making clear that the wasium oxide was a mixture of several other elements.

Wasium was said by M. Bahr to exist in Norwegian orthite and orthite from Ytterby. Bahr also said that it existed on the island of Raenshohm. Wasium was supposedly found in the mineral wasite, which is a form of allanite.
