= Walter Grotrian =

German astronomer and astrophysicist (1890-1954)

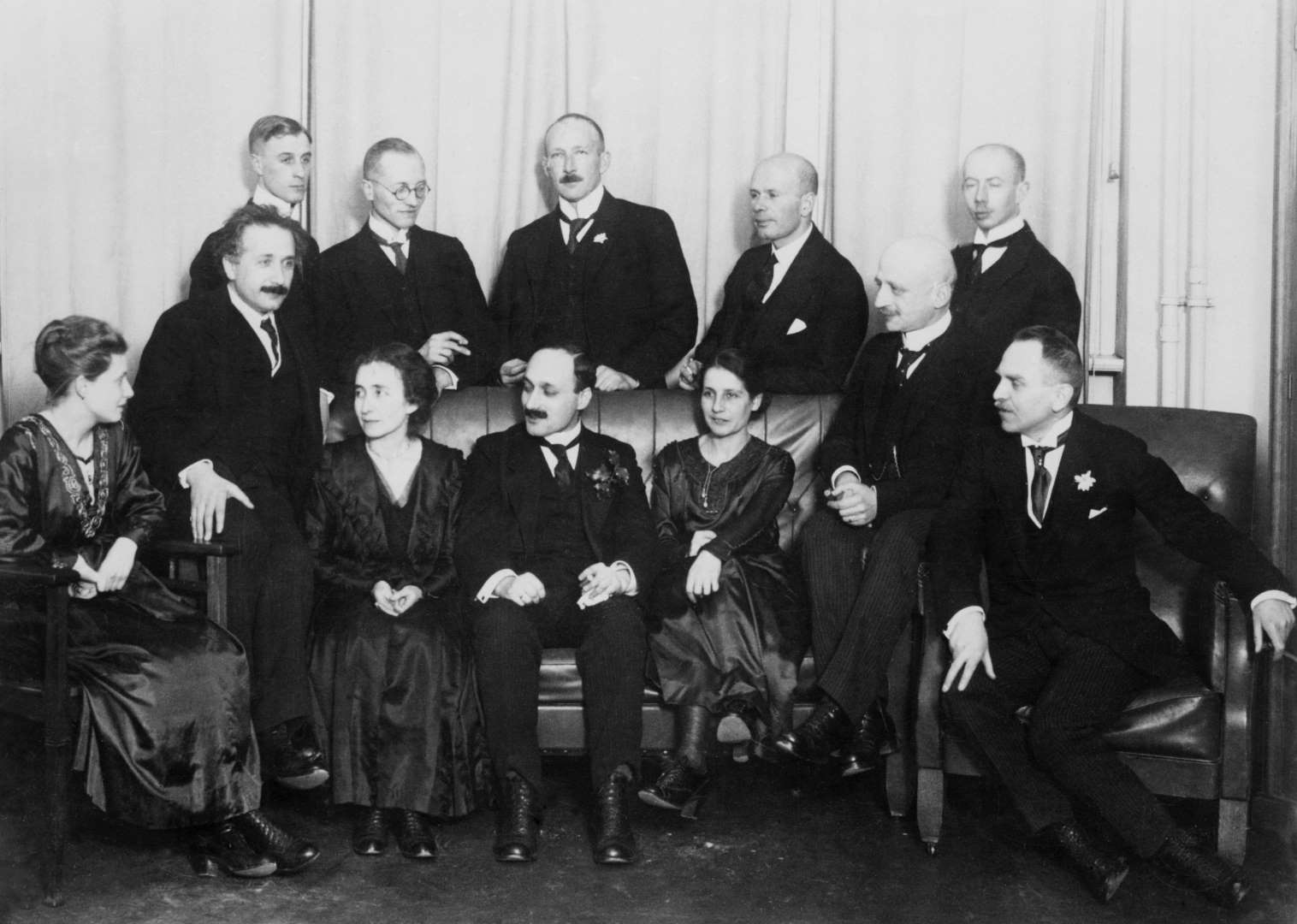
German physicists and chemists in 1920. Standing, left to right: Walter Grotrian, Wilhelm Westphal, Otto von Baeyer, Peter Pringsheim, Gustav Hertz. Sitting, left to right: Hertha Sponer, Albert Einstein, Ingrid and James Franck, Lise Meitner, Fritz Haber, Otto Hahn.

Walter Robert Wilhelm Grotrian (21 April 1890 in Aachen; † 3 March 1954 in Potsdam) was a German astronomer and astrophysicist.

In 1928 he introduced the Grotrian diagram in atomic spectroscopy, showing the allowed transitions between atomic energy levels

Grotrian studied the emission line from the solar corona in the green region of the spectrum; this emission line could not be attributed to any known chemical element and was thought to be a new element (which scientists named "coronium"). Grotrian and Bengt Edlén from Sweden demonstrated that the two observed emission lines arise from iron atoms that have lost about half their 26 electrons.

== Named after Grotrian ==
- The impact crater Grotrian on the Moon
- Character in "Time Keeps on Slippin'" episode of Futurama
