= Red mercury =

Alleged chemical substance

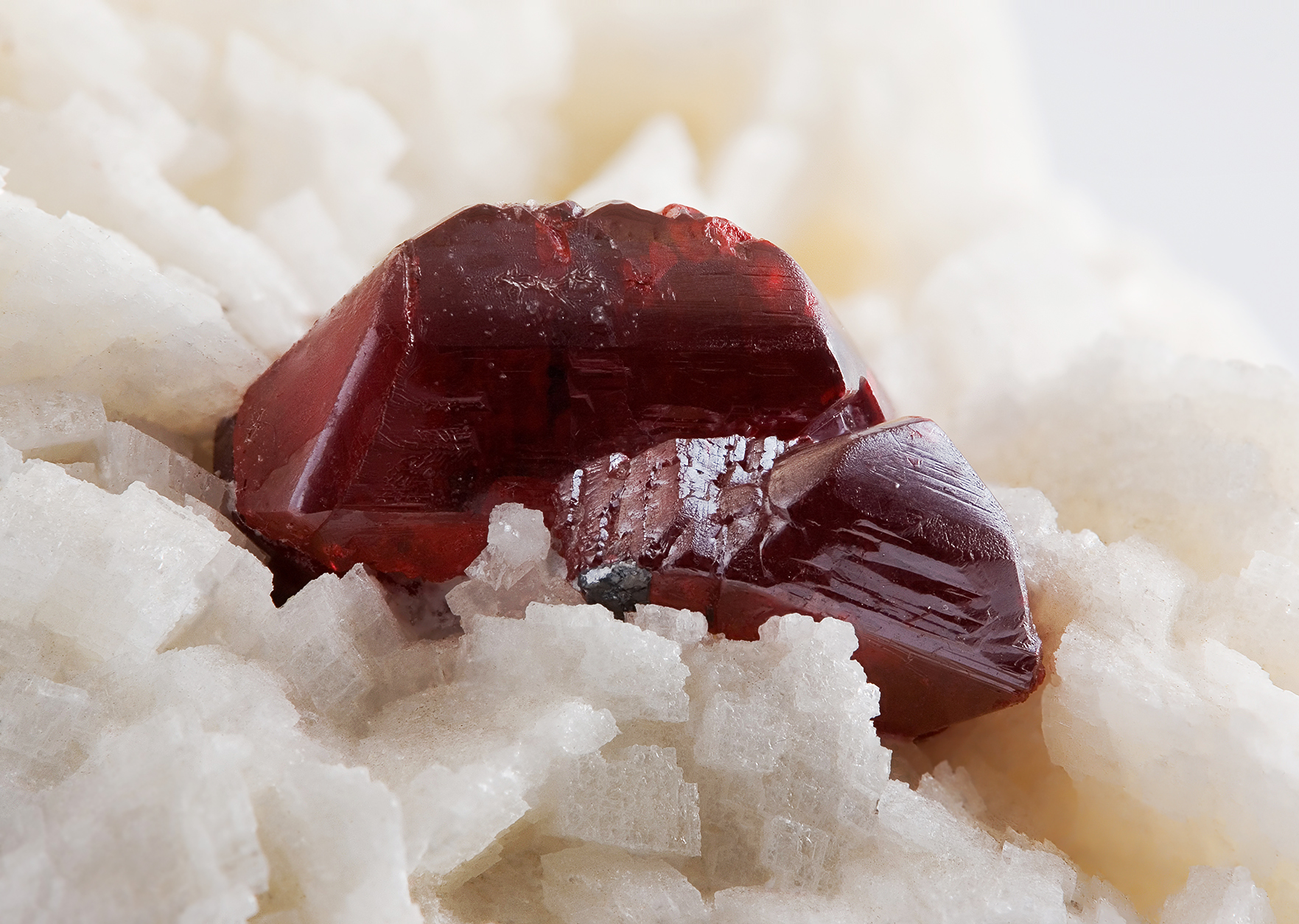
Crystals of mercury(II) sulfide and several other mercury compounds are deeply colored red, but have no publicly known use in nuclear weapons.

Red mercury is a discredited substance, most likely a hoax perpetrated by con artists who sought to take advantage of gullible buyers on the black market for arms. These con artists described it as a substance used in the creation of nuclear weapons; because of the secrecy surrounding nuclear weapons development, it is difficult to disprove their claims completely. However, all samples of alleged "red mercury" analyzed in the public literature have proven to be well-known, common substances of no interest to weapons makers.

== History ==
References to red mercury first appeared in major Soviet and western media sources in the late 1980s. The articles were never specific as to what exactly red mercury was, but nevertheless claimed it was of great importance in nuclear bombs, or that it was used in the building of boosted fission weapons. Almost as soon as the stories appeared, people started attempting to buy it. At that point, the purported nature of the substance started to change, and eventually turned into anything the buyer happened to be interested in. As New Scientist reported in 1992, a Lawrence Livermore National Laboratory report outlined that:

When red mercury first appeared on the international black market 15 years ago, the supposedly top secret nuclear material was 'red' because it came from Russia. When it resurfaced last year in the formerly communist states of Eastern Europe it had unaccountably acquired a red colour. But then, as a report from the US Department of Energy reveals, mysterious transformations are red mercury's stock in trade. The report, compiled by researchers at the Los Alamos National Laboratory, shows that in the hands of hoaxers and conmen, red mercury can do almost anything the aspiring Third World demagogue wants it to. You want a short cut to making an atom bomb? You want the key to Soviet ballistic missile guidance systems? Or perhaps you want the Russian alternative to the anti-radar paint on the stealth bomber? What you need is red mercury.

A 1993 article in the Russian newspaper Pravda, claiming to be informed by leaked top-secret memos, described red mercury as:

[A] super-conductive material used for producing high-precision conventional and nuclear bomb explosives, 'Stealth' surfaces and self-guided warheads. Primary end-users are major aerospace and nuclear-industry companies in the United States and France along with nations aspiring to join the nuclear club, such as South Africa, Israel, Iran, Iraq, and Libya.

Two TV documentaries about red mercury were made by British Channel 4 television, airing in 1993 and 1994; Trail of Red Mercury and Pocket Neutron, which claimed to have "startling evidence that Russian scientists have designed a miniature neutron bomb using a mysterious compound called red mercury".

Samuel T. Cohen, an American physicist who worked on building the atomic bomb, said in his autobiography that red mercury is manufactured by "mixing special nuclear materials in very small amounts into the ordinary compound and then inserting the mixture into a nuclear reactor or bombarding it with a particle-accelerator beam." When detonated, this mixture allegedly becomes "extremely hot, which allows pressures and temperatures to be built up that are capable of igniting the heavy hydrogen and producing a pure-fusion mini neutron bomb."

Red mercury was offered for sale throughout Europe and the Middle East by Russian businessmen, who found many buyers who would pay almost anything for the substance, even though they had no idea what it was. A study for the Bulletin of the Atomic Scientists published in 1997 has perhaps the most factual summary of red mercury:

The asking price for red mercury ranged from $100,000 to $300,000 per kilogram. Sometimes the material would be irradiated or shipped in containers with radioactive symbols, perhaps to convince potential buyers of its strategic value. But samples seized by police contained only mercury(II) oxide, mercury(II) iodide, or mercury mixed with red dye – hardly materials of interest to weapons-makers.

Following the arrest of several men in Britain in September 2004, on suspicion that they were trying to buy a kilogram of red mercury for £900,000, the International Atomic Energy Agency made a statement dismissing claims that the substance is real. "Red mercury doesn't exist," said the spokesman. "The whole thing is a bunch of malarkey." When the case came to trial at the Old Bailey in April 2006, it became apparent that News of the World's "fake sheikh" Mazher Mahmood had worked with the police to catch the three men (Dominic Martins, Roque Fernandes and Abdurahman Kanyare). They were tried for "trying to set up funding or property for terrorism" and "having an article (a highly dangerous mercury-based substance) for terrorism". According to the prosecutor, red mercury was believed to be a material which could cause a large explosion, possibly even a nuclear reaction, and whether or not red mercury actually existed was irrelevant to the prosecution. All three men were acquitted in July 2006.

== Analysis ==
Several common mercury compounds are indeed red, such as mercury sulfide (from which the bright-red pigment vermilion was originally derived), mercury(II) oxide (historically called red precipitate), and mercury(II) iodide. No use for any of these compounds in nuclear weapons has been publicly documented. "Red mercury" could also be a code name for a substance that contains no mercury at all.

A variety of different items have been chemically analyzed as putative samples of "red mercury" since the substance first came to the attention of the media, but no single substance was found in these items. A sample of radioactive material was seized by German police in May 1994. This consisted of a complex mixture of elements, including about 10% by weight plutonium, with the remainder consisting of 61% mercury, 11% antimony, 6% oxygen, 2% iodine and 1.6% gallium. The reason why somebody had assembled this complex mixture of chemicals is unknown; equally puzzling was the presence of fragments of glass and brush bristles, suggesting that someone had dropped a bottle of this substance and then swept it up into a new container.

In contrast, an analysis reported in 1998 of a different "red mercury" sample concluded that this sample was a non-radioactive mixture of elemental mercury, water and mercury(II) iodide, which is a red colored chemical. Similarly, another analysis of a sample recovered in Zagreb in November 2003 reported that this item contained only mercury. One formula that had been claimed previously for red mercury was Hg_{2}Sb_{2}O_{7} (mercury(II) pyroantimonate), but no antimony was detected in this 2003 sample.

== Explanations ==
Red mercury was described by many commentators, and the exact nature of its supposed working mechanism varied widely among them. In general, however, none of these explanations appear to be scientifically or historically supportable.

=== Background ===
Traditional staged thermonuclear weapons consist of two parts, a fission "primary" and a fusion/fission "secondary". The energy released by the primary when it explodes is used to (indirectly) compress the secondary and start a fusion reaction within it. Conventional explosives are far too weak to provide the level of compression needed.

The primary is generally built as small as possible, because the energy released by the secondary is much larger, and thus building a larger primary is generally inefficient. There is a lower limit on the size of the primary, known as the critical mass. For weapons grade plutonium, this is around 10 kilograms (22 lb). This can be reduced through the use of neutron reflectors or clever arrangements of explosives to compress the core, but these methods generally add to the size and complexity of the resulting device.

Because of the need for a fission primary and the difficulty of purifying weapons-grade fissile materials, the majority of arms control efforts to limit nuclear proliferation rely on the detection and control of the fissile material and the equipment needed to obtain it.

=== Shortcut to fissionable material ===
A theory popular in the mid-1990s was that red mercury facilitated the enrichment of uranium to weapons-grade purity. Conventionally, such enrichment is usually done with Zippe-type centrifuges, and takes several years. Red mercury was speculated to eliminate this costly and time-consuming step. Although this would not eliminate the possibility of detecting the material, it could escape detection during enrichment as the facilities hosting centrifuges normally used in this process are large and require equipment that can be fairly easily tracked internationally. Eliminating such equipment would in theory greatly ease the construction of a clandestine nuclear weapon.

=== Shortcut to fusible material ===
A key part of the secondary in a fusion bomb is lithium-6-deuteride. When irradiated with high-energy neutrons, Li-6 creates tritium, which mixes with the deuterium in the same mixture and fuses at a relatively low temperature. Russian weapon designers have reported (1993) that red mercury was the Soviet codename for lithium-6, which has an affinity for mercury and tends to acquire a red colour due to mercuric impurities during its separation process.

=== Red mercury as a ballotechnic ===
Samuel T. Cohen, the "father of the neutron bomb", claimed for a long time that red mercury is a powerful explosive-like chemical known as a ballotechnic. The energy released during its reaction is allegedly enough to directly compress the secondary without the need for a fission primary in a thermonuclear weapon. He claimed that he learned that the Soviet scientists perfected the use of red mercury and used it to produce a number of softball-sized pure fusion bombs weighing as little as 10 lb (4.5 kg), which he claimed were made in large numbers.

He went on to claim that the reason this is not more widely known is that elements within the US power structure are deliberately suppressing or hiding information due to the frightening implications such a weapon would have on nuclear proliferation. Since a red mercury bomb would require no fissile material, it would seemingly be impossible to protect against its widespread proliferation given current arms control methodologies. Instead of trying to do so, they simply claim it does not exist, while acknowledging its existence privately. Cohen also claimed that when President Boris Yeltsin took power, he secretly authorized the sale of red mercury on the international market, and that fake versions of it were sometimes offered to gullible buyers.

Critics argue Cohen's claims are difficult to support scientifically. The amount of energy released by the fission primary is thousands of times greater than that released by conventional explosives, and it appears that the "red mercury" approach would be orders of magnitude smaller than required.

Additionally, it appears there is no independent confirmation of any sort of Cohen's claims to the reality of red mercury. The scientists in charge of the labs where the material would have been made have publicly dismissed the claims (see below), as have multiple US colleagues, including Edward Teller.

According to Cohen, veteran nuclear weapon designer Frank Barnaby conducted secret interviews with Russian scientists who told him that red mercury was produced by dissolving mercury antimony oxide in mercury, heating and irradiating the resultant amalgam, and then removing the elemental mercury through evaporation. The irradiation was reportedly carried out by placing the substance inside a nuclear reactor.

=== Stealth paint ===
As mentioned earlier, one of the origins of the term "red mercury" was in the Russian newspaper Pravda, which claimed that red mercury was "a super-conductive material used for producing high-precision conventional and nuclear bomb explosives, 'stealth' surfaces and self-guided warheads." Any substance with these sorts of highly differing properties would be suspect to most, but the stealth story continued to have some traction long after most had dismissed the entire story.

=== Nuclear "sting" operations ===
Red mercury is thought by some to be the invention of an intelligence agency or criminal gang for the purpose of deceiving terrorists and rogue states who were trying to acquire nuclear technology on the black market. One televised report indicated that the Soviet Union encouraged the KGB and GRU to arrange sting operations for the detection of those seeking to deal in nuclear materials. The Soviet intelligence services allegedly created a myth of the necessity of "red mercury" for the sorts of nuclear devices that terrorists and rogue governments might seek. Political entities that already had nuclear weapons did nothing to debunk the myth.

In 1999 Jane's Intelligence Review suggested that victims of red mercury scams may have included Osama bin Laden.

=== Red mercury in southern Africa ===
Organizations involved in landmine clearance and unexploded munitions disposal noted a belief amongst some communities in southern Africa that red mercury may be found in certain types of ordnance. Attempting to extract red mercury, purported to be highly valuable, was reported as a motivation for people dismantling items of unexploded ordnance, and suffering death or injury as a result. In some cases it was reported that unscrupulous traders may be deliberately promoting this misconception in an effort to build a market for recovered ordnance.

An explosion in Chitungwiza, Zimbabwe, that killed five people is attributed to a quest to reclaim red mercury from a live landmine.

=== Saudi Arabia ===
In April 2009 it was reported from Saudi Arabia that rumors that Singer sewing machines contained "red mercury" had caused the prices of such machines to massively increase in the Kingdom, with some paying up to SR200,000 for a single machine which could previously have been bought for SR200. Believers in the rumor claimed that the presence of red mercury in the sewing machines' needles could be detected using a mobile telephone; if the line cut off when the telephone was placed near to the needle, this supposedly proved that the substance was present.

In Medina there was a busy trade in the sewing machines, with buyers seen using mobile phones to check the machines for red mercury content, while it was reported that others had resorted to theft, with two tailors' shops in Dhulum broken into and their sewing machines stolen. At other locales, there were rumors that a Kuwait-based multinational had been buying up the Singer machines, while in Al-Jouf, the residents were led to believe that a local museum was buying up any such machines that it could find, and a number of women appeared at the museum offering to sell their Singer machines.

There was little agreement among believers in the story as to the exact nature or even color of the red mercury, while the supposed uses for it ranged from it being an essential component of nuclear power, to having the ability to summon jinn, extract gold, or locate buried treasure and perform other forms of magic. These beliefs in the supernatural properties of red mercury are rooted in medieval Islamic conceptions of the alchemical properties of mercury. The official spokesman for the Riyadh police said that the rumors had been started by gangs attempting to swindle people out of their money, and denied the existence of red mercury in sewing machines.

=== Egypt ===
Some local folklore and popular beliefs hold that red mercury or similar mystical substances were associated with Pharaohs and their mummies, thought to possess protective or supernatural powers. These beliefs suggest that such substances could influence outcomes, guard treasures, or provide mystical advantages, though they are entirely legendary and have no scientific basis.

=== Syria ===
In July 2025 some Syrian media reported story about "criminal groups" offering red mercury and other radioactive elements for sale, which they allegedly obtained through bribery from "corrupt officials of ministry of defense of Ukraine".

== Fictional references ==
- In the 1995 PlayStation game Warhawk, red mercury is used by the mad warlord Kreel in his bid for world domination.
- In the BBC spy thriller series Spooks, red mercury is portrayed in the second episode of season 3 (released in 2004) as a nonexistent substance used to trap a terrorist group planning to make a nuclear bomb. The terrorist group offers to pay 5 million US dollars for 5 grammes of the substance.
- Red Mercury is a 2005 thriller film in which terrorists plan to use the chemical in a bombing attack.
- In the 2006 video game Tom Clancy's Splinter Cell: Double Agent, red mercury is used by the terrorist group JBA, to create multiple nuclear devices intended to bomb three major American cities.
- The 2013 Bruce Willis movie Red 2 features a nuclear weapon containing red mercury as the main explosive component.
- The 2019 Bengali adventure film Sagardwipey Jawker Dhan involves the protagonists hunting for red mercury to save an alien child.

== See also ==
- Dimethylmercury
- Fogbank
- Mercury(II) oxide
- Meson bomb
- Nuclear isomer
- Philosopher's stone
