= Lucium =

Proposed element name

Lucium was the proposed name for an alleged new element found by chemist Prosper Barrière in 1896 in the mineral monazite. Later, William Crookes confirmed that the new element was actually an impure sample of yttrium.
