= Ausenium and hesperium =

Misidentified chemical elements

Ausenium (or ausonium, atomic symbol Ao) and hesperium (atomic symbol Hs) were the names initially assigned to the transuranic elements with atomic numbers 93 and 94, respectively, after Enrico Fermi and his team at the University of Rome wrongly thought they discovered them in 1934.

Following the discovery of nuclear fission in 1938, it was realized that "elements" found by Fermi were actually a mixture of barium, krypton, and other elements. The actual elements were discovered several years later, and assigned the names neptunium and plutonium. Already in 1934, Ida Noddack had presented alternative explanations for Fermi's experimental results.

Element 93, ausenium, was named after a Greek name of Italy, Ausonia. Element 94, hesperium, was named in Italian Esperio after Hesperia, a poetic name of Italy.

== See also ==
- History of nuclear fission
- List of misidentified chemical elements
