= Coronium =

Hypothesised chemical element

A solar eclipse, with the solar corona visible.

Coronium was the name of a suggested chemical element that was hypothesised in the 19th century. The name, inspired by the solar corona, was given by Anton Gruenwald in 1887. A new atomic thin green line in the solar corona was then considered to be emitted by a new element unlike anything else seen under laboratory conditions. It was later determined to be emitted by iron (Fe^{13+}), so highly ionized that it was at that time impossible to produce in a laboratory.

== Solar spectroscopy ==
During the total solar eclipse of 7 August 1869, a green emission line of wavelength 530.3 nm was independently observed by Charles Augustus Young (1834–1908) and William Harkness (1837–1903) in the coronal spectrum. Since this line did not correspond to that of any known material, it was proposed that it was due to an unknown element, provisionally named coronium.

The supposed element was allegedly discovered also in the gases given off by Mount Vesuvius in 1898 by a team of Italian chemists led by Raffaello Nasini. Nasini had no photographic record of the spectrum, and the observation was considered unconfirmed.

In 1902, over thirty years after his famous predictions of new elements based on his periodic table, and shortly after the discovery of various noble gases, the Russian chemist Dmitri Mendeleev hypothesized that there existed two noble gases of atomic weight less than hydrogen. The first, which he called "element x" or "newtonium", was his attempt at a chemical explanation of the luminiferous aether. He argued that it had an atomic weight of 0.14. The second, which he called "element y" or coronium, was his attempt to explain the green emission lines from the Sun. He argued that it had an atomic weight of 0.4.

It was not until the 1930s that Walter Grotrian and Bengt Edlén discovered that the spectral line at 530.3 nm was due to highly ionized iron (Fe^{13+}); other unusual lines in the coronal spectrum were also caused by highly charged ions, such as nickel, the high ionization being due to the extreme temperature of the solar corona. The line at 530.3 nm had previously been misclassified as iron line number 1474.

== See also ==
- Helium
- Nebulium
- Spectroscopy
