= Emil Osann =

German physiologist

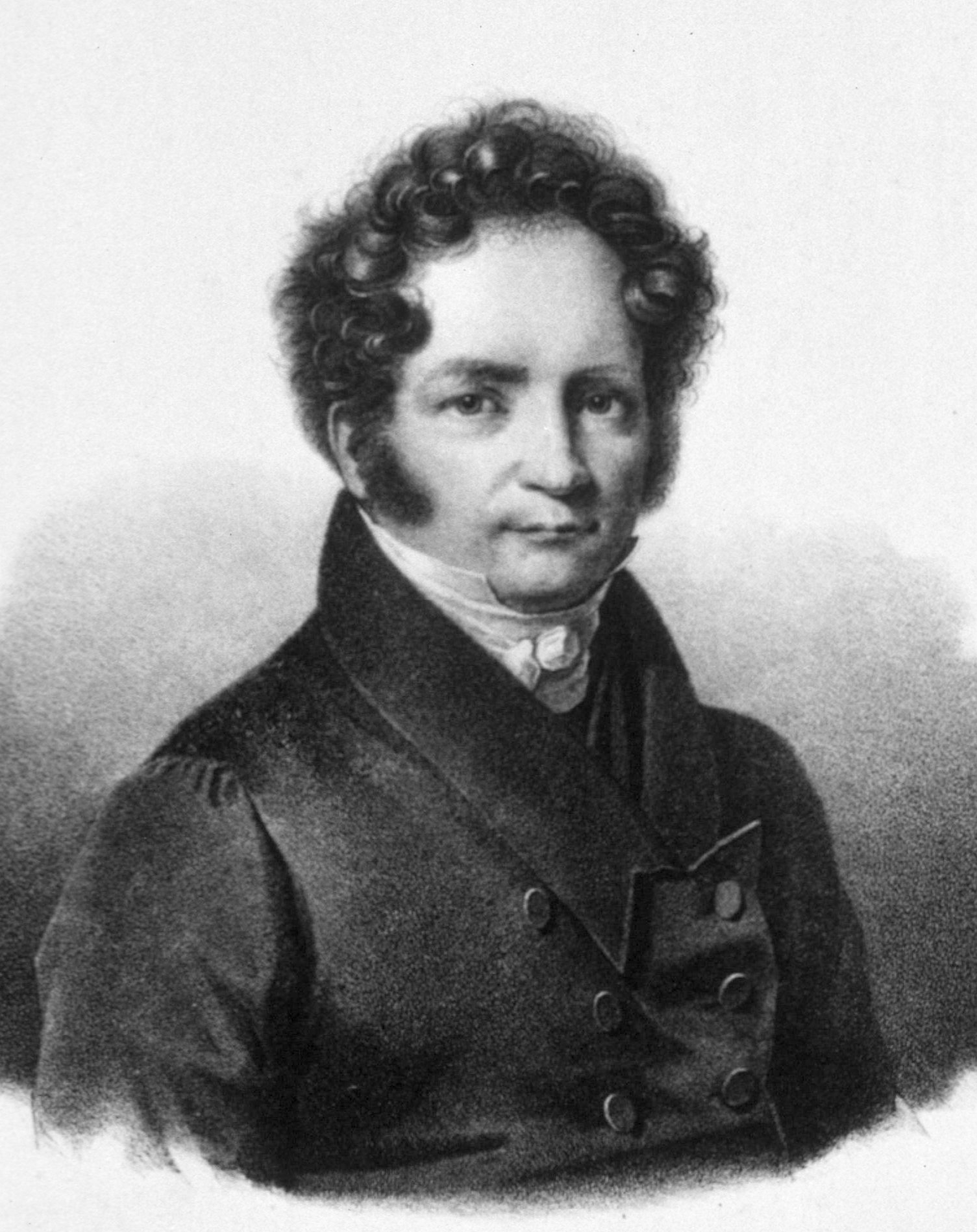
Emil Osann

Emil Osann (May 25, 1787 – January 11, 1842) was a German medical doctor and physiologist from Weimar. He was a founder of scientific balneology.

He was the brother of philologist Friedrich Gotthilf Osann (1794-1858) and chemist Gottfried Osann (1796-1866).

He studied medicine in Jena and Göttingen, and later worked an assistant in a Berlin polyclinic founded by his uncle, Christoph Wilhelm Hufeland (1762–1836). In 1826 he became a full professor of Heilmittellehre (medical instruction), and in 1833 became director of the aforementioned clinic.

Osann is remembered for his work on the effects of mineral springs from a physical and medical standpoint. Among his writings was a two-volume work on European mineral spas, titled Physikalisch-medicinische Darstellung der bekannten Heilquellen der vorzüglichsten Länder Europas. It is considered to be the first comprehensive publication in the field of balneology.

In 1837 Osann became sole editor of the Journal der praktischen Heilkunde (Journal of Practical Medicine).

== Bibliography ==
- Ideen zur Bearbeitung einer Geschichte der Physiologie : Vorwort und Einladung zu meinen öffentlichen Vorlesungen über Physiologie des menschlichen Organismus; Berlin : Dümmler, 1815 - Ideas for editing a history of physiology, etc.
- Die Mineralquellen zu Kaiser-Franzensbad bei Eger, Historisch-medicinisch dargestellt von E. Osann und physikalisch-chemisch untersucht von B. Trommsdorff; Berlin : Dümmler, 1822 - The mineral springs of Kaiser Franzensbad near Eger.
- Physikalisch-medicinische Darstellung der bekannten Heilquellen der vorzüglichsten Länder Europa's; Berlin : F. Dümmler, 1829-1832 (second enlarged edition, Berlin: F. Dümmler, 1839-1841) - Physico-medicinal representation of the famous mineral springs of the principal countries of Europe.
