= Andreas von Antropoff =

German chemist (1878–1956)

- Born: 16 August 1878; Reval, Russian Empire (present-day Estonia)
- Died: 2 June 1956 (aged 77); Bonn, Germany
- Education: Riga Polytechnic School; Heidelberg University; Saint Petersburg State University
- Spouse: Erika Germann (m. 1926}

Andreas von Antropoff (Russian: Андрей Романович Антропов; 16 August 1878, Reval, Russian Empire — 2 June 1956, Bonn) was a Russian (Estonian-born) and German scientist-chemist, professor at the Bonn University and is known to have coined the term "neutronium" and developed a temporarily and widely used alternative periodic table of elements in 1926.

== Biography ==
His father was Roman von Antropoff, a lawyer and owner of a manor house and his mother was Sophie Emilie von Antropoff. Antropoff had four brothers and one sister:

- Roman Andreas von Antropoff
- Elisabeth Molly von Antropoff
- Sergei von Antropoff
- Nikolai Alexander von Antropoff
- Karl Alexander von Antropoff

From 1889 to 1892 Andreas von Antropoff attended the Domschule of the St Mary's Cathedral, Tallinn, in 1893 the Lajusschule and later the secondary school in Reval. He studied mechanical engineering at the Polytechnic School in Riga from 1897 to 1899 and chemistry from 1899 to 1904.

From 1904 to 1907 he studied chemistry in Heidelberg, where he graduated as a Doctor of Science (Dr. phil. nat.). In 1907 and 1908 he worked as a researcher at the University College London under William Ramsay.

From 1908 to 1915 he was assistant and associate professor and from 1911 to 1915 lecturer for inorganic chemistry at the Riga Polytechnic School. In 1911 he made his Magister degree at the Saint Petersburg State University and was department head at the Central Chamber for Measures and Weights in Saint Petersburg.

In 1916 he was arrested on allegations of espionage in connection with World War I and imprisoned from July 1916 until March 1917 in Saint Petersburg. From September 1917 until January 1918, he served in the military. In 1918 he was again arrested for political reasons by Bolsheviks of the Petrograd Soviet.

In 1918 Antropoff was appointed to the Technical College in Karlsruhe, from where he went to serve in Bonn as a full professor and department head for physical chemistry from 1924.

Andreas von Antropoff married Erika Pauline Alice von Antropoff (born Erika Germann in Spremberg) on 11 December 1926.

Antropoff became dean of the faculty of mathematics and natural sciences in Bonn University and a member of the Senate. An active national socialist, he was the first to hoist the swastika flag at the university in 1933. In 1944 he took over the management of the Agricultural Research Institute in Ebstorf, Uelzen county. As a result of his Nazi past, he was suspended from office in 1945 and retired in 1948.

== Antropoff's periodic table ==
He first published his periodic table in the article "Eine neue Form des periodischen Systems der Elemente" in the Zeitschrift für angewandte Chemie in 1926.

The periodic table is regularly numbered from 1 - Hydrogen to 118 - Oganesson, with "each number representing the number of protons stored within an atom's nucleus in a satisfying balance" compared to most other contemporary tables. In addition, he placed the theoretical "Element zero" atop his periodic table and called it Neutronium.

His periodic table was in widespread use in German schools until 1945 and soon disappeared after von Antropoff's Nazi affiliations came to light.

Linus Pauling copied Antropoff's periodic table design in his 1949 book General Chemistry and used it also in other editions of The Chemical Bond without crediting Antropoff, most likely due to the author's disgrace.

== Publications ==
Antropoff authored several publications on inorganic chemistry, general chemistry, electrochemistry, and physics, such as:

- Experimentelle Untersuchung über die Löslichkeit der Edelgase in Flüssigkeiten, 1919
- Experimentelle Einführung in die Chemie, (1929)
- Atlas der anorganischen und physikalischen Chemie (in cooperation with M. v. Stackelberg)
- Wandtafeln des periodischen Systems der Elemente, 1926
