= Friedrich Gotthilf Osann =

German classical philologist

- Born: August 22, 1794
- Died: November 30, 1858 (aged 64)

Academic work
- Discipline: Philogy
- Institutions: University of Jena; University of Giessen

Friedrich Gotthilf Osann (August 22, 1794, in Weimar – 30 November 1858, in Giessen) was a German classical philologist. He was a brother to physician Emil Osann (1787–1842) and chemist Gottfried Osann (1796–1866). He received his education at the Universities of Jena and Berlin, where he was a student of August Boeckh. In 1816 he obtained his PhD, and during the following year undertook an educational journey through Germany, France, Italy and England. In 1821 he was appointed an associate professor of philology at Jena, followed by a full professorship at the University of Giessen in 1825.

== Literary work ==
Osann was the author of a major work on Greek and Roman literary history, titled Beiträge zur griechischen und römischen Litteraturgeschichte (two volumes 1834 & 1839). Other principal written efforts include:

- Sylloge Inscriptionum antiquarum Graecarum et Latinarum 1834.
- Disputatio de tabula Patronatus Latina cum epimetro de litterarum B et V permutatione, 1839.
- F. Osann commentatio de gemma scalpta christiana, 1843.
- Quaestionum Homericarum Particula, 1851.
- Prolegomena ad Eustathii Macrembolitae de amoribus Hysminiae et Hysmines drama ab se edenbum, 1855.
- Pindari Pyth. III. Enarratio. 1858.
