= Gerhard Krüss =

German chemist (1859–1895)

- Born: 14 December 1859; Free and Hanseatic City of Hamburg
- Died: 3 February 1895 (aged 35); Munich, Germany
- Education: Ludwig-Maximilians-Universität München
- Scientific career
- Workplaces: Heidelberg University
- Doctoral advisor: Robert Bunsen

Gerhard Krüss (14 December 1859 – 3 February 1895) was a German chemist and founder of the Journal für anorganische Chemie (Journal of Inorganic Chemistry) in 1892. The journal is still published under the name of ZAAC - Zeitschrift für anorganische und allgemeine (Journal of Inorganic and General Chemistry). Krüss was involved in several topics during his university career at the Ludwig-Maximilians-Universität München. He focused on analytical and inorganic chemistry and in his early years the chemistry of gold compounds and the measurement of atomic masses were his main interests. Later he became involved in the research of the rare earth elements. Krüss also suggested a new element similar to cobalt solving a problem in the sequence of iron, cobalt and nickel in the periodic table; he named it gnomium.
