= Neutronium =

Hypothetical substance in nuclear physics

Neutronium (or element zero) is a hypothetical element built solely from neutrons. The word was coined by scientist Andreas von Antropoff in 1926 for the hypothetical "element of atomic number zero" (with no protons in its nucleus) that he placed at the head of the periodic table (denoted by -).

== History ==
Ernest Rutherford proposed a hypothetical neutral particle in 1920, as a combination of a proton and an electron with the atomic nucleus. The proposed particle would later be discovered by James Chadwick in 1932, but the composition of this particle would ultimately be found not to correspond to the sum of a proton and an electron. In the intervening years the particle came to be called a neutron, a term invented by Andreas von Antropoff in a 1926 paper which also introduced the term neutronium. The work by von Antropoff was on a new proposed form of the periodic table and included a conjectured element made up of neutrons with no protons or electrons, which he placed as the chemical element of atomic number zero at the head of his new version of the periodic table. This neutronium was subsequently placed in the middle of several spiral representations of the periodic system for classifying the chemical elements, such as those of Charles Janet (1928), Edgar Emerson (1944), and John D. Clark (1950). All of these authors believed neutronium would be a noble gas.

== Chemistry ==
Neutronium is considered by some chemists to be a legitimate element with atoms that are single neutrons, an element with no chemical properties whatsoever. Other chemists reject that point of view.

== Polynuclear particles ==
Some modern work considers the combination of multiple neutrons. The dineutron, containing two neutrons, is not a stable bound particle, but an extremely short-lived resonance state produced by nuclear reactions in the decay of beryllium-16. Evidence reported in 2012 for the resonance was disputed, but new work reportedly clears up the issues. A trineutron state consisting of three neutrons has not been detected, and is not expected to be bound. A tetraneutron is a hypothetical particle consisting of four bound neutrons. Reports of its existence have not been replicated. Calculations indicate that the hypothetical pentaneutron state, consisting of a cluster of five neutrons, would not be bound.

== Astrophysics ==
Neutronium is also the name of any substance composed solely of neutrons. The cores of neutron stars consist largely of neutrons and might be considered an example of neutronium. However, neutron stars have a complex layered structure, starting with neutron-rich nuclei like ^{56}Fe and progressing through a neutron fluid to a series of phases referred to as nuclear pasta.

== See also ==
- Neutron degenerate matter
