= Luigi Rolla =

Italian chemist (1882–1960)

Luigi Vittorio Maria Rolla (21 May 1882 – 8 November 1960) was an Italian physical chemist. He worked in several universities before becoming a professor at the University of Florence. He worked on physical chemistry but became most well known after he made a claim to the discovery of the element with atomic number 61 which he thought to be stable, claimed to have extracted a pure sample, and gave the name Florentium. This was later found to be incorrect and the event known as the "Florentium fiasco" overshadowed his other works, including several military inventions.

== Life and work ==
Rolla was born in Genoa to accountant Giovanni and Giuditta Boggiano. He went to school in Genoa and graduated in chemistry in 1905 and worked at the Ligurian University under Guido Pellizzari on organic compounds. He also worked on physics problems with Antonio Garbasso, which made him more interested in physical chemistry. He worked after his doctorate in Berlin under Walther Nernst from 1908 to 1909 and returned to the University of Genoa where he began to focus on thermodynamics in chemistry. He began to teach from 1910 and during World War I, he served as an artillery officer and was involved in a photo-telemetery service for the army. After the war he returned to the University of Genoa and worked with Luigi Belladen. In 1920 he became an extraordinary professor at the University of Sassari where he worked for a year before moving to Florence. Here he found the earlier lab of Hugo Schiff to be outdated and established a chemical laboratory with donations from private individuals (including himself and his brother Ferdinand Rolla) and the state. Aside from chemistry he continued the work he had begun in wartime on telegraphy with Luigi Mazza (1898–1978). The chemical institute received a large donation from Genoan industrialist Felice Bensa. They received two tons of monazite sand from Brazil to study rare earths. He worked with Giovanni Canneri (1897–1964) and became interested in the rare earth elements Lanthanum and Lutetium. Based on X-ray spectra studies he suggested that there should be an element between their atomic numbers 57 and 72 at atomic number 61. The hunt for the element was made in Brazilian monazite sand with fractional crystallization. He was able to extract a small sample and along with his assistant Lorenzo Fernandez claimed that they had discovered a new element which was called as Florentium with atomic number 61. They handed a sealed envelope of their claims in 1924 to the Accademia dei Lincei. A long dispute followed and another group from the University of Illinois claimed that they had identified the element which they named as Illinum. Another group at the Ohio State University reported producing element 61 by bombardment in a cyclotron and called it Cyclonium. They also noted that the element was not stable and could not exist in nature which made Rolla's sample claim untenable despite the Accademia dei Lincei's support at a time when Italian nationalists were vocal. He fell out with Lorenzo Fernandez who left the university. In 1935 he moved back to the University of Genoa. It was in 1945 after studies of several radioisotopes, that element 61 was more carefully characterized and given the name Promethium. Rolla aligned with the fascists during World War II. Rolla nominated George de Hevesy for the Nobel Prize in 1943. During 1944, Rolla's brother Carlo, a surgeon, was killed in allied bombing. Another brother died in 1948.. He was made a professor emeritus after his retirement in 1957. His students included Giorgio Piccardi. A celebration was held on his 75th birthday and a gold medal was made with Saint John the Baptist (patron saint for Genoa and Florence) on one side and a laurel wreath on the other with "To Luigi Rolla, master of science, of life, on his 75th birthday" by his students. He lived in a mansion on via Pastrengo and died after a brief illness.
