= Bengt Edlén =

Swedish astronomer (1906–1993)

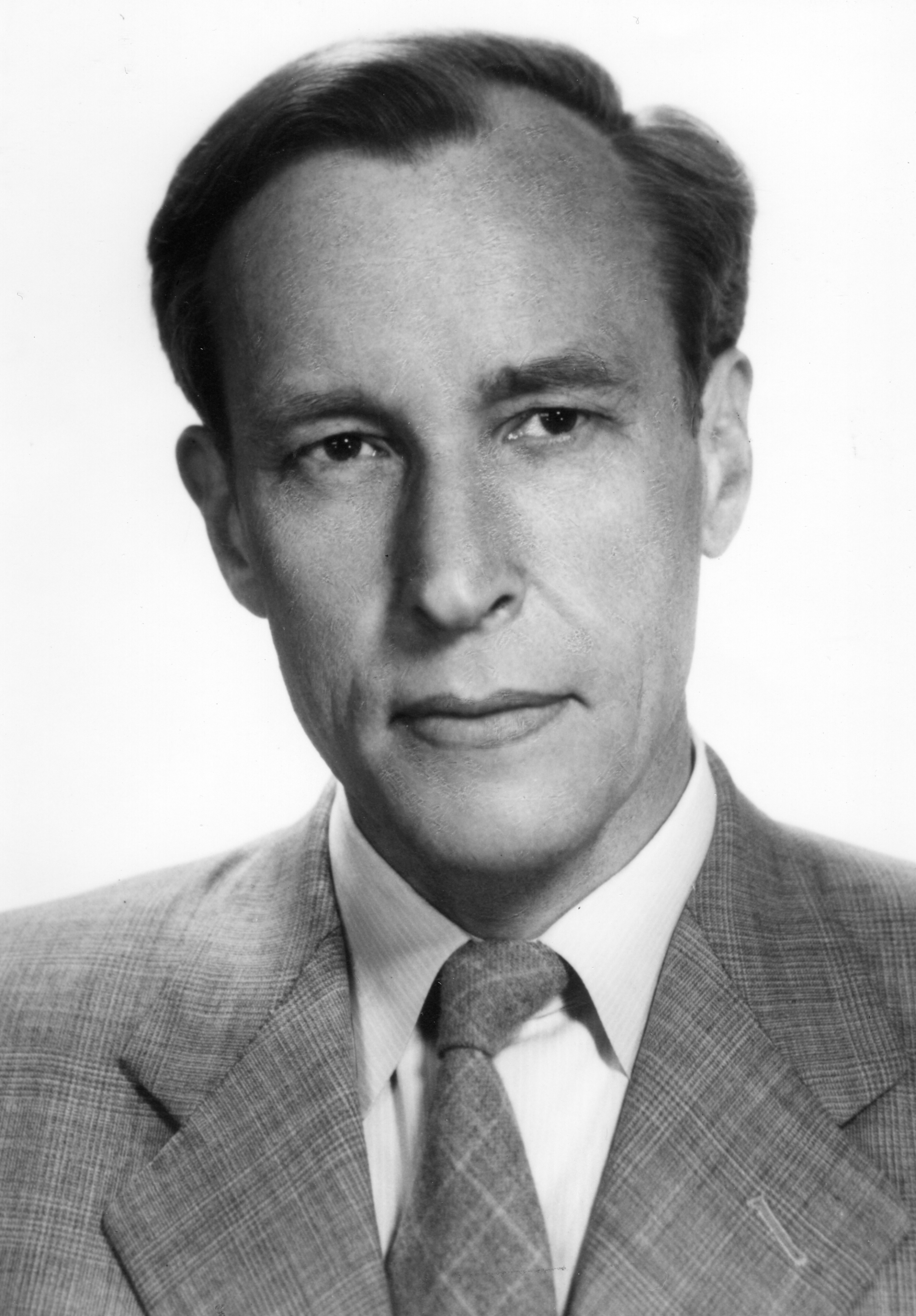
Bengt Edlen

Bengt Edlén (2 November 1906, Gusum – 10 February 1993, Lund) was a Swedish astronomer who specialized in spectroscopy. He was the first to identify the source of unknown spectral lines in the solar corona, which allowed for early calculations of the corona's temperature.

== Biography ==
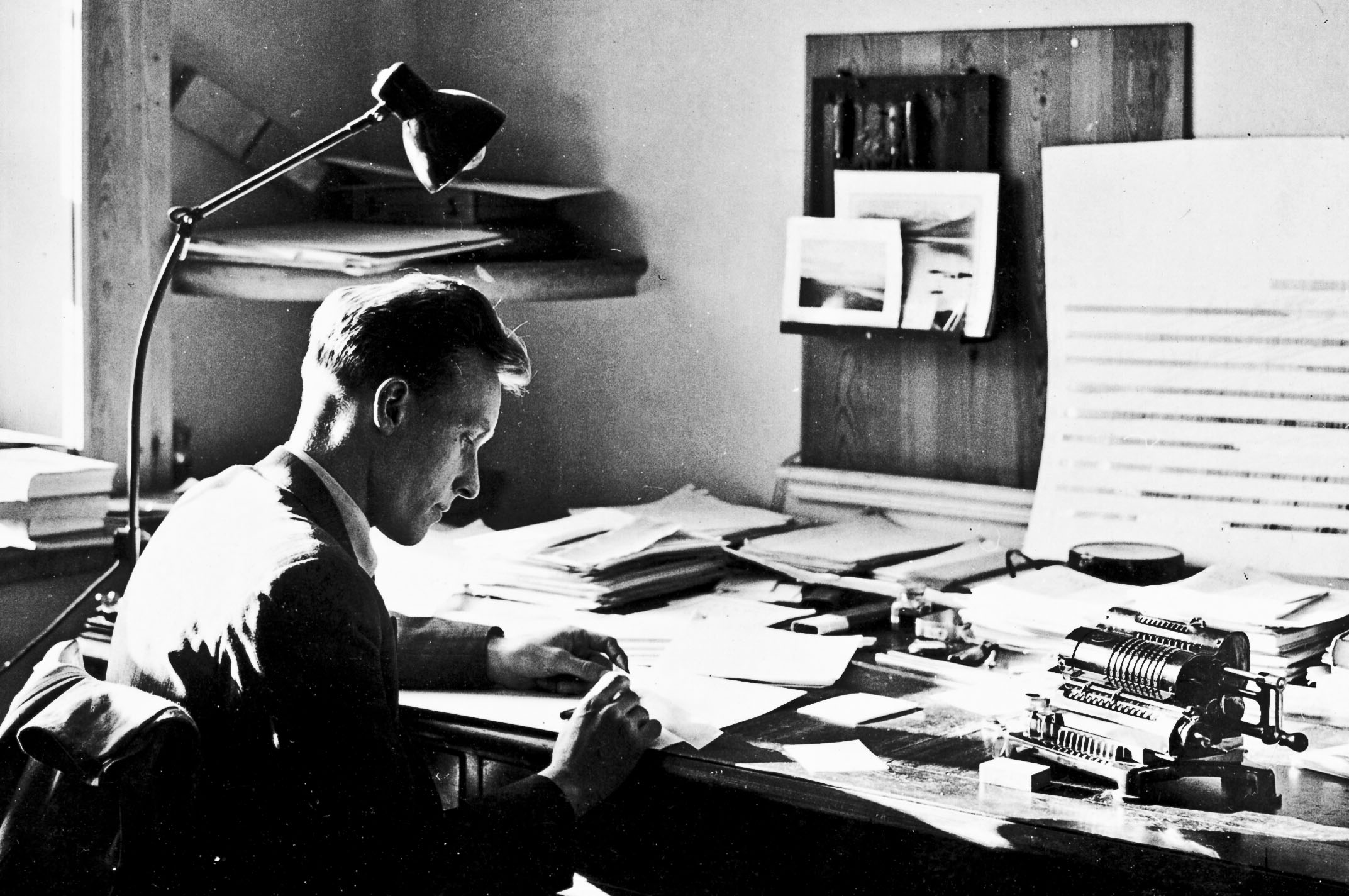
Bengt Edlen, Lund University, at his desk, c. 1940

Bengt Edlén was born on 2 November 1906 in Gusum, Sweden. He graduated from high school in Norrköping in 1926 and entered the Uppsala University the same year. He was awarded his bachelor's degree after three semester and graduated with a PhD in 1934 with his thesis about the spectra and energy of the elements in the beginning of the periodic system.

He received international fame after finding unidentified spectral lines in the Sun's spectrum which were speculatively believed to originate from a hitherto unidentified chemical element termed coronium. Edlén later showed that those lines are from multiply ionized iron (Fe-XIV). His discovery was not immediately accepted, since the alleged ionization required a temperature of millions of degrees. Later such solar corona temperatures were verified. He also made an important contribution in analyzing spectra of Wolf–Rayet stars.

Edlén was professor at Lund University from 1944 to 1973. He was elected a member of the Royal Swedish Academy of Sciences in 1947. He received the Gold Medal of the Royal Astronomical Society 1945 for the solution of the Corona Mystery, the Howard N. Potts Medal in 1946 for researches in the extreme ultraviolet, and the Henry Draper Medal of the National Academy of Sciences in 1968.
