= Gottfried Osann =

German chemist and physicist (1796–1866)

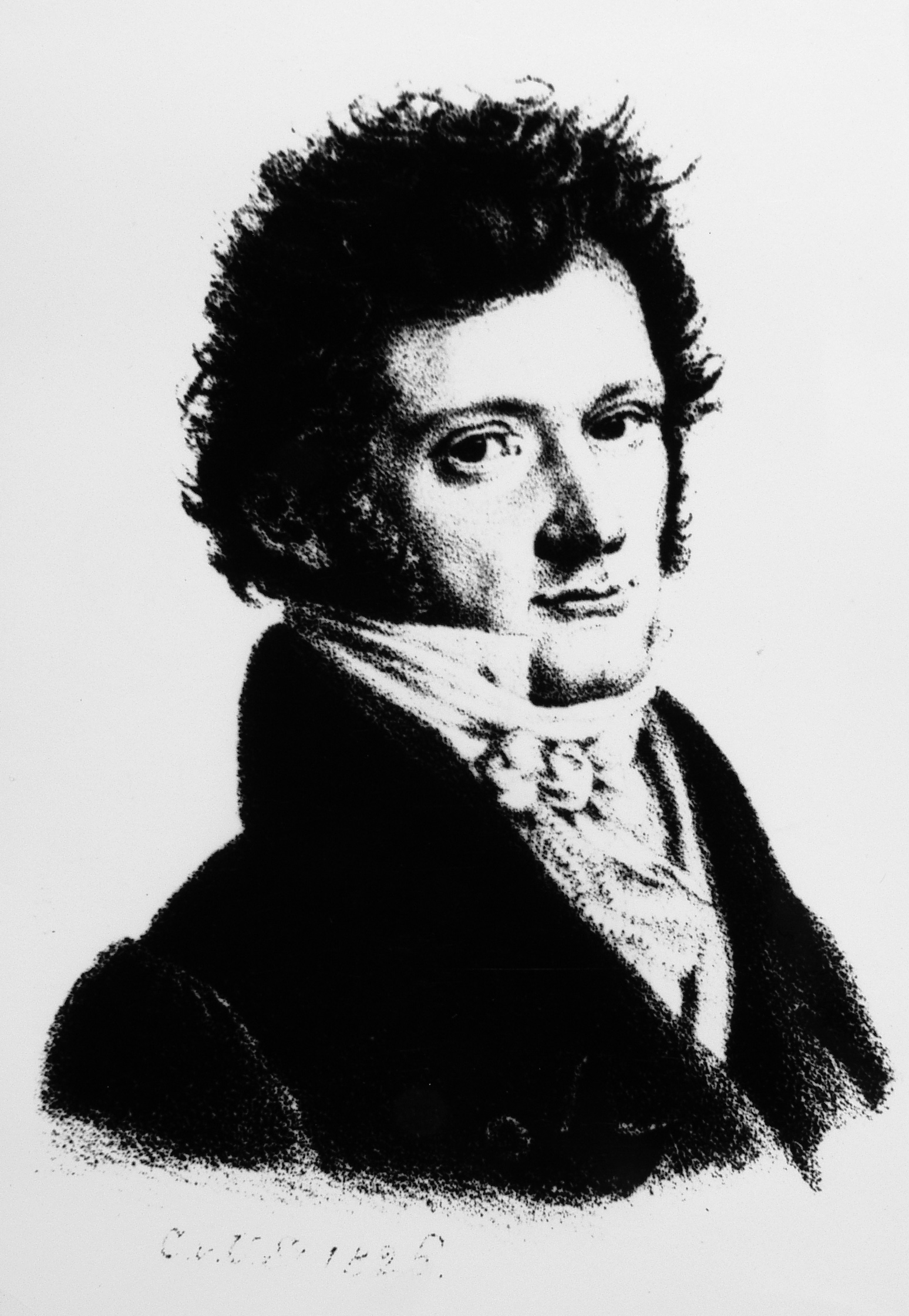
Gottfried Wilhelm Osann

Gottfried Wilhelm Osann (26 October 1796, Weimar – 10 August 1866, Würzburg) was a German chemist and physicist. He is known for his work on the chemistry of platinum metals.

He studied natural sciences and became a privatdozent in physics and chemistry at the University of Erlangen in 1819. Between 1821 and 1823, he occupied the same position at the University of Jena. He taught chemistry and medicine at the University of Dorpat (Dorpat, Governorate of Livonia, Russian Empire; today Tartu, Estonia) from 1823 to 1828, from 1828 at the University of Würzburg.

A collaboration with Jöns Jakob Berzelius nearly led to the discovery of ruthenium in 1828. They dissolved platinum ore from the Ural Mountains in aqua regia and sifted through the residue. Where Berzelius found nothing, Osann thought he had detected three new metals and named them pluranium (concatenation of platinum and Ural), ruthenium (after Ruthenia, the Latin name for Rus) and polinium (from the Greek word polia, meaning grey-haired, for its residue color; not to be confused with polonium, discovered later). However, the quantity of the metals was too small to isolate, and Osann eventually withdrew his discovery claims. It was up to the Russian chemist Karl Klaus to verify their existence, which he did in 1844 by isolating measurable quantities of ruthenium. For this reason, Klaus is usually named as the discoverer of ruthenium rather than Osann.

He was the brother of balneologist Emil Osann (1787-1842) and philologist Friedrich Gotthilf Osann (1794-1858).
