= William Harkness =

Scottish-American astronomer (1837–1903)

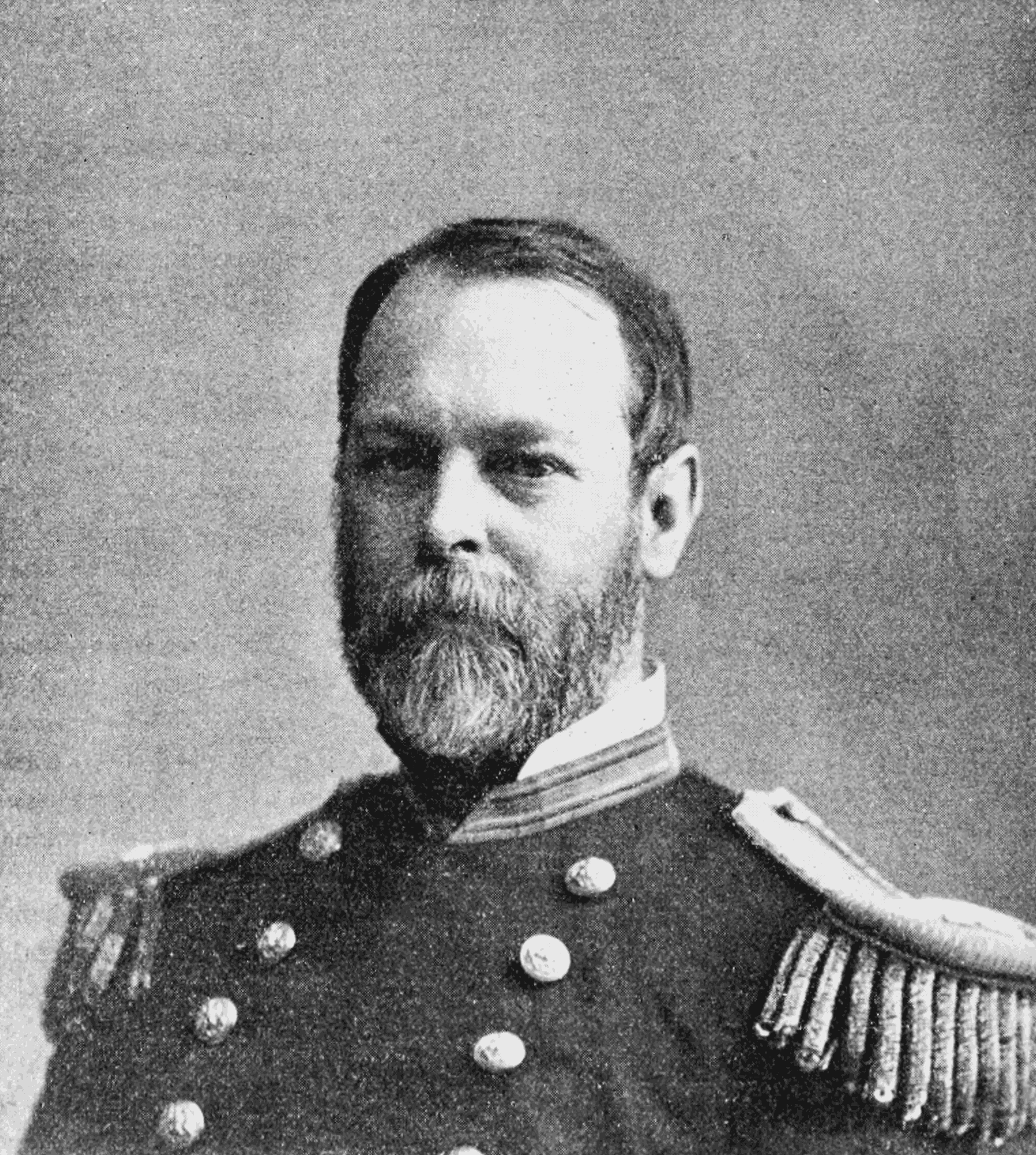
- Born: December 17, 1837; Ecclefechan, Scotland
- Died: February 28, 1903 (aged 65); Jersey City, New Jersey
- Military career
- Allegiance: United States of America
- Branch: Union Army; Union Navy; United States Navy
- Service years: 1862–1899
- Rank: Rear Admiral
- Conflicts: American Civil War

William Harkness (December 17, 1837 – February 28, 1903) was an astronomer. He was born at Ecclefechan, Scotland, a son of James (1803–78) and Jane (née Wield) Harkness. His father was a pastor and moved the family to the United States. Harkness served in the military, traveled extensively, and headed research missions developing techniques and equipment for astronomical study.

Harkness died at his home in Jersey City on February 28, 1903, at the age of 65.

== Biography ==
Raised in Fishkill Landing, New York, Harkness was educated at Lafayette College (September 1854 – January 1856), graduated from the University of Rochester (1858) where he was a brother of Delta Kappa Epsilon, and then studied medicine in New York City. In 1862, Harkness graduated from the New York Homeopathic Medical College. In August 1862, he served as volunteer surgeon for the Union Army at the Second Battle of Bull Run. From 1862 to 1865, Harkness was an "aid in astronomy" at the United States Naval Observatory. In August 1863, Harkness was commissioned as a professor of mathematics in the United States Navy with the relative rank of lieutenant commander. In July 1864, he served as a military surgeon during the Battle of Fort Stevens. In 1865, Harkness was conferred an A.M. degree ad eundem by Lafayette College. After service on the monitor USS Monadnock from 1865 to 1866, he was employed in the United States Hydrographic Office.

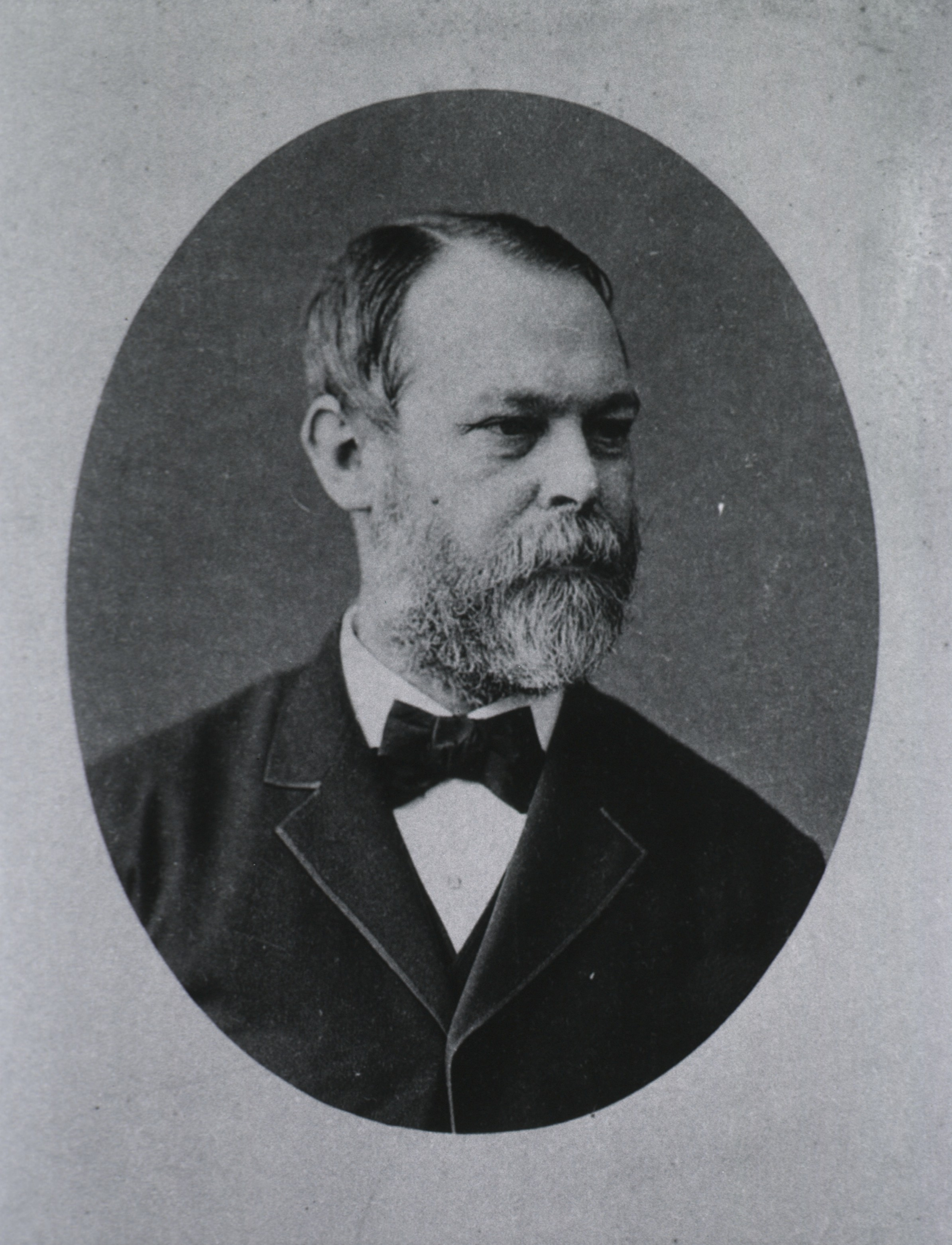
William Harkness profile.

During the eclipse of August 1869, Harkness discovered the coronal line K 1474. Three years later he was made a member of the Transit of Venus Commission, and had charge of the party at Hobart, Tasmania in 1879 and at Washington in 1882, when he became the executive officer. In 1874, Harkness was conferred an honorary LL.D. degree by the University of Rochester. He was elected to the American Philosophical Society in 1898. His most memorable accomplishments are related to the construction of telescopes, his theory of the focal curve of achromatic telescopes, and his invention of the spherometer caliper and other astronomical instruments. He was astronomical director of the Naval Observatory (1894–99) and director of the Nautical Almanac (1897–99). Harkness retired from the navy two days after attaining the relative rank of rear admiral (December 1899), having reached the mandatory retirement age of sixty-two. He was a member of the American Society of Mechanical Engineers (1891) and president of the American Association for the Advancement of Science (1893). Of his works, The Solar Parallax and its Related Constants (1891) is the most important.

== Legacy ==
Two U.S. Navy vessels have been named Harkness in his honor.

Harkness Hall at the University of Rochester is named in his honor.
