= Charles Augustus Young =

American astronomer (1834–1908)

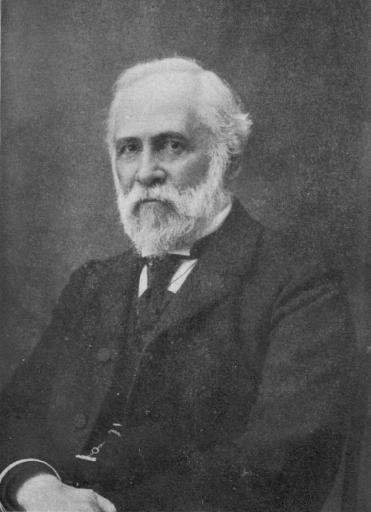
- Born: December 15, 1834; Hanover, New Hampshire
- Died: January 3, 1908 (aged 73); Hanover, New Hampshire
- Education: Dartmouth College
- Awards: Janssen Medal (1890)
- Scientific career
- Fields: astronomy
- Workplaces: Princeton University; Western Reserve University
- Doctoral students: Henry Norris Russell

Charles Augustus Young (December 15, 1834 – January 4, 1908) one of the foremost solar spectroscopist astronomers in the United States. He observed solar eclipses and worked on spectroscopy of the Sun. He observed a solar flare with a spectroscope on 3 August 1872, and also noted that it coincided with a magnetic storm on Earth.

Young graduated from Dartmouth College in 1853. For two years, he taught classes at Phillips Academy in Andover, Massachusetts. The following year, he studied at the theological seminary in Andover, while also continuing to teach.

In 1857, he became the Professor of Mathematics and Natural Philosophy at Western Reserve College, now known as Case Western Reserve University, devoting nine years. Young's name is inscribed on the Loomis Observatory, which is the oldest observatory in the United States still remaining in its original location.

In 1862, he served in the 85th Regiment of Ohio during the Civil War.

He was elected as a member to the American Philosophical Society in 1874.

in 1865, he became a professor at his alma mater, Dartmouth, remaining until 1877 when he went to teach at Princeton University.

He was a successful educator who wrote a popular and widely used series of astronomy textbooks, including Manual of Astronomy. In 1927, when Henry Norris Russell, Raymond Smith Dugan and John Quincy Stewart wrote their own two-volume textbook, they entitled it Astronomy: A Revision of Young's Manual of Astronomy.

Young died of pneumonia after a brief illness, at his home in Hanover, New Hampshire, on 4 January 1908.

Mount Young in Sequoia National Park, California was named in his honor in 1909.

== Gallery ==
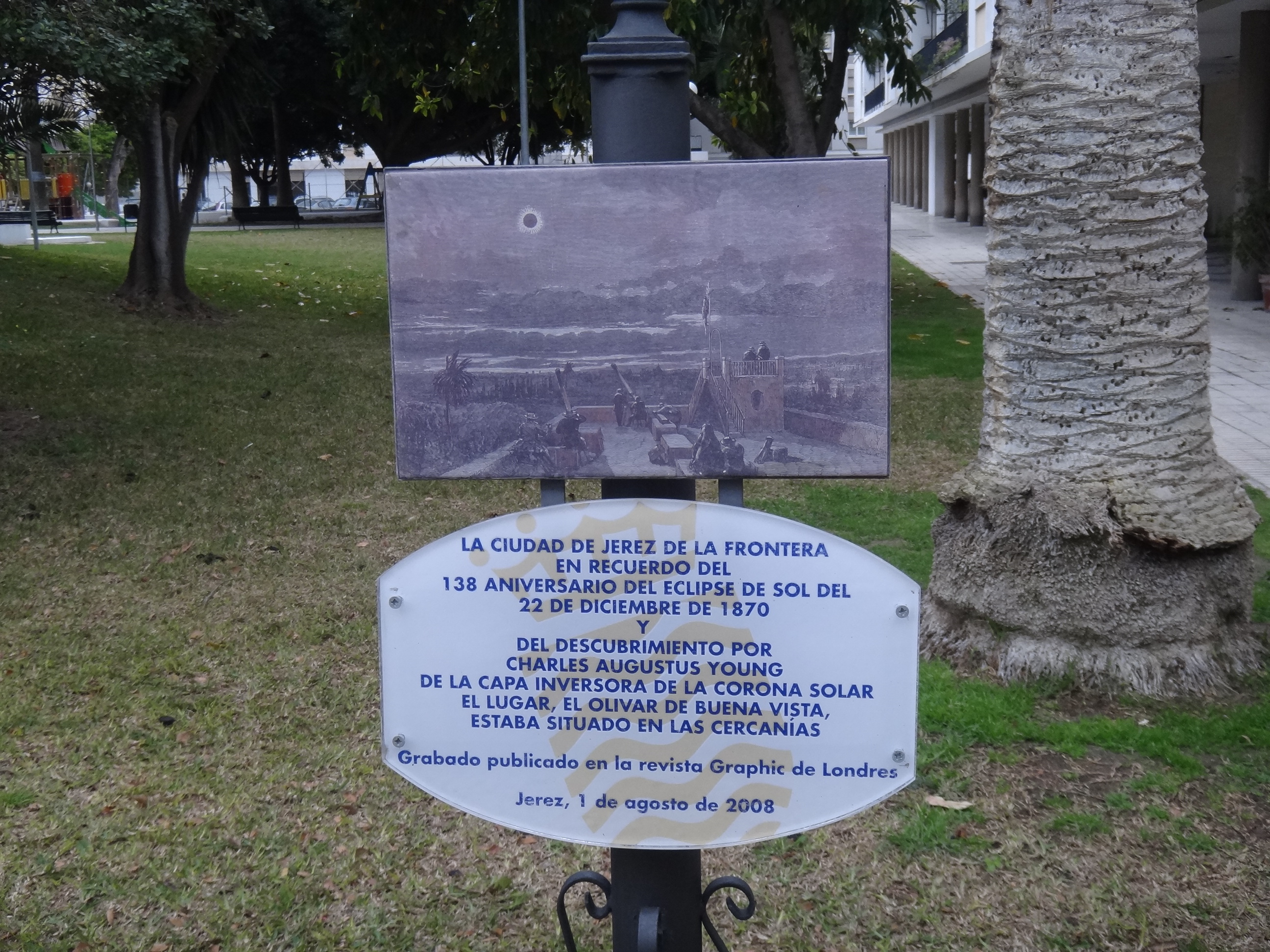
Plaque for one of Charles' discoveries.
