= Rare-earth element =

Any of the fifteen lanthanides plus scandium and yttrium

External media

Audio
- "Rare Earths: The Hidden Cost to Their Magic", Distillations Podcast and transcript, Episode 242, June 25, 2019, Science History Institute

Video
- "10 ways rare earth elements make life better", animation, Science History Institute
- "Rare-Earth Elements: The Intersection of Science and Society", presentation and discussion led by Ira Flatow, Science History Institute, September 24, 2019

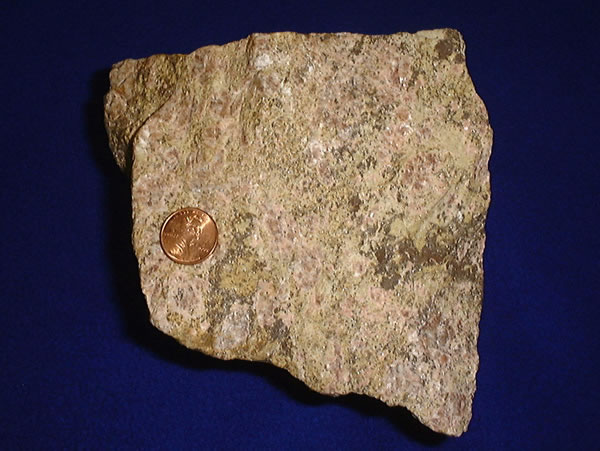
Rare-earth ore (shown with a 19 mm diameter US 1 cent coin for size comparison)

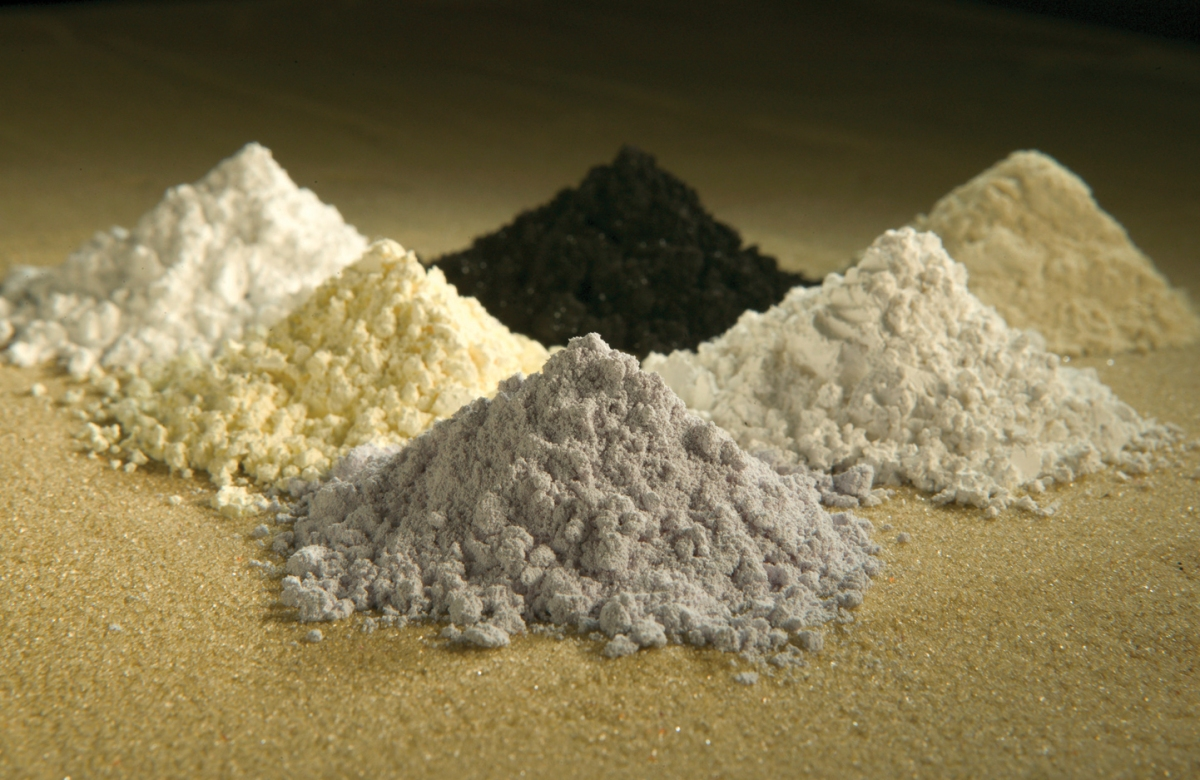
Refined rare-earth oxides are heavy, gritty powders usually brown or black, but can be lighter colors as shown here.
Back row: gadolinium · praseodymium · cerium
Middle row: samarium · lanthanum
Front: neodymium

The rare-earth elements (REE), also called rare-earth metals, or rare earths, are a set of 17 nearly indistinguishable lustrous silvery-white soft heavy metals. The 15 lanthanides (or lanthanoids), along with scandium, and yttrium, are usually included as rare earths. Compounds containing rare-earth elements have diverse applications in electrical and electronic components, lasers, glass, magnetic materials, and industrial processes. Rare-earths are to be distinguished from critical minerals, which are materials of strategic or economic importance that are defined differently by different countries, (Note: However many countries, including the United States, designate REEs as critical minerals.) and rare-earth minerals, which are minerals that contain one or more rare-earth elements as major metal constituents.

The term "rare-earth" is a misnomer, because they are not actually scarce, but because they are found only in compounds, not as pure metals, and are difficult to isolate and purify. REEs are relatively plentiful in the entire Earth's crust (cerium being the 25th-most-abundant element at 68 parts per million, more abundant than copper), but in practice they are spread thinly as trace impurities, so to obtain rare earths at usable purity requires processing enormous amounts of raw ore which is costly and energy intensive.

Scandium and yttrium are considered rare-earth elements because they tend to occur in the same ore deposits as the lanthanides and exhibit similar chemical properties, but have different electrical and magnetic properties. Promethium does not occur naturally in the Earth's crust, except for a trace amount generated by spontaneous fission of uranium-238. All isotopes of promethium are radioactive.

REEs are often found in minerals with thorium, and less commonly uranium. The co-occurrence of rare earth elements with radioactive mining deposits has spurred some nations to have greater consciousness about pollution and human rights considerations.

Because of their geochemical properties, rare-earth elements are typically dispersed and not often found concentrated in rare-earth minerals. Consequently, economically exploitable ore deposits are sparse. The first rare-earth mineral discovered (1787) was gadolinite, a black mineral composed of cerium, yttrium, iron, silicon, and other elements. This mineral was extracted from a mine in the village of Ytterby in Sweden. Four of the rare-earth elements bear names derived from this single location. Commercial production in modern times describes the reserves of the rare-earth elements in terms of "rare-earth oxides" (REOs) containing mixtures of various rare-earth elements in oxide compounds.

The uses, applications, and demand for rare-earth elements have expanded over the years. In 2015, most REEs were being used for catalysts and magnets. The global move towards renewable energy technologies, such as electric vehicles (EVs) and wind turbines, along with advanced electronics, defence applications, and consumer electronics such as smartphones, has caused increased demand for REEs.

REE extraction and processing can result in anthropogenic environmental enrichment. Effects of REE pollution on human and environmental health are still being explored. In recent years, there has been a sharp increase in published research on the health impacts as scholars call for more work to bridge gaps in available data.

China dominates the rest of the world in terms of REE reserves and production; in 2019, it supplied around 90% of the global demand for the 17 rare-earth powders. The Chinese government has placed restrictions on its supply and sales of REEs since around 2010 for various reasons. After United States President Donald Trump escalated the trade war with China in 2025, China introduced further restrictions, leading other countries with known reserves to step up their exploration and production efforts. As of 2025, the US and Australia produce the second- and third-highest amounts of REEs, but Brazil has the second-largest reserves of the metals. A U.S. defense procurement restriction is scheduled to take effect in January 2027, prohibiting the use of Chinese-origin rare-earth metals and magnets in U.S. defense systems.

== History ==
=== 1787: Discovery ===
Rare earths were mainly discovered as components of minerals. The term "rare" refers to these rarely found minerals and "earth" comes from an old name for oxides, the chemical form for these elements in the mineral. The adjective "rare" may also mean strange or extraordinary.

In 1787, a mineral discovered by Lieutenant Carl Axel Arrhenius at a quarry in the village of Ytterby, Sweden, reached Johan Gadolin, a Royal Academy of Turku professor, and his analysis yielded an unknown oxide which he called yttria.

=== 1794–1878: Chemical isolation ===
Anders Gustav Ekeberg, Swedish analytical chemist, chemically isolated the beryllium from the gadolinite but failed to recognize other elements in the ore. After this discovery in 1794, a mineral from Bastnäs near Riddarhyttan, Sweden, which was believed to be an iron–tungsten mineral, was re-examined by Jöns Jacob Berzelius and Wilhelm Hisinger. In 1803, they obtained a white oxide and called it ceria. Martin Heinrich Klaproth independently discovered the same oxide and called it ochroia. It took another 30 years for researchers to determine that other elements were contained in the two ores ceria and yttria. The similarity of the rare-earth metals' chemical properties made their separation difficult.

In 1839, Carl Gustav Mosander, an assistant of Berzelius, separated ceria by heating the nitrate and dissolving the product in nitric acid. He called the oxide of the soluble salt lanthana. It took him three more years to separate the lanthana further into didymia and pure lanthana. Didymia, although not further separable by Mosander's techniques, was in fact still a mixture of oxides.

In 1842, Mosander separated the yttria into three oxides: pure yttria, terbia, and erbia. All the names are derived from the town name "Ytterby". The earth giving pink salts he called terbium. The one that yielded yellow peroxide he called erbium. By then the number of known rare-earth elements had reached six: yttrium, cerium, lanthanum, didymium, erbium, and terbium.

Nils Johan Berlin and Marc Delafontaine tried also to separate the crude yttria and found the same substances that Mosander obtained. In 1860, Berlin named the substance giving pink salts erbium. Delafontaine named the substance with the yellow peroxide, terbium. This confusion led to several false claims of new elements, such as the mosandrium of J. Lawrence Smith, or the philippium and decipium of Delafontaine. Due to the difficulty in separating the metals, and determining the separation is complete, the total number of false discoveries was dozens, with some putting the total number of discoveries at over a hundred.

=== 1879–1930s: Spectroscopic identification ===
There were no further discoveries for 30 years, and the element didymium was listed in the periodic table of elements with a molecular mass of 138. In 1879, Delafontaine used the new physical process of optical flame spectroscopy and found several new spectral lines in didymia. Also in 1879, Paul Émile Lecoq de Boisbaudran isolated the new element samarium from the mineral samarskite.

In 1886, the samaria earth was further separated by Lecoq de Boisbaudran. A similar result was obtained by Jean Charles Galissard de Marignac by direct isolation from samarskite. They named the element gadolinium after Johan Gadolin, and its oxide was named "gadolinia".

Further spectroscopic analysis between 1886 and 1901 of samaria, yttria, and samarskite by William Crookes, Lecoq de Boisbaudran and Eugène-Anatole Demarçay yielded several new spectral lines that indicated the existence of an unknown element. In 1901, the fractional crystallization of the oxides yielded europium.

In 1839, the third source for rare earths became available. This is a mineral similar to gadolinite called uranotantalum, now called "samarskite", an oxide of a mixture of elements such as yttrium, ytterbium, iron, uranium, thorium, calcium, niobium, and tantalum. This mineral from Miass in the southern Ural Mountains was documented by Gustav Rose. The Russian chemist R. Harmann proposed that a new element he called "ilmenium" should be present in this mineral, but later, Christian Wilhelm Blomstrand, Galissard de Marignac, and Heinrich Rose found only tantalum and niobium (columbium) in it.

The exact number of rare-earth elements that existed was highly unclear, and a maximum number of 25 was estimated. Using X-ray spectra Henry Gwyn Jeffreys Moseley confirmed the atomic theory of Niels Bohr and simultaneously developed the theory of atomic numbers for the elements. Moseley found that the exact number of lanthanides had to be 15, revealing a missing element, element 61, a radioactive element with a half-life of 18 years which would be first produced and characterized in 1945.

Using these facts about atomic numbers from X-ray crystallography, Moseley also showed that hafnium (element 72) would not be a rare-earth element. Moseley was killed in World War I in 1915, years before hafnium was discovered. Hence, the claim of Georges Urbain that he had discovered element 72 was untrue. Hafnium is an element that lies in the periodic table immediately below zirconium, and hafnium and zirconium have very similar chemical and physical properties.

=== 1940s onwards: Purification ===
In the 1940s, Frank Spedding and others in the United States, during the Manhattan Project, developed chemical ion-exchange procedures for separating and purifying rare-earth elements. This method was first applied to the actinides for separating plutonium-239 and neptunium from uranium, thorium, actinium, and the other actinides in the materials produced in nuclear reactors. Plutonium-239 was very desirable because it is a fissile material.

The missing element 61, Promethium, was produced synthetically in 1945, becoming the last rare earth element to be discovered. It does not occur in significant quantities in nature.

Between 1985 and 1995 China increased its share in the production of REE from 21% to 60%. The causes of this rise are attributed to tax reduction, favourable credits with were further aided by low labour costs and a lack of environmental regulation.

== Etymology ==
The term "rare" in "rare-earth" is a misnomer because they are not actually scarce, but rather because they are only found in compounds, not as pure metals, or perhaps because they were considered exotic at the time of their discovery. The "earth" part refers to an old term for minerals that dissolve in acids and thus are stable to oxidation. They are never found in highly concentrated form, usually being mixed together with one another, or with radioactive elements such as uranium and thorium, and can only be separated from other materials or one another with difficulty. This makes them difficult to purify.

== List of rare-earth elements ==
Rare-earth elements or minerals are distinct from minerals or materials described as critical minerals or raw materials, which refers to materials that are considered to be of strategic or economic importance to a country. There is no single list, but individual governments compile lists of materials that are critical for their own economies.

A table listing the 17 rare-earth elements, their atomic number and symbol, the etymology of their names, and their main uses (see also Applications of lanthanides) is provided here. Some of the rare-earth elements are named after the scientists who discovered them, or elucidated their elemental properties, and some after the geographical locations where discovered.

Overview of rare-earth metal properties
Z	Symbol	Name	Etymology	Selected applications	Abundance (ppm (Note: Parts per million in Earth's crust, e.g. Pb=13 ppm))
21	Sc	Scandium	from Latin Scandia (Scandinavia).	Light aluminium-scandium alloys for aerospace components, additive in metal-halide lamps and mercury-vapor lamps, radioactive tracing agent in oil refineries	22
39	Y	Yttrium	after the village of Ytterby, Sweden, where the first rare-earth ore was discovered.	Yttrium aluminium garnet (YAG) laser, yttrium vanadate (YVO_{4}) as host for europium in television red phosphor, YBCO high-temperature superconductors, yttria-stabilized zirconia (YSZ) (used in tooth crowns; as refractory material - in metal alloys used in jet engines, and coatings of engines and industrial gas turbines; electroceramics - for measuring oxygen and pH of hot water solutions, i.e. in fuel cells; ceramic electrolyte - used in solid oxide fuel cell; jewelry - for its hardness and optical properties; do-it-yourself high temperature ceramics and cements based on water), yttrium iron garnet (YIG) microwave filters, energy-efficient light bulbs (part of triphosphor white phosphor coating in fluorescent tubes, CFLs and CCFLs, and yellow phosphor coating in white LEDs), spark plugs, gas mantles, additive to steel, aluminium and magnesium alloys, cancer treatments, camera and refractive telescope lenses (due to high refractive index and very low thermal expansion), battery cathodes (LYP)	33
57	La	Lanthanum	from the Greek "lanthanein", meaning to be hidden.	High refractive index and alkali-resistant glass, flint, hydrogen storage, battery-electrodes, camera and refractive telescope lenses, fluid catalytic cracking catalyst for oil refineries	39
58	Ce	Cerium	after the dwarf planet Ceres, named after the Roman goddess of agriculture.	Chemical oxidizing agent, polishing powder, yellow colors in glass and ceramics, catalyst for self-cleaning ovens, fluid catalytic cracking catalyst for oil refineries, ferrocerium flints for lighters, robust intrinsically hydrophobic coatings for turbine blades	66.5
59	Pr	Praseodymium	from the Greek "prasios", meaning leek-green, and "didymos", meaning twin.	Rare-earth magnets, lasers, core material for carbon arc lighting, colorant in glasses and enamels, additive in didymium glass used in welding goggles, ferrocerium firesteel (flint) products, single-mode fiber optical amplifiers (as a dopant of fluoride glass)	9.2
60	Nd	Neodymium	from the Greek "neos", meaning new, and "didymos", meaning twin.	Rare-earth magnets, lasers, violet colors in glass and ceramics, didymium glass, ceramic capacitors, electric motors in electric automobiles	41.5
61	Pm	Promethium	after the Titan Prometheus, who brought fire to mortals.	Nuclear batteries, luminous paint	1×10^{−15} (Note: Promethium has no stable isotopes or primordial radioisotopes; trace quantities occur in nature as fission products.)
62	Sm	Samarium	after mine official, Vasili Samarsky-Bykhovets.	Rare-earth magnets, lasers, neutron capture, masers, control rods of nuclear reactors	7.05
63	Eu	Europium	after the continent of Europe.	Red and blue phosphors, lasers, mercury-vapor lamps, fluorescent lamps, NMR relaxation agent	2
64	Gd	Gadolinium	after Johan Gadolin (1760–1852), to honor his investigation of rare earths.	High refractive index glass or garnets, lasers, X-ray tubes, computer bubble memories, neutron capture, MRI contrast agent, NMR relaxation agent, steel and chromium alloys additive, magnetic refrigeration (using significant magnetocaloric effect), positron emission tomography scintillator detectors, a substrate for magneto-optical films, high performance high-temperature superconductors, ceramic electrolyte used in solid oxide fuel cells, oxygen detectors, possibly in catalytic conversion of automobile fumes.	6.2
65	Tb	Terbium	after the village of Ytterby, Sweden.	Additive in neodymium based magnets, green phosphors, lasers, fluorescent lamps (as part of the white triband phosphor coating), magnetostrictive alloys such as terfenol-D, naval sonar systems, stabilizer of fuel cells	1.2
66	Dy	Dysprosium	from the Greek "dysprositos", meaning hard to get.	Additive in neodymium based magnets, lasers, magnetostrictive alloys such as terfenol-D, hard disk drives	5.2
67	Ho	Holmium	after Stockholm (in Latin, "Holmia"), the native city of one of its discoverers.	Lasers, wavelength calibration standards for optical spectrophotometers, magnetic fields,permanent magnets.	1.3
68	Er	Erbium	after the village of Ytterby, Sweden.	Infrared lasers, vanadium steel, fiber-optic technology	3.5
69	Tm	Thulium	after the mythological northern land of Thule.	Portable X-ray machines, metal-halide lamps, lasers	0.52
70	Yb	Ytterbium	after the village of Ytterby, Sweden.	Infrared lasers, chemical reducing agent, decoy flares, stainless steel, strain gauges, nuclear medicine, earthquake monitoring	3.2
71	Lu	Lutetium	after Lutetia, the city that later became Paris.	Positron emission tomography – PET scan detectors, high-refractive-index glass, lutetium tantalate hosts for phosphors, catalyst used in refineries, LED light bulb	0.8

=== Classification ===
Before the time that ion exchange methods and elution were available, the separation of the rare earths was primarily achieved by repeated precipitation or crystallization. In those days, the first separation was into two main groups, the cerium earths (lanthanum, cerium, praseodymium, neodymium, and samarium) and the yttrium earths (scandium, yttrium, dysprosium, holmium, erbium, thulium, ytterbium, and lutetium).

Europium, gadolinium, and terbium were either considered as a separate group of rare-earth elements (the terbium group), or europium was included in the cerium group, and gadolinium and terbium were included in the yttrium group. In the latter case, the f-block elements are split into half: the first half (La–Eu) form the cerium group, and the second half (Gd–Yb) together with group 3 (Sc, Y, Lu) form the yttrium group.

The reason for this division arose from the difference in solubility of rare-earth double sulfates with sodium and potassium. The sodium double sulfates of the cerium group are poorly soluble, those of the terbium group slightly, and those of the yttrium group are very soluble. Sometimes, the yttrium group was further split into the erbium group (dysprosium, holmium, erbium, and thulium) and the ytterbium group (ytterbium and lutetium), but today the main grouping is between the cerium and the yttrium groups. Today, the rare-earth elements are classified as light or heavy rare-earth elements, rather than in cerium and yttrium groups.

==== Light versus heavy classification ====
The classification of rare-earth elements is inconsistent between authors. The most common distinction between rare-earth elements is made by atomic numbers. Those with low atomic numbers are referred to as light rare-earth elements (LREE), those with high atomic numbers are the heavy rare-earth elements (HREE), and those that fall in between are typically referred to as the middle rare-earth elements (MREE). Commonly, rare-earth elements with atomic numbers 57 to 61 (lanthanum to promethium) are classified as light and those with atomic numbers 62 and greater are classified as heavy rare-earth elements.

Increasing atomic numbers between light and heavy rare-earth elements and decreasing atomic radii throughout the series causes chemical variations. Europium is exempt of this classification as it has two valence states: Eu^{2+} and Eu^{3+}. Yttrium is grouped as a heavy rare-earth element due to chemical similarities. The break between the two groups is sometimes put elsewhere, such as between elements 63 (europium) and 64 (gadolinium). The actual metallic densities of these two groups overlap, with the "light" group having densities from 6.145 (lanthanum) to 7.26 (promethium) or 7.52 (samarium) g/cc, and the "heavy" group from 6.965 (ytterbium) to 9.32 (thulium), as well as including yttrium at 4.47. Europium has a density of 5.24.

==== Geochemical classification ====
The REE geochemical classification is usually done on the basis of their atomic weight. One of the most common classifications divides REE into 3 groups: light rare earths (LREE - from _{57}La to _{60}Nd), intermediate (MREE - from _{62}Sm to _{67}Ho) and heavy (HREE - from _{68}Er to _{71}Lu). REE usually appear as trivalent ions, except for Ce and Eu which can take the form of Ce^{4+} and Eu^{2+} depending on the redox conditions of the system. Consequentially, REE are characterized by a substantial identity in their chemical reactivity, which results in a serial behaviour during geochemical processes rather than being characteristic of a single element of the series. Sc, Y, and Lu can be electronically distinguished from the other rare earths because they do not have f valence electrons, whereas the others do, but the chemical behaviour is almost the same.

A distinguishing factor in the geochemical behaviour of the REE is linked to the so-called "lanthanide contraction" which represents a higher-than-expected decrease in the atomic/ionic radius of the elements along the series. This is determined by the variation of the shielding effect towards the nuclear charge due to the progressive filling of the 4f orbital which acts against the electrons of the 6s and 5d orbitals. The lanthanide contraction has a direct effect on the geochemistry of the lanthanides, which show a different behaviour depending on the systems and processes in which they are involved.

The effect of the lanthanide contraction can be observed in the REE behaviour both in a CHARAC-type geochemical system (CHArge-and-RAdius-Controlled) where elements with similar charge and radius should show coherent geochemical behaviour, and in non-CHARAC systems, such as aqueous solutions, where the electron structure is also an important parameter to consider as the lanthanide contraction affects the ionic potential. A direct consequence is that, during the formation of coordination bonds, the REE behaviour gradually changes along the series. Furthermore, the lanthanide contraction causes the ionic radius of Ho^{3+} (0.901 Å) to be almost identical to that of Y^{3+} (0.9 Å), justifying the inclusion of the latter among the REE.

=== Origin of rare-earth elements ===
Rare-earth elements, except scandium, are heavier than iron and thus are produced by the r-process, which mostly takes place in neutron star mergers, or by the s-process in asymptotic giant branch stars. In nature, spontaneous fission of uranium-238 produces trace amounts of radioactive promethium, but most promethium is synthetically produced in nuclear reactors. Due to their chemical similarity, the concentrations of rare earths in rocks are only slowly changed by geochemical processes, making their proportions useful for geochronology and dating fossils.

The principal sources of rare-earth elements are the minerals bastnäsite (RCO_{3}F, where R is a mixture of rare-earth elements), monazite (XPO_{4}, where X is a mixture of rare-earth elements and sometimes thorium), and loparite ((Ce,Na,Ca)(Ti,Nb)O_{3}), and the lateritic ion-adsorption clays. Despite their high relative abundance, rare-earth minerals are more difficult to mine and extract than equivalent sources of transition metals, due in part to their similar chemical properties, making the rare-earth elements relatively expensive. Their industrial use was very limited until efficient separation techniques were developed, such as ion exchange, fractional crystallization, and liquid–liquid extraction in the late 1950s and early 1960s.Some ilmenite concentrates contain small amounts of scandium and other rare-earth elements, which could be analysed by X-ray fluorescence (XRF).

=== Properties ===
According to chemist Andrea Sella in 2016, rare-earth elements differ from other elements, in that when looked at analytically, they are virtually inseparable, having almost the same chemical properties. However, in terms of their electronic and magnetic properties, each one occupies a unique technological niche that nothing else can. For example, "the rare-earth elements praseodymium (Pr) and neodymium (Nd) can both be embedded inside glass and they completely cut out the glare from the flame when one is doing glass-blowing."

Scandium and yttrium are considered rare-earth elements because they tend to occur in the same ore deposits as the lanthanides and exhibit similar chemical properties, but have different electrical and magnetic properties.

Rare-earth metals tarnish slowly in air at room temperature and react slowly with cold water to form hydroxides, liberating hydrogen. They react with steam to form oxides and ignite spontaneously at a temperature of 400 °C (752 °F). These elements and their compounds have no biological function other than in several specialized enzymes, such as in lanthanide-dependent methanol dehydrogenases in bacteria. The water-soluble compounds are mildly to moderately toxic, but the insoluble ones are not. All isotopes of promethium are radioactive, and it does not occur naturally in the earth's crust, except for a trace amount generated by spontaneous fission of uranium-238. They are often found in minerals with thorium, and less commonly uranium.

=== Rare-earth compounds ===
Rare-earth elements occur in nature in combination with phosphate (monazite), carbonate-fluoride (bastnäsite), and oxygen anions.

In their oxides, most rare-earth elements only have a valence of 3 and form sesquioxides (cerium forms CeO_{2}). Five different crystal structures are known, depending on the element and the temperature. The X-phase and the H-phase are only stable above 2000 K. At lower temperatures, there are the hexagonal A-phase, the monoclinic B-phase, and the cubic C-phase, which is the stable form at room temperature for most of the elements. The C-phase was once thought to be in space group I2_{1}3 (no. 199), but is now known to be in space group Ia3̅ (no. 206).

The structure is similar to that of fluorite or cerium dioxide (in which the cations form a face-centred cubic lattice and the anions sit inside the tetrahedra of cations), except that one-quarter of the anions (oxygen) are missing. The unit cell of these sesquioxides corresponds to eight unit cells of fluorite or cerium dioxide, with 32 cations instead of 4. This is called the bixbyite structure, as it occurs in a mineral of that name ((Mn,Fe)_{2}O_{3}).

== Geological distribution ==
The abundance of elements in Earth's crust per million Si atoms (y axis is logarithmic)

The rare-earth elements are found on Earth at similar concentrations to many common transition metals. The most abundant rare-earth element is cerium, which is actually the 25th most abundant element in Earth's crust, having 68 parts per million (more common than copper). The exception is the highly unstable and radioactive promethium "rare earth" that is quite scarce. The longest-lived isotope of promethium has a half-life of 17.7 years, so the element exists in nature in only negligible amounts (approximately 572 g in the Earth's entire crust). Promethium is one of the two elements that do not have stable (non-radioactive) isotopes and are followed by (i.e. with higher atomic number) stable elements (the other being technetium).

The rare-earth elements are often found together. During the sequential accretion of the Earth, the dense rare-earth elements were incorporated into the deeper portions of the planet. Early differentiation of molten material largely incorporated the rare earths into mantle rocks. The high field strength and large ionic radii of rare earths make them incompatible with the crystal lattices of most rock-forming minerals, so REE will undergo strong partitioning into a melt phase if one is present.

REE are chemically very similar and have always been difficult to separate, but the gradual decrease in ionic radius from light REE (LREE) to heavy REE (HREE), called the lanthanide contraction, can produce a broad separation between light and heavy REE. The larger ionic radii of LREE make them generally more incompatible than HREE in rock-forming minerals, and will partition more strongly into a melt phase, while HREE may prefer to remain in the crystalline residue, particularly if it contains HREE-compatible minerals like garnet. The result is that all magma formed from partial melting will always have greater concentrations of LREE than HREE, and individual minerals may be dominated by either HREE or LREE, depending on which range of ionic radii best fits the crystal lattice.

Among the anhydrous rare-earth phosphates, it is the tetragonal mineral xenotime that incorporates yttrium and the HREE, whereas the monoclinic monazite phase incorporates cerium and the LREE preferentially. The smaller size of the HREE allows greater solid solubility in the rock-forming minerals that make up Earth's mantle, and thus yttrium and the HREE show less enrichment in Earth's crust relative to chondritic abundance than does cerium and the LREE.

This has economic consequences: large ore bodies of LREE are known around the world and are being exploited. Ore bodies for HREE are more rare, smaller, and less concentrated. Most of the current supply of HREE originates in the "ion-absorption clay" ores of Southern China. Some versions provide concentrates containing about 65% yttrium oxide, with the HREE being present in ratios reflecting the Oddo–Harkins rule: even-numbered REE at abundances of about 5% each, and odd-numbered REE at abundances of about 1% each. Similar compositions are found in xenotime or gadolinite.

Well-known minerals containing yttrium, and other HREE, include gadolinite, xenotime, samarskite, euxenite, fergusonite, yttrotantalite, yttrotungstite, yttrofluorite (a variety of fluorite), thalenite, and yttrialite. Small amounts occur in zircon, which derives its typical yellow fluorescence from some of the accompanying HREE. The zirconium mineral eudialyte, such as is found in southern Greenland (an autonomous territory of Denmark), contains small but potentially useful amounts of yttrium. Of the above yttrium minerals, most played a part in providing research quantities of lanthanides during the discovery days. Xenotime is occasionally recovered as a byproduct of heavy-sand processing, but is not as abundant as the similarly recovered monazite (which typically contains a few percent of yttrium). Uranium ores from Ontario have occasionally yielded yttrium as a byproduct.

Well-known minerals containing cerium, and other LREE, include bastnäsite, monazite, allanite, loparite, ancylite, parisite, lanthanite, chevkinite, cerite, stillwellite, britholite, fluocerite, and cerianite. Monazite (marine sands from Brazil, India, or Australia; rock from South Africa), bastnäsite (from Mountain Pass rare earth mine, or several localities in China), and loparite (Kola Peninsula, Russia) have been the principal ores of cerium and the light lanthanides.

Enriched deposits of rare-earth elements at the surface of the Earth, carbonatites and pegmatites, are related to alkaline plutonism, an uncommon kind of magmatism that occurs in tectonic settings where there is rifting or that are near subduction zones. In a rift setting, the alkaline magma is produced by very small degrees of partial melting (<1%) of garnet peridotite in the upper mantle (200 to 600 km depth). This melt becomes enriched in incompatible elements, like the rare-earth elements, by leaching them out of the crystalline residue. The resultant magma rises as a diapir, or diatreme, along pre-existing fractures, and can be emplaced deep in the crust, or erupted at the surface.

Typical REE enriched deposits types forming in rift settings are carbonatites, and A- and M-Type granitoids. Near subduction zones, partial melting of the subducting plate within the asthenosphere (80 to 200 km depth) produces a volatile-rich magma (high concentrations of CO_{2} and water), with high concentrations of alkaline elements, and high element mobility that the rare earths are strongly partitioned into. This melt may also rise along pre-existing fractures, and be emplaced in the crust above the subducting slab or erupted at the surface. REE-enriched deposits forming from these melts are typically S-Type granitoids.

Alkaline magmas enriched with rare-earth elements include carbonatites, peralkaline granites (pegmatites), and nepheline syenite. Carbonatites crystallize from CO_{2}-rich fluids, which can be produced by partial melting of hydrous-carbonated lherzolite to produce a CO_{2}-rich primary magma, by fractional crystallization of an alkaline primary magma, or by separation of a CO_{2}-rich immiscible liquid from. These liquids are most commonly forming in association with very deep Precambrian cratons, like the ones found in Africa and the Canadian Shield.

Ferrocarbonatites are the most common type of carbonatite to be enriched in REE, and are often emplaced as late-stage, brecciated pipes at the core of igneous complexes. They consist of fine-grained calcite and hematite, sometimes with significant concentrations of ankerite and minor concentrations of siderite. Large carbonatite deposits enriched in rare-earth elements include Mount Weld in Australia, Thor Lake in Canada, Zandkopsdrift in South Africa, and Mountain Pass in the United States.

Peralkaline granites (A-Type granitoids) have very high concentrations of alkaline elements and very low concentrations of phosphorus; they are deposited at moderate depths in extensional zones, often as igneous ring complexes, or as pipes, massive bodies, and lenses. These fluids have very low viscosities and high element mobility, which allows for the crystallization of large grains, despite a relatively short crystallization time upon emplacement; their large grain size is why these deposits are commonly referred to as pegmatites.

Economically viable pegmatites include Niobium-Yttrium-Fluorine (NYF) types enriched in Yttrium and other rare-earth minerals, with REE-rich deposits found at Strange Lake in Canada and Khaladean-Buregtey in Mongolia. Nepheline syenite (M-Type granitoids) deposits are 90% feldspar and feldspathoid minerals. They are deposited in small, circular massifs and contain high concentrations of rare-earth-bearing accessory minerals. For the most part, these deposits are small but important examples include Illimaussaq-Kvanefeld in Greenland, and Lovozero Massif near Murmansk in Russia.

Rare-earth elements can also be enriched in deposits by secondary alteration either by interactions with hydrothermal fluids or meteoric water or by erosion and transport of resistate REE-bearing minerals. Argillization of primary minerals enriches insoluble elements by leaching out silica and other soluble elements, recrystallizing feldspar into clay minerals such kaolinite, halloysite, and montmorillonite. In tropical regions where precipitation is high, weathering forms a thick argillized regolith, this process is called supergene enrichment and produces laterite deposits. Heavy rare-earth elements are incorporated into the residual clay by absorption. This kind of deposit is only mined for REE in Southern China, where the majority of global heavy rare-earth element production occurs. REE-laterites do form elsewhere, including over the carbonatite at Mount Weld in Australia. REE may also be extracted from placer deposits if the sedimentary parent lithology contains REE-bearing, heavy resistate minerals.

In 2011, Yasuhiro Kato, a geologist at the University of Tokyo who led a study of Pacific Ocean seabed mud, published results indicating the mud could hold rich concentrations of rare-earth minerals, leading to his belief that undersea rare-earth resources are more promising than land-based ones.

== Extraction and production ==
Rare earths production

Rare-earth elements (REEs) are purified from rare-earth oxides (REOs) and mining reserves are quoted in terms of (REO). Terminology deriving from this term includes:

- HREO: collective oxides of the heavy rare-earth elements
- LREO: collective oxides of the light rare-earth elements
- TREO: total rare-earth oxides, the cumulative measurement of both HREOs and LREOs
- CREO: critical rare-earth oxides, a group of oxides defined by the US Department of Energy in December 2011 as "critical" (oxides of Nd, Dy, Eu, Y, and Tb)
- MREO or MagREO: magnetic rare-earth oxides, a group of rare-earth oxides used in the production of neodymium-iron-boron permanent magnets (oxides of Nd, Pr, Dy, and Tb)

=== Production and demand overview ===
Global production 1950–2000.

Because of their geochemical properties, rare-earth elements are typically dispersed and not often found concentrated in rare-earth minerals. Consequently, economically exploitable ore deposits are sparse.

Until 1948, most of the world's rare earths were sourced from placer sand deposits in India and Brazil. In the 1950s, South Africa was the world's rare earth source, from a monazite-rich reef at the Steenkampskraal mine in Western Cape province. From the 1960s until the 1980s, the Mountain Pass Rare Earth Mine in California made the United States the leading producer. In the 1990s, European countries, in particular France, produced a lot of rare earths. After China undercut world prices in the 1990s, many mines in other countries closed, and it takes several years to restart production.

In 2009, future worldwide demand for rare-earth elements was expected to exceed supply by 40,000 metric tons annually unless major new sources are developed. As a result of the increased demand and tightening restrictions on exports of the metals from China, in 2011, some countries were stockpiling rare-earth resources, Searches for alternative sources continued in many other countries. In 2013, it was stated that the demand for REEs would increase due to the dependence of the EU on these elements, the fact that rare-earth elements cannot be substituted by other elements, and because REEs have a low recycling rate. Due to the increased demand and low supply, future prices were expected to increase. Demand continues to increase due to the fact that they are essential for new and innovative technology. These new products that need REEs to be produced are high-technology equipment such as smartphones, digital cameras, computer parts, semiconductors, etc. In addition, these elements are more prevalent in industries such as renewable energy technology, military equipment, glassmaking, and metallurgy. Increased demand has strained supply, and there has been growing concern that the world may soon face a shortage of the rare earths. As of late 2023, the global demand for rare-earth elements (REEs) was expected to increase more than fivefold by 2030.

In 2017, China produced 81% of the world's rare-earth supply, mostly in Inner Mongolia, although it had only 36.7% of global reserves. Australia was the world's second-largest producer, and the only other major actor, with 15% of world production. The Browns Range mine, located 160 km (99 mi) south-east of Halls Creek in northern Western Australia and operational since 2018, came as the first significant dysprosium producer outside of China. As of 2022, all of the world's heavy rare earths (such as dysprosium) were still coming from Chinese rare-earth sources, such as the polymetallic Bayan Obo deposit. In 2023, there were over a hundred ongoing mining projects, many of which outside of China.

As of 2025, 85–90% of global rare-earth mineral refining capacity was in China, which both mines and refines them on a large scale. China is responsible for over half of global mining, and almost 90% of processing, of rare-earths. Around 80% of US rare-earth supply is sourced from China, and the EU imports around 98% of its use from China. The overall global market for rare-earth is approximately 300,000 metric tons annually, about US$5 billion per year.

=== Production by country ===
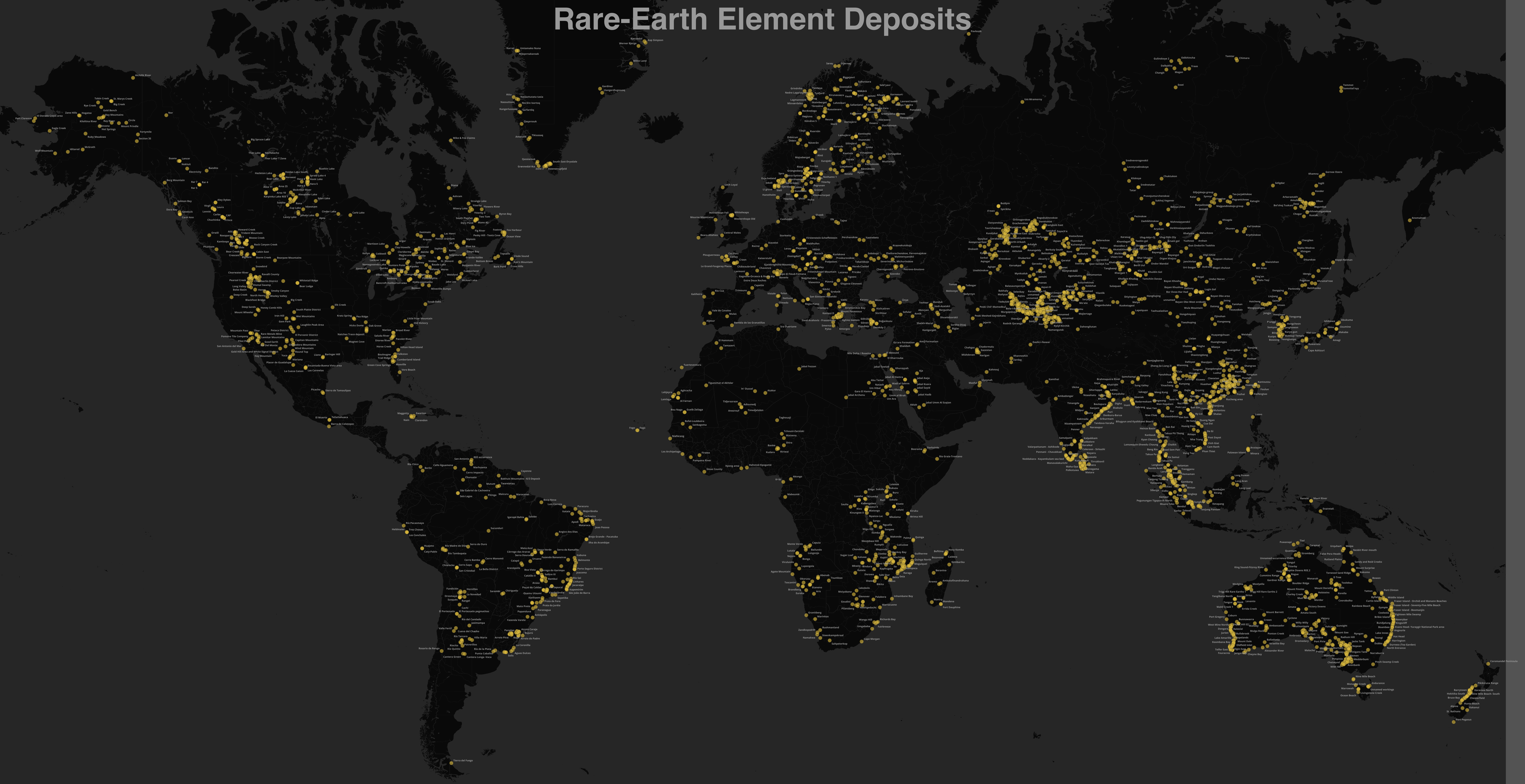
Global rare-earth element deposits

The top eight countries in terms of REE reserves, as per the US Geological Survey's February 2025 report on rare-earth elements, are as follows (in tonnes of rare earth oxide equivalent):

Rank	Country	Reserves (million metric tons)	Reserves per capita (kg)
—	World	130	15.73
1	China	44	31.07
2	Brazil	21	98.39
3	India	6.9	4.87
4	Australia	5.7	202.39
5	Russia	3.8	26.02
6	Vietnam	3.5	34.45
7	USA	1.9	5.47
8	Greenland (Denmark)	1.5	249.90
9	Tanzania	0.9	12.76
10	South Africa	0.9	13.90
11	Canada	0.8	20.40

==== China ====
In 2009 China announced plans to reduce its export quota to 35,000 tons per year in 2010–2015, ostensibly to conserve scarce resources and protect the environment. It also announced regulations on exports and a crackdown on smuggling. It also suspended rare-earth exports to Japan, due to a dispute over territory. The government in Beijing further increased its control by forcing smaller, independent miners to merge into state-owned corporations or face closure. At the end of 2010, China announced that the first round of export quotas in 2011 for rare earths would be 14,446 tons, a 35% decrease from the previous first round of quotas in 2010. It announced further export quotas in July 2011 for the second half of the year, with total allocation at 30,184 tons and total production capped at 93,800 metric tons. In September 2011, China announced the halt in production of three of its eight major rare-earth mines, responsible for almost 40% of China's total rare-earth production.

In March 2012, the US, EU, and Japan confronted China at the World Trade Organization (WTO) about these export and production restrictions. China responded with claims that the restrictions had environmental protection in mind. In August 2012, China announced a further 20% reduction in production. The United States, Japan, and the European Union filed a joint lawsuit with the WTO in 2012 against China, arguing that China should not be able to deny such important exports.

In 2012, in response to the opening of new mines in other countries (Lynas in Australia and Molycorp in the United States), prices of rare earths dropped. The price of dysprosium oxide was US$994/kg in 2011, and dropped to US$265/kg by 2014.

In August 2014, the WTO ruled that China had broken free-trade agreements, and the WTO said in the summary of key findings that "the overall effect of the foreign and domestic restrictions is to encourage domestic extraction and secure preferential use of those materials by Chinese manufacturers." China declared that it would implement the ruling on 26 September 2014, but would need some time to do so. By 5 January 2015, China had lifted all quotas from the export of rare earths, but export licenses were still required.

China shut down some of its own ionic clay mines due to their environmental impact, and started mining heavy rare-earths in Myanmar.

In 2019, China supplied between 85% and 95% of the global demand for the 17 rare-earth powders, much of it sourced from Myanmar. After the 2021 military coup in that country, future supplies of critical ores were possibly constrained.

Between 2020 and 2023, 70% of all rare earth compounds and metals imported into the United States came from China.

As of 2025, China was digging up 70 percent of the global supply of rare-earths, but was also processing around 90 of the world supply, refining not only its own ore, but also nearly all of Myanmar's and Australia's, as well as almost half of American production.

In 2025, during the China–United States trade war, China restricted exports of heavy rare earths to the US. After President Donald Trump imposed high tariffs on American goods being imported by China, in April 2025 China retaliated by imposing restrictions on the sale of seven rare earth minerals to America, and in early October 2025 added further controls.

==== Brazil ====
Brazil has the second-largest reserves of rare-earths in the world, at 23%, but has not produced the metals on a commercial scale until recently. As of June 2025 the Brazilian Government is providing nearly $1 billion in funding through the Brazilian Development Bank and the government funding agency Finep. Brazil is seen as a serious challenger to China's dominance of the market.

In 2025, Serra Verde mining company, which is controlled by American investment fund Denham Capital, began extracting rare-earth minerals near the small city of Minaçu. While initially export the ore to China for processing, the company plans to produce the four rare-earths neodymium, praseodymium, dysprosium, and terbium on a commercial scale, the first outside Asia to do this. Mining of the minerals is done in shallow holes, using only water and salt to process the ores. The Australian company Brazilian Rare Earths has 1,410 km^{2} (540 sq mi) of mining claims are in the state of Bahia. Other companies operating in the sector include Aclara Resources, which is focused on providing MREOs to a magnet production facility in South Carolina, US; the Australian exploration company Viridis Mining and Minerals; Meteoric Resources NL, which is doing exploration and feasibility studies; Ionic Rare Earths Ltd; and Neo Performance Materials Inc. Many of the companies operating in Brazil emphasise their environmentally-friendly ionic-clay-based operations.

==== India ====
India has the third-largest reserves of rare-earths in the world, at 6.9 MT, including almost 35% of the world's sand mineral deposits, and has been stepping up the industry in the face of restrictions by China. The government-owned Indian Rare Earths is a major player. It was reported in parliament in July 2025 that The country has around 7.23 million tonnes (MT) of REOs contained in 13.15 MT monazite, found in coastal, inland, and riverine sands in the states of Andhra Pradesh, Odisha, Tamil Nadu, Kerala, West Bengal, Jharkhand, Gujarat, and Maharashtra, while another 1.29 MT rare earths are held in hard rocks in parts of Gujarat and Rajasthan. The Atomic Minerals Directorate for Exploration and Research is carrying out exploration in all terrains. The Geological Survey of India has been involved in 34 exploration projects. India exported around 18 tonnes of rare earth minerals between 2015 and 2025. However, India is lacking in advanced REE processing technology and skills, especially compared with China, the US, and Japan, so in 2025 the government launched its "National Critical Mineral Mission", with the aim of developing REE self-reliance. With the growing market for EVs and the transition to renewables requiring rare-earths, India has experienced shortages.

The Ministry of Mines has signed bilateral agreements with several governments around the world, including Australia, Argentina, Zambia, Peru, Zimbabwe, Mozambique, Malawi, and Côte d'Ivoire, as well as with the International Energy Agency.

==== Australia ====
In 2011, Australia produced 1,995 tonnes of rare earths. By 2021, it was the fourth largest producer of rare earths in the world, with a total production of 19,958 tonnes. As of August 2025 the largest Australian REE companies in terms of stocks are Lynas Corporation; Iluka Resources; Brazilian Rare Earths (whose 1,410 km^{2} (540 sq mi) of mining claims are in the state of Bahia, Brazil); Arafura Rare Earths; and Northern Minerals, whose main development is in Browns Range, Western Australia. Following the publication of its "Critical Minerals Strategy 2023–2030" in June 2023, in November 2024, the Albanese government announced its "International Partnerships in Critical Minerals" program, which will provide AU$40 million in grants across eight projects.

The government's Critical Minerals Strategic Reserve plan is due for publication at the end of 2026. The intention of this plan is to introduce mechanisms such as a price floor that bring stability to the market and reduce price volatility.

On 21 October 2025, the Prime Minister of Australia, Anthony Albanese, signed a deal with the President of the United States, Donald Trump, over rare-earths and other critical minerals that are needed for commercial clean energy production and technologically advanced military hardware. They each committed to provide at least US$1bn (A$1.54bn) towards a number of projects worth $US8.5bn (A$13bn) in both countries over six months. The full framework between the two countries has been published on the Australian Department of Industry, Science and Resources website.

==== Vietnam ====
Vietnam signed an agreement in October 2010 to supply Japan with rare earths, from its northwestern Lai Châu Province. but the deal was never realized due to disagreements. One of the deposits is Mau Xe North.

==== United States ====
The largest rare-earth deposit in the United States is at Mountain Pass, California, sixty miles south of Las Vegas. Originally opened by Molycorp, the deposit has been mined, off and on, since 1951.

A second large deposit of REEs at Elk Creek in southeast Nebraska has been under consideration by NioCorp Development Ltd who hopes to open a niobium, scandium, and titanium mine there. That mine may be able to produce as much as 7,200 metric tons of ferro niobium and 95 metric tons of scandium trioxide annually. As of 2022, financing is still in the works.

As of 2006, the Bokan Mountain project in Alaska was being developed. The Bokan-Dotson Ridge project, the location of a significant deposit of REE, was the subject of a Preliminary Economic Assessment released in January 2013, and was reported by the Alaska Department of Natural Resources to be in an "advanced exploration phase" by Ucore Rare Metals in 2025. However it has no operational capacity.

In 2024 American Rare Earths Inc. disclosed that its reserves near Wheatland Wyoming totaled 2.34 billion metric tons, possibly the world's largest, and larger than a separate 1.2 million metric ton deposit in northeastern Wyoming.

After China had announced new restrictions on access to their rare-earths in 2025, the U.S. has been seeking alternative supply chains. On 20 October 2025, President Trump signed a deal with the Prime Minister of Australia, Anthony Albanese, over rare-earths and other critical minerals that are needed for commercial sustainable energy production and technologically advanced military hardware. They each committed to provide at least US$1bn (A$1.54bn) towards a number of projects worth $US8.5bn (A$13bn) in both the US and Australian projects over six months.

==== Greenland ====
In 2010, a large deposit of rare-earth minerals was discovered in Kvanefjeld in southern Greenland, which is an autonomous territory of Denmark. Pre-feasibility drilling at this site has confirmed significant quantities of black lujavrite, which contains about 1% rare-earth oxides (REO). The European Union has urged Greenland to restrict Chinese development of rare-earth projects there, but as of early 2013, the government of Greenland has said that it has no plans to impose such restrictions. Many Danish politicians have expressed concerns that other nations, including China, could gain influence in thinly populated Greenland, given the number of foreign workers and investment that could come from Chinese companies in the near future because of the law passed December 2012.

==== Tanzania ====
Adding to potential mine sites, Australian Securities Exchange listed Peak Resources announced in February 2012, that their Tanzanian-based Ngualla project contained not only the 6th largest deposit by tonnage outside of China but also the highest grade of rare-earth elements of the 6.

==== South Africa ====
Significant sites under development include Steenkampskraal in South Africa, the world's highest grade rare-earths and thorium mine, closed in 1963, but has been gearing to go back into production. The mine is considered to have the highest-grade ore of monazite in the world, at 50% Total Rare Earth Oxides (TREO). In September 2025 the Industrial Development Corporation (IDC) of South Africa released funding for Phase 1: Metallurgical Implementation. The mine is expected to have a mine life of around 28 years.

==== Canada ====
As of 2006, the remote Hoidas Lake project in northern Canada was being developed. It was estimated that this project has the potential to supply about 10% of the $1 billion of REE consumption that occurs in North America every year.Under consideration for mining are sites such as Thor Lake in the Northwest Territories.

==== Other countries ====
===== European Union =====
As of 2025, rare earth elements mining is absent in the European Union, with only one operational processing facility owned by the Canadian company Neo Performance Materials. Although REE deposits exist within the EU and European mining companies have begun developing new mines, the permitting processes remain lengthy and financially demanding. The EU member states import practically all of their rare earth elements from China. The European Union Parliament considers this a strategic risk.

===== Japan =====
In May 2012, researchers from two universities in Japan announced that they had discovered rare earths in Ehime Prefecture, Japan.

===== Madagascar =====
A licence to mine rare-earths has been granted to an area covering around a third of the Ampasindava Peninsula on the north-western coast of Madagascar, after a number of exploration-only permits had been issued since 2003. As of 2025, the licence is held by the Australian company Harena Resources, after changing hands several times. It has been determined that the site contains a defined mineral resource of 699 million tonnes at 868 ppm Total Rare Earth Oxides (TREO), which, according to Harena, makes it one of the largest rare earth deposits in the world.

===== Malaysia =====
In early 2011, Australian mining company Lynas was reported to be "hurrying to finish" a US$230 million rare-earth refinery on the eastern coast of Peninsular Malaysia's industrial port of Kuantan, which would refine ore — lanthanides concentrate from the Mount Weld mine in Australia. It was forecast that the refinery would meet nearly a third of the world's demand for rare-earth materials, excluding China. The Kuantan development brought renewed attention to the Malaysian town of Bukit Merah in Perak, where a rare-earth mine operated by a Mitsubishi Chemical subsidiary, Asian Rare Earth, closed in 1994 and left continuing environmental and health concerns. In mid-2011, after protests, Malaysian government restrictions on the Lynas plant were announced. An independent review initiated by the Malaysian Government, and conducted by the International Atomic Energy Agency (IAEA) in 2011 to address concerns of radioactive hazards, found that it was compliant with international radiation safety standards. After several delays, in September 2014 Lynas was issued a two-year full operating stage license by the AELB.

In November 2024, economy minister Rafizi Ramli said he hoped Malaysia would be able to produce rare-earth elements within three years, through discussions with China to provide technology. There was some concern in the community about plans to mine rare-earth elements at Kedah, as the mines could destroy forest reserves and harm water catchment areas.

===== Myanmar =====
Rare earths were discovered near Pang War in Chipwi Township along the China–Myanmar border in the late 2010s.

China is known to import rare earths from Myanmar (see above). In 2021, China imported US$200 million of rare earths from Myanmar, exceeding 20,000 metric tons, mostly from Kachin State, after shutting down its own domestic mines due to the detrimental environmental impact. Chinese companies and miners are said to illegally set up operations in Kachin State without government permits, and instead circumvent the central government by working with a Border Guard Force militia under the Tatmadaw, formerly known as the New Democratic Army – Kachin, which has profited from this extractive industry.

As of March 2022, there were 2,700 mining collection pools scattered across 300 separate locations found in Kachin State, encompassing the area of Singapore, an exponential increase from 2016. Land has also been seized from locals to conduct mining operations.

===== North Korea =====
North Korea has been reported to have exported rare-earth ore to China, about US$1.88 million worth during May and June 2014.

===== Norway =====
In June 2024, Rare Earths Norway (REN) found a rare-earth oxide deposit of 8.8 million metric tons in Telemark, Norway, making it Europe's largest known rare-earth element deposit. The mining firm predicted that it would finish developing the first stage of mining in 2030.

===== Spain =====
In central Spain, Ciudad Real Province, the proposed rare-earth mining project 'Matamulas' may provide, according to its developers, up to 2,100 Tn/year (33% of the annual UE demand). However, this project has been suspended by regional authorities due to social and environmental concerns.

===== Sweden =====
In January 2023, Swedish state-owned mining company LKAB announced that it had discovered a deposit of over 1 million metric tons of rare earths in the country's Kiruna area, which would make it the largest such deposit in Europe.

===== Turkey =====
In Eskişehir’s Beylikova district, exploration revealed 694 million tons of complex ore containing REEs along with barite, fluorite and thorium.

===== Ukraine =====
Ukraine holds significant rare earth deposits, which have been at the center of the 2022 Russian invasion of Ukraine and peace negotiations.

===== United Kingdom =====
In the United Kingdom, Pensana has begun construction of their US$195 million rare-earth processing plant which secured funding from the UK government's Automotive Transformation Fund. The plant will process ore from the Longonjo mine in Angola and other sources as they become available. The company are targeting production in late 2023, before ramping up to full capacity in 2024. Pensana aim to produce 12,500 metric tons of separated rare earths, including 4,500 metric tons of magnet metal rare earths.

=== Non-mining REE sources ===
==== Mine tailings ====
Significant quantities of rare-earth oxides are found in tailings accumulated from 50 years of uranium ore, shale, and loparite mining at Sillamäe, Estonia. Due to the rising prices of rare earths, extraction of these oxides has become economically viable. The country currently exports around 3,000 metric tons per year, representing around 2% of world production. Similar resources are suspected in the western United States, where gold rush-era mines are believed to have discarded large amounts of rare earths, because they had no value at the time. Mining tailings have been found to increase REE enrichment in local soil and water, posing risks to environmental and human health.

==== Ocean mining ====
In January 2013 a Japanese deep-sea research vessel obtained seven deep-sea mud core samples from the Pacific Ocean seafloor at 5,600 to 5,800 meters depth, approximately 250 kilometres (160 mi) south of the island of Minami-Tori-Shima. The research team found a mud layer 2 to 4 meters beneath the seabed with concentrations of up to 0.66% rare-earth oxides. A potential deposit might compare in grade with the ion-absorption-type deposits in southern China that provide the bulk of Chinese REO mine production, which grade in the range of 0.05% to 0.5% REO.

==== Waste and recycling ====
Another recently developed source of rare earths is electronic waste and other wastes that have significant rare-earth components. Advances in recycling technology have made the extraction of rare earths from these materials less expensive. Recycling plants operate in Japan, where an estimated 300,000 tons of rare earths are found in unused electronics. In France, the Rhodia group is setting up two factories, in La Rochelle and Saint-Fons, that will produce 200 tons of rare earths a year from used fluorescent lamps, magnets, and batteries. Coal and coal by-products, such as ash and sludge, are a potential source of critical elements including rare-earth elements (REE) with estimated amounts in the range of 50 million metric tons.

== Uses ==
=== Global consumption ===
Global REE consumption, 2015.
1. Catalysts, 24% (24.0%)
2. Magnets, 23% (23.0%)
3. Polishing, 12% (12.0%)
4. "other", 9% (9.00%)
5. Metallurgy, 8% (8.00%)
6. Batteries, 8% (8.00%)
7. Glass, 7% (7.00%)
8. Ceramics, 6% (6.00%)
9. Phosphors and pigments, 3% (3.00%)
US consumption of REE, 2018.
1. Catalysts, 60% (60.0%)
2. Ceramics and glass, 15% (15.0%)
3. Polishing, 10% (10.0%)
4. "other", 5% (5.00%)
5. Metallurgy, 10% (10.0%)

The uses, applications, and demand for rare-earth elements have expanded over the years. Globally, most REEs were being used for catalysts and magnets in 2015. In the US, more than half of REEs are used for catalysts; ceramics, glass, and polishing are also main uses. The global move towards renewable energy technologies, along with advanced electronics and new applications in defence applications has caused increased demand for REEs.

=== Catalysts ===
Lanthanum chloride is used in fluid catalytic cracking for the production of gasoline and diesel. Cerium(III) oxide is used in catalytic converters.

=== Magnets ===
According to Lucas et al., "Rare earth metal-transition metal alloy magnets are the strongest in the world. The strong magnetic fields exerted by these materials allow miniaturization of electric motors and generators, because tiny rare earth magnets exert strong forces. Neodymium-iron-boron magnets are the strongest at ambient temperatures." However, at temperatures above 150 °C, Samarium-cobalt magnets are stronger. NdFeB and SmCo magnets are ten and six times stronger than standard ferrite magnets. Also, Nd and Sm are less expensive than other rare earth elements, making their use more economical. "Among the most important applications are magnetos, alternators, and power generators. Each power generator uses several tons of NdFeB permanent magnet in the hub at the top of the windmill. NdFeB magnets are used in industrial motors, car motors, electric bicycle motors as well as in the small sophisticated motors driving the hard disks of our computers." RE magnets are also used in Magnetic resonance imaging and Ion beam lithography.

=== Renewables ===
Dysprosium, neodymium, praseodymium, and terbium are key materials for current renewable energy technologies, particularly in electric vehicles (EVs) and wind turbines. EVs use around 1–2 kg (2.2–4.4 lb) of neodymium and praseodymium per vehicle, while wind turbines use up to 600 kg (1,300 lb) of REEs in permanent magnet generators. Although REEs are not required for wind turbine construction, the majority of offshore installations use permanent magnets that require Dy, Nd, Pr and Tb. Under 10% of global dysprosium and neodymium demand is attributed to renewable energy sectors, but for the rarer praseodymium and terbium elements clean energy claims over 30%. There is variability among models of renewable energy growth because of a lack of past data on these relatively new markets. In simulations that have been designed to account for decarbonization goals as expressed in international agreements, projections indicate REEs demand will increase beyond anticipated increases in supply. This has spurred a push for more efficient re-use and recycling processes.

=== Iron and glass production and polishing ===
Rare earth metals are used in magnesium alloys, cast iron, and ductile cast irons. Ceria is a key abrasive for fine glass polishing and chemical mechanical planarization.

=== Luminescence ===
Luminescence applications take advantage of the unpaired 4f electrons emission of a photon after being excited from their fundamental state. According to Lucas et al., "The rare earth elements are widely used in applications where light emission is a criterion of performance." Phosphor lighting devices and displays include "trichromatic lamps (or energy-saving lamps), where lanthanum, yttrium, cerium, terbium, and europium are mainly used to control the color, Light-emitting diodes (LEDs), using mainly yttrium, cerium, and europium, plasma displays, old cathode-ray tubes (CRTs), and liquid crystal displays (LCDs) with fluorescent backlighting, consuming lanthanum, yttrium, cerium, terbium, and europium." Eu^{3+} is the most common red emitter dopant, varying from orange (585 nm with a YBO_{3} host matrix) to deep red (627 nm with a Y_{2}O_{2}S host matrix). Eu^{2+} is the most common blue emitter, as a dopant for BAM BaMgAl_{10}O_{17} in fluorescent lighting and plasma displays. Ce^{3+} exhibits the same behavior, plus Lu_{2}SiO_{5}:Ce^{3+} monocrystals are used in Positron emission tomography. Tb^{3+} is the most common green emitter with a peak at 542 nm. Nd^{3+}, Yb^{3+} and Er^{3+} are used in laser and optical amplifier devices.

=== Alloy production, for electronics and other uses ===
Ce, La, and Nd are important in alloy-making, and in the production of fuel cells and nickel-metal hydride batteries. Ce, Ga, and Nd are important in electronics and are used in the production of LCD and plasma screens, fiber optics, and lasers, and in medical imaging. Additional uses for rare-earth elements are as tracers in medical applications, fertilizers, and in water treatment.Consumer electronics boost demand, with items such as smartphones absorbing 8% of global REE consumption.

=== Defense ===
REEs also have applications in defense, such as with precision-guided systems, which require special compounds of REEs. The strength of neodynium magnets can be used in missile guidance systems. For high-end camera lenses used for intelligence, lanthanum enhances the clarity of the glass.

=== Geology ===
The application of rare-earth elements to geology is important to understanding the petrological processes of igneous, sedimentary and metamorphic rock formation. In geochemistry, rare-earth elements can be used to infer the petrological mechanisms that have affected a rock due to the subtle atomic size differences between the elements, which causes preferential fractionation of some rare earths relative to others depending on the processes at work.

The geochemical study of the REE is not carried out on absolute concentrations – as it is usually done with other chemical elements – but on normalized concentrations in order to observe their serial behaviour. In geochemistry, rare-earth elements are typically presented in normalized "spider" diagrams, in which concentration of rare-earth elements are normalized to a reference standard and are then expressed as the logarithm to the base 10 of the value.

Commonly, the rare-earth elements are normalized to chondritic meteorites, as these are believed to be the closest representation of unfractionated Solar System material. However, other normalizing standards can be applied depending on the purpose of the study. Normalization to a standard reference value, especially of a material believed to be unfractionated, allows the observed abundances to be compared to the initial abundances of the element. Normalization also removes the pronounced 'zig-zag' pattern caused by the differences in abundance between even and odd atomic numbers. Normalization is carried out by dividing the analytical concentrations of each element of the series by the concentration of the same element in a given standard, according to the equation:

$$[\text{REE}_i]_n = \frac{[\text{REE}_i]_\text{sam}}{[\text{REE}_i]_\text{std}}$$

where n indicates the normalized concentration, ${[\text{REE}_i]_\text{sam}}$ the analytical concentration of the element measured in the sample, and ${[\text{REE}_i]_\text{ref}}$ the concentration of the same element in the reference material.

It is possible to observe the serial trend of the REE by reporting their normalized concentrations against the atomic number. The trends that are observed in "spider" diagrams are typically referred to as "patterns", which may be diagnostic of petrological processes that have affected the material of interest.

According to the general shape of the patterns or thanks to the presence (or absence) of so-called "anomalies", information regarding the system under examination and the occurring geochemical processes can be obtained. The anomalies represent enrichment (positive anomalies) or depletion (negative anomalies) of specific elements along the series and are graphically recognizable as positive or negative "peaks" along the REE patterns. The anomalies can be numerically quantified as the ratio between the normalized concentration of the element showing the anomaly and the predictable one based on the average of the normalized concentrations of the two elements in the previous and next position in the series, according to the equation:

$$\frac{\text{REE}_i}{\text{REE}_i^*} = \frac{[\text{REE}_i]_n \times 2}{[\text{REE}_{i-1}]_n + [\text{REE}_{i+1}]_n}$$

where $[\text{REE}_i]_n$ is the normalized concentration of the element whose anomaly has to be calculated, $[\text{REE}_{i-1}]_n$ and $[\text{REE}_{i+1}]_n$ the normalized concentrations of the respectively previous and next elements along the series.

The rare-earth elements patterns observed in igneous rocks are primarily a function of the chemistry of the source where the rock came from, as well as the fractionation history the rock has undergone. Fractionation is in turn a function of the partition coefficients of each element. Partition coefficients are responsible for the fractionation of trace elements (including rare-earth elements) into the liquid phase (the melt/magma) into the solid phase (the mineral). If an element preferentially remains in the solid phase it is termed 'compatible', and if it preferentially partitions into the melt phase it is described as 'incompatible'. Each element has a different partition coefficient, and therefore fractionates into solid and liquid phases distinctly. These concepts are also applicable to metamorphic and sedimentary petrology.

In igneous rocks, particularly in felsic melts, the following observations apply: anomalies in europium are dominated by the crystallization of feldspars. Hornblende, controls the enrichment of MREE compared to LREE and HREE. Depletion of LREE relative to HREE may be due to the crystallization of olivine, orthopyroxene, and clinopyroxene. On the other hand, the depletion of HREE relative to LREE may be due to the presence of garnet, as garnet preferentially incorporates HREE into its crystal structure. The presence of zircon may also cause a similar effect.

In sedimentary rocks, rare-earth elements in clastic sediments are a representation of provenance. The rare-earth element concentrations are not typically affected by sea and river waters, as rare-earth elements are insoluble and thus have very low concentrations in these fluids. As a result, when sediment is transported, rare-earth element concentrations are unaffected by the fluid and instead the rock retains the rare-earth element concentration from its source.

Sea and river waters typically have low rare-earth element concentrations. However, aqueous geochemistry is still very important. In oceans, rare-earth elements reflect input from rivers, hydrothermal vents, and aeolian sources; this is important in the investigation of ocean mixing and circulation.

Rare-earth elements are also useful for dating rocks, as some radioactive isotopes display long half-lives. Of particular interest are the ^{138}La-^{138}Ce, ^{147}Sm-^{143}Nd, and ^{176}Lu-^{176}Hf systems.

=== Agriculture ===
REEs have been used in agriculture to increase plant growth, productivity, and stress resistance. REEs can be used in agriculture through REE-enriched fertilizers, which was a widely used practice in China in 2002. REEs are feed additives for livestock which has resulted in increased production such as larger animals and a higher production of eggs and dairy products. This practice has resulted in REE bioaccumulation within livestock and has impacted vegetation and algae growth in these agricultural areas. Bioaccumulation was observed in roots of maize treated with REE fertilizer after 10 days. Negative effects on maize biomass were observed at high REE concentrations. While no ill effects have been observed at current low concentrations, the effects over the long-term and with accumulation over time are unknown, prompting some calls for more research into their possible effects.

== Issues ==
=== Geopolitical issues ===
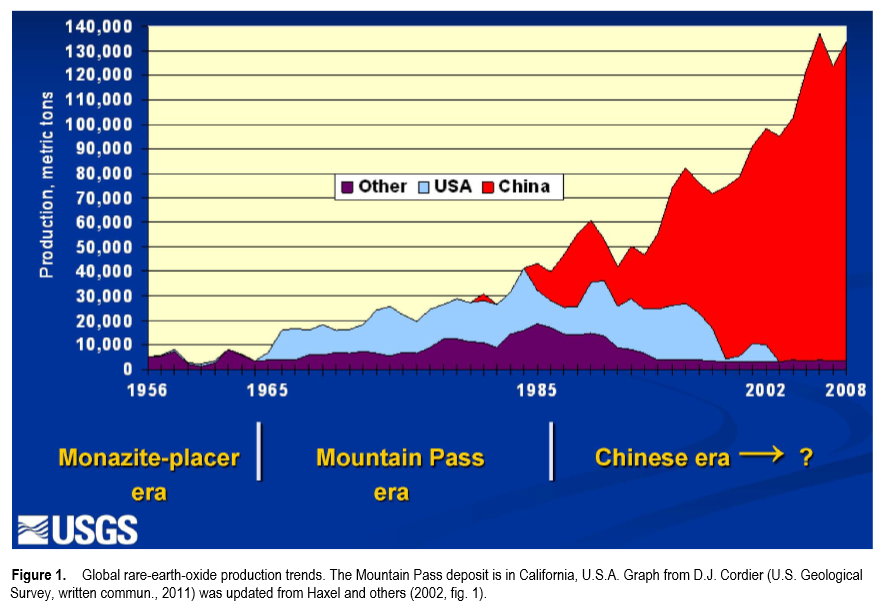
Global rare-earth-oxide production trends, 1956-2008 (USGS).

==== Import reliance ====
The United States Department of Energy in its 2010 Critical Materials Strategy report identified dysprosium as the element that was most critical in terms of import reliance.

==== Dominance of China ====
China currently has an effective monopoly on the world's REE Value Chain. (All of the refineries and processing plants that transform the raw ore into valuable elements). In the words of Deng Xiaoping, a Chinese politician from the late 1970s to the late 1980s, "The Middle East has oil; we have rare earths ... it is of extremely important strategic significance; we must be sure to handle the rare earth issue properly and make the fullest use of our country's advantage in rare-earth resources." One possible example of market control is the division of General Motors that deals with miniaturized magnet research, which shut down its US office and moved its entire staff to China in 2006. China's export quota only applies to the metal but not products made from these metals such as magnets.

It was reported, but officially denied, that China instituted an export ban on shipments of rare-earth oxides, but not alloys, to Japan on 22 September 2010, in response to the detainment of a Chinese fishing boat captain by the Japanese Coast Guard. On September 2, 2010, a few days before the fishing boat incident, The Economist reported that "China ... in July announced the latest in a series of annual export reductions, this time by 40% to precisely 30,258 tonnes." China has officially cited resource depletion and environmental concerns as the reasons for a nationwide crackdown on its rare-earth mineral production sector. Non-environmental motives have also been imputed to China's rare-earth policy. In 2010, according to The Economist, "Slashing their exports of rare-earth metals ... is all about moving Chinese manufacturers up the supply chain, so they can sell valuable finished goods to the world rather than lowly raw materials."

A 2011 report "China's Rare-Earth Industry", issued by the US Geological Survey and US Department of the Interior, outlines industry trends within China and examines national policies that may guide the future of the country's production. The report notes that China's lead in the production of rare-earth minerals has accelerated over the past two decades. In 1990, China accounted for only 27% of such minerals. In 2009, world production was 132,000 metric tons; China produced 129,000 of those tons. According to the report, recent patterns suggest that China will slow the export of such materials to the world: "Owing to the increase in domestic demand, the Government has gradually reduced the export quota during the past several years."

In 2006, China allowed 47 domestic rare-earth producers and traders and 12 Sino-foreign rare-earth producers to export. Controls have since tightened annually; by 2011, only 22 domestic rare-earth producers and traders and 9 Sino-foreign rare-earth producers were authorized. The government's future policies will likely keep in place strict controls: "According to China's draft rare-earth development plan, annual rare-earth production may be limited to between 130,000 and 140,000 [metric tons] during the period from 2009 to 2015. The export quota for rare-earth products may be about 35,000 [metric tons] and the Government may allow 20 domestic rare-earth producers and traders to export rare earths."

Much of the modern global resources of heavy rare earths are being sourced from China's ionic clay deposits. A 2025 analysis by Benchmark Mineral Intelligence suggests the West will still be dependent on China for 91% of their heavy rare earths needs by 2030, which is modestly less than 99% in 2024. Between 2014 and 2024, China accounted for 81% of rare-earth-related technology patent filings.

=== Mining in the United States ===
The US Bureau of Mines was closed in 1996, which dramatically slowed domestic rare earth mining and research.

==== Import source diversification ====
The United States Geological Survey was actively surveying southern Afghanistan for rare-earth deposits under the protection of United States military forces. Since 2009 the USGS has conducted remote sensing surveys as well as fieldwork to verify Soviet claims that volcanic rocks containing rare-earth metals exist in Helmand Province near the village of Khanashin. The USGS study team has located a sizable area of rocks in the center of an extinct volcano containing light rare-earth elements including cerium and neodymium. It has mapped 1.3 million metric tons of desirable rock, or about ten years of supply at current demand levels. The Pentagon has estimated its value at about $7.4 billion.It has been argued that the geopolitical importance of rare earths has been exaggerated in the literature on the geopolitics of renewable energy, underestimating the power of economic incentives for expanded production. This especially concerns neodymium. Due to its role in permanent magnets used for wind turbines, it has been argued that neodymium will be one of the main objects of geopolitical competition in a world running on renewable energy. But this perspective has been criticized for failing to recognize that most wind turbines have gears and do not use permanent magnets.

=== Environmental issues ===
REEs are naturally found in very low concentrations in the environment. Improperly regulated mining can lead to human rights violations, deforestation, and contamination of land and water. Generally, it is estimated that extracting 1 metric ton of rare earth element creates around 2,000 metric tons of waste, partly toxic, including 1 ton of radioactive waste. The largest mining site of REEs, Bayan Obo in China produced more than 70,000 tons of radioactive waste, that contaminated ground water.

Near mining and industrial sites, the concentrations of REEs can rise to many times the normal background levels. Once in the environment, REEs can leach into the soil where their transport is determined by numerous factors such as erosion, weathering, pH, precipitation, groundwater, etc. Acting much like metals, they can speciate depending on the soil condition being either motile or adsorbed to soil particles. Depending on their bio-availability, REEs can be absorbed into plants and later consumed by humans and animals.

The mining of REEs, use of REE-enriched fertilizers, and the production of phosphorus fertilizers all contribute to REE contamination. Strong acids are used during the extraction process of REEs, which can then leach out into the environment and be transported through water bodies and result in the acidification of aquatic environments. Another additive of REE mining that contributes to REE environmental contamination is cerium oxide (CeO_{2}), which is produced during the combustion of diesel and released as exhaust, contributing heavily to soil and water contamination.

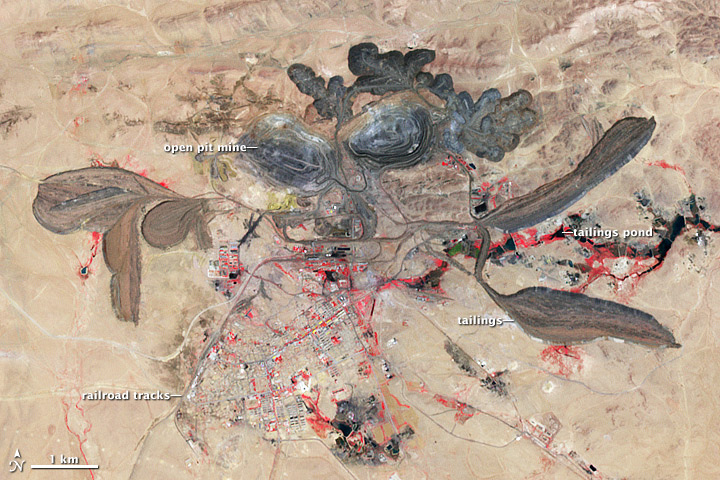
A false-color satellite image of the Bayan Obo Mining District, 2006

Mining, refining, and recycling of rare earths have serious environmental consequences if not properly managed. Low-level radioactive tailings resulting from the occurrence of thorium and uranium in rare-earth ores present a potential hazard and improper handling of these substances can result in extensive environmental damage. In May 2010, China announced a major, five-month crackdown on illegal mining in order to protect the environment and its resources. This campaign is expected to be concentrated in the South, where mines – commonly small, rural, and illegal operations – are particularly prone to releasing toxic waste into the general water supply.

The major operation in Baotou, in Inner Mongolia, where much of the world's rare-earth supply is refined, has caused major environmental damage. China's Ministry of Industry and Information Technology estimated that cleanup costs in Jiangxi province at $5.5 billion.

It is possible to filter out and recover any rare-earth elements that flow out with the wastewater from mining facilities. Such filtering and recovery equipment may not always be present on the outlets carrying the wastewater.

==== Complications of recycling and reusing REEs ====
Despite the fact that e-waste contains a significant amount of rare-earth elements (REE), only 12.5% of e-waste is currently being recycled for all metals. Main concerns about REE recycling and reuse include environmental pollution during REE recycling and increasing recycling efficiency. Literature published in 2004 suggests that, along with previously established pollution mitigation, a more circular supply chain would help mitigate some of the pollution at the extraction point. This means recycling and reusing REEs that are already in use or reaching the end of their life cycle. A study published in 2014 suggests a method to recycle REEs from waste nickel-metal hydride batteries, demonstrating a recovery rate of 95.16%.

Rare-earth elements could also be recovered from industrial wastes with practical potential to reduce environmental and health impacts from mining, waste generation, and imports if known and experimental processes are scaled up. A green system for recovery of REEs from coal fly ash has been developed using citrate and oxalate with strong organic ligands capable of precipitating REEs. A 2019 study suggests that "fulfillment of the circular economy approach could reduce up to 200 times the impact in the climate change category and up to 70 times the cost due to the REE mining." In 2020, in most of the reported studies reviewed by a scientific review, "secondary waste is subjected to chemical and or bioleaching followed by solvent extraction processes for clean separation of REEs."

==== Impact of REE contamination ====
REEs are identified as emerging contaminants under the Environmental Protection Agency's definition "for which a lack of published health standards exist poses a perceived, potential, or real threat to the human health or the environment." There is a sharply increasing number of publications on REE toxicity on plants, animals, and humans in recent years, helping to expand understanding of the complete effects of REEs on health. The extent of their effects is not fully known.

===== On vegetation =====
The mining of REEs has caused the contamination of soil and water around production areas, which has impacted vegetation in these areas by decreasing chlorophyll production, which affects photosynthesis and inhibits the growth of the plants. However, the impact of REE contamination on vegetation is dependent on the plants present in the contaminated environment: not all plants retain and absorb REEs. Also, the ability of the vegetation to intake the REE is dependent on the type of REE present in the soil, hence there are a multitude of factors that influence this process. Agricultural plants are the main type of vegetation affected by REE contamination in the environment, with plants like apples and beets having a higher chance of absorbing and storing REEs.

There is a possibility that REEs can leach out into aquatic environments and be absorbed by aquatic vegetation, which can then bio-accumulate and potentially enter the human food chain if livestock or humans choose to eat the vegetation. An example of this situation was the case of the water hyacinth (Eichhornia crassipes) in China, where the water was contaminated due to a REE-enriched fertilizer being used in a nearby agricultural area. The aquatic environment became contaminated with cerium and resulted in the water hyacinth becoming three times more concentrated in cerium than its surrounding water.

===== On human health =====
The chemical properties of the REEs are so similar that they are expected to show similar toxicity in humans. Mortality studies show REEs are not highly toxic. In cases of occupational exposure, long term (18 months) inhalation of dust containing high levels (60%) of REEs has been shown to cause pneumoconiosis but the mechanism is unknown.Use of REEs like Gandium in medical applications have been linked to issues in childhood development, reproductive health, and kidney health.

The increase application of REEs in new technologies has increased the need to understand their safe levels of exposure for humans. One side effect of mining REEs can be exposure to harmful radioactive Thorium as has been demonstrated at large mine in Batou (Mongolia). The rare-earth mining and smelting process can release airborne fluoride which will associate with total suspended particles (TSP) to form aerosols that can enter human respiratory systems. Research from Baotou, China shows that the fluoride concentration in the air near REE mines is higher than the limit value from WHO, but the health effects of this exposure are unknown.

Analysis of people living near mines in China had many times the levels of REEs in their blood, urine, bone, and hair compared to controls far from mining sites, suggesting possible bioaccumulation of REEs. The elevated presence of REEs was related to the high concentrations in the vegetables the people cultivated, the soil, and the water from the wells caused by the nearby mine.However the levels found were not high enough to cause health effects. Studies indicate potential danger to human and animal health when REE levels exceed accepted background levels in the environment. Affected areas can include the brain, reproductive organs, and gene expression, among others.

===== On animal health =====
Experiments exposing rats to various cerium compounds have found accumulation primarily in the lungs and liver. This resulted in various negative health outcomes associated with those organs. Lathanum, Cerium, and Neodymium fumes have been shown to be cytotoxic, causing damage to DNA in rats. REEs have been added to feed in livestock to increase their body mass and increase milk production with better results than inorganic livestock feed enhancers. It was also discovered that REEs increase the nutrient use of pigs' digestive systems. Studies point to a dose-response when considering toxicity versus positive effects. While small doses from the environment or with proper administration seem to have no ill effects, larger doses have been shown to have negative effects specifically in the organs where they accumulate.

Studies done on REE accumulation in marine animals have found negative effects on DNA and reproduction processes in zebrafish and sea urchins. Biomagnification has been observed in seals. REE pollution from MRI waste in coastal waters has spurred calls for more research on effects on marine ecosystems.

The process of mining REEs in China has resulted in soil and water contamination in certain areas, which when transported into aquatic bodies could potentially bio-accumulate within aquatic biota. In some cases, animals that live in REE-contaminated areas have been diagnosed with organ or system problems. REEs have been used in freshwater fish farming because they have been found to decrease the risk of disease.

==== Remediation after pollution ====
After the 1982 Bukit Merah radioactive pollution, the mine in Malaysia has been the focus of a US$100 million cleanup that is proceeding in 2011. After having accomplished the hilltop entombment of 11,000 truckloads of radioactively contaminated material, the project is expected to entail in summer, 2011, the removal of "more than 80,000 steel barrels of radioactive waste to the hilltop repository."

In May 2011, after the Fukushima nuclear disaster, widespread protests took place in Kuantan over the Lynas refinery and radioactive waste from it. The ore to be processed has very low levels of thorium, and Lynas founder and chief executive Nicholas Curtis said "There is absolutely no risk to public health." T. Jayabalan, a doctor who says he has been monitoring and treating patients affected by the Mitsubishi plant, "is wary of Lynas's assurances. The argument that low levels of thorium in the ore make it safer doesn't make sense, he says, because radiation exposure is cumulative." Construction of the facility has been halted until an independent United Nations IAEA panel investigation is completed, which is expected by the end of June 2011. New restrictions were announced by the Malaysian government in late June.

An IAEA panel investigation was completed and no construction has been halted. Lynas is on budget and on schedule to start producing in 2011. The IAEA concluded in a report issued in June 2011 that it did not find any instance of "any non-compliance with international radiation safety standards" in the project.

If the proper safety standards are followed, REE mining is relatively low impact. Molycorp (before going bankrupt) often exceeded environmental regulations to improve its public image.In Greenland, there is a significant dispute on whether to start a new rare-earth mine in Kvanefjeld due to environmental concerns.

== In popular culture ==
The plot of Eric Ambler's now-classic 1967 international crime-thriller Dirty Story, aka This Gun for Hire, not to be confused with the 1942 movie This Gun for Hire, features a struggle between two rival mining cartels to control a plot of land in a fictional African country, which contains rich minable rare-earth ore deposits.

== See also ==
- List of elements facing shortage
- Material passport: lists used materials in products
- Mineral separation plant
- Pensana Salt End
- Precious metal
- Quad Critical Minerals Initiative Framework
