= Didymium =

Mixture of praseodymium and neodymium

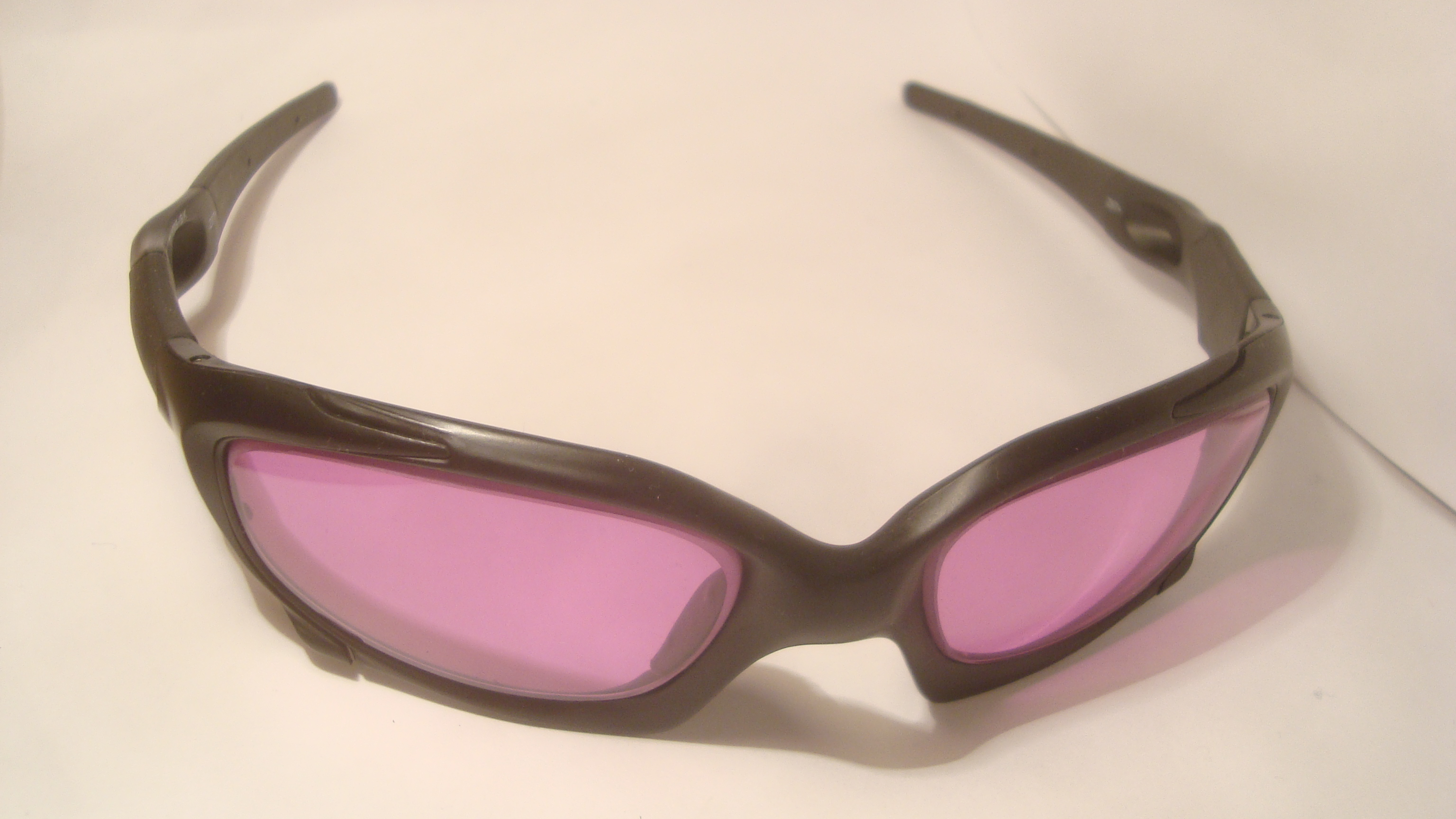
Didymium glasses

Didymium (Greek: δίδυμο, romanized: dídymo, twin) is a mixture of the elements praseodymium and neodymium. It is used in safety glasses for glassblowing and blacksmithing and filter lenses for flame testing, especially with a gas (propane)-powered forge, where it provides a filter that selectively blocks the yellowish light at 589 nm emitted by the hot sodium in the glass without having a detrimental effect on general vision, unlike dark welder's glasses and cobalt glasses. The usefulness of didymium glass for eye protection of this sort was discovered by Sir William Crookes.

Didymium photographic filters are often used to enhance autumn scenery by making leaves appear more vibrant. It does this by removing part of the orange region of the color spectrum, acting as an optical band-stop filter. Unfiltered, this group of colors tends to make certain elements of a picture appear "muddy". These photographic filters are also used by nightscape photographers, as they absorb part of the light pollution caused by sodium street lights. Didymium was also used in the sodium vapor process for matte work due to its ability to absorb the yellow color produced by its eponymous sodium lighting.

Didymium is also used in calibration materials for spectroscopy.

== Discovery ==
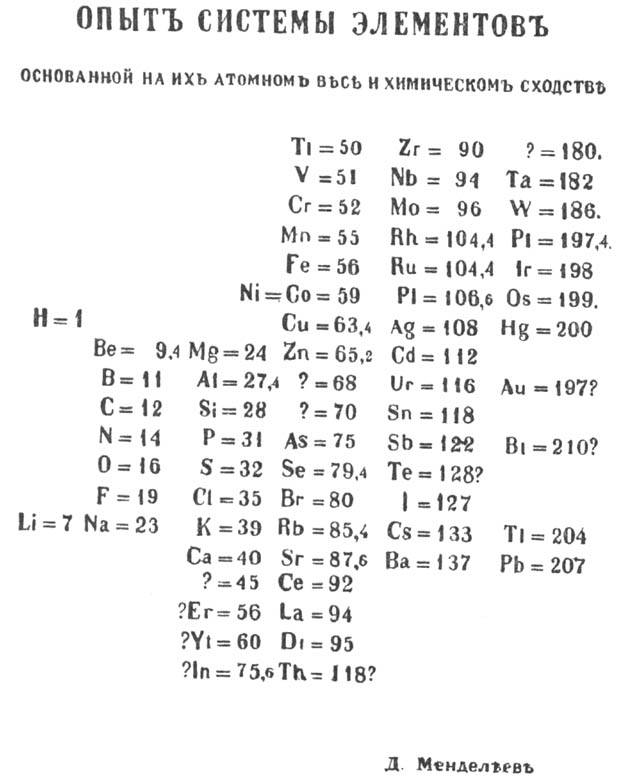
Didymium ("Di = 95") in the first edition of Dmitri Mendeleev's periodic table

Didymium was discovered by Carl Mosander in 1841. It was named after the Greek word δίδυμο (didymo, "twin") because it is very similar to lanthanum and cerium, with which it was found. Mosander wrongly believed didymium to be an element and that cerite, isolated by Jöns Jakob Berzelius in 1803, was a mixture of cerium, lanthanum, and didymium. Cerium, lanthanum, and didymium made up at least 95% of the rare earths in the original cerite from Bastnäs, Sweden.

In trivalent form, didymium tinged the salts of ceria pink. During the time that didymium was believed to be an element, the symbol Di was used for it. In Dmitri Mendeleev's first attempt at a periodic table, the atomic weights assigned to the lanthanides (including didymium) reflect the original belief that they were divalent. Their actual oxidation number of 3 implies that Mendeleev underestimated atomic weights for them by one third.

In 1874, Per Teodor Cleve deduced that didymium was made up of at least two elements. In 1879, Lecoq de Boisbaudran succeeded in isolating a samarium compound for the first time; the compound was isolated from didymium contained in North Carolinian samarskite. In 1885, Carl Auer von Welsbach succeeded in separating salts of the last two component elements, praseodymium and neodymium. To accomplish this, he used a fractional crystallization of the double ammonium nitrates from a solution of nitric acid.

Welsbach had decided to name his two new elements "praseodidymium" ("green didymium") and "neodidymium" ("new didymium"), but one syllable was soon dropped from each name. Despite being abbreviated in the new elements' names, the untruncated name "didymium" persisted, partly due to its use as an ingredient in glassblowers' goggles, and colored glass. The name "didymium" also was retained in mineralogical texts.

== Glassmaking ==
During World War I, didymium mirrors were reportedly used to transmit Morse Code across battlefields. Didymium does not absorb enough light to make the variation in lamp's light output obvious, but someone with binoculars attached to a prism in the correct fashion could see the absorption bands flash on and off.

In the late 1920s, Leo Moser (Moser glass-works Director General, 1916 to 1932) recombined praseodymium and neodymium in a 1:1 ratio to create his "Heliolite" glass ("Heliolit" in Czech), which has color-changing properties between amber, reddish, and green depending on the light source. This was one of a number of decorative glasses using rare earth colorants, with "Heliolit" and "Alexandrit" being the first two, introduced by Moser in 1929. Leo Moser's papers in the Corning Glass Museum make it clear that the first experimental glass melts done by Moser involving any of the rare earths occurred in November 1927.

After a year of further development, the rare earth glasses were introduced to great acclaim at the Spring 1929 trade show in Leipzig. The Alexandrit and Heliolit names were registered as trademarks in June 1929. The earlier date of 1925 sometimes given for rare earth glass refers to an award for glass design, not glass composition.

== Industrial use ==
The name "didymium" continued to be used in the rare earth metal industry. In the US, commercial "didymium" salts were what remained after cerium had been removed from the natural products obtained from monazite, and thus it contained lanthanum, as well as Mosander's "didymium". A typical composition might have been 46% lanthanum, 34% neodymium, and 11% praseodymium, with the remainder mostly being samarium and gadolinium, for material extracted from South African "rock monazite" from the Steenkampskraal mine.

In ores, neodymium is typically higher in relative abundance in monazite than in bastnäsite. The visual difference is apparent in unseparated mixtures: monazite-derived products have pink tinges, while bastnäsite-derived products have brown tinges due to their higher praseodymium content. The original cerite from Bastnäs may have had a rare earth composition similar to monazite sand.

The European use was closer to Mosander's concept. Such cerium-depleted light lanthanide mixtures have been widely used to make petroleum-cracking catalysts. The actual ratio of neodymium to praseodymium varies somewhat depending on the source of the mineral, but it is often around 3∶1. Neodymium is always present in higher proportions than praseodymium and is responsible for most of the color of didymium salts.
