= Methanol dehydrogenase (cytochrome c) =

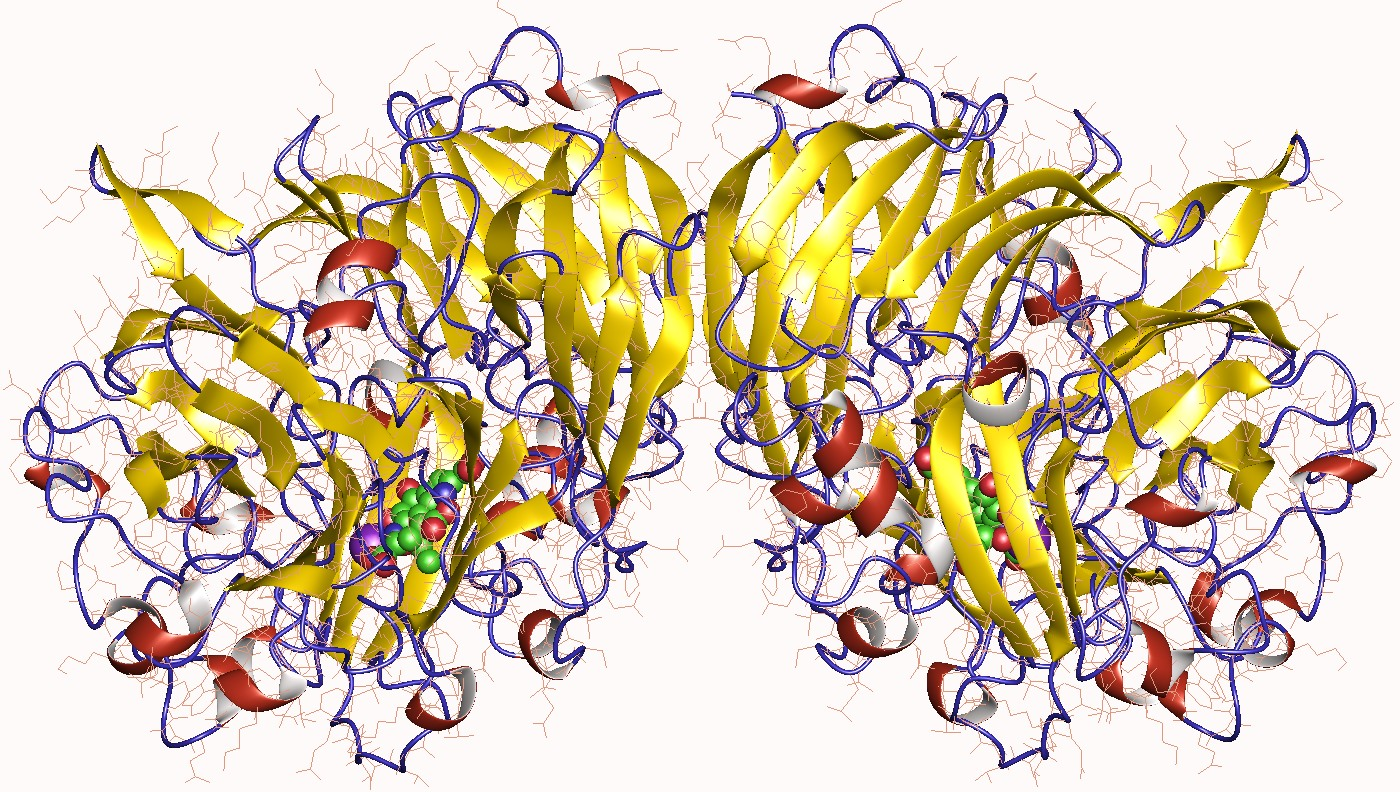
- Methanol dehydrogenase homodimer, Methylacidiphilum fumariolicum

Identifiers
- EC no.: 1.1.2.7
- CAS no.: 37205-43-9

Databases
- BRENDA: enzyme data
- ExPASy: NiceZyme view
- KEGG: enzyme entry
- MetaCyc: metabolic pathway
- Rhea: reactions
- PDB structures: RCSB PDB PDBe PDBsum
Search
- PMC: articles
- PubMed: articles
- NCBI: proteins

Methanol dehydrogenase (cytochrome c) (EC 1.1.2.7, methanol dehydrogenase, MDH) is an enzyme with systematic name methanol:cytochrome c oxidoreductase. This enzyme catalyses the following chemical reaction

a primary alcohol + 2 ferricytochrome cL $\rightleftharpoons$ an aldehyde + 2 ferrocytochrome cL + 2 H^{+}

A periplasmic quinoprotein alcohol dehydrogenase is only present in methylotrophic bacteria.

An (also PQQ-dependent) relative that uses lanthanides instead of calcium is lanthanide-dependent methanol dehydrogenase.
