= Mau Xe mine =

- Location: Lào Cai Province, Vietnam
- Products: Rare earths

The Mau Xe mine is one of the largest rare earths mines in Vietnam. The mine is located in northern Vietnam in Lào Cai Province. The mine has reserves amounting to 7.8 million tonnes of ore grading 4% RE.
