= Loparite-(Ce) =

Oxide mineral

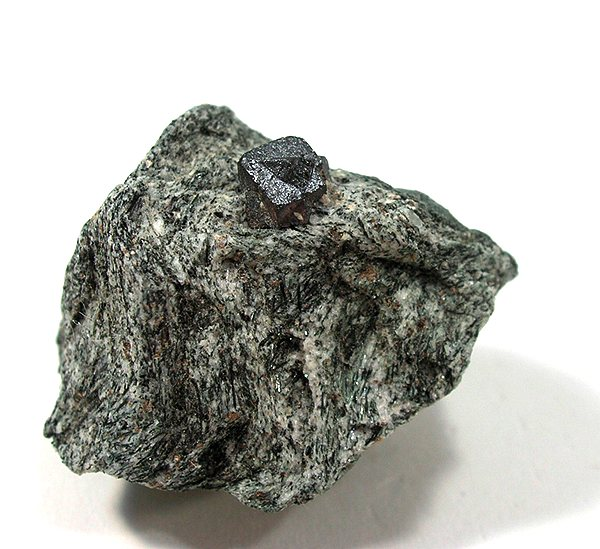

General
- Category: Oxide minerals
- Formula: (Ce,Na,Ca)(Ti,Nb)O_{3}
- IMA symbol: Lop-Ce
- Strunz classification: 4.CC.35
- Crystal system: Loparit-(Ce)-Q: tetragonal Loparit-(Ce)-O: orthorhombisch Loparit-(Ce)-C: cubic

Identification
- Color: Black to grey-brown in thin section
- Crystal habit: Cubic and octahedral crystals and massive
- Twinning: Penetration twins common on [111]
- Cleavage: [100] Imperfect
- Fracture: Uneven
- Tenacity: Brittle
- Mohs scale hardness: 5.5–6.0
- Luster: Metallic to sub-metallic
- Streak: Reddish brown
- Diaphaneity: opaque, transparent in thin fragments
- Specific gravity: 4.60–4.89
- Optical properties: Isotropic, anomalously anisotropic
- Refractive index: n = 2.26–2.38

Loparite-(Ce) is a granular, brittle oxide mineral of the perovskite class. It is black to dark grey and may appear grey to white in reflected light on polished thin section with reddish brown internal reflections. It has the chemical formula of (Ce,Na,Ca)(Ti,Nb)O_{3}. Nioboloparite is a variation of loparite-(Ce) containing niobium.

Loparite occurs as a primary phase in nepheline syenite intrusions and pegmatites. It is also found replacing perovskite in carbonatites.

Loparite was first described for an occurrence in the Khibiny and Lovozero massifs, Kola Peninsula in northern Russia.

Crystal structures of loparite

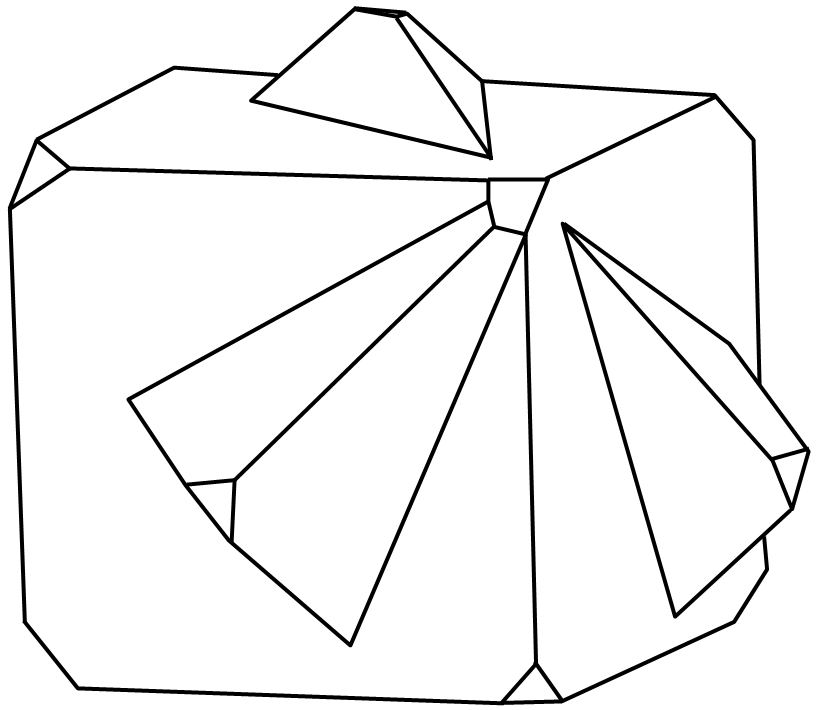

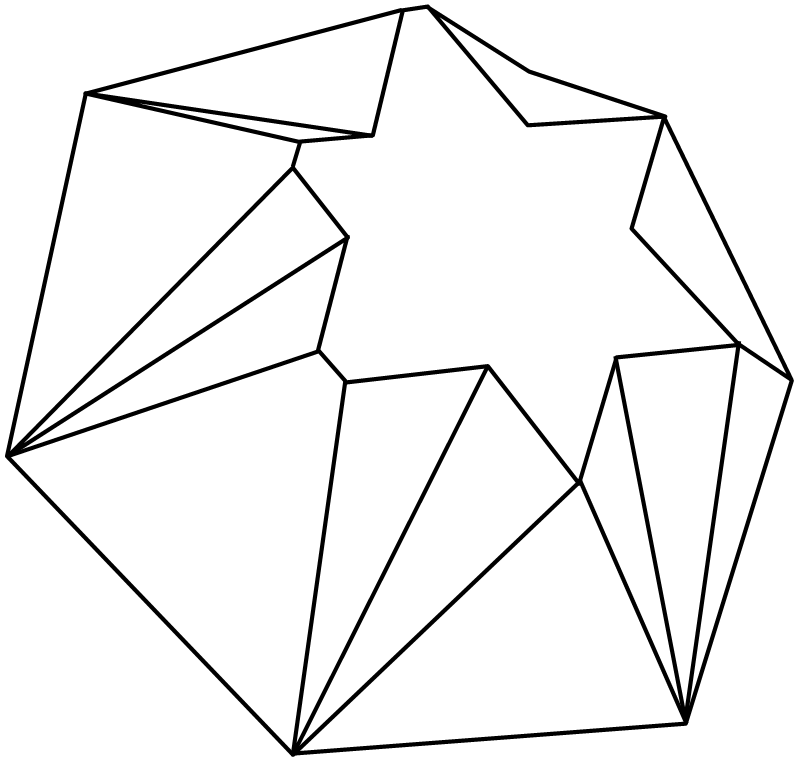

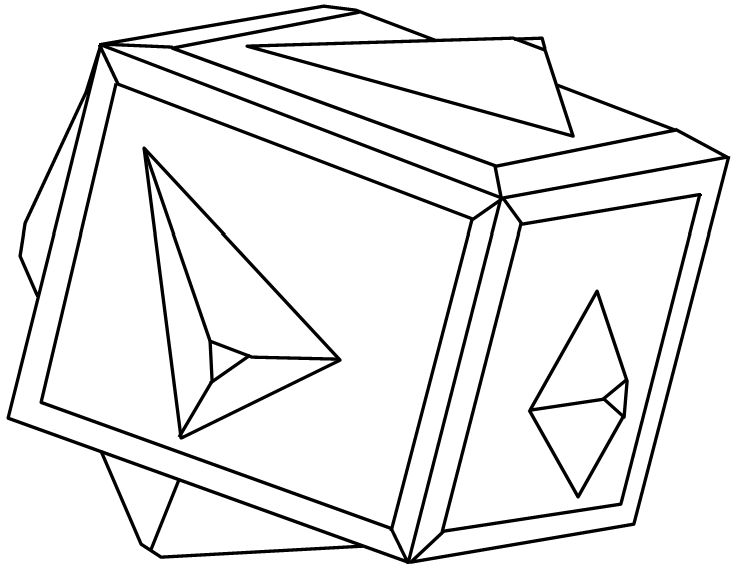

== Etymology ==
The term originates from the word Lopar, the former Russian name for the Sami indigenous inhabitants of the Kola Peninsula, and the cerium content.
