= Steenkampskraal mine =

Steenkampskraal Rare Earth Mine
- Location in South Africa
- Location: Matzikama Local Municipality, Western Cape, South Africa; 30°59′10.0931″S 18°37′44.6395″E
- Products: Rare-earth elements
- Website: https://www.steenkampskraal.com/

The Steenkampskraal Monazite Mine (SMM) is a rare-earth mine 71 km (44 mi) north of Vanrhynsdorp in the Western Cape province of South Africa.

== History ==
The mine was operated by Anglo American Corporation from 1952 to 1963.

In September 2025 the Industrial Development Corporation (IDC) of South Africa released funding for Phase 1: Metallurgical Implementation.

== Description ==
Steenkampskraal is a rare-earths mine located around 71 km (44 mi) north of Vanrhynsdorp, Western Cape, South Africa.

The mine is run by Steenkampskraal Monazite Mine (SMM) in partnership with Bora Mining Investments (BMI), who have acquired major investment in the mine.

The mine is considered to have the highest-grade ore of monazite in the world, at 50% Total Rare Earth Oxides (TREO). The total quantity of neodymium in the mine is 15,600 tons, at a resource grade of 2.58% Nd_{2}O_{3}.

The mine is expected to have a mine life of around 28 years.

In addition to the mining right area of 474 ha (1,170 acres), the company also owns three surrounding farms, with a total area of about 7,000 ha (17,000 acres).
