= Lanthanide-dependent methanol dehydrogenase =

Enzyme

- The enzyme as folded by AlphaFold

Identifiers
- EC no.: 1.1.2.10

Databases
- BRENDA: enzyme data
- ExPASy: NiceZyme view
- KEGG: enzyme entry
- MetaCyc: metabolic pathway
- Rhea: reactions
- PDB structures: RCSB PDB PDBe PDBsum
Search
- PMC: articles
- PubMed: articles
- NCBI: proteins

Lanthanide-dependent methanol dehydrogenase (Note: also known as Ce(3+)-induced methanol dehydrogenase, cerium dependent MDH and La(3+)-dependent MDH) is an oxidoreductase enzyme involved in methane metabolic pathways in microbial metabolism. This enzyme was first isolated from Methylacidiphilum fumariolicum and others in the Methylacidiphilum family. The enzyme requires La^{3+}, Ce^{3+}, Pr^{3+} or Nd^{3+}. Higher lanthanides show decreasing activity with Sm^{3+}, Eu^{3+} and Gd^{3+}. The lanthanide atom in the enzyme is coordinated by pyrroloquinoline quinone. The enzyme catalyzes the following reaction:

2 Fe(III)-cytochrome cL + methanol -> 2 Fe(II)-cytochrome cL + formaldehyde + 2 H^{+}

It is related to the (also PQQ-dependent) methanol dehydrogenase (cytochrome c), which instead uses calcium to catalyze the same reaction.

== Background ==
Methylotrophic bacteria are those that consume one-carbon and methylated compounds as the primary carbon source. These bacteria have been known for a century and are largely important in methane and methanol biogeochemical cycles. For the majority of the history of studies on these enzymes, pyrroloquinoline quinone (PQQ)-dependent methanol dehydrogenases were said to be the primary enzymes for the oxidation of methanol. The machinery of the PQQ-dependent enzyme is largely Conserved among the α, β, and γ-protebacteria.

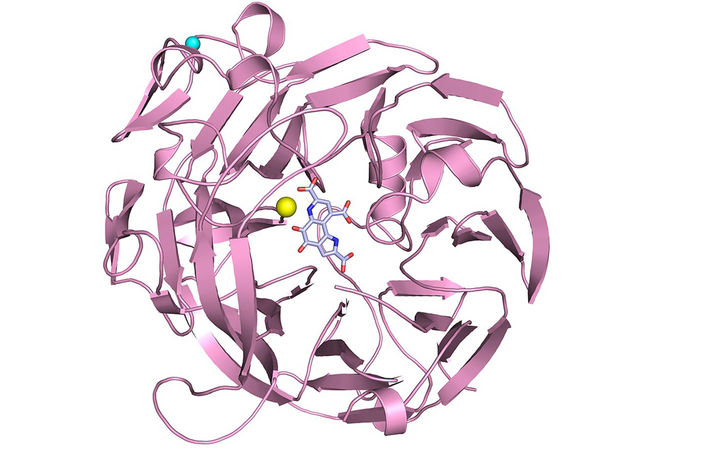
A ribbon diagram of the PQQ-dependent methanol deydrogenase.

The discovery of lanthanide-dependent methanol dehydrogenases changed this belief, originally a seen as a homolog of MoxF. Several of these enzymes showed methanol dehydrogenase activity in the presence of lanthanide ions such as Ln^{3+}. In the study of metaloenzymes, it was originally believed that Ln^{3+} was biologically unimportant, but the discovery of Ln^{3+}-dependent AHDs revealed more about the biological activity of lanthanides.

== Structure ==
In the homodimeric Ce^{3+}-dependent methanol dehydrogenase sampled from methylacidiphilum fuimariolicum SolIV, the active site consists of glutamate, asparagine and aspartic acid residues that form a coordination complex for the Cerium ion. In protein crystallization studies, a molecule of polyethylene glycol occupies a substrate binding coordination position of Ce^{3+}. The bacterial enzymes are known to interact with two cytochromes, c_{L} and c_{H}. Once methanol is oxidized, PQQ is reduced. The re-oxidation of PQQ is facilitated through the stepwise electron transfer to the cytochromes.

== Reaction ==
The reaction catalyzed by lanthanide-dependent methanol dehydrogenase is one that oxidizes methanol to form formaldehyde and hydrogen ions. The essential cofactors include a PQQ prosthetic group at the active site, in addition to essential cytochromes present for electron transfer. The enzyme acts at the CH-OH site.

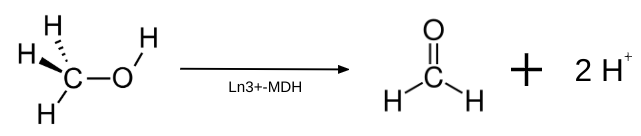
The reaction catalyzed by Ln3-MDH. Note that the essential cofactors and cytochromes are not shown in the diagram.

MDHs in the methylobacterium species are typically shown to depend also on Ca^{2+} when grown on methanol. However, studies conducted with MDH on a methanol-substrate that were given only Ln^{3+} and not Ca^{3+} showed growth, indicating that MDHs (particularly Ln^{3+}-dependent ones) can oxidize menthol and form formaldehyde even without calcium ions present.
