= Solid =

State of matter

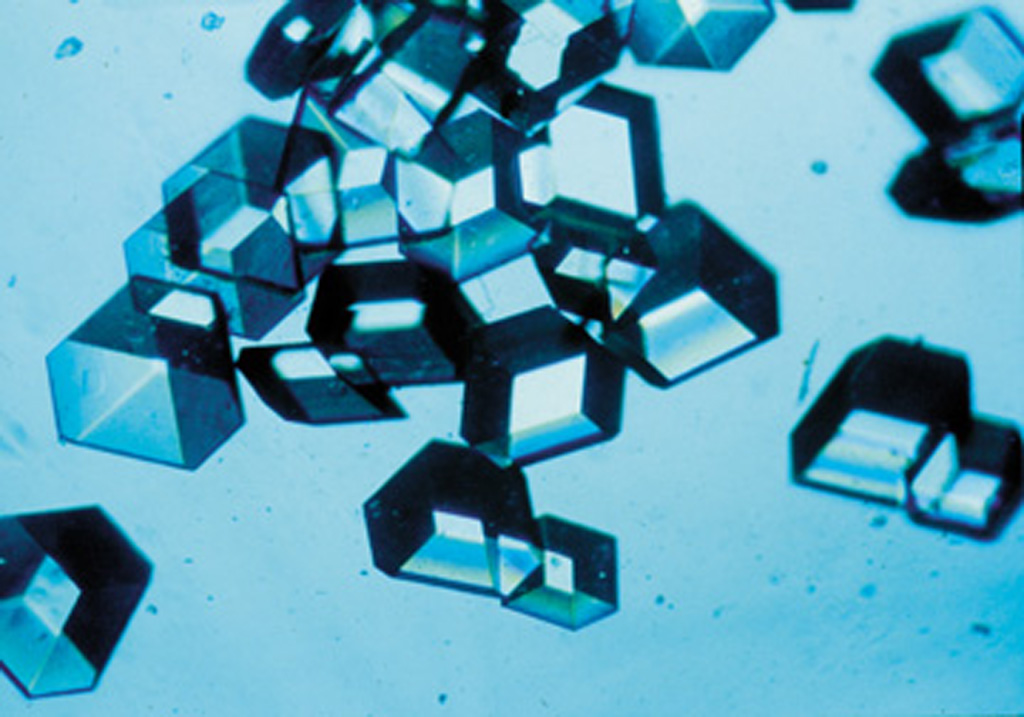
Single crystalline form of solid insulin.

Solid is a state of matter in which atoms are closely packed and are difficult to move past each other. Solids resist compression, expansion, or external forces that would alter its shape, with the degree of resistance being dependent upon the specific material under consideration. Solids also always possess the least kinetic energy per atom/molecule relative to other phases or, equivalently stated, solids are formed when matter in a fluid phase (liquid or gas) is cooled below a certain temperature. This temperature is called the melting point of the substance and is an intrinsic property; i.e. independent of how much of the matter there is. The vast majority of substances, when in the solid state, can be arranged in one of a few ubiquitous structures.

Solids are characterized by structural rigidity and resistance to applied external forces and pressure. Unlike liquids, solids do not flow to take on the shape of their container, nor do they expand to fill the entire available volume like a gas. Much like the other three fundamental phases, solids also expand when heated, the thermal energy put into increasing the distance and reducing the potential energy between atoms. However, solids do this to a much lesser extent. When heated to their melting point or sublimation point, solids melt into a liquid or sublimate directly into a gas, respectively. For solids that directly sublimate into a gas, the melting point is replaced by the sublimation point. As a rule of thumb, melting will occur if the subjected pressure is higher than the substance's triple point pressure, and sublimation will occur otherwise. Melting and melting points refer exclusively to transitions between solids and liquids. Melting occurs across a great extent of temperatures, ranging from 0.10 K for helium-3 under 30 bars (3 MPa) of pressure, to around 4,100 K at 1 atm for the composite refractory material hafnium carbonitride.

The atoms in a solid are tightly bound to each other in one of two ways: regular geometric lattices called crystalline solids (e.g. metals, water ice), or irregular arrangements called amorphous solids (e.g. glass, plastic). Molecules and atoms forming crystalline lattices usually organize themselves in a few well-characterized packing structures, such as body-centered cubic. The adopted structure can and will vary between various pressures and temperatures, as can be seen in phase diagrams of the material (e.g. that of water, see left and upper). When the material is composed of a single species of atom/molecule, the phases are designated as allotropes for atoms (e.g. diamond and graphite for carbon), and as polymorphs (e.g. calcite and aragonite for calcium carbonate) for molecules.

Non-porous solids invariably strongly resist any amount of compression that would otherwise result in a decrease of total volume regardless of temperature, owing to the mutual repulsion of neighboring electron clouds among its constituent atoms. In contrast to solids, gases are very easily compressed as the molecules in a gas are far apart with few intermolecular interactions. Some solids, especially metallic alloys, can be deformed or pulled apart with enough force. The degree to which this solid resists deformation in differing directions and axes are quantified by the elastic modulus, tensile strength, specific strength, as well as other measurable quantities, and overall by compressibility.

For the vast majority of substances, the solid phases have the highest density, moderately higher than that of the liquid phase (if there exists one), and solid blocks of these materials will sink below their liquids. Exceptions include water (see e.g. icebergs), gallium, and plutonium. All naturally occurring elements on the periodic table have a melting point at standard atmospheric pressure, with three exceptions: the noble gas helium, which remains a liquid even at absolute zero owing to zero-point energy; the metalloid arsenic, sublimating around 900 K; and the life-forming element carbon, which sublimates around 3,950 K.

When applied pressure is released, solids will (very) rapidly re-expand and release the stored energy in the process in a manner somewhat similar to those of gases. An example of this is the (oft-attempted) confinement of freezing water in a container that is inflexible (made of steel, for example). The gradual freezing results in an increase in volume, as ice is less dense than water. With no additional volume to expand into, water ice subjects the interior to intense pressures, causing the container to explode with great force.

Solids' properties on a macroscopic scale can also depend on whether it is contiguous or not. Contiguous (non-aggregate) solids are characterized by structural rigidity (as in rigid bodies) and strong resistance to applied forces. For solids aggregates (e.g. gravel, sand, dust on lunar surface), solid particles can easily slip past one another, though changes of individual particles (quartz particles for sand) will still be greatly hindered. This leads to a perceived softness and ease of compression by operators. An illustrating example is the non-firmness of coastal sand and of the lunar regolith.

The branch of physics that deals with solids is called solid-state physics, and is a major branch of condensed matter physics (which includes liquids). Materials science, also one of its numerous branches, is primarily concerned with the way in which a solid's composition and its properties are intertwined.

== Microscopic description ==
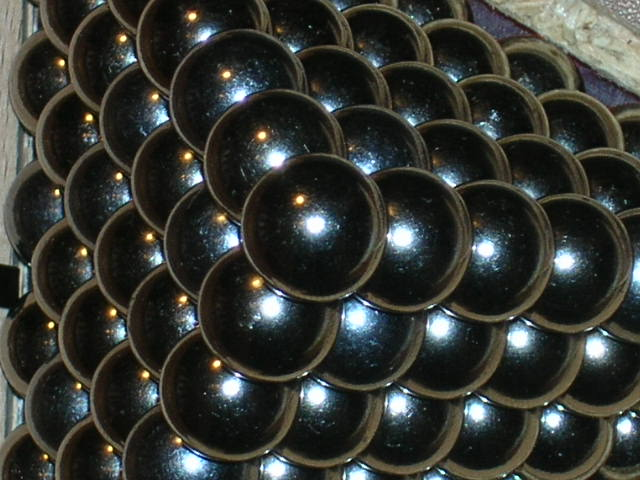
Model of closely packed atoms within a crystalline solid

The atoms, molecules or ions that make up solids may be arranged in an orderly repeating pattern, or irregularly. Materials whose constituents are arranged in a regular pattern are known as crystals. In some cases, the regular ordering can continue unbroken over a large scale, for example diamonds, where each diamond is a single crystal. Solid objects that are large enough to see and handle are rarely composed of a single crystal, but instead are made of a large number of single crystals, known as crystallites, whose size can vary from a few nanometers to several meters. Such materials are called polycrystalline. Almost all common metals, and many ceramics, are polycrystalline.

Schematic representation of a random-network glassy form (left) and ordered crystalline lattice (right) of identical chemical composition.

In other materials, there is no long-range order in the position of the atoms. These solids are known as amorphous solids; examples include polystyrene and glass.

Whether a solid is crystalline or amorphous depends on the material involved, and the conditions in which it was formed. Solids that are formed by slow cooling will tend to be crystalline, while solids that are frozen rapidly are more likely to be amorphous. Likewise, the specific crystal structure adopted by a crystalline solid depends on the material involved and on how it was formed.

While many common objects, such as an ice cube or a coin, are chemically identical throughout, many other common materials comprise a number of different substances packed together. For example, a typical rock is an aggregate of several different minerals and mineraloids, with no specific chemical composition. Wood is a natural organic material consisting primarily of cellulose fibers embedded in a matrix of organic lignin. In materials science, composites of more than one constituent material can be designed to have desired properties.

== Classes of solids ==
The forces between the atoms in a solid can take a variety of forms. For example, a crystal of sodium chloride (common salt) is made up of ionic sodium and chlorine, which are held together by ionic bonds. In diamond or silicon, the atoms share electrons and form covalent bonds. In metals, electrons are shared in metallic bonding. Some solids, particularly most organic compounds, are held together with van der Waals forces resulting from the polarization of the electronic charge cloud on each molecule. The dissimilarities between the types of solid result from the differences between their bonding.

=== Metals ===
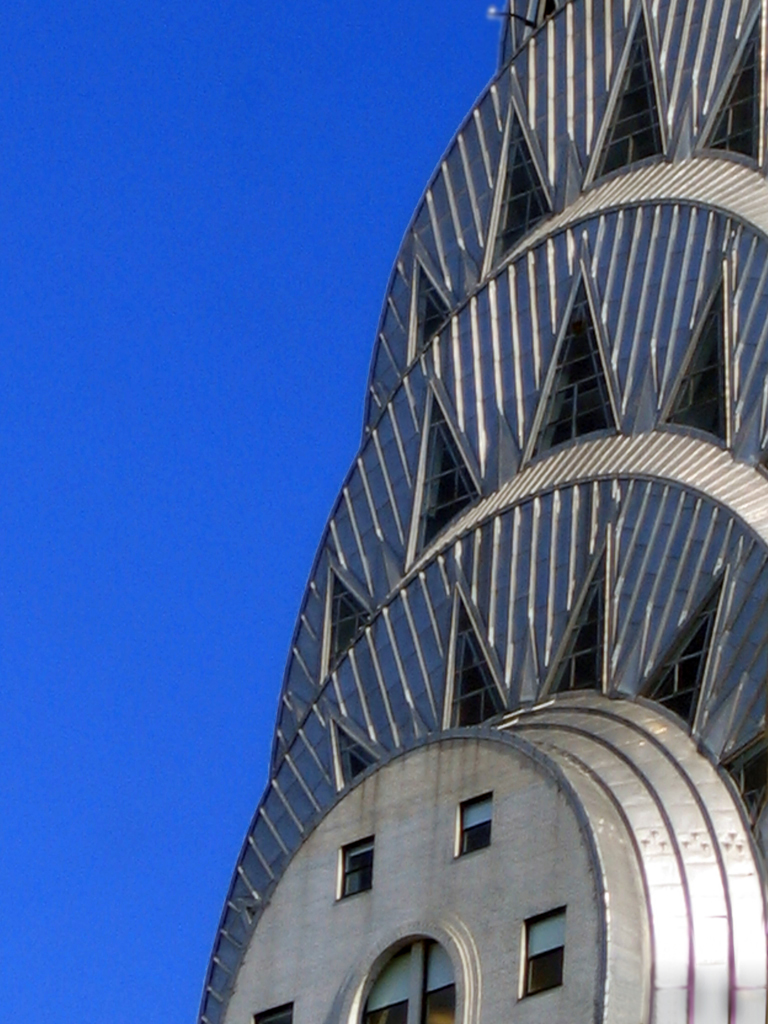
The pinnacle of New York's Chrysler Building, the world's tallest steel-supported brick building, is clad with stainless steel.

Metals typically are strong, dense, and good conductors of both electricity and heat. The bulk of the elements in the periodic table, those to the left of a diagonal line drawn from boron to polonium, are metals. Mixtures of two or more elements in which the major component is a metal are known as alloys.

People have been using metals for a variety of purposes since prehistoric times. The strength and reliability of metals has led to their widespread use in construction of buildings and other structures, as well as in most vehicles, many appliances and tools, pipes, road signs and railroad tracks. Iron and aluminium are the two most commonly used structural metals. They are also the most abundant metals in the Earth's crust. Iron is most commonly used in the form of an alloy, steel, which contains up to 2.1% carbon, making it much harder than pure iron.

Because metals are good conductors of electricity, they are valuable in electrical appliances and for carrying an electric current over long distances with little energy loss or dissipation. Thus, electrical power grids rely on metal cables to distribute electricity. Home electrical systems, for example, are wired with copper for its good conducting properties and easy machinability. The high thermal conductivity of most metals also makes them useful for stovetop cooking utensils.

The study of metallic elements and their alloys makes up a significant portion of the fields of solid-state chemistry, physics, materials science and engineering.

Metallic solids are held together by a high density of shared, delocalized electrons, known as "metallic bonding". In a metal, atoms readily lose their outermost ("valence") electrons, forming positive ions. The free electrons are spread over the entire solid, which is held together firmly by electrostatic interactions between the ions and the electron cloud. The large number of free electrons gives metals their high values of electrical and thermal conductivity. The free electrons also prevent transmission of visible light, making metals opaque, shiny and lustrous.

More advanced models of metal properties consider the effect of the positive ions cores on the delocalised electrons. As most metals have crystalline structure, those ions are usually arranged into a periodic lattice. Mathematically, the potential of the ion cores can be treated by various models, the simplest being the nearly free electron model.

=== Minerals ===
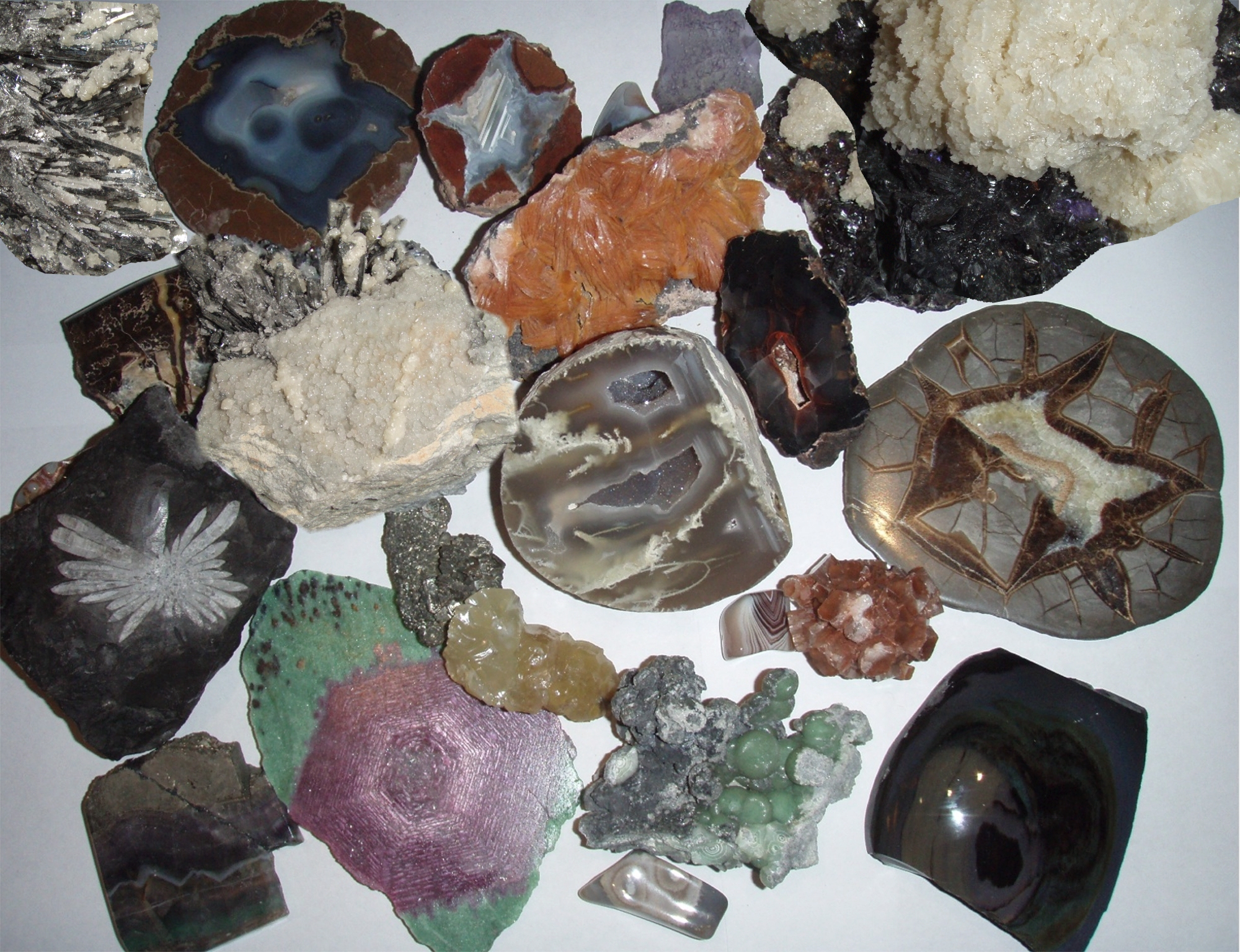
A collection of various minerals.

Minerals are naturally occurring solids formed through various geological processes under high pressures. To be classified as a true mineral, a substance must have a crystal structure with uniform physical properties throughout. Minerals range in composition from pure elements and simple salts to very complex silicates with thousands of known forms. In contrast, a rock sample is a random aggregate of minerals and/or mineraloids, and has no specific chemical composition. The vast majority of the rocks of the Earth's crust consist of quartz (crystalline SiO_{2}), feldspar, mica, chlorite, kaolin, calcite, epidote, olivine, augite, hornblende, magnetite, hematite, limonite and a few other minerals. Some minerals, like quartz, mica or feldspar are common, while others have been found in only a few locations worldwide. The largest group of minerals by far is the silicates (most rocks are ≥95% silicates), which are composed largely of silicon and oxygen, with the addition of ions of aluminium, magnesium, iron, calcium and other metals.

=== Ceramics ===
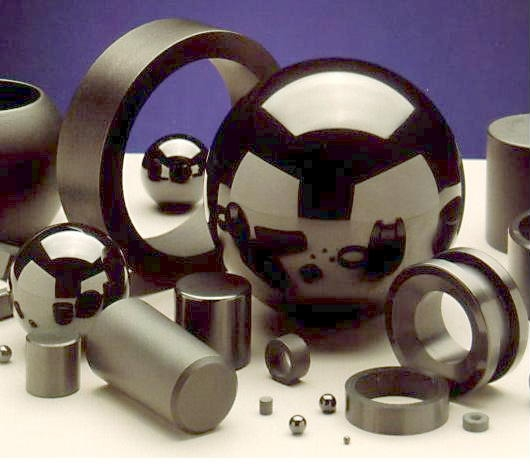
Si_{3}N_{4} ceramic bearing parts

Ceramic solids are composed of inorganic compounds, usually oxides of chemical elements. They are chemically inert, and often are capable of withstanding chemical erosion that occurs in an acidic or caustic environment. Ceramics generally can withstand high temperatures ranging from 1,000 to 1,600 °C (1,830 to 2,910 °F). Exceptions include non-oxide inorganic materials, such as nitrides, borides and carbides.

Traditional ceramic raw materials include clay minerals such as kaolinite, more recent materials include aluminium oxide (alumina). The modern ceramic materials, which are classified as advanced ceramics, include silicon carbide and tungsten carbide. Both are valued for their abrasion resistance, and hence find use in such applications as the wear plates of crushing equipment in mining operations.

Most ceramic materials, such as alumina and its compounds, are formed from fine powders, yielding a fine grained polycrystalline microstructure that is filled with light-scattering centers comparable to the wavelength of visible light. Thus, they are generally opaque materials, as opposed to transparent materials. Recent nanoscale (e.g. sol-gel) technology has, however, made possible the production of polycrystalline transparent ceramics such as transparent alumina and alumina compounds for such applications as high-power lasers. Advanced ceramics are also used in the medicine, electrical and electronics industries.

Ceramic engineering is the science and technology of creating solid-state ceramic materials, parts and devices. This is done either by the action of heat, or, at lower temperatures, using precipitation reactions from chemical solutions. The term includes the purification of raw materials, the study and production of the chemical compounds concerned, their formation into components, and the study of their structure, composition and properties.

Mechanically speaking, ceramic materials are brittle, hard, strong in compression and weak in shearing and tension. Brittle materials may exhibit significant tensile strength by supporting a static load. Toughness indicates how much energy a material can absorb before mechanical failure, while fracture toughness (denoted K_{Ic}) describes the ability of a material with inherent microstructural flaws to resist fracture via crack growth and propagation. If a material has a large value of fracture toughness, the basic principles of fracture mechanics suggest that it will most likely undergo ductile fracture. Brittle fracture is very characteristic of most ceramic and glass-ceramic materials that typically exhibit low (and inconsistent) values of K_{Ic}.

For an example of applications of ceramics, the extreme hardness of zirconia is utilized in the manufacture of knife blades, as well as other industrial cutting tools. Ceramics such as alumina, boron carbide and silicon carbide have been used in bulletproof vests to repel large-caliber rifle fire. Silicon nitride parts are used in ceramic ball bearings, where their high hardness makes them wear resistant. In general, ceramics are also chemically resistant and can be used in wet environments where steel bearings would be susceptible to oxidation (or rust).

As another example of ceramic applications, in the early 1980s, Toyota researched production of an adiabatic ceramic engine with an operating temperature of over 6,000 °F (3,320 °C). Ceramic engines do not require a cooling system and hence allow a major weight reduction and therefore greater fuel efficiency. In a conventional metallic engine, much of the energy released from the fuel must be dissipated as waste heat in order to prevent a meltdown of the metallic parts. Work is also being done in developing ceramic parts for gas turbine engines. Turbine engines made with ceramics could operate more efficiently, giving aircraft greater range and payload for a set amount of fuel. Such engines are not in production, however, because the manufacturing of ceramic parts in the sufficient precision and durability is difficult and costly. Processing methods often result in a wide distribution of microscopic flaws that frequently play a detrimental role in the sintering process, resulting in the proliferation of cracks, and ultimate mechanical failure.

=== Glass ceramics ===
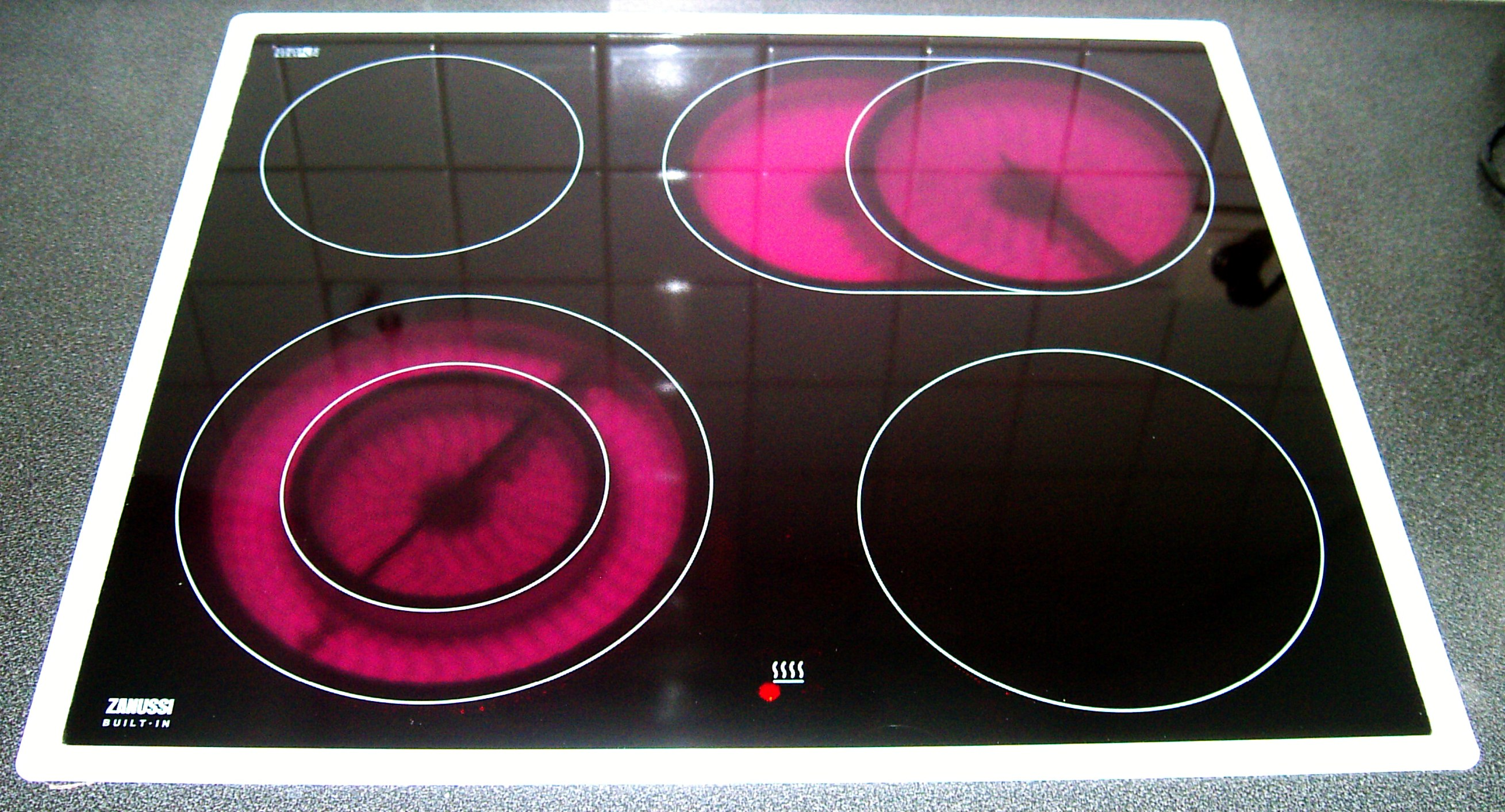
A high strength glass-ceramic cooktop with negligible thermal expansion.

Glass-ceramic materials share many properties with both non-crystalline glasses and crystalline ceramics. They are formed as a glass, and then partially crystallized by heat treatment, producing both amorphous and crystalline phases so that crystalline grains are embedded within a non-crystalline intergranular phase.

Glass-ceramics are used to make cookware (originally known by the brand name CorningWare) and stovetops that have high resistance to thermal shock and extremely low permeability to liquids. The negative coefficient of thermal expansion of the crystalline ceramic phase can be balanced with the positive coefficient of the glassy phase. At a certain point (~70% crystalline) the glass-ceramic has a net coefficient of thermal expansion close to zero. This type of glass-ceramic exhibits excellent mechanical properties and can sustain repeated and quick temperature changes up to 1000 °C.

Glass ceramics may also occur naturally when lightning strikes the crystalline (e.g. quartz) grains found in most beach sand. In this case, the extreme and immediate heat of the lightning (~2500 °C) creates hollow, branching rootlike structures called fulgurite via fusion.

=== Organic solids ===
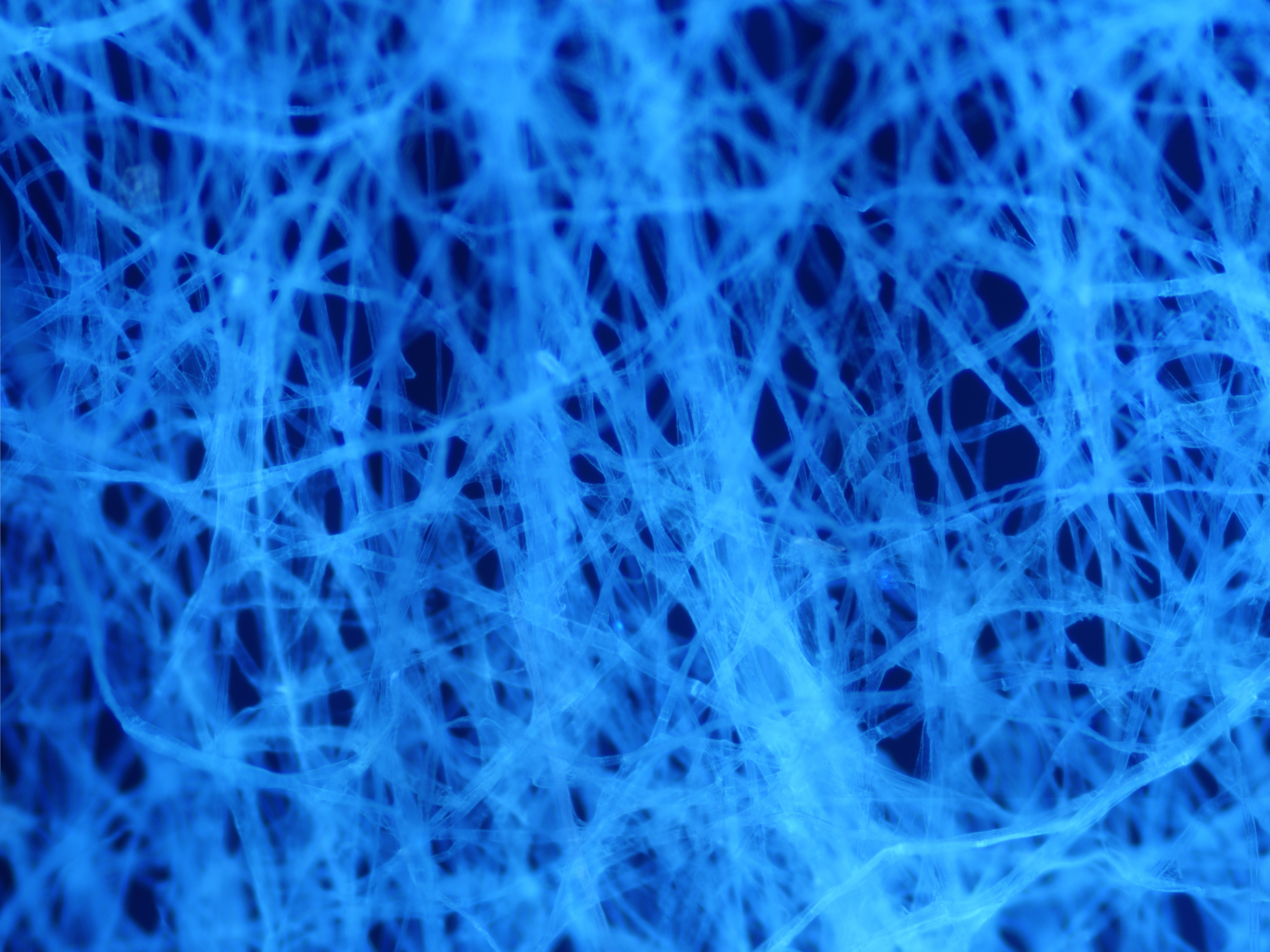
The individual wood pulp fibers in this sample are around 10 μm in diameter.

Organic chemistry studies the structure, properties, composition, reactions, and preparation by synthesis (or other means) of chemical compounds of carbon and hydrogen, which may contain any number of other elements such as nitrogen, oxygen and the halogens: fluorine, chlorine, bromine and iodine. Some organic compounds may also contain the elements phosphorus or sulfur. Examples of organic solids include wood, paraffin wax, naphthalene and a wide variety of polymers and plastics.

==== Wood ====
Wood is a natural organic material consisting primarily of cellulose fibers embedded in a matrix of lignin. Regarding mechanical properties, the fibers are strong in tension, and the lignin matrix resists compression. Thus wood has been an important construction material since humans began building shelters and using boats. Wood to be used for construction work is commonly known as lumber or timber. In construction, wood is not only a structural material, but is also used to form the mould for concrete.

Wood-based materials are also extensively used for packaging (e.g. cardboard) and paper, which are both created from the refined pulp. The chemical pulping processes use a combination of high temperature and alkaline (kraft) or acidic (sulfite) chemicals to break the chemical bonds of the lignin before burning it out.

==== Polymers ====
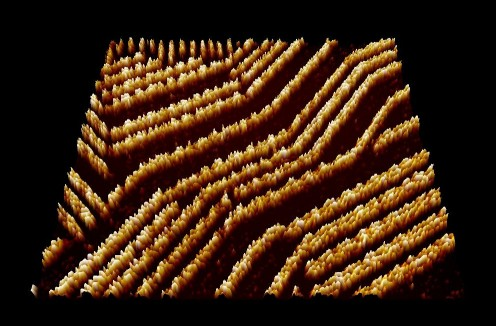
STM image of self-assembled supramolecular chains of the organic semiconductor quinacridone on graphite.

One important property of carbon in organic chemistry is that it can form certain compounds, the individual molecules of which are capable of attaching themselves to one another, thereby forming a chain or a network. The process is called polymerization and the chains or networks polymers, while the source compound is a monomer. Two main groups of polymers exist: those artificially manufactured are referred to as industrial polymers or synthetic polymers (plastics) and those naturally occurring as biopolymers.

Monomers can have various chemical substituents, or functional groups, which can affect the chemical properties of organic compounds, such as solubility and chemical reactivity, as well as the physical properties, such as hardness, density, mechanical or tensile strength, abrasion resistance, heat resistance, transparency, color, etc.. In proteins, these differences give the polymer the ability to adopt a biologically active conformation in preference to others (see self-assembly).

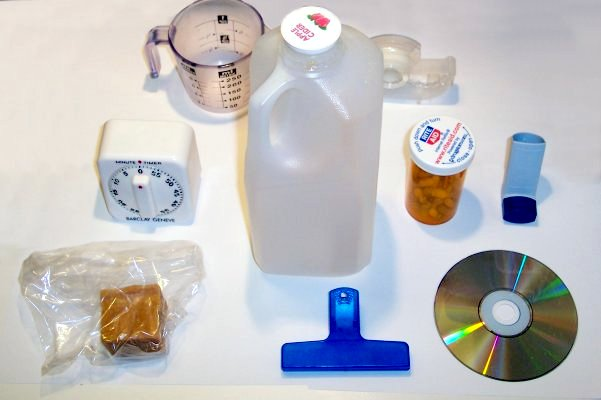
Household items made of various kinds of plastic.

People have been using natural organic polymers for centuries in the form of waxes and shellac, which is classified as a thermoplastic polymer. A plant polymer named cellulose provided the tensile strength for natural fibers and ropes, and by the early 19th century natural rubber was in widespread use. Polymers are the raw materials (the resins) used to make what are commonly called plastics. Plastics are the final product, created after one or more polymers or additives have been added to a resin during processing, which is then shaped into a final form. Polymers that have been around, and that are in current widespread use, include carbon-based polyethylene, polypropylene, polyvinyl chloride, polystyrene, nylons, polyesters, acrylics, polyurethane, and polycarbonates, and silicon-based silicones. Plastics are generally classified as "commodity", "specialty" and "engineering" plastics.

=== Composite materials ===
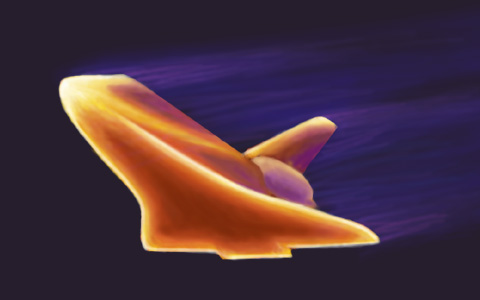
Simulation of the outside of the Space Shuttle as it heats up to over 1500 °C during re-entry

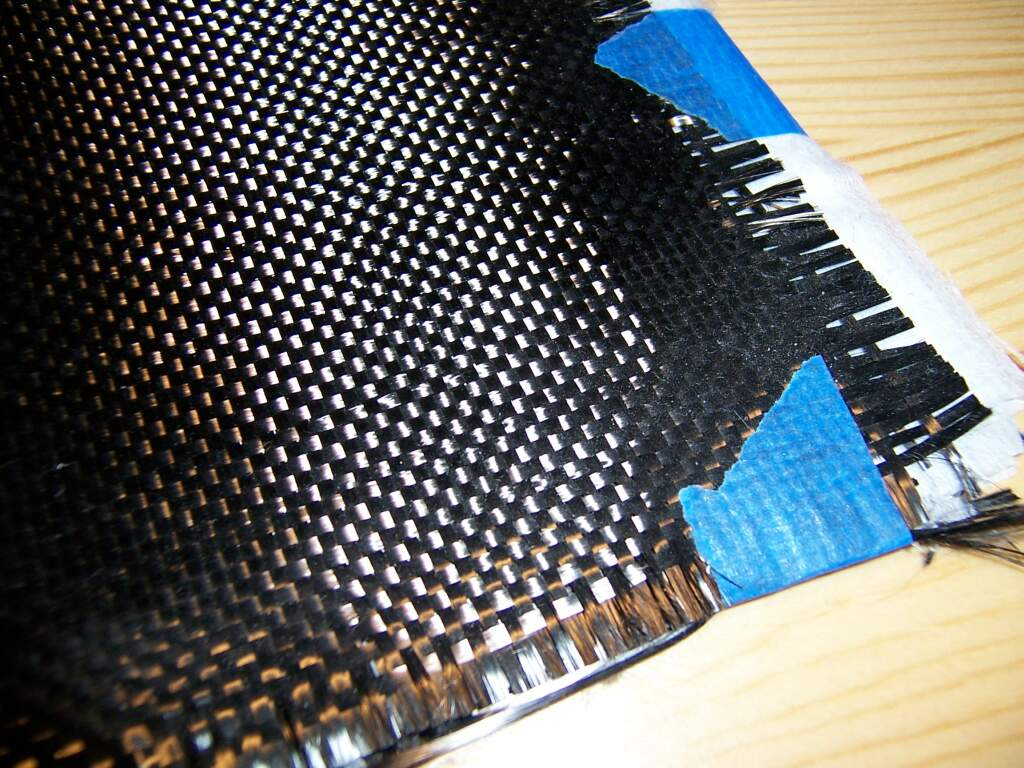
A cloth of woven carbon fiber filaments, a common element in composite materials

Composite materials contain two or more macroscopic phases, one of which is often ceramic. For example, a continuous matrix, and a dispersed phase of ceramic particles or fibers.

Applications of composite materials range from structural elements such as steel-reinforced concrete, to the thermally insulative tiles that play a key and integral role in NASA's Space Shuttle thermal protection system, which is used to protect the surface of the shuttle from the heat of re-entry into the Earth's atmosphere. One example is Reinforced Carbon-Carbon (RCC), the light gray material that withstands reentry temperatures up to 1,510 °C (2,750 °F) and protects the nose cap and leading edges of Space Shuttle's wings. RCC is a laminated composite material made from graphite rayon cloth and impregnated with a phenolic resin. After curing at high temperature in an autoclave, the laminate is pyrolized to convert the resin to carbon, impregnated with furfural alcohol in a vacuum chamber, and cured/pyrolized to convert the furfural alcohol to carbon. In order to provide oxidation resistance for reuse capability, the outer layers of the RCC are converted to silicon carbide.

Domestic examples of composites can be seen in the "plastic" casings of television sets, cell-phones and so on. These plastic casings are usually a composite made up of a thermoplastic matrix such as acrylonitrile butadiene styrene (ABS) in which calcium carbonate chalk, talc, glass fibers or carbon fibers have been added for strength, bulk, or electro-static dispersion. These additions may be referred to as reinforcing fibers, or dispersants, depending on their purpose.

Thus, the matrix material surrounds and supports the reinforcement materials by maintaining their relative positions. The reinforcements impart their special mechanical and physical properties to enhance the matrix properties. A synergism produces material properties unavailable from the individual constituent materials, while the wide variety of matrix and strengthening materials provides the designer with the choice of an optimum combination.

=== Semiconductors ===
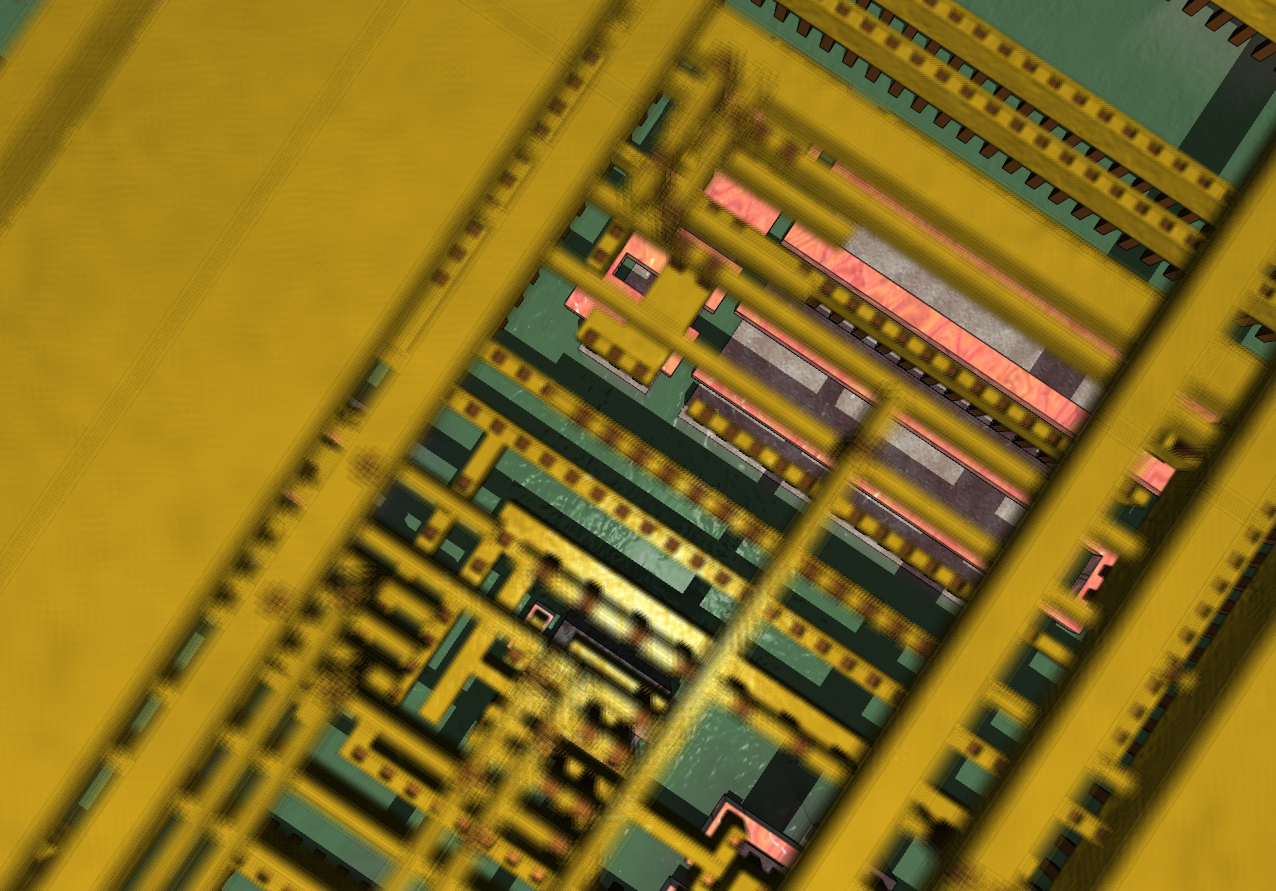
Semiconductor chip on crystalline silicon substrate.

Semiconductors are materials that have an electrical resistivity (and conductivity) between that of metallic conductors and non-metallic insulators. They can be found in the periodic table moving diagonally downward right from boron. They separate the electrical conductors (or metals, to the left) from the insulators (to the right).

Devices made from semiconductor materials are the foundation of modern electronics, including radio, computers, telephones, etc. Semiconductor devices include the transistor, solar cells, diodes and integrated circuits. Solar photovoltaic panels are large semiconductor devices that directly convert light into electrical energy.

In a metallic conductor, current is carried by the flow of electrons, but in semiconductors, current can be carried either by electrons or by the positively charged "holes" in the electronic band structure of the material. Common semiconductor materials include silicon, germanium and gallium arsenide.

=== Nanomaterials ===
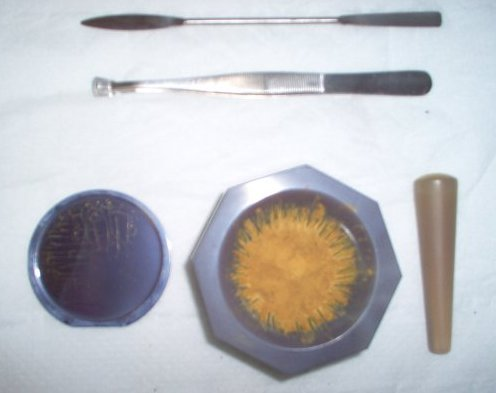
Bulk silicon (left) and silicon nanopowder (right)

Many traditional solids exhibit different properties when they shrink to nanometer sizes. For example, nanoparticles of usually yellow gold and gray silicon are red in color; gold nanoparticles melt at much lower temperatures (~300 °C for 2.5 nm size) than the gold slabs (1064 °C); and metallic nanowires are much stronger than the corresponding bulk metals. The high surface area of nanoparticles makes them extremely attractive for certain applications in the field of energy. For example, platinum metals may provide improvements as automotive fuel catalysts, as well as proton exchange membrane (PEM) fuel cells. Also, ceramic oxides (or cermets) of lanthanum, cerium, manganese and nickel are now being developed as solid oxide fuel cells (SOFC). Lithium, lithium-titanate and tantalum nanoparticles are being applied in lithium-ion batteries. Silicon nanoparticles have been shown to dramatically expand the storage capacity of lithium-ion batteries during the expansion/contraction cycle. Silicon nanowires cycle without significant degradation and present the potential for use in batteries with greatly expanded storage times. Silicon nanoparticles are also being used in new forms of solar energy cells. Thin film deposition of silicon quantum dots on the polycrystalline silicon substrate of a photovoltaic (solar) cell increases voltage output as much as 60% by fluorescing the incoming light prior to capture. Here again, surface area of the nanoparticles (and thin films) plays a critical role in maximizing the amount of absorbed radiation.

=== Biomaterials ===
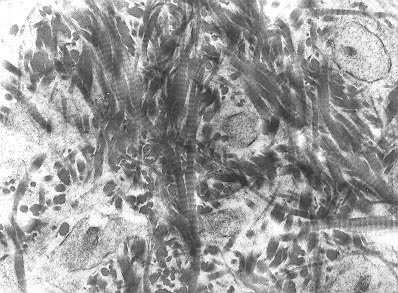
Collagen fibers of woven bone

Many natural (or biological) materials are complex composites with remarkable mechanical properties. These complex structures, which have risen from hundreds of million years of evolution, are inspiring materials scientists in the design of novel materials. Their defining characteristics include structural hierarchy, multifunctionality and self-healing capability. Self-organization is also a fundamental feature of many biological materials and the manner by which the structures are assembled from the molecular level up. Thus, self-assembly is emerging as a new strategy in the chemical synthesis of high performance biomaterials.

== Physical properties ==
Physical properties of elements and compounds that provide conclusive evidence of chemical composition include odor, color, volume, density (mass per unit volume), melting point, boiling point, heat capacity, physical form and shape at room temperature (solid, liquid or gas; cubic, trigonal crystals, etc.), hardness, porosity, index of refraction and many others. This section discusses some physical properties of materials in the solid state.

=== Mechanical ===
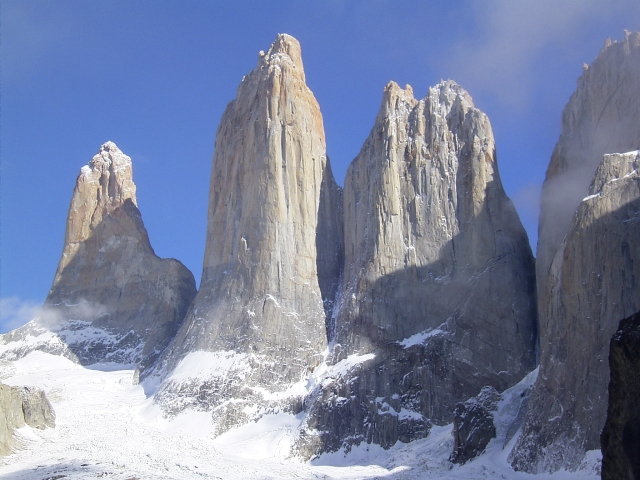
Granite rock formation in the Chilean Patagonia. Like most inorganic minerals formed by oxidation in the Earth's atmosphere, granite consists primarily of crystalline silica SiO_{2} and alumina Al_{2}O_{3}.

The mechanical properties of materials describe characteristics such as their strength and resistance to deformation. For example, steel beams are used in construction because of their high strength, meaning that they neither break nor bend significantly under the applied load.

Mechanical properties include elasticity, plasticity, tensile strength, compressive strength, shear strength, fracture toughness, ductility (low in brittle materials) and indentation hardness. Solid mechanics is the study of the behavior of solid matter under external actions such as external forces and temperature changes.

A solid does not exhibit macroscopic flow, as fluids do. Any degree of departure from its original shape is called deformation. The proportion of deformation to original size is called strain. If the applied stress is sufficiently low, almost all solid materials behave in such a way that the strain is directly proportional to the stress (Hooke's law). The coefficient of the proportion is called the modulus of elasticity or Young's modulus. This region of deformation is known as the linearly elastic region. Three models can describe how a solid responds to an applied stress:

- Elasticity – When an applied stress is removed, the material returns to its undeformed state.
- Viscoelasticity – These are materials that behave elastically, but also have damping. When the applied stress is removed, work has to be done against the damping effects and is converted to heat within the material. This results in a hysteresis loop in the stress–strain curve. This implies that the mechanical response has a time-dependence.
- Plasticity – Materials that behave elastically generally do so when the applied stress is less than a yield value. When the stress is greater than the yield stress, the material behaves plastically and does not return to its previous state. That is, irreversible plastic deformation (or viscous flow) occurs after yield that is permanent.

Many materials become weaker at high temperatures. Materials that retain their strength at high temperatures, called refractory materials, are useful for many purposes. For example, glass-ceramics have become extremely useful for countertop cooking, as they exhibit excellent mechanical properties and can sustain repeated and quick temperature changes up to 1000 °C. In the aerospace industry, high performance materials used in the design of aircraft and/or spacecraft exteriors must have a high resistance to thermal shock. Thus, synthetic fibers spun out of organic polymers and polymer/ceramic/metal composite materials and fiber-reinforced polymers are now being designed with this purpose in mind.

=== Thermal ===
Normal modes of atomic vibration in a crystalline solid

Because solids have thermal energy, their atoms vibrate about fixed mean positions within the ordered (or disordered) lattice. The spectrum of lattice vibrations in a crystalline or glassy network provides the foundation for the kinetic theory of solids. This motion occurs at the atomic level, and thus cannot be observed or detected without highly specialized equipment, such as that used in spectroscopy.

Thermal properties of solids include thermal conductivity, which is the property of a material that indicates its ability to conduct heat. Solids also have a specific heat capacity, which is the capacity of a material to store energy in the form of heat (or thermal lattice vibrations).

=== Electrical ===
Video of superconducting levitation of YBCO

Electrical properties include both electrical resistivity and conductivity, dielectric strength, electromagnetic permeability, and permittivity. Electrical conductors such as metals and alloys are contrasted with electrical insulators such as glasses and ceramics. Semiconductors behave somewhere in between. Whereas conductivity in metals is caused by electrons, both electrons and holes contribute to current in semiconductors. Alternatively, ions support electric current in ionic conductors.

Many materials also exhibit superconductivity at low temperatures; they include metallic elements such as tin and aluminium, various metallic alloys, some heavily doped semiconductors, and certain ceramics. The electrical resistivity of most electrical (metallic) conductors generally decreases gradually as the temperature is lowered, but remains finite. In a superconductor, however, the resistance drops abruptly to zero when the material is cooled below its critical temperature. An electric current flowing in a loop of superconducting wire can persist indefinitely with no power source.

A dielectric, or electrical insulator, is a substance that is highly resistant to the flow of electric current. A dielectric, such as plastic, tends to concentrate an applied electric field within itself, which property is used in capacitors. A capacitor is an electrical device that can store energy in the electric field between a pair of closely spaced conductors (called 'plates'). When voltage is applied to the capacitor, electric charges of equal magnitude, but opposite polarity, build up on each plate. Capacitors are used in electrical circuits as energy-storage devices, as well as in electronic filters to differentiate between high-frequency and low-frequency signals.

==== Electro-mechanical ====
Piezoelectricity is the ability of crystals to generate a voltage in response to an applied mechanical stress. The piezoelectric effect is reversible in that piezoelectric crystals, when subjected to an externally applied voltage, can change shape by a small amount. Polymer materials like rubber, wool, hair, wood fiber, and silk often behave as electrets. For example, the polymer polyvinylidene fluoride (PVDF) exhibits a piezoelectric response several times larger than the traditional piezoelectric material quartz (crystalline SiO_{2}). The deformation (~0.1%) lends itself to useful technical applications such as high-voltage sources, loudspeakers, lasers, as well as chemical, biological, and acousto-optic sensors and/or transducers.

=== Optical ===
Materials can transmit (e.g. glass) or reflect (e.g. metals) visible light.

Many materials will transmit some wavelengths while blocking others. For example, window glass is transparent to visible light, but much less so to most of the frequencies of ultraviolet light that cause sunburn. This property is used for frequency-selective optical filters, which can alter the color of incident light.

For some purposes, both the optical and mechanical properties of a material can be of interest. For example, the sensors on an infrared homing ("heat-seeking") missile must be protected by a cover that is transparent to infrared radiation. The current material of choice for high-speed infrared-guided missile domes is single-crystal sapphire. The optical transmission of sapphire does not actually extend to cover the entire mid-infrared range (3–5 μm), but starts to drop off at wavelengths greater than approximately 4.5 μm at room temperature. While the strength of sapphire is better than that of other available mid-range infrared dome materials at room temperature, it weakens above 600 °C. A long-standing trade-off exists between optical bandpass and mechanical durability; new materials such as transparent ceramics or optical nanocomposites may provide improved performance.

Guided lightwave transmission involves the field of fiber optics and the ability of certain glasses to transmit, simultaneously and with low loss of intensity, a range of frequencies (multi-mode optical waveguides) with little interference between them. Optical waveguides are used as components in integrated optical circuits or as the transmission medium in optical communication systems.

==== Opto-electronic ====
A solar cell or photovoltaic cell is a device that converts light energy into electrical energy. Fundamentally, the device needs to fulfill only two functions: photo-generation of charge carriers (electrons and holes) in a light-absorbing material, and separation of the charge carriers to a conductive contact that will transmit the electricity (simply put, carrying electrons off through a metal contact into an external circuit). This conversion is called the photoelectric effect, and the field of research related to solar cells is known as photovoltaics.

Solar cells have many applications. They have long been used in situations where electrical power from the grid is unavailable, such as in remote area power systems, Earth-orbiting satellites and space probes, handheld calculators, wrist watches, remote radiotelephones and water pumping applications. More recently, they are starting to be used in assemblies of solar modules (photovoltaic arrays) connected to the electricity grid through an inverter, that is not to act as a sole supply but as an additional electricity source.

All solar cells require a light absorbing material contained within the cell structure to absorb photons and generate electrons via the photovoltaic effect. The materials used in solar cells tend to have the property of preferentially absorbing the wavelengths of solar light that reach the earth surface. Some solar cells are optimized for light absorption beyond Earth's atmosphere, as well.

== Fields of study ==
=== Solid-state physics ===
Solid-state physics is the study of rigid matter, or solids, through methods such as solid-state chemistry, quantum mechanics, crystallography, electromagnetism, and metallurgy. It is the largest branch of condensed matter physics. Solid-state physics studies how the large-scale properties of solid materials result from their atomic-scale properties. Thus, solid-state physics forms a theoretical basis of materials science. Along with solid-state chemistry, it also has direct applications in the technology of transistors and semiconductors.

=== Solid-state chemistry ===
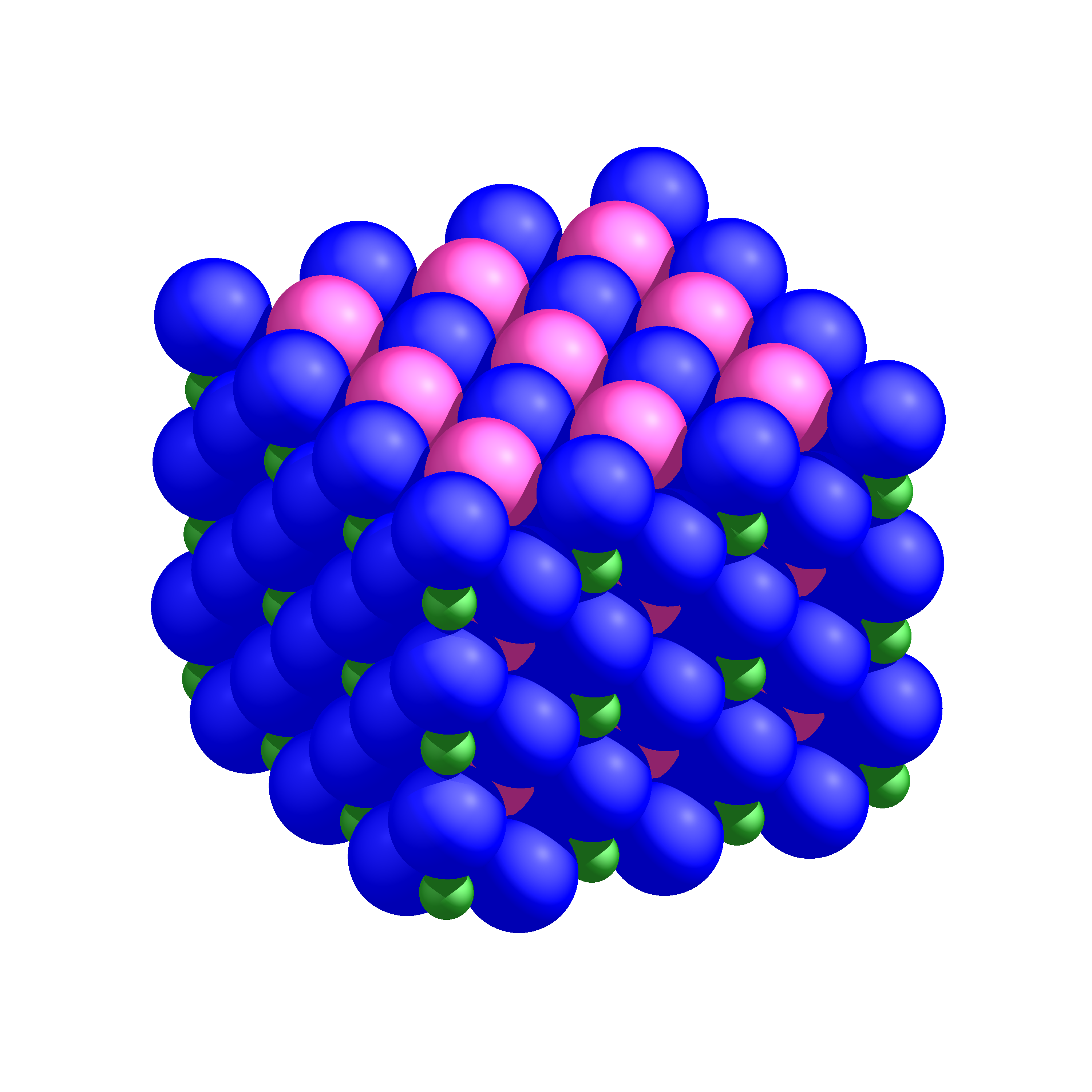
A perovskite-type oxide crystalline structure, (Sr_{1-2x}Na_{x}La_{x})TiO_{3}, showing a cubic arrangement of oxide anions (O^{2-}, blue) and large cations (Sr^{2+}, violet), with titanium (Ti^{4+}, green) occupying octahedral voids.

Solid-state chemistry, also referred to as materials chemistry, is the study of the synthesis, structure, and properties of solid phase materials. It therefore has a strong overlap with solid-state physics, mineralogy, crystallography, ceramics, metallurgy, thermodynamics, materials science and electronics with a focus on the synthesis of novel materials and their characterization. A diverse range of synthetic techniques, such as the ceramic method and chemical vapour deposition, make solid-state materials. Solids can be classified as crystalline or amorphous on basis of the nature of order present in the arrangement of their constituent particles. Their elemental compositions, microstructures, and physical properties can be characterized through a variety of analytical methods.

=== Materials science ===
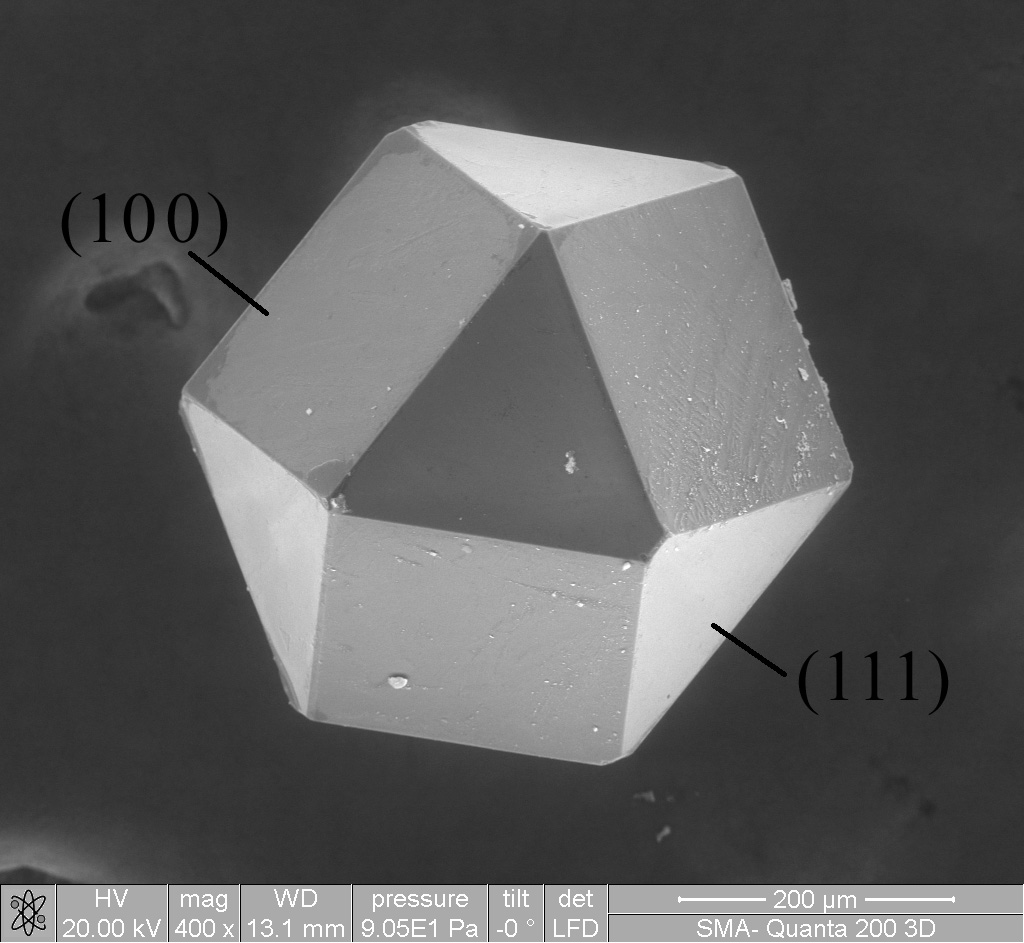
A diamond cuboctahedron showing seven crystallographic planes, imaged with scanning electron microscopy

Six classes of conventional engineering materials

Materials science is an interdisciplinary field concerned with understanding the relationships between the structure of materials and their properties and using this knowledge to design materials for specific applications. The internal structure of a material—from atomic arrangements to microscopic features—strongly influences its mechanical, electrical, thermal, and optical behavior. In engineering practice, materials science and engineering are often described through the processing–structure–properties–performance paradigm, in which processing determines structure, structure determines properties, and properties ultimately control the performance of a material in service.

The intellectual origins of materials science stem from the Age of Enlightenment, when researchers began to use analytical thinking from chemistry, physics, and engineering to understand ancient, phenomenological observations in metallurgy and mineralogy. Materials science still incorporates elements of physics, chemistry, and engineering. As such, the field was long considered by academic institutions as a sub-field of these related fields. Beginning in the 1940s, materials science began to be more widely recognized as a specific and distinct field of science and engineering, and major technical universities around the world created dedicated schools for its study.

By studying how the history of a material (processing) influences its structure, properties, and performance, materials scientists have made many contributions to new technologies in biomaterials, metallurgy, and nanotechnology. Materials science is also used by forensic engineers and failure analysts to understand why and how critical components fail, which helps prevent dangerous and costly accidents in areas such as aviation.

Phase transitions of matter
To From	Solid	Liquid	Gas	Plasma
Solid		Melting	Sublimation	ablation
Liquid	Freezing		Vaporization	
Gas	Deposition	Condensation		Ionization
Plasma			Recombination	
