= Aluminium oxynitride =

Transparent ceramic material

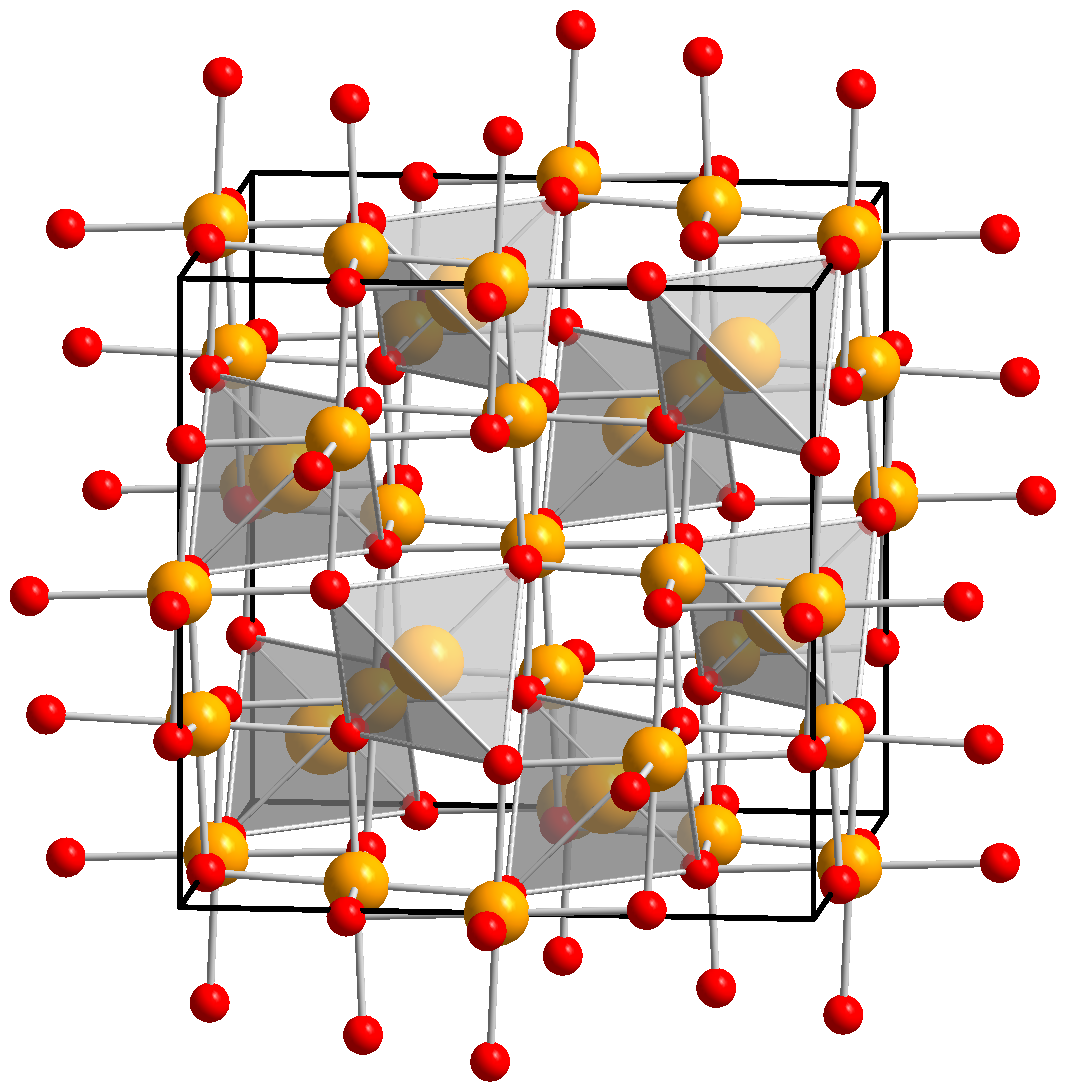
- Spinel structure of ALON

Names
- Systematic IUPAC name Aluminium oxynitride

Identifiers
CAS Number	12633-97-5
3D model (JSmol)	x = 1/3: Interactive image
Abbreviations	ALON
CompTox Dashboard (EPA)	DTXSID301045793
- InChI: x = 1/3: InChI=1S/5Al.N.6O/q5*+3;-3;6*-2 Key: MYGVALNIOXMRLJ-UHFFFAOYSA-N
- SMILES: x = 1/3: [Al+3].[Al+3].[Al+3].[Al+3].[Al+3].[N-3].[O-2].[O-2].[O-2].[O-2].[O-2].[O-2]

Properties
Chemical formula	(AlN)_{x}·(Al_{2}O_{3})_{1−x}, 0.30 ≤ x ≤ 0.37
Appearance	White or transparent solid
Density	3.691–3.696 g/cm^{3}
Melting point	~2150 °C
Solubility in water	insoluble
Refractive index (n_{D})	1.79

Structure
Crystal structure	cubic spinel
Lattice constant	a = 794.6 pm
- Except where otherwise noted, data are given for materials in their standard state (at 25 °C [77 °F], 100 kPa). verify (what is ?) Infobox references

Aluminium oxynitride (marketed under the name ALON by Surmet Corporation) is a transparent ceramic composed of aluminium oxide and aluminium nitride in varying amounts. Aluminium oxynitride is optically transparent (≥80% for 2 mm thickness) in the near-ultraviolet, visible, and mid-wave-infrared regions of the electromagnetic spectrum. It is four times as hard as fused silica glass, the same mohs hardness (9) as sapphire, and nearly 115% as hard as magnesium aluminate spinel. It can be fabricated into transparent windows, plates, domes, rods, tubes, and other forms using conventional ceramic powder processing techniques.

Aluminium oxynitride is the hardest polycrystalline transparent ceramic available commercially. Because of its relatively low weight, distinctive optical and mechanical properties, and resistance to oxidation or radiation, it shows promise for applications such as bulletproof, blast-resistant, and optoelectronic windows. Aluminium oxynitride–based armor has been shown to stop multiple armor-piercing projectiles of up to .50 BMG.

== Properties ==
Aluminium oxynitride is resistant to various acids, bases, and water.

=== Mechanical ===
Aluminium oxynitride has the following mechanical properties:

- Compressive strength 2.68 GPa
- Flexural strength 0.38–0.7 GPa
- Fracture toughness 2.0 MPa·m^{1/2}
- Knoop hardness 1800 kg/mm^{2} (0.2 kg load)
- Poisson ratio 0.24
- Shear modulus 135 GPa
- Young's modulus 334 GPa

=== Thermal and optical ===
Aluminium oxynitride has the following thermal and optical properties:

- Specific heat 0.781 J/(g·K)
- Thermal conductivity 12.3 W/(m·K)
- Thermal expansion coefficient ~4.7×10^{−6}/K
- Transparency range 200–5000 nm

== Applications ==
Aluminium oxynitride is used for infrared-optical windows, with greater than 80% transparency for 2 mm thickness at wavelengths below about 4 micrometers, dropping to near zero at about 6 micrometers. It has also been demonstrated as an interface passivation layer in some semiconductor-related applications.

Aluminium oxynitride has less than half the weight and thickness of glass-based transparent armor. Aluminium oxynitride armor of 1.6-inch (41 mm) thickness is capable of stopping .50 BMG armor-piercing rounds, which can penetrate 3.7 inches (94 mm) of traditional glass laminate.

In 2005, the United States Air Force began testing aluminium-oxynitride-based armor.

== Manufacture ==
Aluminium oxynitride can be fabricated as windows, plates, domes, rods, tubes and other forms using conventional ceramic powder processing techniques. Its composition can vary slightly: the AlN content ranges from about 30 to 36 mol%, which has been reported to affect the bulk and shear moduli by only 1–2%. The fabricated greenware is subjected to heat treatment (densification) at elevated temperatures followed by grinding and polishing to transparency. It can withstand temperatures of about 2,100 °C (2,370 K) in inert atmospheres. The grinding and polishing substantially improves the impact resistance and other mechanical properties of armor.

== Patents ==
Patents related to aluminium oxynitride include:

- Aluminium oxynitride having improved optical characteristics and method of manufacture TM Hartnett, RL Gentilman U.S. patent 4,481,300, 1984
- Process for producing polycrystalline cubic aluminium oxynitride JW McCauley U.S. patent 4,241,000, 1980
- Transparent aluminium oxynitride and method of manufacture RL Gentilman, EA Maguire U.S. patent 4,520,116, 1985; U.S. patent 4,720,362, 1988
- Transparent aluminium oxynitride-based ceramic article JP Mathers U.S. patent 5,231,062, 1993

== See also ==
- Aluminium nitride
- Corundum
- Transparent aluminum (material in Star Trek)
- Transparent ceramics
