= Yttralox =

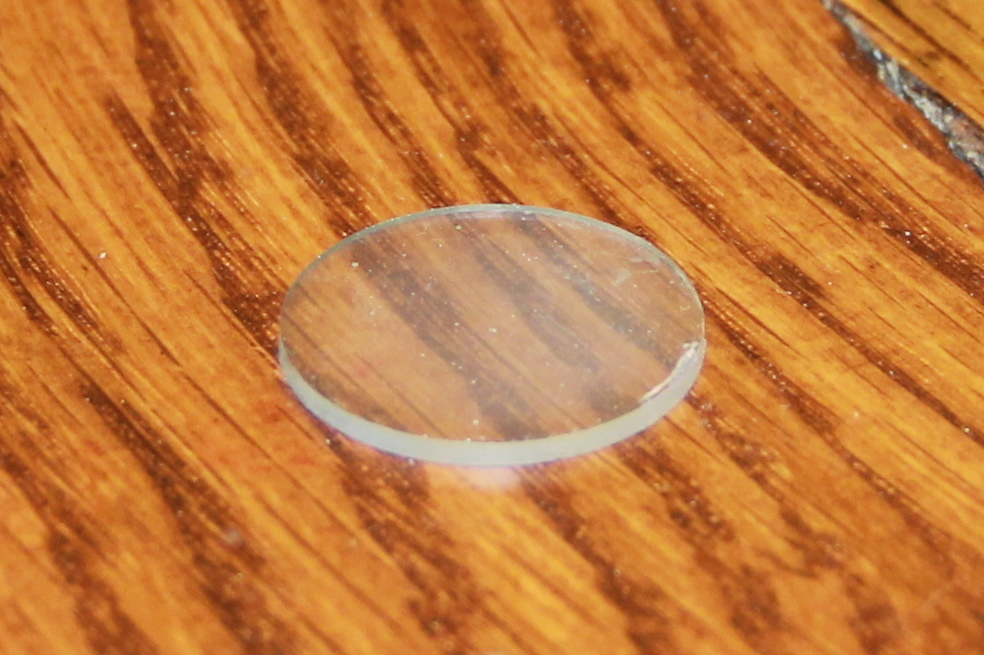
A disc of Yttralox on a table

Yttralox is a transparent ceramic consisting of yttria (Y_{2}O_{3}) containing approximately 10% thorium dioxide (ThO_{2}). It was one of the first transparent ceramics produced, and was invented in 1966 by Richard C. Anderson at the General Electric Research Laboratory while sintering mixtures of rare earth minerals.

== Properties ==
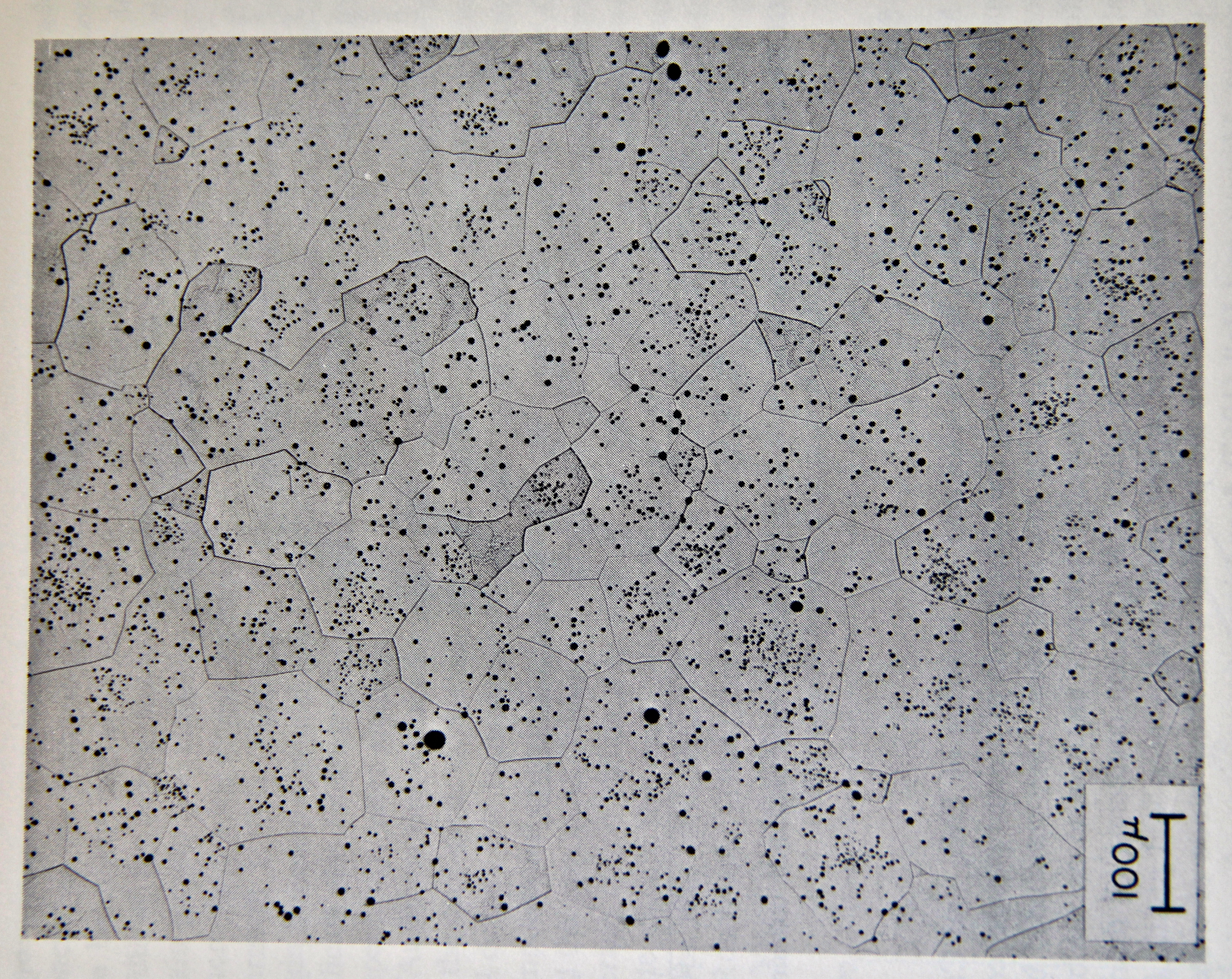
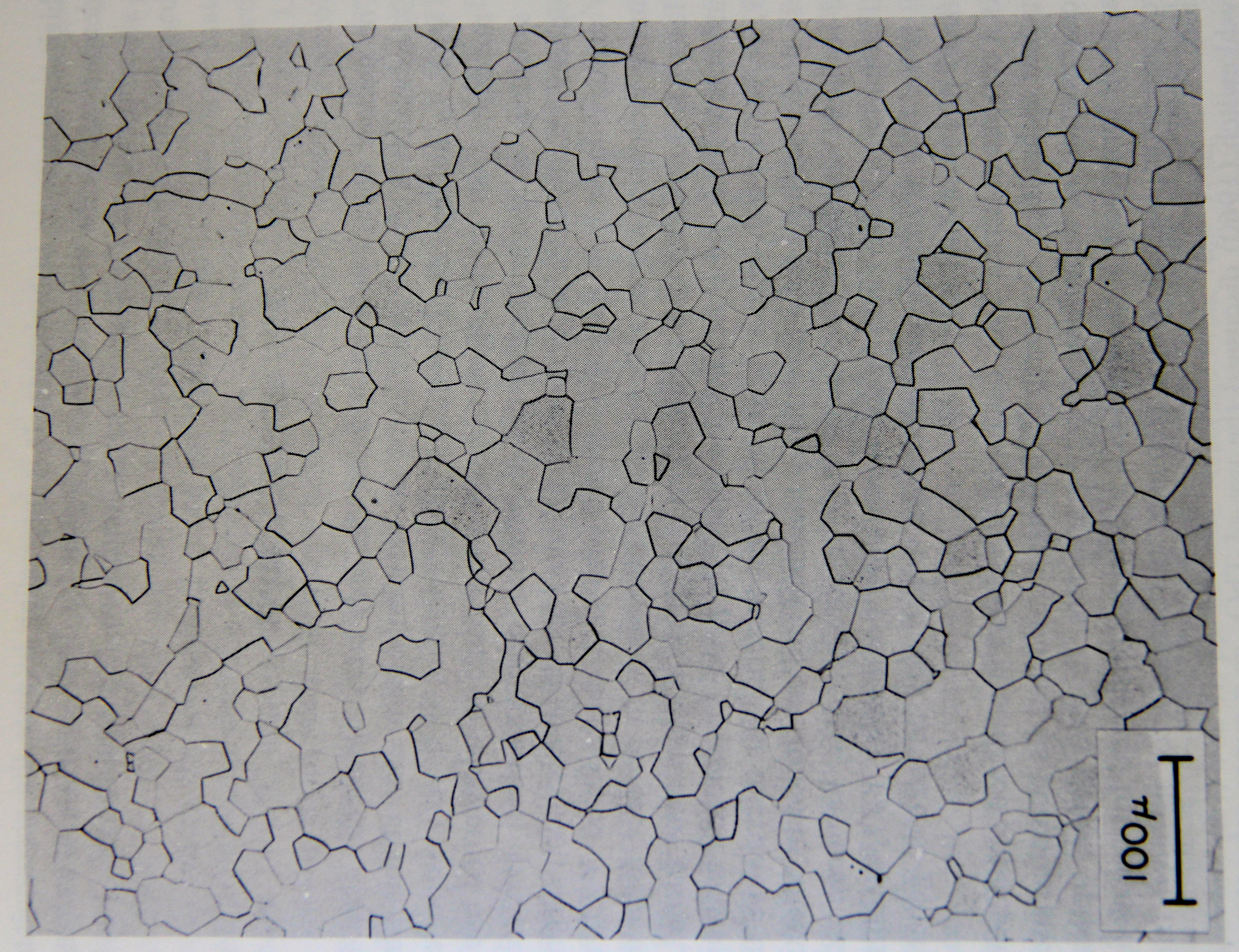
Sintering of pure Yttria leads to discontinuous grain growth and pores (left), while Yttralox has a more uniform grain size and no pores (right).

Yttralox is a solid solution of thorium dioxide in yttria. The thorium dioxide additive affects the growth of grains during densification, leading to improved optical transparency. Uncontrolled grain growth allows a few grains to grow larger than the others, trapping pores inside them. The additive increases the grain boundary hardness more than the internal grain hardness. This causes porosity to remain on grain boundaries rather than becoming trapped inside grains, allowing them to be eliminated later in the sintering process. This greatly improves the material's optical transparency, because porosity causes light scattering. Porosities as low as one part per million were reported. The resulting grain size was in the range 10–50 μm.

Yttralox was marketed as being "transparent as glass", has a melting point twice as high, and transmits frequencies in the near infrared band as well as visible light. However, it has little plasticity at high temperatures and low thermal conductivity, giving it a thermal shock performance little better than common glass.

== Uses ==
Commercialization was limited because Yttralox required high sintering temperatures of 2000–2200°C. Yttralox was proposed for use in lamp envelopes and high-temperature windows and lenses. It was investigated for use as a low-loss window material for lasers, for example in conjunction with a laser Doppler velocimeter for ramjet research. It was also investigated for use with infrared equipment in missiles. Neodymium oxide–doped Yttralox was used as a proof of concept for laser gain in a polycrystalline oxide ceramic, but was not commercialized due to low efficiency.

Yttralox's competing materials were an yttria containing lanthanum oxide manufactured by GTE, and a pure yttria material manufactured by Raytheon.

== History ==
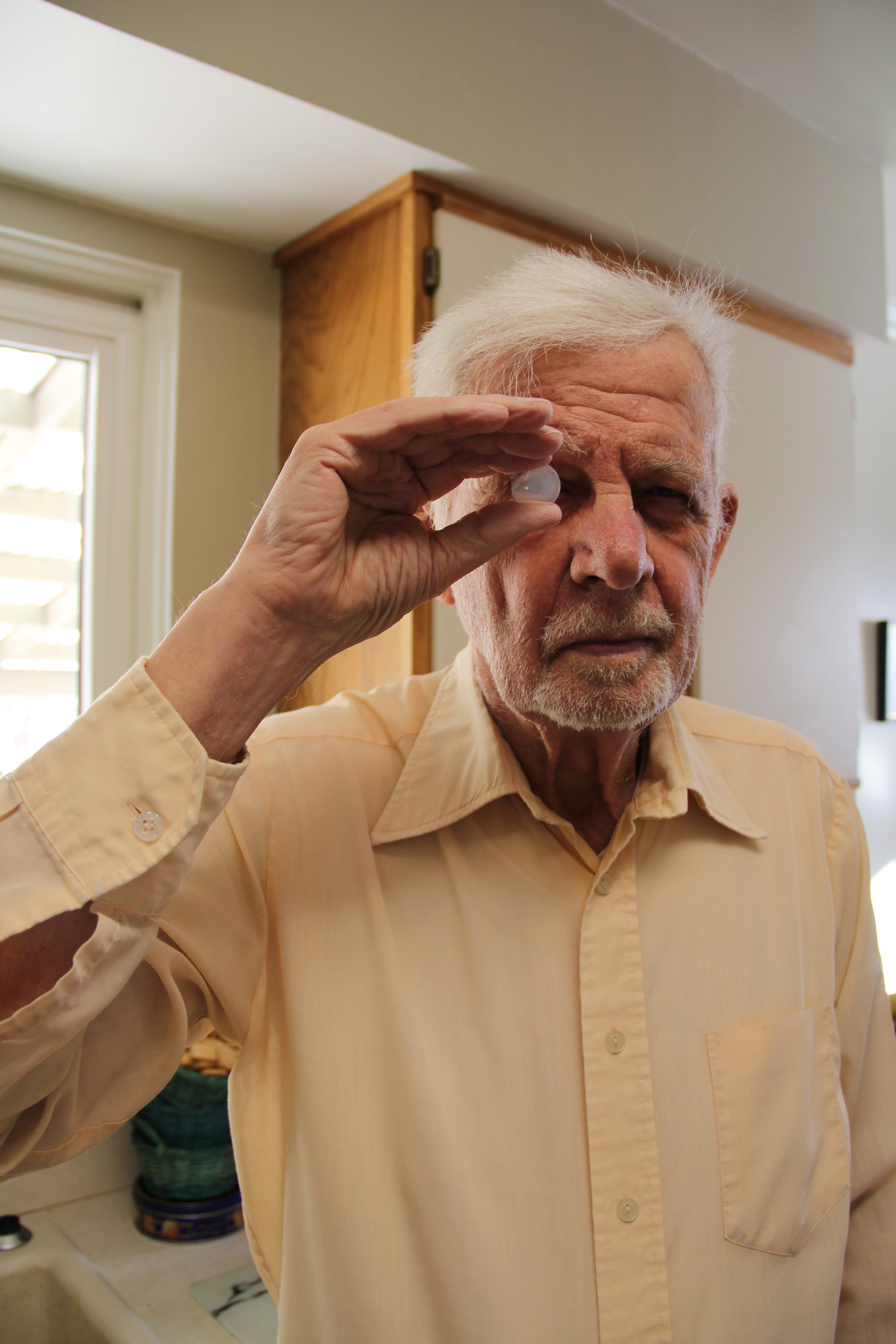
Richard C. Anderson, the inventor of Yttralox, holding an Yttralox disc

Yttralox was invented in 1966 by Richard C. Anderson at the General Electric Research Laboratory while sintering mixtures of rare earth minerals. The initial objective of the research was to develop ionic conductors for fuel cells using yttria–zirconium dioxide materials. Although the zirconium dioxide-rich versions were of more interest for ionic conductors, the yttria-rich versions unexpectedly produced transparent samples. Further research established that other oxides of Group 4 elements, thorium dioxide and hafnium dioxide, were also effective at producing transparent yttria, and the thorium dioxide system became the most extensively studied. Further work at GE was performed by Paul J. Jorgensen, Joseph H. Rosolowski, and Douglas St. Pierre. Fabrication of Yttralox was reported by Greskovich and Woods.

As of 1982, Yttralox was no longer being produced.
