= Transparent ceramics =

Ceramic materials that are optically transparent

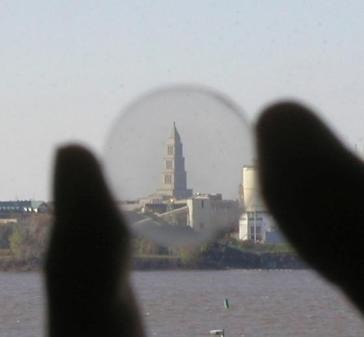
Transparent spinel (MgAl_{2}O_{4}) ceramic is used traditionally for applications such as high-energy laser windows because of its excellent transmission in visible wavelengths and mid-wavelength infrared (0.2–5.0 μm) when combined with selected materials – source: U.S. Naval Research Laboratory

Many ceramic materials, both glassy and crystalline, have found use as optically transparent materials in various forms: bulk solid-state components (phone glass), high surface area forms such as thin films, coatings, and fibers.

Ceramics have found widespread use for various applications in the electro-optical field including:

- optical fibers for guided lightwave transmission
- optical switches
- laser amplifiers and lenses
- hosts for solid-state lasers
- optical window materials for gas lasers
- infrared (IR) heat seeking devices for missile guidance systems
- IR night vision.

Optical transparency in materials is limited by the amount of light that is scattered by their microstructural features with the amount of light scattering depending on the wavelength of the incident radiation, or light. For example, since visible light has a wavelength scale on the order of hundreds of nanometers, scattering centers will have dimensions on a similar spatial scale.

Most ceramic materials, such as those made of alumina, are formed from fine powders, yielding a fine grained polycrystalline microstructure filled with scattering centers comparable in size to the wavelength of visible light. Thus, they are generally opaque as opposed to transparent materials. In contrast, single-crystalline ceramics may be manufactured largely defect-free (particularly within the spatial scale of the incident light wave), offering nearly 99% optical transparency. Polycrystalline transparent ceramics based on alumina Al_{2}O_{3}, yttrium aluminium garnet (YAG), and neodymium-doped Nd:YAG were made possible by early 2000s nanoscale technology.

== Introduction ==
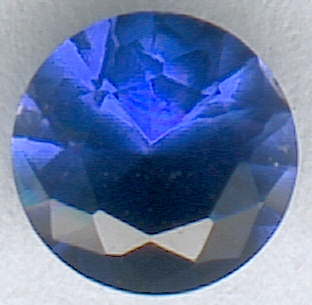
Synthetic sapphire – single-crystal aluminum oxide (sapphire – Al_{2}O_{3}) is a transparent ceramic

Transparent ceramics have recently acquired a high degree of interest and notoriety. Basic applications include lasers and cutting tools, transparent armor windows, night vision devices (NVD), and nose cones for heat seeking missiles. Currently available infrared (IR) transparent materials typically exhibit a trade-off between optical performance and mechanical strength. For example, sapphire (crystalline alumina) is very strong, but lacks full transparency throughout the 3–5 micrometer mid-IR range. Yttria is fully transparent from 3–5 micrometers, but lacks sufficient strength, hardness, and thermal shock resistance for high-performance aerospace applications. Not surprisingly, a combination of these two materials in the form of the yttria-alumina garnet (YAG) has proven to be one of the top performers in the field.

In 1961, General Electric began selling transparent alumina Lucalox bulbs. In 1966, GE announced a ceramic "transparent as glass", called Yttralox. In 2004, Anatoly Rosenflanz and colleagues at 3M used a "flame-spray" technique to alloy aluminium oxide (or alumina) with rare-earth metal oxides in order to produce high strength glass-ceramics with good optical properties. The method avoids many of the problems encountered in conventional glass forming and may be extensible to other oxides. This goal has been readily accomplished and amply demonstrated in laboratories and research facilities worldwide using the emerging chemical processing methods encompassed by the methods of sol–gel chemistry and nanotechnology.

Many ceramic materials, both glassy and crystalline, have found use as hosts for solid-state lasers and as optical window materials for gas lasers. The first working laser was made by Theodore H. Maiman in 1960 at Hughes Research Laboratories in Malibu, who had the edge on other research teams led by Charles H. Townes at Columbia University, Arthur Schawlow at Bell Labs, and Gould at TRG (Technical Research Group). Maiman used a solid-state light-pumped synthetic ruby to produce red laser light at a wavelength of 694 nanometers (nm). Synthethic ruby lasers are still in use. Both sapphires and rubies are corundum, a crystalline form of aluminium oxide (Al_{2}O_{3}).

=== Crystals ===
Ruby lasers consist of single-crystal sapphire alumina (Al_{2}O_{3}) rods doped with a small concentration of chromium Cr, typically in the range of 0.05%. The end faces are highly polished with a planar and parallel configuration. Neodymium-doped YAG (Nd:YAG) has proven to be one of the best solid-state laser materials. Its indisputable dominance in a broad variety of laser applications is determined by a combination of high emission cross section with long spontaneous emission lifetime, high damage threshold, mechanical strength, thermal conductivity, and low thermal beam distortion. The fact that the Czochralski crystal growth of Nd:YAG is a matured, highly reproducible and relatively simple technological procedure adds significantly to the value of the material.

Nd:YAG lasers are used in manufacturing for engraving, etching, or marking a variety of metals and plastics. They are extensively used in manufacturing for cutting and welding steel and various alloys. For automotive applications (cutting and welding steel) the power levels are typically 1–5 kW. In addition, Nd:YAG lasers are used in ophthalmology to correct posterior capsular opacification, a condition that may occur after cataract surgery, and for peripheral iridotomy in patients with acute angle-closure glaucoma, where it has superseded surgical iridectomy. Frequency-doubled Nd:YAG lasers (wavelength 532 nm) are used for pan-retinal photocoagulation in patients with diabetic retinopathy. In oncology, Nd:YAG lasers can be used to remove skin cancers. These lasers are also used extensively in the field of cosmetic medicine for laser hair removal and the treatment of minor vascular defects such as spider veins on the face and legs. Recently used for dissecting cellulitis, a rare skin disease usually occurring on the scalp. Using hysteroscopy in the field of gynecology, the Nd:YAG laser has been used for removal of uterine septa within the inside of the uterus. In dentistry, Nd:YAG lasers are used for soft tissue surgeries in the oral cavity.

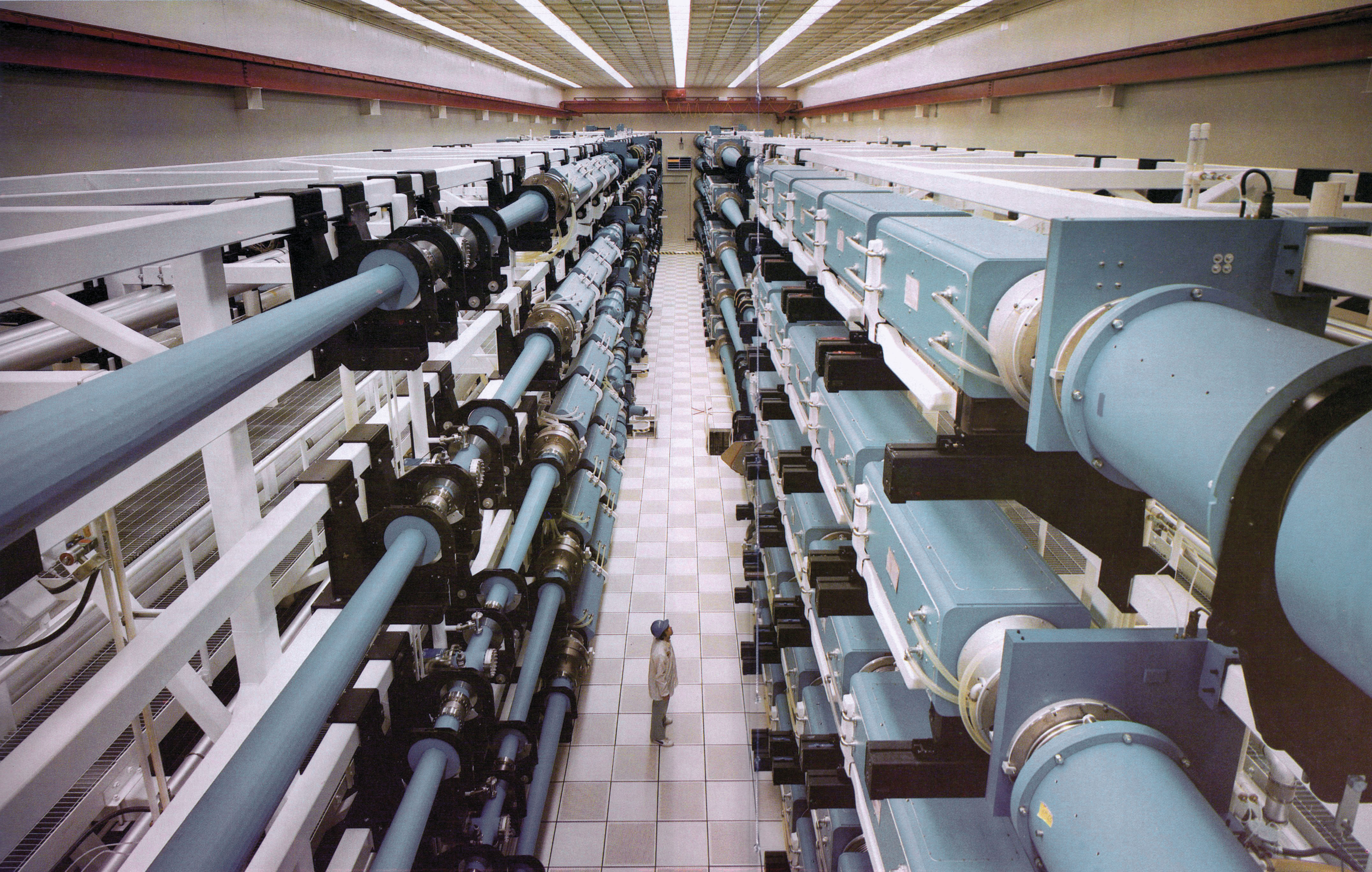
Currently, high powered Nd:glass lasers as large as a football field are used for inertial confinement fusion, nuclear weapons research, and other high energy density physics experiments

=== Glasses ===
Glasses (non-crystalline ceramics) also are used widely as host materials for lasers. Relative to crystalline lasers, they offer improved flexibility in size and shape and may be readily manufactured as large, homogeneous, isotropic solids with excellent optical properties. The indices of refraction of glass laser hosts may be varied between approximately 1.5 and 2.0, and both the temperature coefficient of n and the strain-optical coefficient may be tailored by altering the chemical composition. Glasses have lower thermal conductivities than the alumina or YAG, however, which imposes limitations on their use in continuous and high repetition-rate applications.

The principal differences between the behavior of glass and crystalline ceramic laser host materials are associated with the greater variation in the local environment of lasing ions in amorphous solids. This leads to a broadening of the fluorescent levels in glasses. For example, the width of the Nd^{3+} emission in YAG is ~ 10 angstroms as compared to ~ 300 angstroms in typical oxide glasses. The broadened fluorescent lines in glasses make it more difficult to obtain continuous wave laser operation (CW), relative to the same lasing ions in crystalline solid laser hosts.

Several glasses are used in transparent armor, such as normal plate glass (soda-lime-silica), borosilicate glass, and fused silica. Plate glass has been the most common glass used due to its low cost. But greater requirements for the optical properties and ballistic performance have necessitated the development of new materials. Chemical or thermal treatments can increase the strength of glasses, and the controlled crystallization of certain glass compositions can produce optical quality glass-ceramics. Alstom Grid Ltd. currently produces a lithium di-silicate based glass-ceramic known as TransArm, for use in transparent armor systems. It has all the workability of an amorphous glass, but upon recrystallization it demonstrates properties similar to a crystalline ceramic. Vycor is 96% fused silica glass, which is crystal clear, lightweight and high strength. One advantage of these types of materials is that they can be produced in large sheets and other curved shapes.

=== Nanomaterials ===
It has been shown fairly recently that laser elements (amplifiers, switches, ion hosts, etc.) made from fine-grained ceramic nanomaterials—produced by the low temperature sintering of high purity nanoparticles and powders—can be produced at a relatively low cost. These components are free of internal stress or intrinsic birefringence, and allow relatively large doping levels or optimized custom-designed doping profiles. This highlights the use of ceramic nanomaterials as being particularly important for high-energy laser elements and applications.

Primary scattering centers in polycrystalline nanomaterials—made from the sintering of high purity nanoparticles and powders—include microstructural defects such as residual porosity and grain boundaries (see Transparent materials). Thus, opacity partly results from the incoherent scattering of light at internal surfaces and interfaces. In addition to porosity, most of the interfaces or internal surfaces in ceramic nanomaterials are in the form of grain boundaries which separate nanoscale regions of crystalline order. Moreover, when the size of the scattering center (or grain boundary) is reduced well below the size of the wavelength of the light being scattered, the light scattering no longer occurs to any significant extent.

In the processing of high performance ceramic nanomaterials with superior opto-mechanical properties under adverse conditions, the size of the crystalline grains is determined largely by the size of the crystalline particles present in the raw material during the synthesis or formation of the object. Thus a reduction of the original particle size well below the wavelength of visible light (~ 0.5 μm or 500 nm) eliminates much of the light scattering, resulting in a translucent or even transparent material.

Furthermore, results indicate that microscopic pores in sintered ceramic nanomaterials, mainly trapped at the junctions of microcrystalline grains, cause light to scatter and prevented true transparency. It has been observed that the total volume fraction of these nanoscale pores (both intergranular and intragranular porosity) must be less than 1% for high-quality optical transmission, i.e. the density has to be 99.99% of the theoretical crystalline density.

== Lasers ==
=== Nd:YAG ===
For example, a 1.46 kW Nd:YAG laser has been demonstrated by Konoshima Chemical Co. in Japan. In addition, Livermore researchers realized that these fine-grained ceramic nanomaterials might greatly benefit high-powered lasers used in the National Ignition Facility (NIF) Programs Directorate. In particular, a Livermore research team began to acquire advanced transparent nanomaterials from Konoshima to determine if they could meet the optical requirements needed for Livermore's Solid-State Heat Capacity Laser (SSHCL). Livermore researchers have also been testing applications of these materials for applications such as advanced drivers for laser-driven fusion power plants.

Assisted by several workers from the NIF, the Livermore team has produced 15 mm diameter samples of transparent Nd:YAG from nanoscale particles and powders, and determined the most important parameters affecting their quality. In these objects, the team largely followed the Japanese production and processing methodologies, and used an in house furnace to vacuum sinter the nanopowders. All specimens were then sent out for hot isostatic pressing (HIP). Finally, the components were returned to Livermore for coating and testing, with results indicating exceptional optical quality and properties.

One Japanese/East Indian consortium has focused specifically on the spectroscopic and stimulated emission characteristics of Nd^{3+} in transparent YAG nanomaterials for laser applications. Their materials were synthesized using vacuum sintering techniques. The spectroscopic studies suggest overall improvement in absorption and emission and reduction in scattering loss. Scanning electron microscope and transmission electron microscope observations revealed an excellent optical quality with low pore volume and narrow grain boundary width. Fluorescence and Raman measurements reveal that the Nd^{3+} doped YAG nanomaterial is comparable in quality to its single-crystal counterpart in both its radiative and non-radiative properties. Individual Stark levels are obtained from the absorption and fluorescence spectra and are analyzed in order to identify the stimulated emission channels possible in the material. Laser performance studies favor the use of high dopant concentration in the design of an efficient microchip laser. With 4 at% dopant, the group obtained a slope efficiency of 40%. High-power laser experiments yield an optical-to-optical conversion efficiency of 30% for Nd (0.6 at%) YAG nanomaterial as compared to 34% for an Nd (0.6 at%) YAG single crystal. Optical gain measurements conducted in these materials also show values comparable to single crystal, supporting the contention that these materials could be suitable substitutes to single crystals in solid-state laser applications.

=== Yttria, Y_{2}O_{3} ===
The initial work in developing transparent yttrium oxide nanomaterials was carried out by General Electric in the 1960s.

In 1966, a transparent ceramic, Yttralox, was invented by Dr. Richard C. Anderson at the General Electric Research Laboratory, with further work at GE's Metallurgy and Ceramics Laboratory by Drs. Paul J. Jorgensen, Joseph H. Rosolowski, and Douglas St. Pierre. Yttralox is "transparent as glass", has a melting point twice as high, and transmits frequencies in the near infrared band as well as visible light.

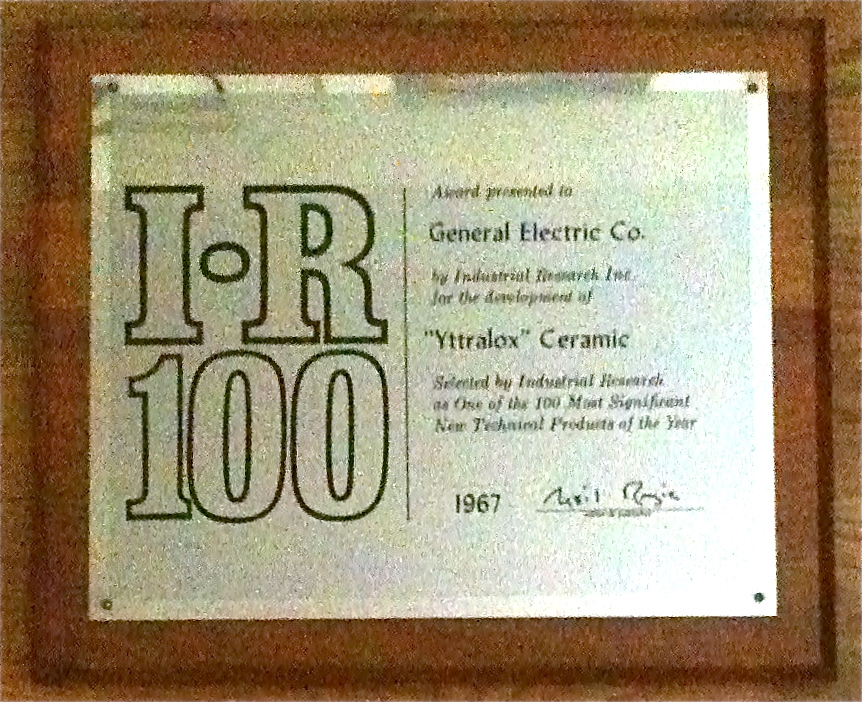
IR 100 Award, Yttralox, 1967

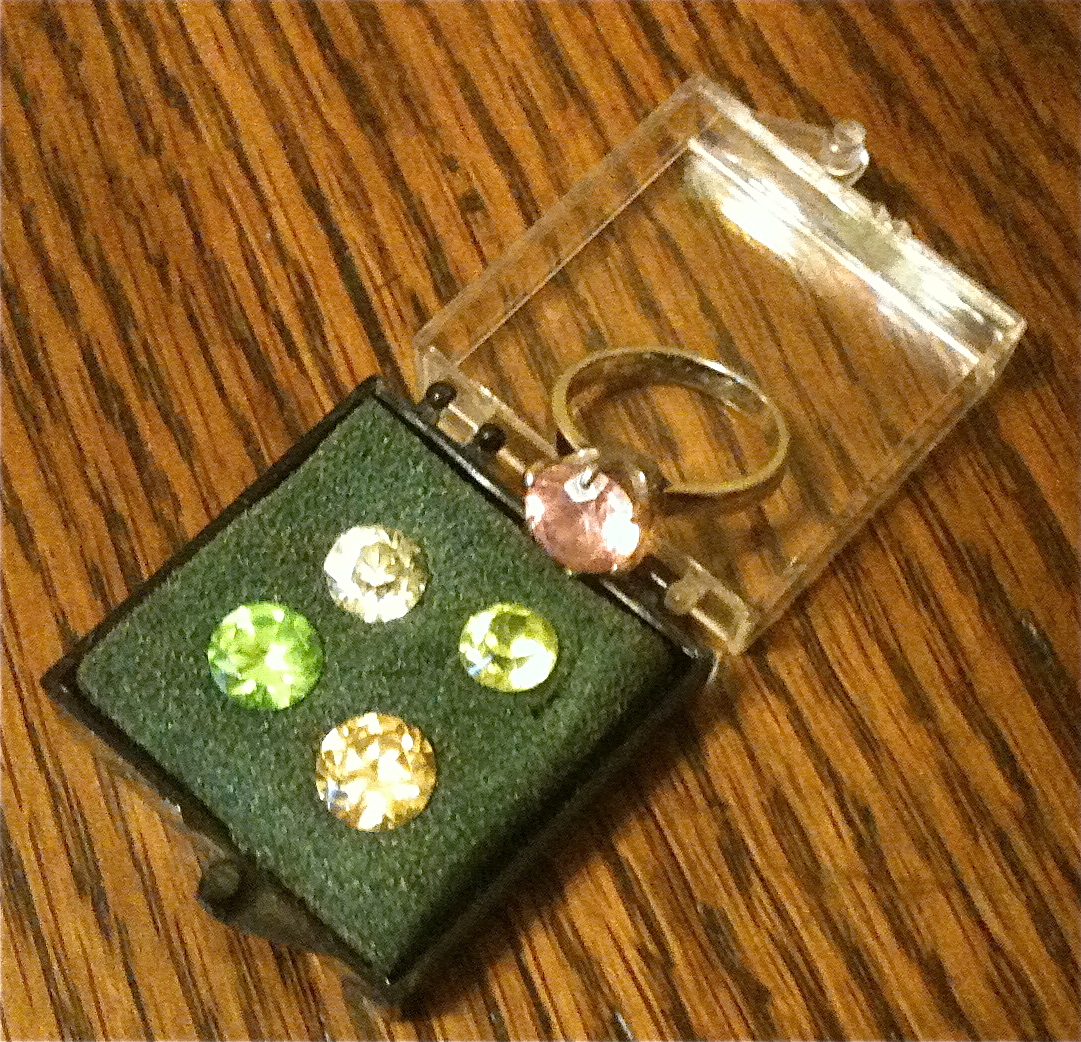
Gemstones of Yttralox transparent ceramic

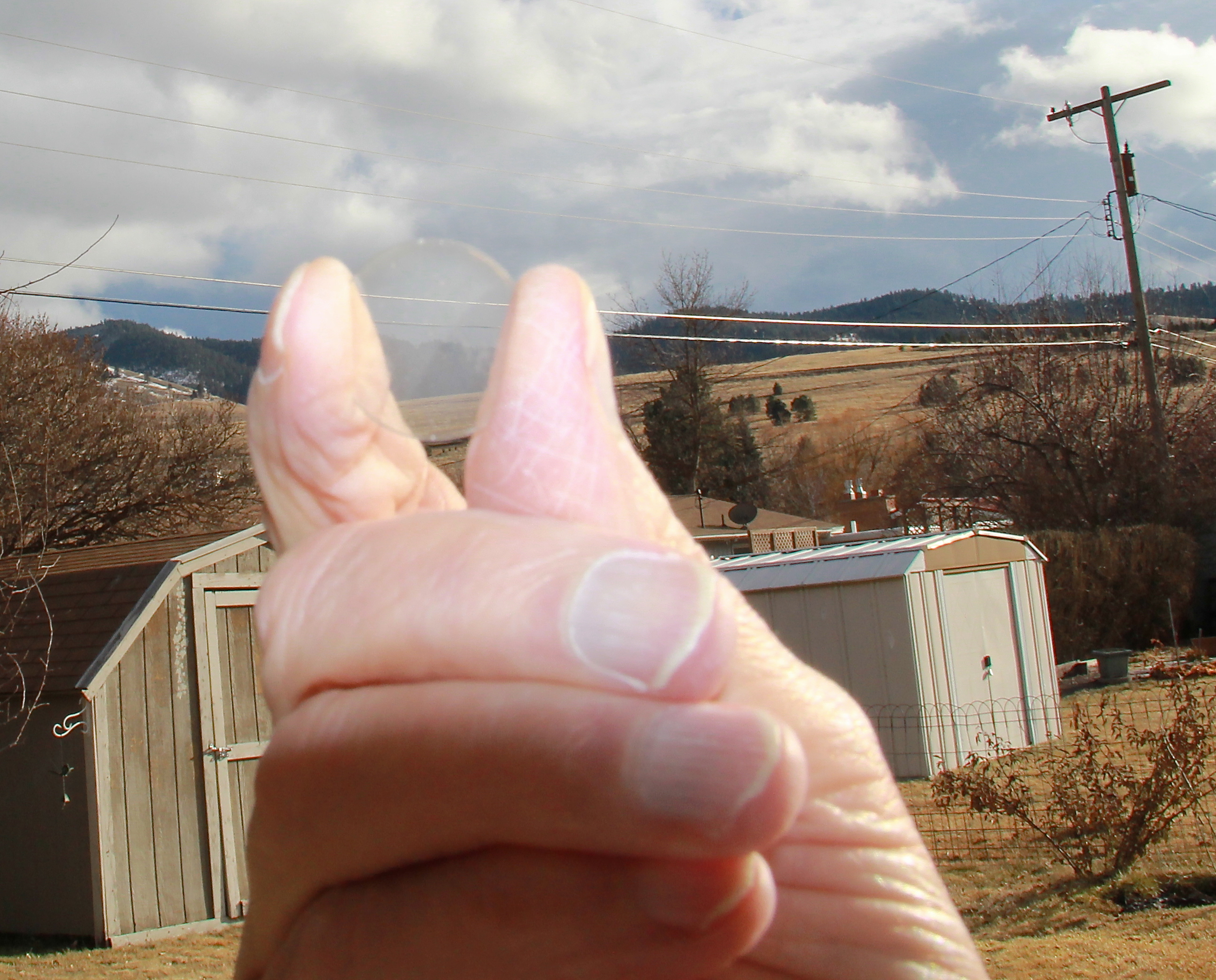
Richard C. Anderson holding a sample of Yttralox

Further development of yttrium ceramic nanomaterials was carried out by General Electric in the 1970s in Schenectady and Cleveland, motivated by lighting and ceramic laser applications. Yttralox, transparent yttrium oxide Y_{2}O_{3} containing ~ 10% thorium oxide (ThO_{2}) was fabricated by Greskovich and Woods. The additive served to control grain growth during densification, so that porosity remained on grain boundaries and not trapped inside grains where it would be quite difficult to eliminate during the initial stages of sintering. Typically, as polycrystalline ceramics densify during heat treatment, grains grow in size while the remaining porosity decreases both in volume fraction and in size. Optically transparent ceramics must be virtually pore-free.

GE's transparent Yttralox was followed by GTE's lanthana-doped yttria with similar level of additive. Both of these materials required extended firing times at temperatures above 2000 °C. La_{2}O_{3} – doped Y_{2}O_{3} is of interest for infrared (IR) applications because it is one of the longest wavelength transmitting oxides. It is refractory with a melting point of 2430 °C and has a moderate coefficient of thermal expansion. The thermal shock and erosion resistance is considered to be intermediate among the oxides, but outstanding compared to non-oxide IR transmitting materials. A major consideration is the low emissivity of yttria, which limits background radiation upon heating. It is also known that the phonon edge gradually moves to shorter wavelengths as a material is heated.

In addition, yttria itself, Y_{2}O_{3} has been clearly identified as a prospective solid-state laser material. In particular, lasers with ytterbium as dopant allow the efficient operation both in cw operation and in pulsed regimes.

At high concentration of excitations (of order of 1%) and poor cooling, the quenching of emission at laser frequency and avalanche broadband emission takes place.

=== Future ===
The Livermore team is also exploring new ways to chemically synthesize the initial nanopowders. Borrowing on expertise developed in CMS over the past 5 years, the team is synthesizing nanopowders based on sol–gel processing, and then sintering them accordingly in order to obtain the solid-state laser components. Another technique being tested utilizes a combustion process in order to generate the powders by burning an organic solid containing yttrium, aluminum, and neodymium. The smoke is then collected, which consists of spherical nanoparticles.

The Livermore team is also exploring new forming techniques (e.g. extrusion molding) which have the capacity to create more diverse, and possibly more complicated, shapes. These include shells and tubes for improved coupling to the pump light and for more efficient heat transfer. In addition, different materials can be co-extruded and then sintered into a monolithic transparent solid. An amplifier slab can be formed so that part of the structure acts in guided lightwave transmission in order to focus pump light from laser diodes into regions with a high concentration of dopant ions near the slab center.

In general, nanomaterials promise to greatly expand the availability of low-cost, high-end laser components in much larger sizes than would be possible with traditional single crystalline ceramics. Many classes of laser designs could benefit from nanomaterial-based laser structures such as amplifies with built-in edge claddings. Nanomaterials could also provide more robust and compact designs for high-peak power, fusion-class lasers for stockpile stewardship, as well as high-average-power lasers for global theater ICBM missile defense systems (e.g. Strategic Defense Initiative SDI, or more recently the Missile Defense Agency.

== Night vision ==
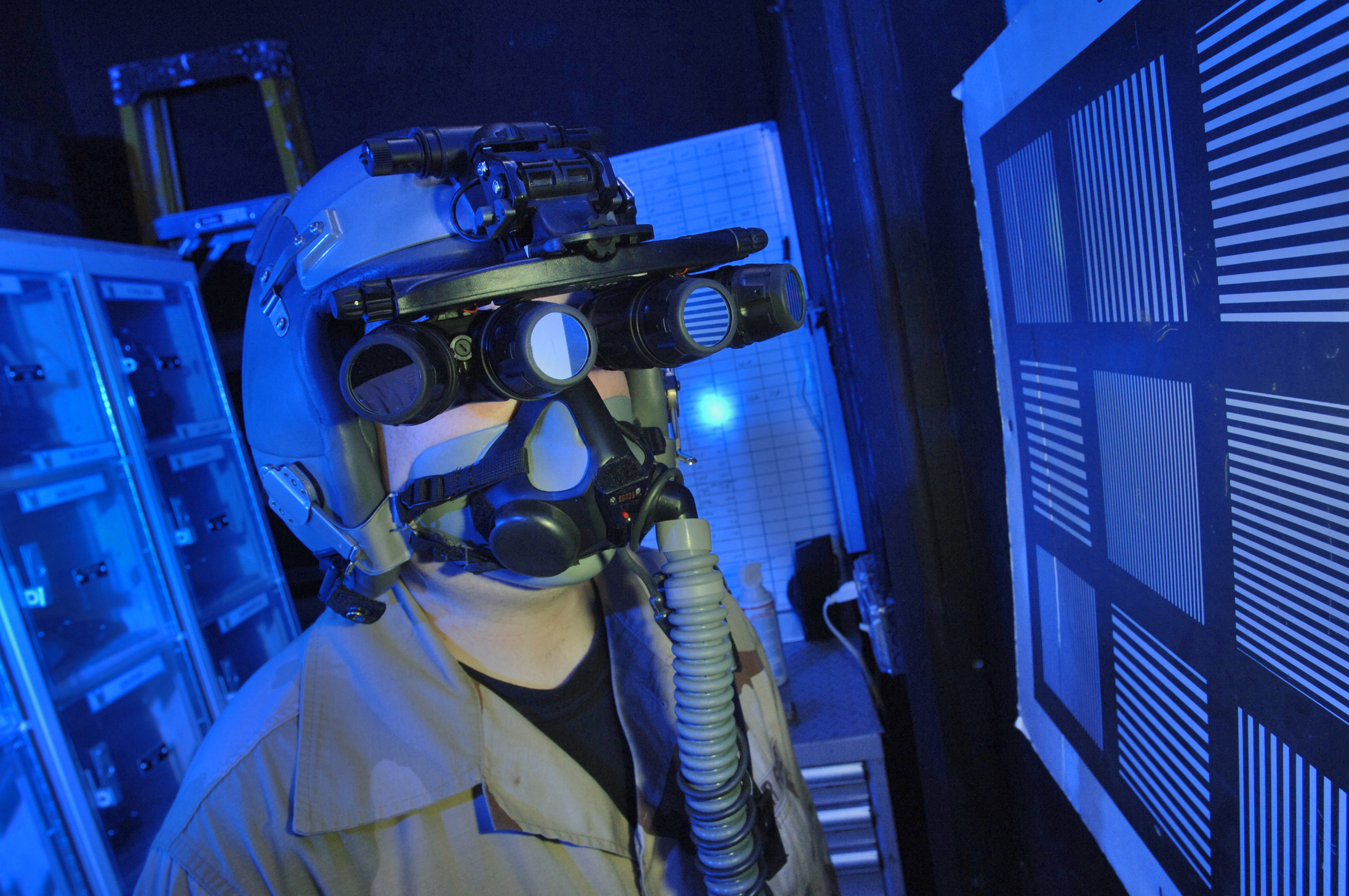
Panoramic Night Vision Goggles in testing.

A night vision device (NVD) is an optical instrument that allows images to be produced in levels of light approaching total darkness. They are most often used by the military and law enforcement agencies, but are available to civilian users. Night vision devices were first used in World War II, and came into wide use during the Vietnam War. The technology has evolved greatly since their introduction, leading to several "generations" of night vision equipment with performance increasing and price decreasing. The United States Air Force is experimenting with Panoramic Night Vision Goggles (PNVGs) which double the user's field of view to approximately 95 degrees by using four 16 mm image intensifiers tubes, rather than the more standard two 18 mm tubes.

Thermal images are visual displays of the amount of infrared (IR) energy emitted, transmitted, and reflected by an object. Because there are multiple sources of the infrared energy, it is difficult to get an accurate temperature of an object using this method. A thermal imaging camera is capable of performing algorithms to interpret that data and build an image. Although the image shows the viewer an approximation of the temperature at which the object is operating, the camera is using multiple sources of data based on the areas surrounding the object to determine that value rather than detecting the temperature.

Night vision infrared devices image in the near-infrared, just beyond the visual spectrum, and can see emitted or reflected near-infrared in complete visual darkness. All objects above the absolute zero temperature (0 K) emit infrared radiation. Hence, an excellent way to measure thermal variations is to use an thermographic device, usually a focal plane array (FPA) infrared camera capable of detecting radiation in the mid (3 to 5 μm) and long (7 to 14 μm) wave infrared bands, denoted as MWIR and LWIR, corresponding to two of the high transmittance infrared windows. Abnormal temperature profiles at the surface of an object are an indication of a potential problem. Thermal cameras detect radiation in the infrared range of the electromagnetic spectrum (roughly 900–14,000 nanometers or 0.9–14 μm) and produce images of that radiation, called thermograms.

Since infrared radiation is emitted by all objects near room temperature, according to the black body radiation law, thermography makes it possible to see one's environment with or without visible illumination. The amount of radiation emitted by an object increases with temperature. Therefore, thermography allows one to see variations in temperature. When viewed through a thermal imaging camera, warm objects stand out well against cooler backgrounds; humans and other warm-blooded animals become easily visible against the environment, day or night. As a result, thermography is particularly useful to the military and to security services.

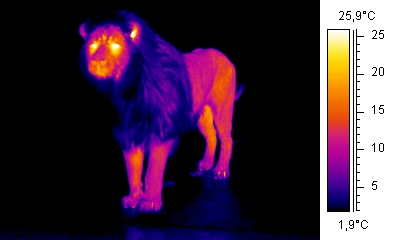
Thermogram of a lion

=== Thermography ===
In thermographic imaging, infrared radiation with wavelengths between 8–13 micrometers strikes the detector material, heating it, and thus changing its electrical resistance. This resistance change is measured and processed into temperatures which can be used to create an image. Unlike other types of infrared detecting equipment, microbolometers utilizing a transparent ceramic detector do not require cooling. Thus, a microbolometer is essentially an uncooled thermal sensor.

The material used in the detector must demonstrate large changes in resistance as a result of minute changes in temperature. As the material is heated, due to the incoming infrared radiation, the resistance of the material decreases. This is related to the material's temperature coefficient of resistance (TCR) specifically its negative temperature coefficient. Industry currently manufactures microbolometers that contain materials with TCRs near −2%.

=== VO_{2} and V_{2}O_{5} ===
The most commonly used ceramic material in IR radiation microbolometers is vanadium oxide. The various crystalline forms of vanadium oxide include both VO_{2} and V_{2}O_{5}. Deposition at high temperatures and performing post-annealing allows for the production of thin films of these crystalline compounds with superior properties, which may be easily integrated into the fabrication process. VO_{2} has low resistance but undergoes a metal-insulator phase change near 67 °C and also has a lower TCR value. On the other hand, V_{2}O_{5} exhibits high resistance and also high TCR.

Other IR transparent ceramic materials that have been investigated include doped forms of CuO, MnO and SiO.

== Missiles ==
AIM-9 Sidewinder
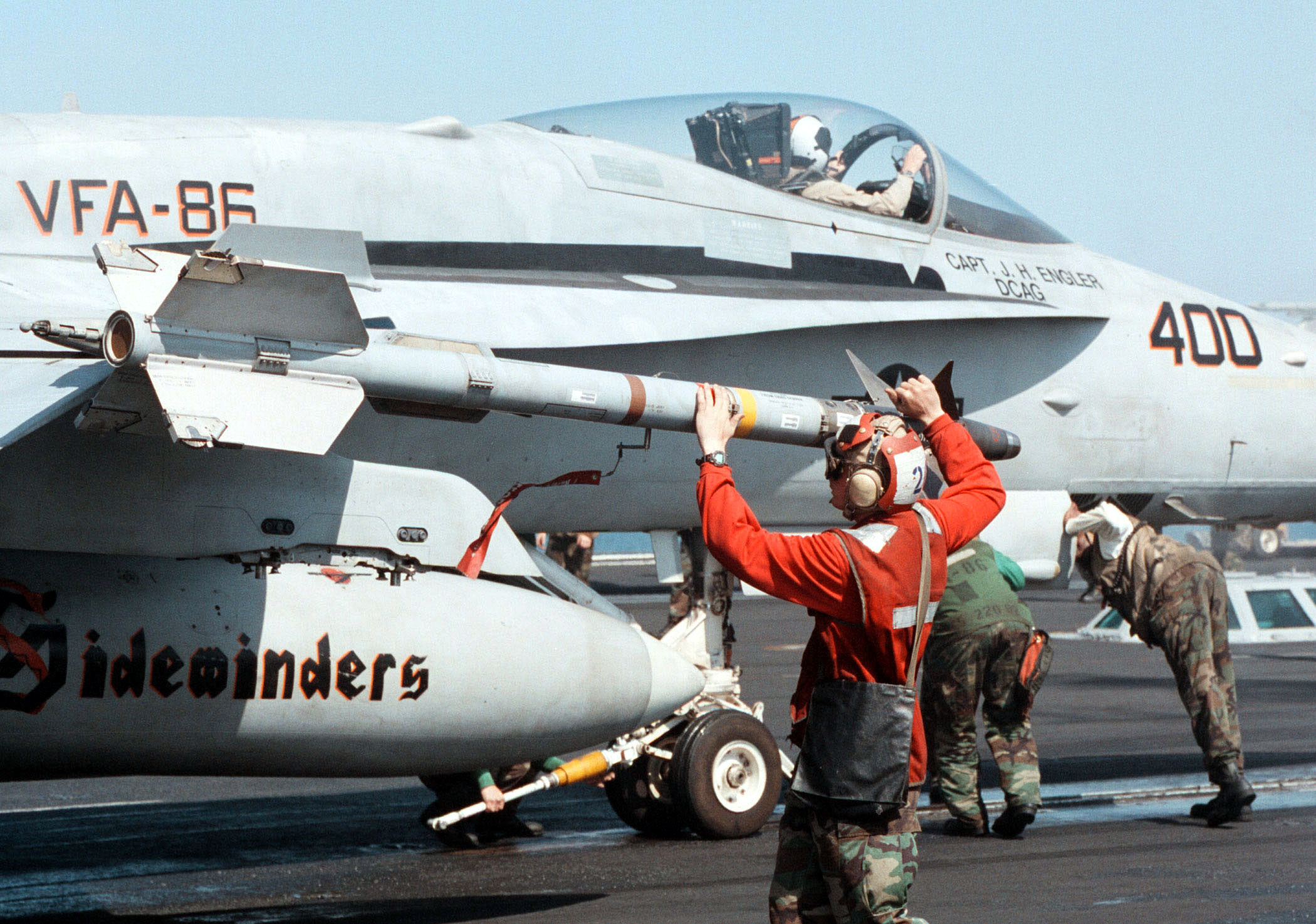
- Place of origin: United States

Many ceramic nanomaterials of interest for transparent armor solutions are also used for electromagnetic (EM) windows. These applications include radomes, IR domes, sensor protection, and multi-spectral windows. Optical properties of the materials used for these applications are critical, as the transmission window and related cut-offs (UV – IR) control the spectral bandwidth over which the window is operational. Not only must these materials possess abrasion resistance and strength properties common of most armor applications, but due to the extreme temperatures associated with the environment of military aircraft and missiles, they must also possess excellent thermal stability.

Thermal radiation is electromagnetic radiation emitted from the surface of an object which is due to the object's temperature. Infrared homing refers to a passive missile guidance system which uses the emission from a target of electromagnetic radiation in the infrared part of the spectrum to track it. Missiles that use infrared seeking are often referred to as "heat-seekers", since infrared is just below the visible spectrum of light in frequency and is radiated strongly by hot bodies. Many objects such as people, vehicle engines and aircraft generate and retain heat, and as such, are especially visible in the infrared wavelengths of light compared to objects in the background.

=== Sapphire ===
The current material of choice for high-speed infrared-guided missile domes is single-crystal sapphire. The optical transmission of sapphire does not extend to cover the entire mid-infrared range (3–5 μm), but starts to drop off at wavelengths greater than approximately 4.5 μm at room temperature. While the strength of sapphire is better than that of other available mid-range infrared dome materials at room temperature, it weakens above ~600 °C.

Limitations to larger area sapphires are often business related, in that larger induction furnaces and costly tooling dies are necessary in order to exceed current fabrication limits. However, as an industry, sapphire producers have remained competitive in the face of coating-hardened glass and new ceramic nanomaterials, and still managed to offer high performance and an expanded market.

=== Yttria, Y_{2}O_{3} ===
Alternative materials, such as yttrium oxide, offer better optical performance, but inferior mechanical durability. Future high-speed infrared-guided missiles will require new domes that are substantially more durable than those in use today, while still retaining maximum transparency across a wide wavelength range. A long-standing trade-off exists between optical bandpass and mechanical durability within the current collection of single-phase infrared transmitting materials, forcing missile designers to compromise on system performance. Optical nanocomposites may present the opportunity to engineer new materials that overcome this traditional compromise.

The first full scale missile domes of transparent yttria manufactured from nanoscale ceramic powders were developed in the 1980s under Navy funding. Raytheon perfected and characterized its undoped polycrystalline yttria, while lanthana-doped yttria was similarly developed by GTE Labs. The two versions had comparable IR transmittance, fracture toughness, and thermal expansion, while the undoped version exhibited twice the value of thermal conductivity.

Renewed interest in yttria windows and domes has prompted efforts to enhance mechanical properties by using nanoscale materials with submicrometer or nanosized grains. In one study, three vendors were selected to provide nanoscale powders for testing and evaluation, and they were compared to a conventional (5 μm) yttria powder previously used to prepare transparent yttria. While all of the nanopowders evaluated had impurity levels that were too high to allow processing to full transparency, 2 of them were processed to theoretical density and moderate transparency. Samples were sintered to a closed pore state at temperatures as low as 1400 C.

After the relatively short sintering period, the component is placed in a hot isostatic press (HIP) and processed for 3 – 10 hours at ~ 30 kpsi(~200 MPa) at a temperature similar to that of the initial sintering. The applied isostatic pressure provides additional driving force for densification by substantially increasing the atomic diffusion coefficients, which promotes additional viscous flow at or near grain boundaries and intergranular pores. Using this method, transparent yttria nanomaterials were produced at lower temperatures, shorter total firing times, and without extra additives which tend to reduce the thermal conductivity.

Recently, a newer method has been developed by Mouzon, which relies on the methods of glass-encapsulation, combined with vacuum sintering at 1600 °C followed by hot isostatic pressing (HIP) at 1500 °C of a highly agglomerated commercial powder. The use of evacuated glass capsules to perform HIP treatment allowed samples that showed open porosity after vacuum sintering to be sintered to transparency. The sintering response of the investigated powder was studied by careful microstructural observations using scanning electron microscopy and optical microscopy both in reflection and transmission. The key to this method is to keep porosity intergranular during pre-sintering, so that it can be removed subsequently by HIP treatment. It was found that agglomerates of closely packed particles are helpful to reach that purpose, since they densify fully and leave only intergranular porosity.

=== Composites ===
Prior to the work done at Raytheon, optical properties in nanocomposite ceramic materials had received little attention. Their studies clearly demonstrated near theoretical transmission in nanocomposite optical ceramics for the first time. The yttria/magnesia binary system is an ideal model system for nanocomposite formation. There is limited solid solubility in either one of the constituent phases, permitting a wide range of compositions to be investigated and compared to each other. According to the phase diagram, bi-phase mixtures are stable for all temperatures below ~ 2100 °C. In addition, neither yttria nor magnesia shows any absorption in the 3 – 5 μm mid-range IR portion of the EM spectrum.

In optical nanocomposites, two or more interpenetrating phases are mixed in a sub-micrometer grain sized, fully dense body. Infrared light scattering can be minimized (or even eliminated) in the material as long as the grain size of the individual phases is significantly smaller than infrared wavelengths. Experimental data suggests that limiting the grain size of the nanocomposite to approximately 1/15th of the wavelength of light is sufficient to limit scattering.

Nanocomposites of yttria and magnesia have been produced with a grain size of approximately 200 nm. These materials have yielded good transmission in the 3–5 μm range and strengths higher than that for single-phase individual constituents. Enhancement of mechanical properties in nanocomposite ceramic materials has been extensively studied. Significant increases in strength (2–5 times), toughness (1–4 times), and creep resistance have been observed in systems including SiC/Al_{2}O_{3}, SiC/Si_{3}N_{4}, SiC/MgO, and Al_{2}O_{3}/ZrO_{2}.

The strengthening mechanisms observed vary depending on the material system, and there does not appear to be any general consensus regarding strengthening mechanisms, even within a given system. In the SiC/Al_{2}O_{3} system, for example, it is widely known and accepted that the addition of SiC particles to the Al_{2}O_{3} matrix results in a change of failure mechanism from intergranular (between grains) to intragranular (within grains) fracture. The explanations for improved strength include:

- A simple reduction of processing flaw concentration during nanocomposite fabrication.
- Reduction of the critical flaw size in the material—resulting in increased strength as predicted by the Hall-Petch relation)
- Crack deflection at nanophase particles due to residual thermal stresses introduced upon cooling form processing temperatures.
- Microcracking along stress-induced dislocations in the matrix material.

== Armor ==
There is an increasing need in the military sector for high-strength, robust materials which have the capability to transmit light around the visible (0.4–0.7 micrometers) and mid-infrared (1–5 micrometers) regions of the spectrum. These materials are needed for applications requiring transparent armor. Transparent armor is a material or system of materials designed to be optically transparent, yet protect from fragmentation or ballistic impacts. The primary requirement for a transparent armor system is to not only defeat the designated threat but also provide a multi-hit capability with minimized distortion of surrounding areas. Transparent armor windows must also be compatible with night vision equipment. New materials that are thinner, lightweight, and offer better ballistic performance are being sought.

Existing transparent armor systems typically have many layers, separated by polymer (e.g. polycarbonate) interlayers. The polymer interlayer is used to mitigate the stresses from thermal expansion mismatches, as well as to stop crack propagation from ceramic to polymer. The polycarbonate is also currently used in applications such as visors, face shields and laser protection goggles. The search for lighter materials has also led to investigations into other polymeric materials such as transparent nylons, polyurethane, and acrylics. The optical properties and durability of transparent plastics limit their use in armor applications. Investigations carried out in the 1970s had shown promise for the use of polyurethane as armor material, but the optical properties were not adequate for transparent armor applications.

Several glasses are utilized in transparent armor, such as normal plate glass (soda-lime-silica), borosilicate glasses, and fused silica. Plate glass has been the most common glass used due to its low cost, but greater requirements for the optical properties and ballistic performance have generated the need for new materials. Chemical or thermal treatments can increase the strength of glasses, and the controlled crystallization of certain glass systems can produce transparent glass-ceramics. Alstom Grid Research & Technology (Stafford, UK), produced a lithium disilicate based glass-ceramic known as TransArm, for use in transparent armor systems with continuous production yielding vehicle windscreen sized pieces (and larger). The inherent advantages of glasses and glass-ceramics include having lower cost than most other ceramic materials, the ability to be produced in curved shapes, and the ability to be formed into large sheets.

Transparent crystalline ceramics are used to defeat advanced threats. Three major transparent candidates currently exist: aluminum oxynitride (AlON), magnesium aluminate spinel (spinel), and single crystal aluminum oxide (sapphire).

=== Aluminium oxynitride spinel ===
Aluminium oxynitride spinel (Al_{23}O_{27}N_{5}), abbreviated as AlON, is one of the leading candidates for transparent armor. It is produced by the Surmet Corporation under the trademark ALON. The incorporation of nitrogen into aluminium oxide stabilizes a crystalline spinel phase, which due to its cubic crystal structure and unit cell, is an isotropic material which can be produced as transparent ceramic nanomaterial. Thus, fine-grained polycrystalline nanomaterials can be produced and formed into complex geometries using conventional ceramic forming techniques such as hot isostatic pressing and slip casting.

The Surmet Corporation has acquired Raytheon's ALON business and is currently building a market for this technology in the area of Transparent Armor, Sensor windows, Reconnaissance windows and IR Optics such as Lenses and Domes and as an alternative to quartz and sapphire in the semiconductor market. The AlON based transparent armor has been tested to stop multi-hit threats including of 30calAPM2 rounds and 50calAPM2 rounds successfully. The high hardness of AlON provides a scratch resistance which exceeds even the most durable coatings for glass scanner windows, such as those used in supermarkets. Surmet has successfully produced a 15"x18" curved AlON window and is currently attempting to scale up the technology and reduce the cost. In addition, the U.S. Army and U.S. Air Force are both seeking development into next generation applications.

=== Spinel ===
Magnesium aluminate spinel (MgAl_{2}O_{4}) is a transparent ceramic with a cubic crystal structure with an excellent optical transmission from 0.2 to 5.5 micrometers in its polycrystalline form. Optical quality transparent spinel has been produced by sinter/HIP, hot pressing, and hot press/HIP operations, and it has been shown that the use of a hot isostatic press can improve its optical and physical properties.

Spinel offers some processing advantages over AlON, such as the fact that spinel powder is available from commercial manufacturers while AlON powders are proprietary to Raytheon. It is also capable of being processed at much lower temperatures than AlON and has been shown to possess superior optical properties within the infrared (IR) region. The improved optical characteristics make spinel attractive in sensor applications where effective communication is impacted by the protective missile dome's absorption characteristics.

Transparent magnesium aluminate spinel is commercially offered in sheet form with customizable dimensions.

An extensive NRL review of the literature has indicated clearly that attempts to make high-quality spinel have failed to date because the densification dynamics of spinel are poorly understood. They have conducted extensive research into the dynamics involved during the densification of spinel. Their research has shown that LiF, although necessary, also has extremely adverse effects during the final stages of densification. Additionally, its distribution in the precursor spinel powders is of critical importance.

Traditional bulk mixing processes used to mix LiF sintering aid into a powder leave fairly inhomogeneous distribution of Lif that must be homogenized by extended heat treatment times at elevated temperatures. The homogenizing temperature for Lif/Spinel occurs at the temperature of fast reaction between the LiF and the Al_{2}O_{3}. In order to avoid this detrimental reaction, they have developed a new process that uniformly coats the spinel particles with the sintering aid. This allows them to reduce the amount of Lif necessary for densification and to rapidly heat through the temperature of maximum reactivity. These developments have allowed NRL to fabricate MgAl_{2}O_{4} spinel to high transparency with extremely high reproducibility that should enable military as well as commercial use of spinel.

=== Sapphire ===
Single-crystal aluminum oxide (sapphire – Al_{2}O_{3}) is a transparent ceramic. Sapphire's crystal structure is rhombohedral and thus its properties are anisotropic, varying with crystallographic orientation. Transparent alumina is currently one of the most mature transparent ceramics from a production and application perspective, and is available from several manufacturers. But the cost is high due to the processing temperature involved, as well as machining costs to cut parts out of single crystal boules. It also has a very high mechanical strength – but that is dependent on the surface finish.

The high level of maturity of sapphire from a production and application standpoint can be attributed to two areas of business: electromagnetic spectrum windows for missiles and domes, and electronic/semiconductor industries and applications.

There are current programs to scale-up sapphire grown by the heat exchanger method or edge defined film-fed growth (EFG) processes. Its maturity stems from its use as windows and in semiconductor industry. Crystal Systems Inc. which uses single crystal growth techniques, is currently scaling their sapphire boules to 13-inch (330 mm) diameter and larger. Another producer, the Saint-Gobain Group produces transparent sapphire using an edge-defined growth technique. Sapphire grown by this technique produces an optically inferior material to that which is grown via single crystal techniques, but is much less expensive, and retains much of the hardness, transmission, and scratch-resistant characteristics. Saint-Gobain is currently capable of producing 0.43" thick (as grown) sapphire, in 12" × 18.5" sheets, as well as thick, single-curved sheets. The U.S. Army Research Laboratory is currently investigating use of this material in a laminate design for transparent armor systems. The Saint Gobain Group have commercialized the capability to meet flight requirements on the F-35 Joint Strike Fighter and F-22 Raptor next generation fighter aircraft.

=== Composites ===
Future high-speed infrared-guided missiles will require new dome materials that are substantially more durable than those in use today, while retaining maximum transparency across the entire operational spectrum or bandwidth. A long-standing compromise exists between optical bandpass and mechanical durability within the current group of single-phase (crystalline or glassy) IR transmitting ceramic materials, forcing missile designers to accept substandard overall system performance. Optical nanocomposites may provide the opportunity to engineer new materials that may overcome these traditional limitations.

For example, transparent ceramic armor consisting of a lightweight composite has been formed by utilizing a face plate of transparent alumina Al_{2}O_{3} (or magnesia MgO) with a back-up plate of transparent plastic. The two plates (bonded together with a transparent adhesive) afford complete ballistic protection against 0.30 AP M2 projectiles at 0° obliquity with a muzzle velocity of 2,770 ft (840 m) per second. Another transparent composite armor provided complete protection for small arms projectiles up to and including caliber .50 AP M2 projectiles consisting of two or more layers of transparent ceramic material.

Nanocomposites of yttria and magnesia have been produced with an average grain size of ~200 nm. These materials have exhibited near theoretical transmission in the 3 – 5 μm IR band. Additionally, such composites have yielded higher strengths than those observed for single phase solid-state components. Despite a lack of agreement regarding mechanism of failure, it is widely accepted that nanocomposite ceramic materials can and do offer improved mechanical properties over those of single phase materials or nanomaterials of uniform chemical composition.

Nanocomposite ceramic materials also offer interesting mechanical properties not achievable in other materials, such as superplastic flow and metal-like machinability. It is anticipated that further development will result in high strength, high transparency nanomaterials which are suitable for application as next generation armor.

== See also ==
- Ceramic engineering
- Lumicera
- Nanomaterials
- Optical fiber
- Transparent materials
