= Yttrium(III) oxide =

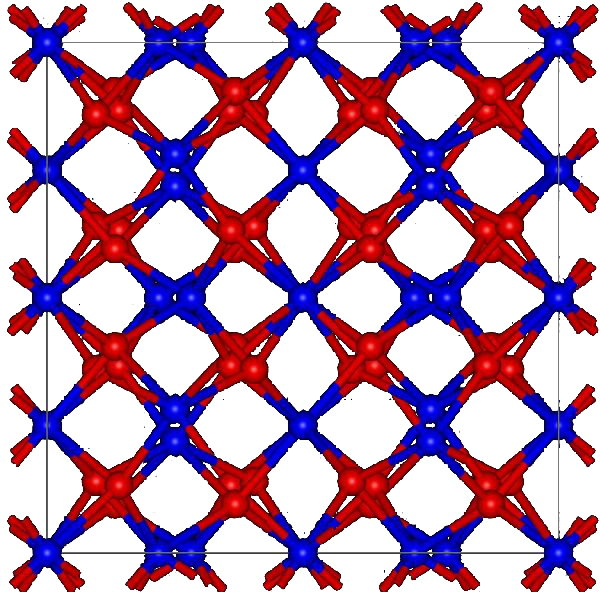
- Yttrium(III) oxide

Names
- IUPAC name Yttrium(III) oxide.
- Other names Yttria, diyttrium trioxide, yttrium sesquioxide

Identifiers
| CAS Number | 1314-36-9 |
| 3D model (JSmol) | Interactive image |
| ChemSpider | 140159 |
| ECHA InfoCard | 100.013.849 |
| EC Number | 215-233-5 |
| PubChem CID | 518711 |
| RTECS number | ZG3850000 |
| UNII | X8071685XT |
| CompTox Dashboard (EPA) | DTXSID5051573 |
- InChI: InChI=1S/3O.2Y Key: SIWVEOZUMHYXCS-UHFFFAOYSA-N
- SMILES: O=[Y]O[Y]=O

Properties
| Chemical formula | Y_{2}O_{3} |
| Molar mass | 225.81 g/mol |
| Appearance | White solid. |
| Density | 5.010 g/cm^{3}, solid |
| Melting point | 2,425 °C (4,397 °F; 2,698 K) |
| Boiling point | 4,300 °C (7,770 °F; 4,570 K) |
| Solubility in water | insoluble |
| Magnetic susceptibility (χ) | +44.4·10^{−6} cm^{3}/mol |

Structure
| Crystal structure | Cubic (bixbyite), cI80 |
| Space group | Ia3̅ (No. 206) |
| Coordination geometry | Octahedral |

Thermochemistry
| Std molar entropy (S^{⦵}_{298}) | 99.08 J/mol·K |
| Std enthalpy of formation (Δ_{f}H^{⦵}_{298}) | −1905.310 kJ/mol |
| Gibbs free energy (Δ_{f}G^{⦵}) | −1816.609 kJ/mol |

Hazards
- Lethal dose or concentration (LD, LC)
| LD_{Lo} (lowest published) | >10,000 mg/kg (rat, oral) >6000 mg/kg (mouse, oral) |

Related compounds
| Other anions | Yttrium(III) sulfide |
| Other cations | Scandium(III) oxide, Lutetium(III) oxide |
| Related compounds | Yttrium barium copper oxide |
- Except where otherwise noted, data are given for materials in their standard state (at 25 °C [77 °F], 100 kPa). verify (what is ?) Infobox references

Yttrium oxide, also known as yttria, is Y_{2}O_{3}. It is an air-stable, white solid substance.

The thermal conductivity of yttrium oxide is 27 W/(m·K).

== Applications ==
=== Phosphors ===
Yttrium oxide is widely used to make Eu:YVO_{4} and Eu:Y_{2}O_{3} phosphors that give the red color in color TV picture tubes.

=== Yttria lasers ===
Y_{2}O_{3} is a prospective solid-state laser material. In particular, lasers with ytterbium as dopant allow the efficient operation both in continuous operation and in pulsed regimes. At high concentration of excitations (of order of 1%) and poor cooling, the quenching of emission at laser frequency and avalanche broadband emission takes place. (Yttria-based lasers are not to be confused with YAG lasers using yttrium aluminium garnet, a widely used crystal host for rare earth laser dopants).

=== Gas lighting ===
The original use of the mineral yttria and the purpose of its extraction from mineral sources was as part of the process of making gas mantles and other products for turning the flames of artificially-produced gases (initially hydrogen, later coal gas, paraffin, or other products) into human-visible light. This use is almost obsolete - thorium and cerium oxides are larger components of such products these days.

=== Dental ceramics ===
Yttrium oxide is used to stabilize the Zirconia in late-generation porcelain-free metal-free dental ceramics. This is a very hard ceramic used as a strong base material in some full ceramic restorations. The zirconia used in dentistry is zirconium oxide which has been stabilized with the addition of yttrium oxide. The full name of zirconia used in dentistry is "yttria-stabilized zirconia" or YSZ.

=== Microwave filters ===
Yttrium oxide is also used to make yttrium iron garnets, which are very effective microwave filters.

=== Superconductors ===
Y_{2}O_{3} is used to make the high temperature superconductor YBa_{2}Cu_{3}O_{7}, known as "1-2-3" to indicate the ratio of the metal constituents:

2 Y_{2}O_{3} + 8 BaO + 12 CuO + O_{2} → 4 YBa_{2}Cu_{3}O_{7}

This synthesis is typically conducted at 800 °C.

=== Inorganic synthesis ===
Yttrium oxide is an important starting point for inorganic compounds. For organometallic chemistry it is converted to YCl_{3} in a reaction with concentrated hydrochloric acid and ammonium chloride.

=== High-temperature coatings ===
Y_{2}O_{3} is used in specialty coatings and pastes that can withstand high temperatures and act as a barrier for reactive metals such as uranium.

=== Heat radiators ===
NASA developed a material it dubbed Solar White that it is exploring for use as a radiator in deep space, where it is expected to reflect more than 99.9% of the sun’s energy (low solar radiation absorption and high infrared emittance). A sphere covered with a 10 mm coating sited far from the Earth and 1 astronomical unit from the sun could keep temperatures below 50 K. One use is long-term cryogenic storage.

=== Optical Industry ===
It's also used to create red phosphors for LED screens and TV tubes, as well as in anti-reflective coatings to enhance light transmission.

== Natural occurrence ==
Yttriaite-(Y), approved as a new mineral species in 2010, is the natural form of yttria. It is exceedingly rare, occurring as inclusions in native tungsten particles in a placer deposit of the Bol’shaja Pol’ja (Russian: Большая Полья) river, Prepolar Ural, Siberia. As a chemical component of other minerals, the oxide yttria was first isolated in 1789 by Johan Gadolin, from rare-earth minerals in a mine at the Swedish town of Ytterby, near Stockholm.

== See also ==
- Yttralox
