= Kodak DC Series =

Line of digital cameras

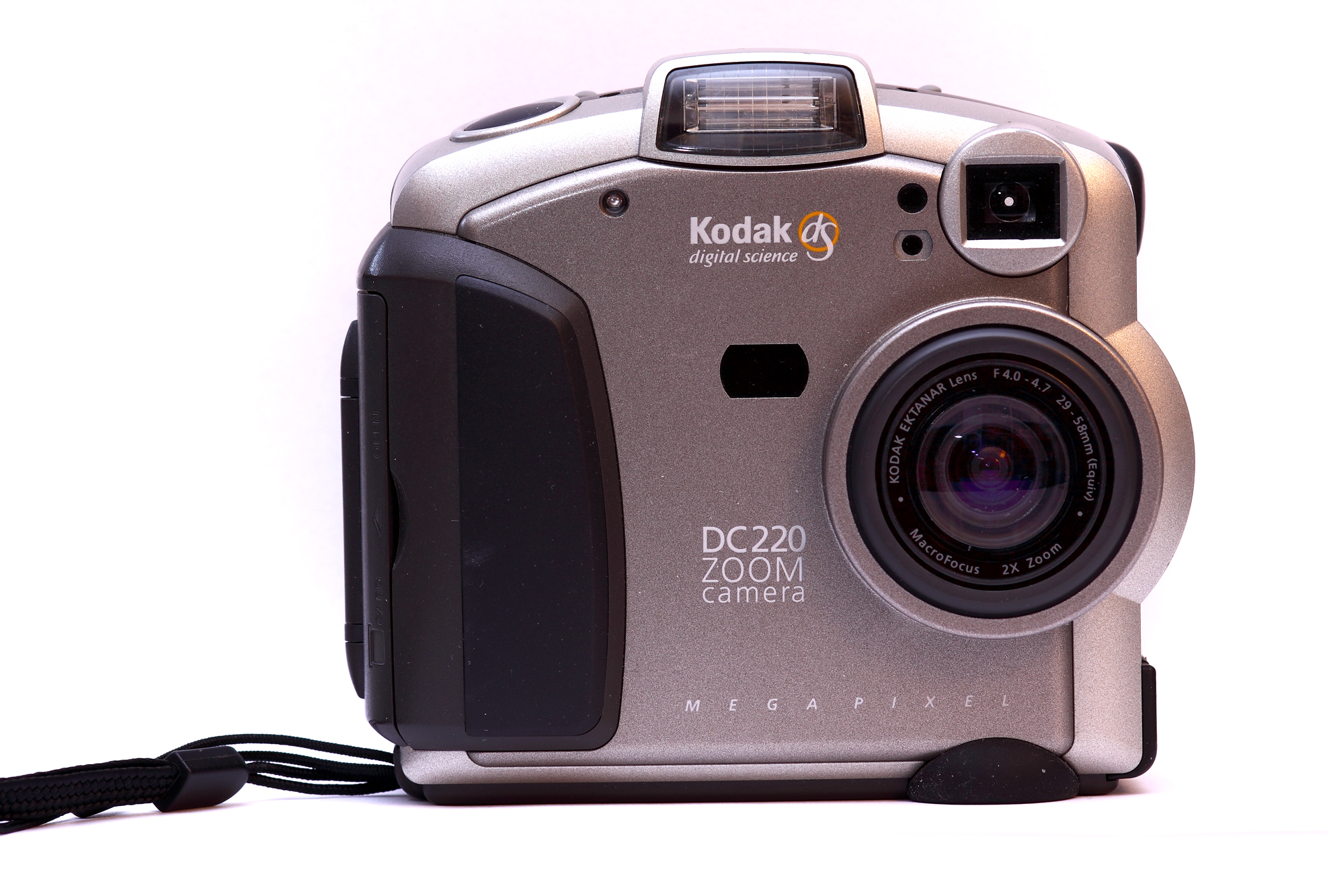
A Kodak DC220

The Kodak DC series was Kodak's pioneering consumer-grade line of digital cameras; as distinct from their much more expensive professional Kodak DCS series. Cameras in the DC series were manufactured and sold during the mid-to-late 1990s and early 2000s. Some were branded as "Digital Science". Most of these early digital cameras supported RS-232 serial port connections because USB hardware was not widely available before 1998. Some models in the DC series ran on the short lived DigitaOS, a camera operating system that allowed third-party software to be installed.

The DC series was superseded by the Kodak EasyShare camera line.

== Kodak DC20 ==
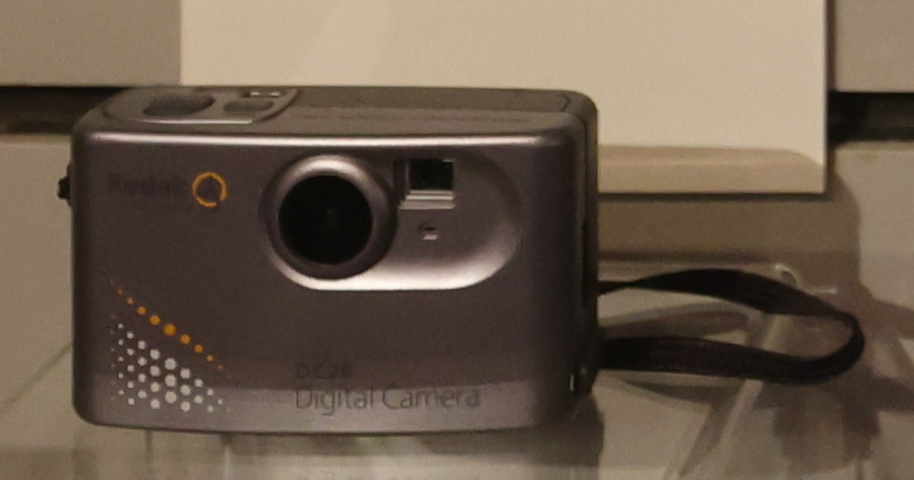
A Kodak DC20

The Kodak DC20 was an early digital camera first released by Kodak on 3 June 1996, in Australia at price of AU$560. It had a manufacturer's suggested retail price of US$299 when most other digital cameras at the time cost well over $1000, and was the first product sold by Kodak through its website. The DC20 only had the most basic features of a digital camera, with only three buttons: power, erase, and shutter release. It had no liquid crystal display (LCD) for reviewing pictures. It came with only 1 megabyte of internal flash memory, which could only store 8 or 16 images, depending on image quality, and did not support external flash memory. It had no built-in photo flash. Its CCD sensor had a maximum resolution of 493×373 pixels. It had a fixed focal length f/4 lens, equivalent to 47 mm for 35 mm single lens reflex film cameras.

With physical dimensions of 31×102×61 mm (1.2×4.0×2.4 in), the Kodak DC20 was the first ultracompact digital camera. Its sleek compact size would remain unrivaled until the release of the Canon Digital Ixus and Casio Exilim.

There were several add-on lenses released for the Kodak DC20. These included a macro adapter, a telephoto converter, and a wide-angle converter from Tiffen. These were clip-on lenses since the original lens had no thread. There was also an add-on photo flash unit made by Kodak.

== Kodak DC25 ==
The Kodak DC25 was released about the same time as the Kodak DC20. They used the same 493×373 pixel CCD sensor and 47 mm-equivalent lens. They also shared a similar form factor and shape. However the DC25 was considerably larger than the DC20 because it included an LC display for picture review. Moreover, the Kodak DC25 was among the first cameras to have a PCMCIA slot to support CompactFlash cards (branded "Picture Card") for external storage. It did not support the JPEG image file format, storing images in Kodak's proprietary K25 file format instead, as the JPEG image standard was very new and still under development at the time the camera was being designed.

== Kodak DC40 ==
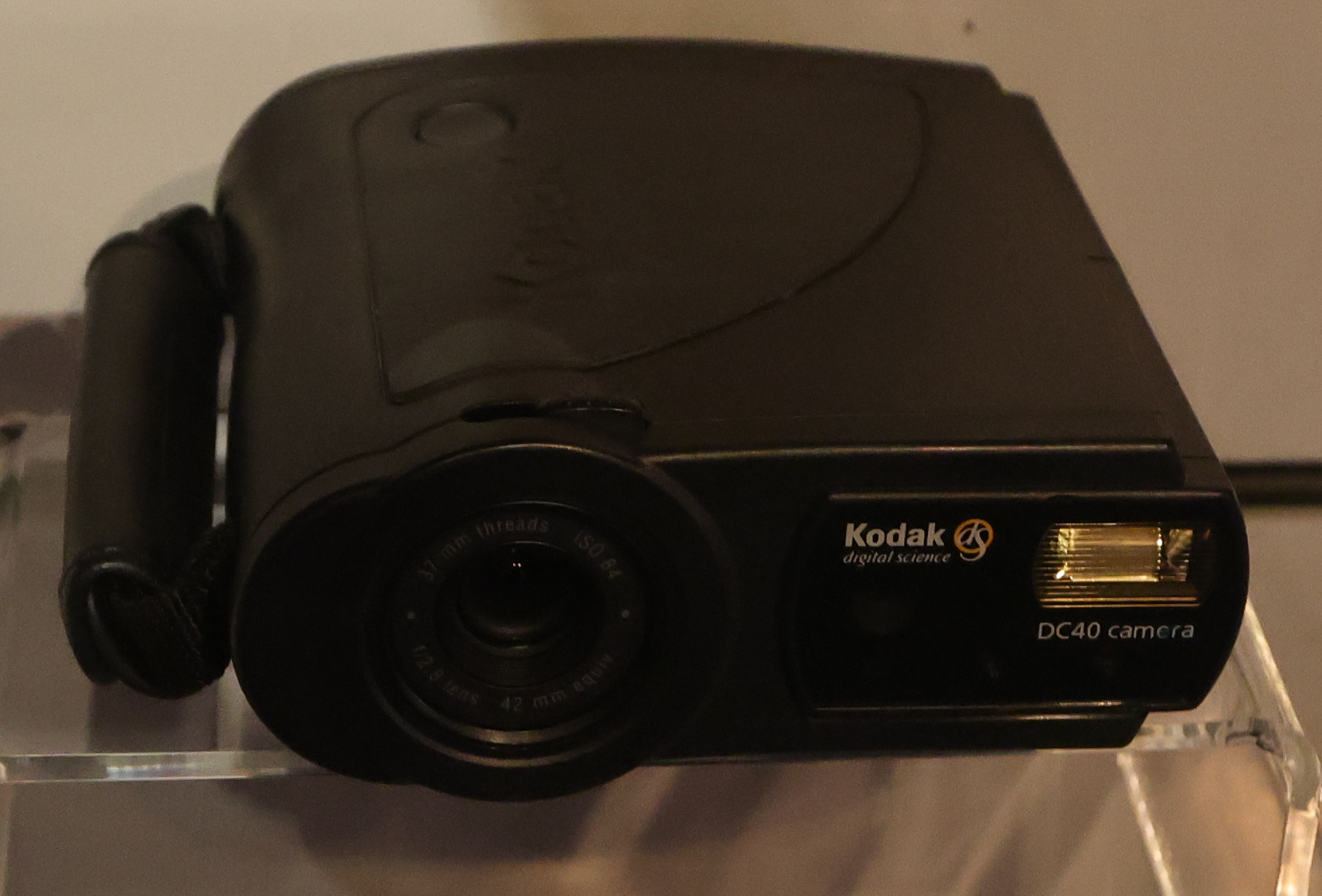
Kodak DC40

Released in 1995, the DC40 shared its lineage with the Apple QuickTake 100, both of which were manufactured by Chinon. It came with fixed focal length lens of 42 mm-equivalent and a 768x512 pixel CCD sensor. It came with 4 megabyte of internal flash memory storage and did not have any capabilities for using external memory. It also did not have an LCD for picture display. The cost was $1,000.

== Kodak DC50 ==
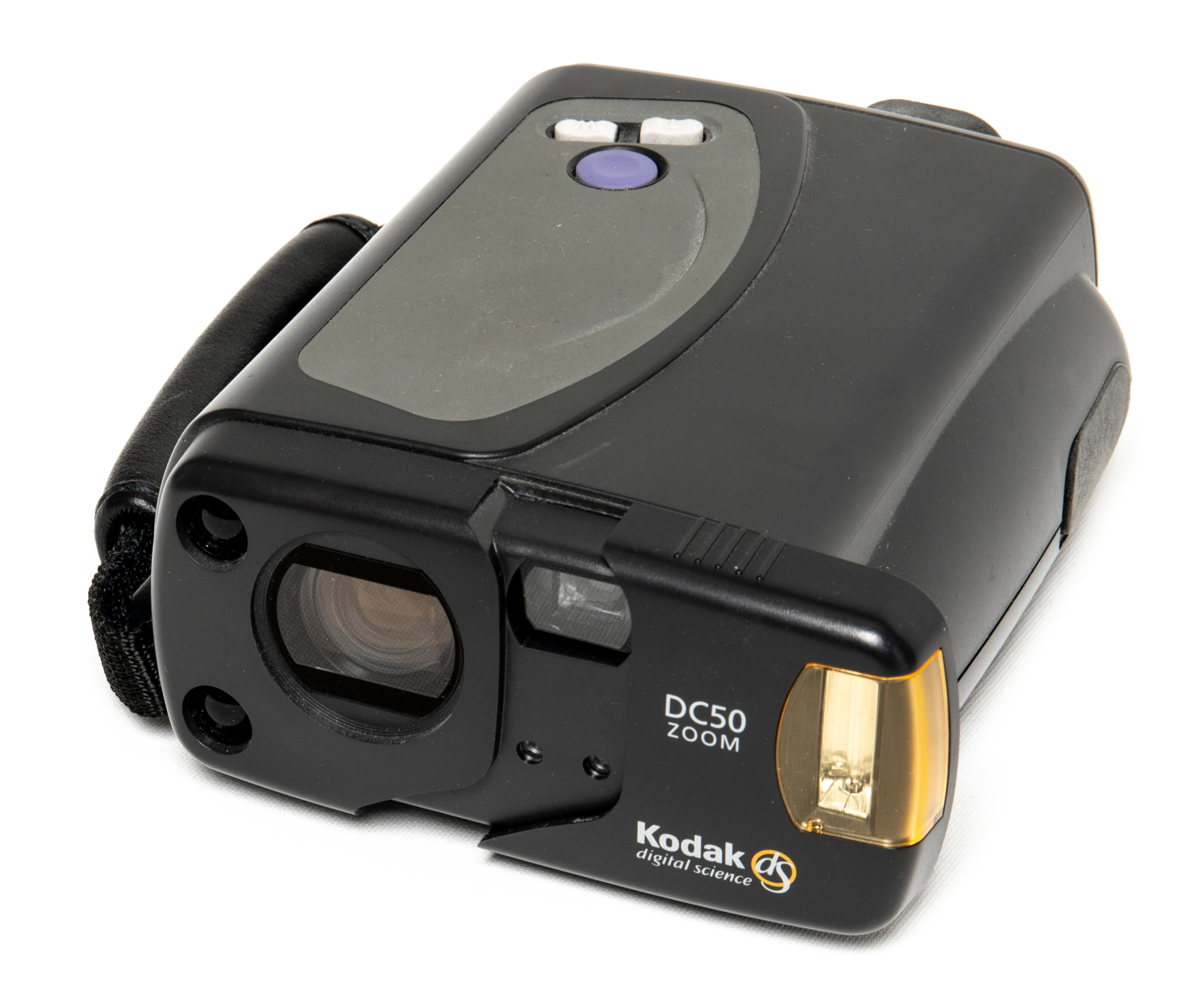
Kodak DC 50 – front view

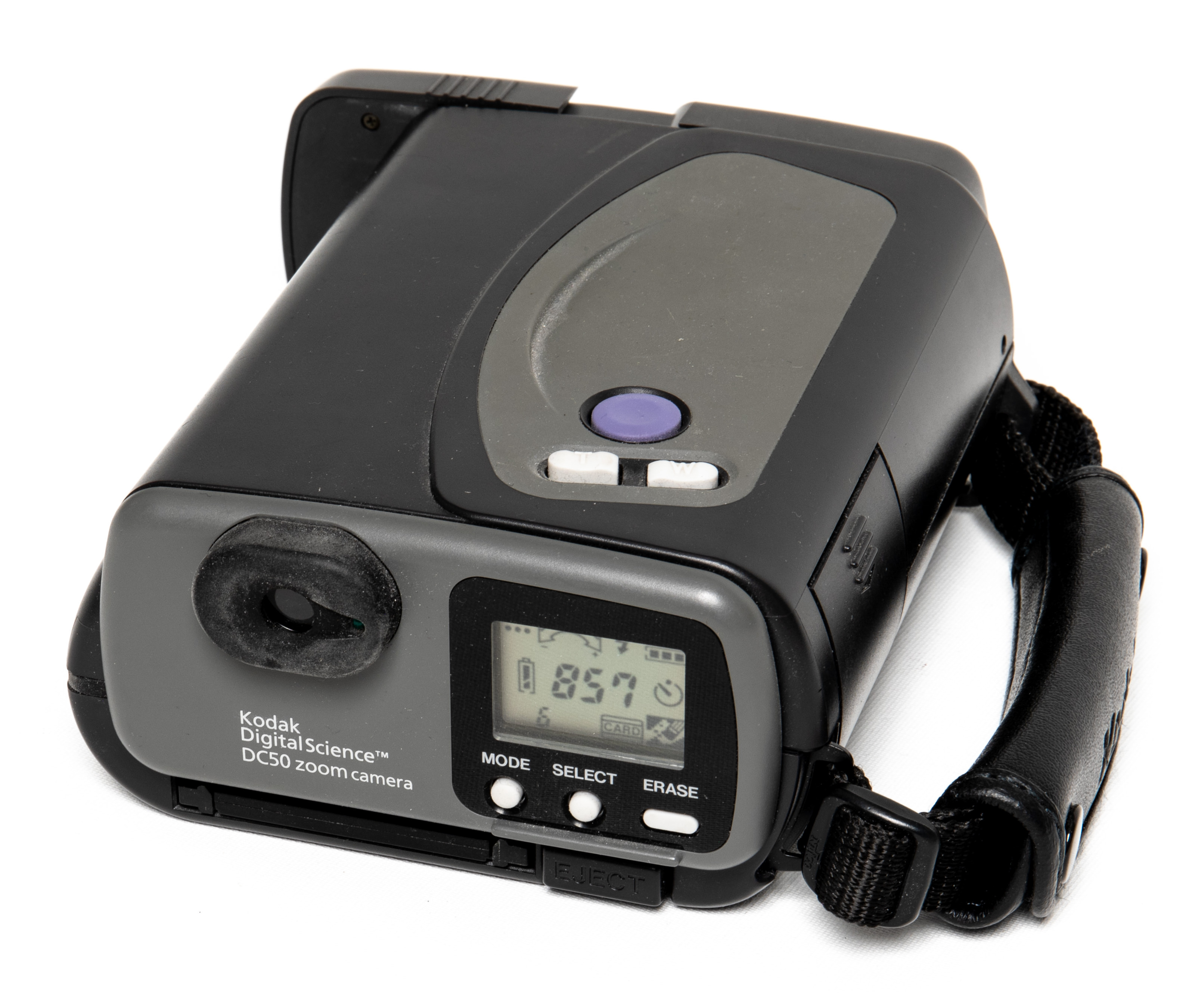
Kodak DC 50 – back view

This early digital camera is a clone of the Chinon ES-3000. The design was also licensed to other manufacturers and sold as, Dycam 10-C, Promaster Digital One, and Dakota DCC-9500; but with improved software, a higher resolution sensor, and a dark gray case. The Kodak DC50 featured a 3:1 zoom lens (37 mm to 111 mm-equivalent), built-in photo flash and a PCMCIA slot for Type I and II ATA cards. It came with a simple monochrome LCD to report basic camera statistics, but did not come with a graphical LCD for picture review. The Kodak DC50 had a 768x512 pixel color CCD sensor, just like the Kodak DC40 (usually displayed at 756x504). It only stored images in Kodak's proprietary KDC file format with 3 user-selectable quality levels.

== Kodak DC120 ==
Released in 1997, the Kodak DC120 had a similar size and form factor as the DC40 and the DC50. Like the DC50, it also had a 3:1 zoom lens. However, it boasted a larger 1280×960 pixel CCD sensor and built-in photo flash. It had 2 megabytes of internal picture storage and supported CompactFlash external memory storage. It also had a color LCD for picture review. It continued to use Kodak's KDC file format. The camera had an optical viewfinder with dual target rings in the center to account for parallax over the zoom range.

The DC120 required 6 to 6.8 volts DC power, supplied by four AA-size 1.7 V lithium primary cells. Although nickel-metal hydride (Ni-MH) 1.25 V or nickel-cadmium (Ni-Cd) 1.2 V cells could be used, due to their lower capacity and discharge characteristics they needed to be replaced frequently — every 20 to 30 pictures, or so. Ordinary alkaline or carbon-zinc primary cells could be used for daylight photography and during storage to keep the camera's internal clock running and preserve settings, but they had excessive internal resistance and insufficient current capacity to power the camera when the photo flash was in use. An optional external AC adapter could also be used, supplying 7-8 VDC via a coaxial power plug, for transferring pictures to a computer or for fixed use indoors.

== DigitaOS models ==
DigitaOS was intended to automate certain camera features through user-created scripts. In addition, users could use software written for Digita to extend camera functionality, including Digita FX, a program which enabled in-camera image editing.

=== Kodak DC220 and DC260 ===
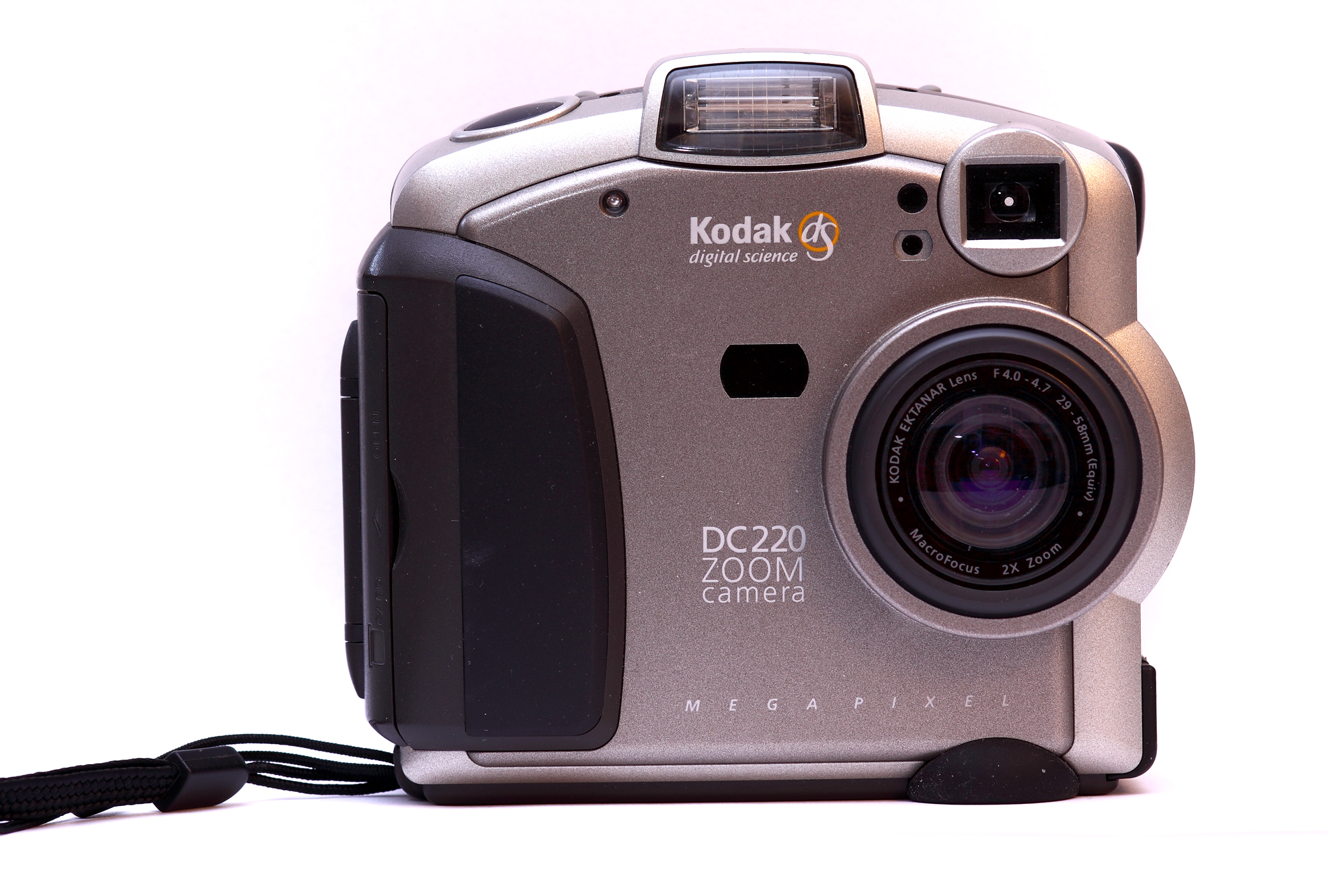
Kodak DC220

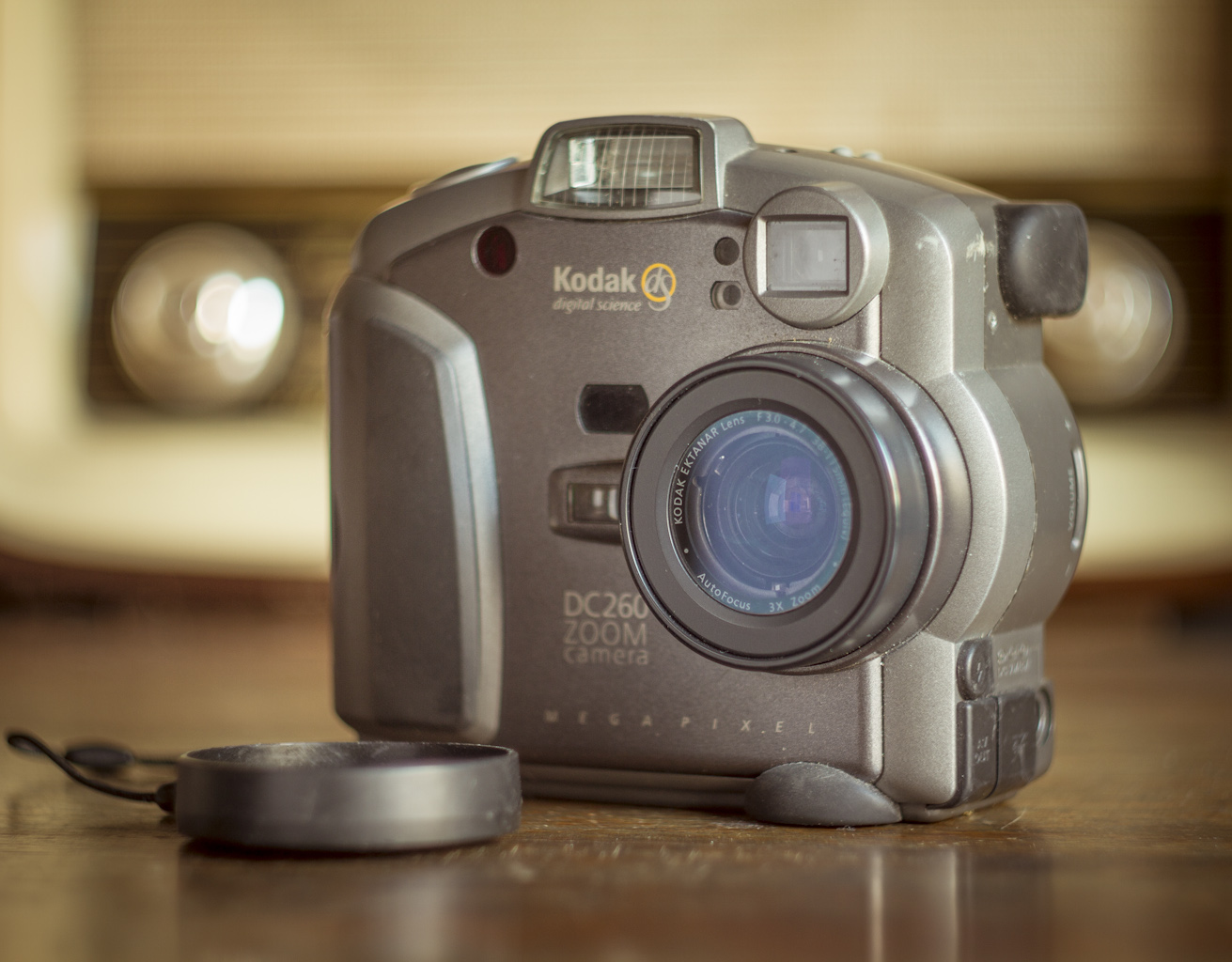
Kodak DC260

The DC220 and DC260 were released in 1998 and were closely related internally; while the DC220 had a 2× zoom lens (29–58 mm equivalent with a close-up mode) and maximum resolution of 1152×864 (XGA+), the DC260 was equipped with a 3× zoom lens (38–115 mm equivalent) and a higher maximum resolution of 1536×1024.

=== Kodak DC265 ===
The DC265 was an upgraded DC260, equipped with a faster processor while retaining the same maximum resolution and zoom lens.

=== Kodak DC290 ===
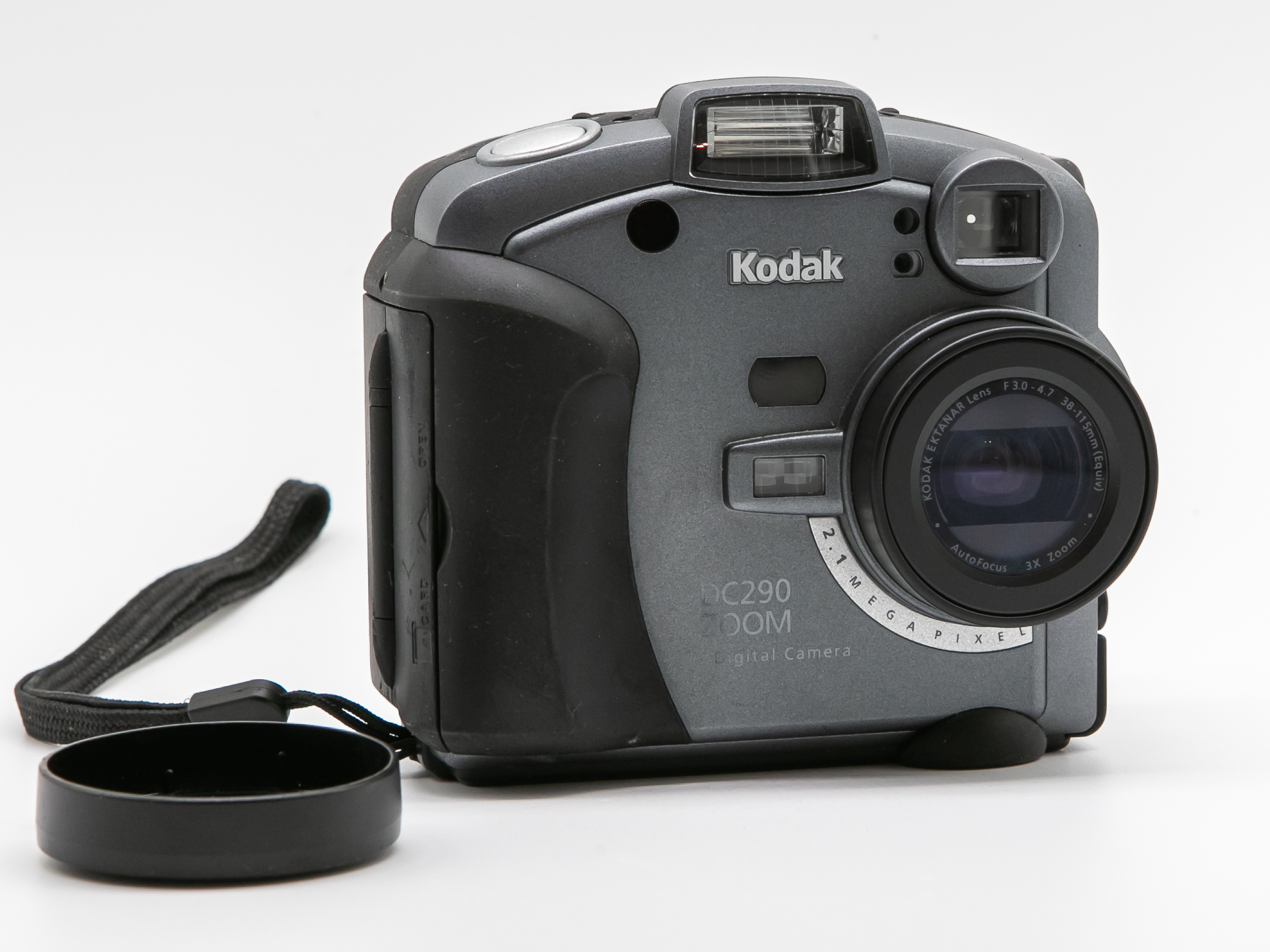
Kodak DC290

The DC290 also used the same lens as the DC260, with an increased maximum resolution of 2240×1500 (interpolated from 1792×1200). It was released in fall 1999.

== Kodak DC240 ==
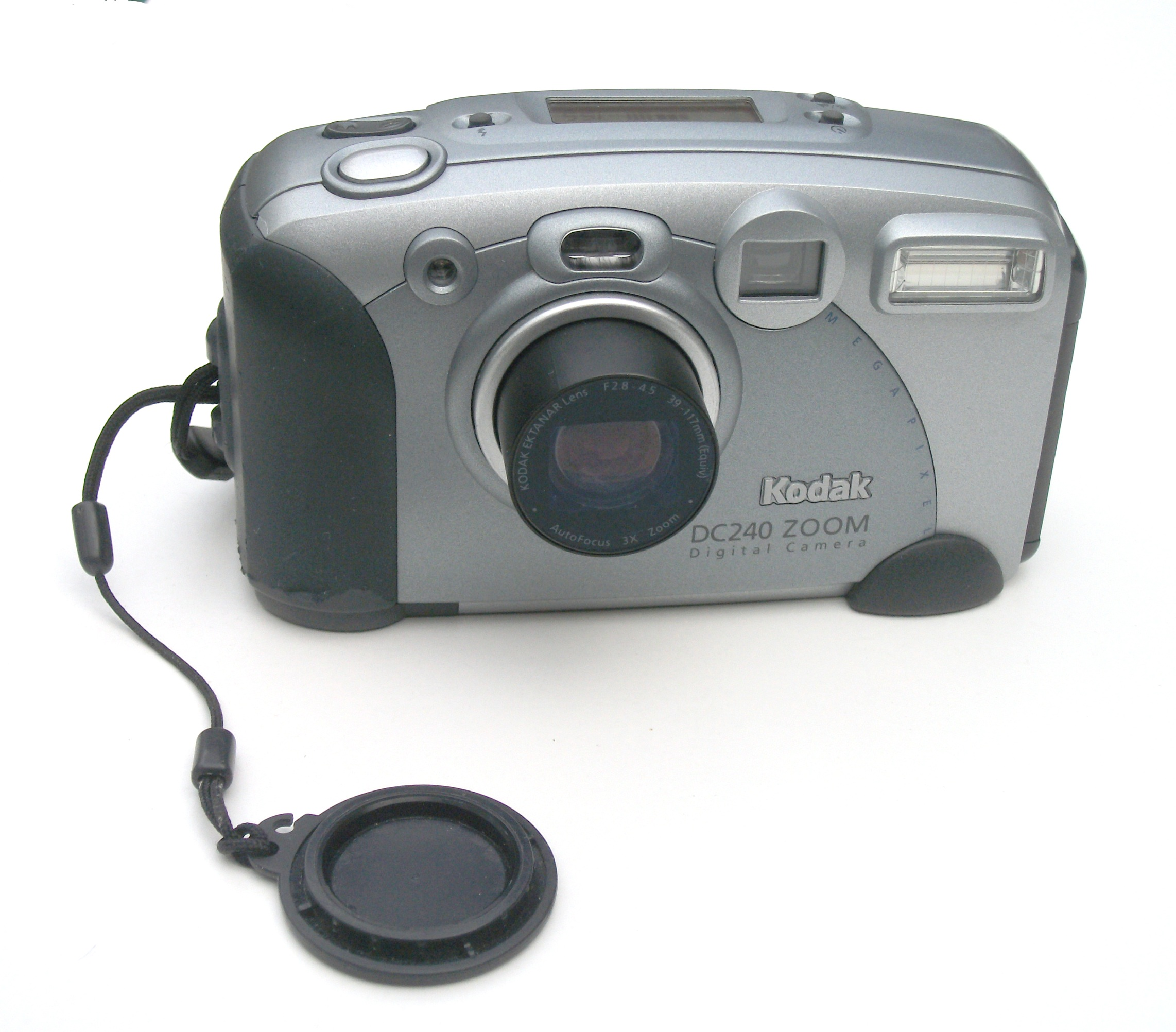
Kodak DC 240

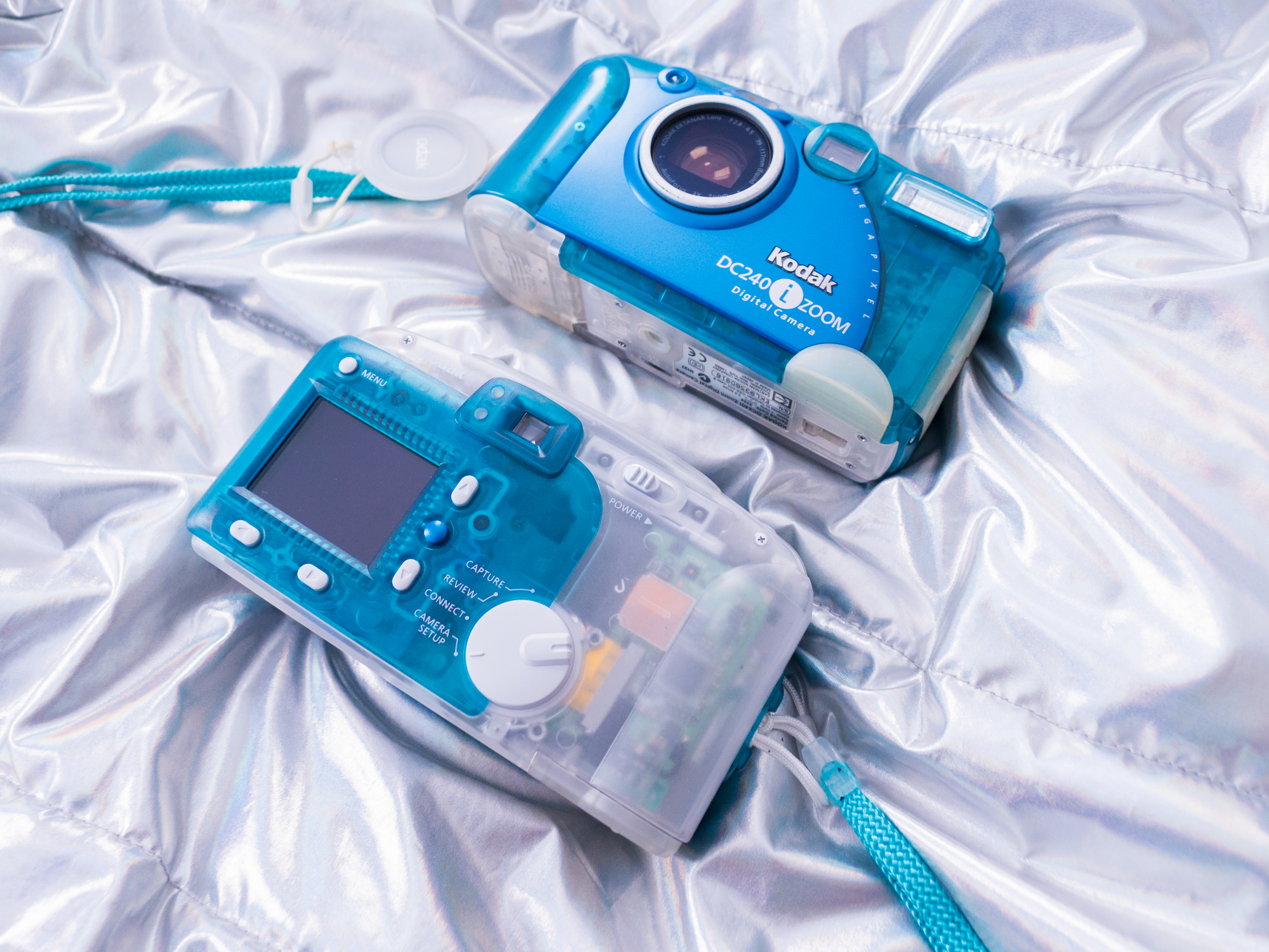
Kodak DC 240i (blueberry)

The Kodak DC240 and DC240i are digital cameras that were manufactured and sold by Kodak during the late 1990s and early 2000s The DC240 was announced on February 26, 1999, and had a resolution of 1.2 megapixels, a 3x optical zoom, and a CompactFlash slot. The DC240i was a limited edition camera that was released in 1999 and was identical to the DC240 but included a skeleton USB and video cable. It was rebadged and re-issued in the style of the iMac G3 and available in the identical five colors as the G3 at this time: blueberry (blue), strawberry (pinkish), lime (green), grape (lilac) and tangerine (orange).

== Full model list ==
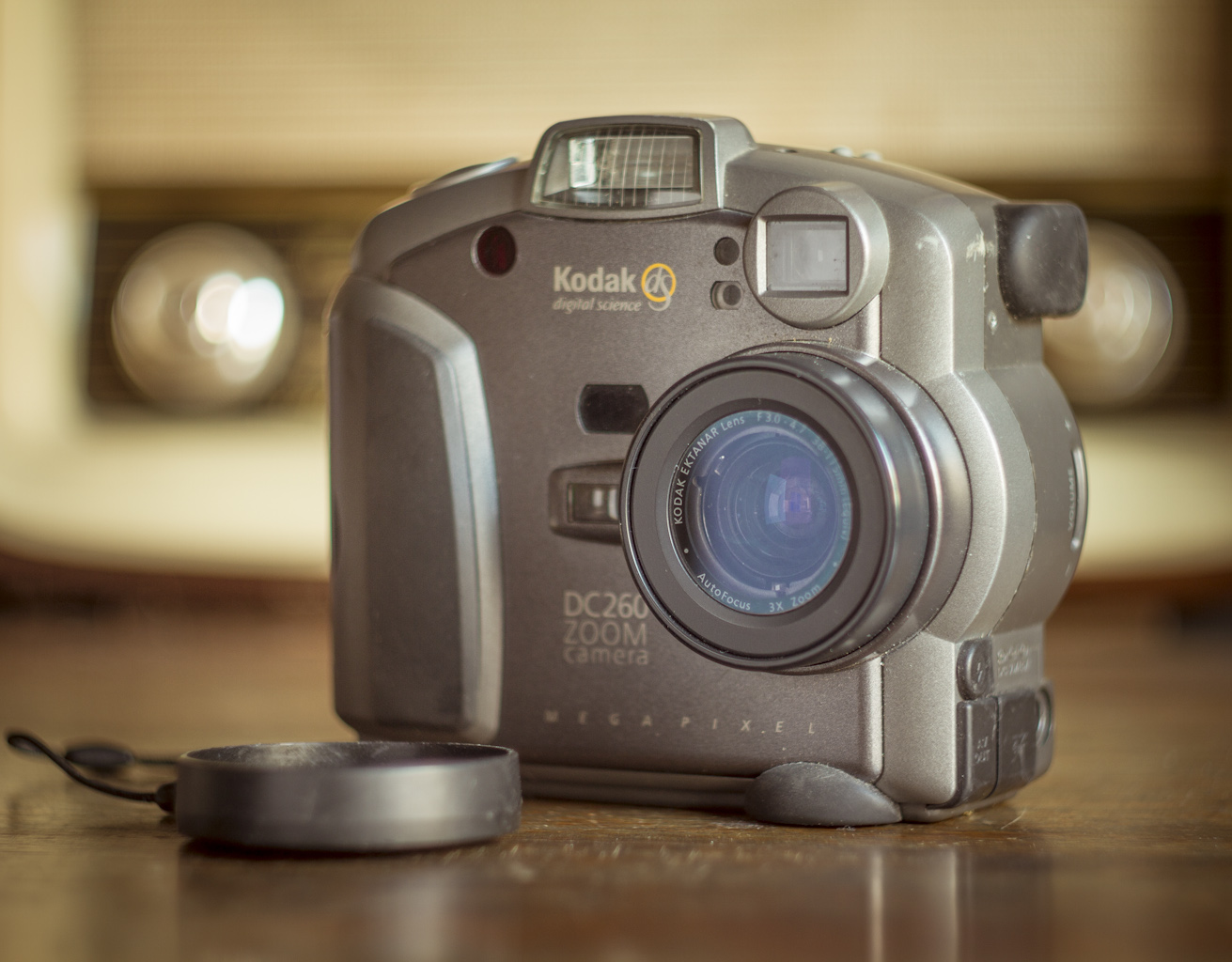
Kodak DC 260

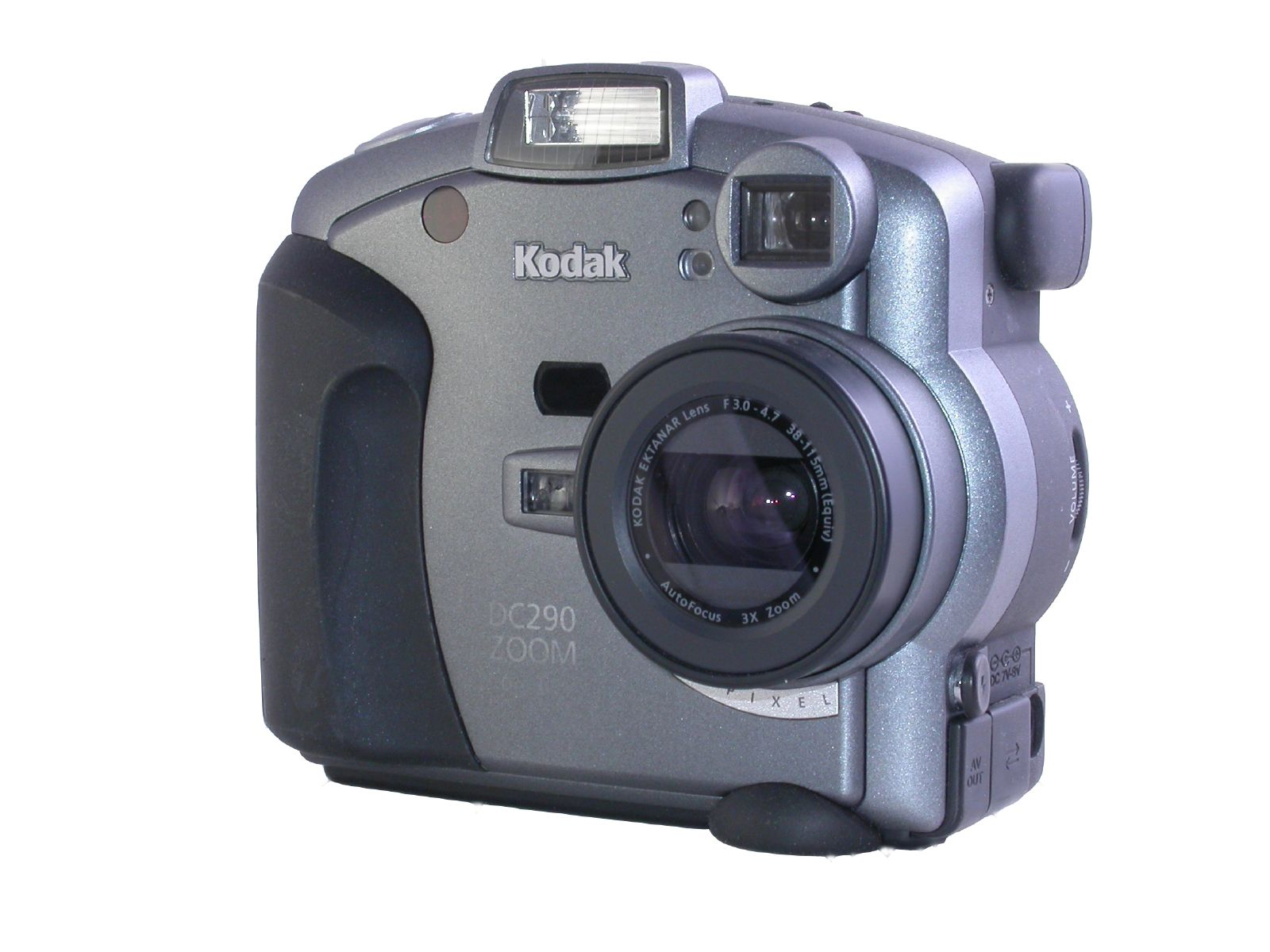
Kodak DC 290

- DC10 — 0.? megapixel, 47 mm equivalent fixed lens
- DC20 — 0.2 megapixel, 47 mm equivalent fixed lens
- DC25 — 0.2 megapixel, 47 mm equivalent fixed lens, CompactFlash slot
- DC40 — 0.38 megapixel, 42 mm equivalent fixed lens f/2.8
- DC50 — 0.38 megapixel, 37–111 mm equivalent lens, PCMCIA slot
- DC120 — 1 megapixel, 38–114 mm equivalent lens, CompactFlash slot
- DC200 — 1 megapixel, 39 mm equivalent fixed lens, CompactFlash slot
- DC200 Plus — 1 megapixel, 39 mm equivalent fixed lens, CompactFlash slot
- DC210 — 1 megapixel, 2x optical zoom lens, CompactFlash slot
- DC210 Plus — 1 megapixel, 2x optical zoom lens, CompactFlash slot
- DC215 — 1 megapixel, 2x zoom lens, CompactFlash slot
- DC220 — 1 megapixel, 29 mm to 58 mm equivalent lens, 2x zoom lens + 2x digital zoom, CompactFlash slot
- DC240 — 1.2 megapixels, 3x optical zoom + 2x digital zoom, CompactFlash slot, announced 26 Feb. 1999
- DC260 — 1.6 megapixels, 3x optical zoom + 2x digital zoom, CompactFlash slot
- DC265 — 1.6 megapixels, 3x optical zoom + 2x digital zoom, CompactFlash slot
- DC280 — 2 megapixels, 2x optical zoom + 3x digital zoom, CompactFlash slot
- DC290 — 2.1 megapixels, 3x optical zoom + 2x digital zoom, CompactFlash slot
- DC3200 — 1.3 megapixels, fixed lens, 2mb internal memory, CompactFlash slot
- DC3400 — 2 megapixels, 2x optical zoom + 3x digital zoom, CompactFlash slot
- DC3800 — 2.1 megapixels, 2x digital zoom (but only usable on lesser quality setting), CompactFlash slot
- DC4800 — 3.1 megapixels, 3x optical zoom + 1x digital zoom, CompactFlash slot
- DC5000 — 2 megapixels, 2x optical zoom + 3x digital zoom, CompactFlash slot, weatherproof rugged camera
