= Kodak DC215 =

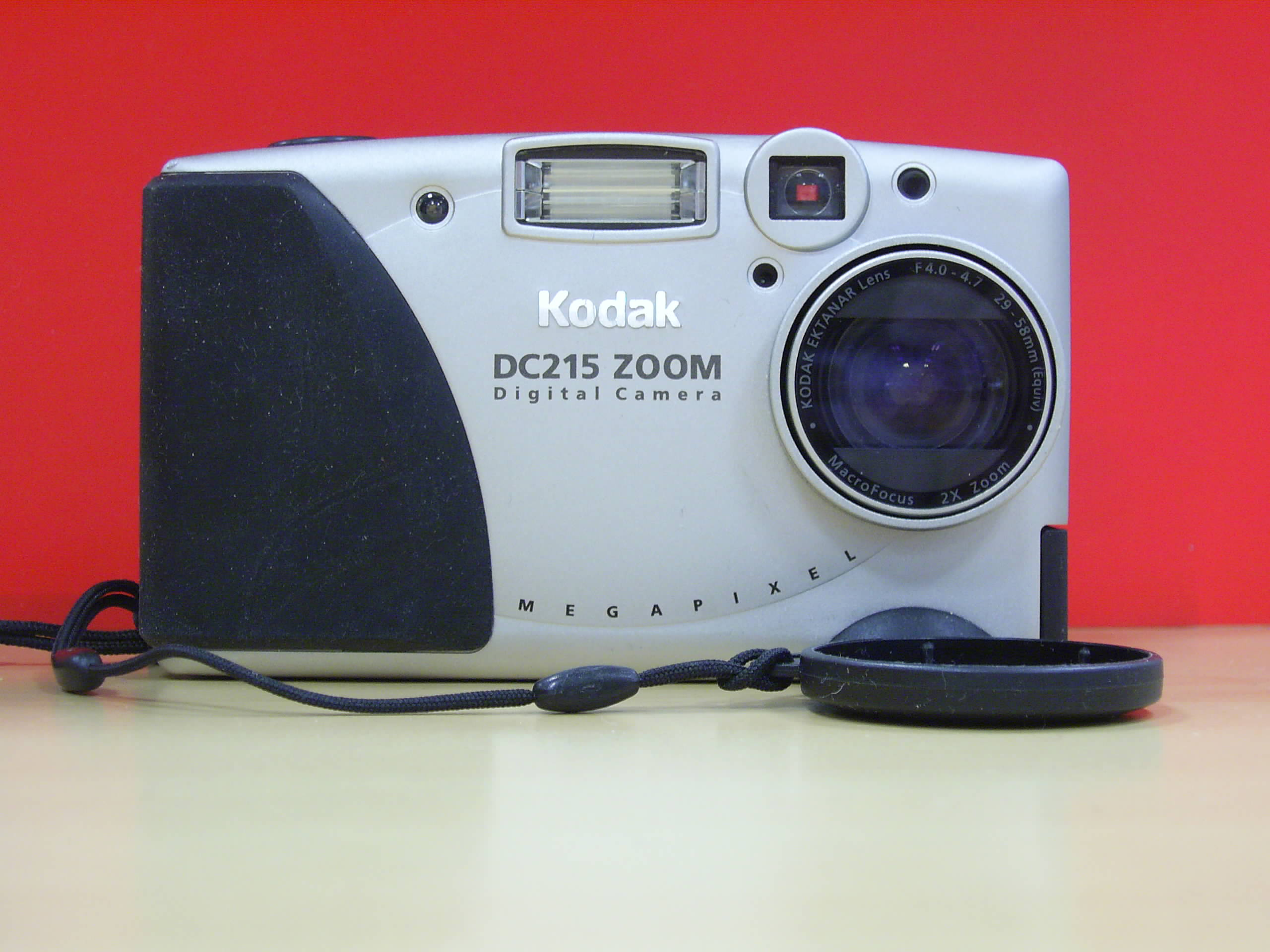
- Maker: Kodak

Lens
- Lens: 29 to 58 mm (equivalent to 35mm camera), 4.4 to 8.8 mm (actual), 2x Optical Zoom and Macro mode

Sensor/medium
- Sensor: CCD
- Maximum resolution: 1 megapixel (1152 x 864 image resolution)
- Film speed: 140 (-2.0 to 2.0 EV in 0.5 EV steps)
- Storage media: CompactFlash I

Focusing
- Focus areas: 3 presets: 0.2m (Macro), 0.5m to infinity (Wide), 1.0m to infinity (Telephoto)

Exposure/metering
- Metering modes: Center-weighted average

Flash
- Flash: Internal. Wide : 1.6 to 9.84 ft (0.49 to 3.00 m); TelePhoto : 3.2 to 8.8 ft (0.98 to 2.68 m). Auto, Fill-In, Off

Shutter
- Shutter speed range: 1/2s - 1/362s

Viewfinder
- Viewfinder: Optical, LCD

Image processing
- White balance: Auto + 3 presets

General
- LCD screen: 1.8" TFT
- Battery: Four AA battery
- Dimensions: 115 x 43.3 x 67.5 mm, 4.5 x 1.7 x 2.7 inch
- Weight: 10.6 oz (300 g) without batteries
- Made in: Japan

The Kodak DC215 is a discontinued model of digital camera produced in Japan by the Eastman Kodak Company. This model does not have internal memory (only CompactFlash I cards), but a 4MB card was supplied with the camera. The camera has a 1-megapixel sensor, a fixed focus lens with 2x optical zoom (F/4 wide, F/4.8 telephoto) and macro-setting and a built-in flash. The viewfinder is optical, but it is possible to use the 1.8" rear LCD monitor as viewfinder ("Preview mode"), though Kodak did not recommend that due to high battery consumption. There was also a small LCD black and white screen on the top of the camera to show camera settings only.

The DC215 also came in a "Millennium Edition" version which had a gold rather than silver case and came with some additional accessories.

The Kodak DC215 had a notorious problem with its battery compartment. This compartment, which takes 4 AA batteries, was made of plastic and broke easily. Consumers often resorted to makeshift solutions like the use of rubber bands or duct tape to keep batteries in the camera.

== See also ==
- Kodak DC Series
