= Lumicera =

Transparent ceramic

Lumicera is a transparent ceramic developed by Murata Manufacturing Co., Ltd.

Murata Manufacturing first developed transparent polycrystalline ceramics in February 2001. This polycrystalline ceramic is a type of dielectric resonator material commonly used in microwaves and millimeter waves. While offering superior electrical properties, high levels of transmissivity, and refractive index, it also has good optical characteristics without birefringence.

Normally, ceramics are opaque because pores are formed at triple points where grains intersect, causing scattering of incident light. Murata has optimized the entire development process of making dense and homogenous ceramics to improve their performance.

Under recommendations from Casio, the material itself has been refined for use in digital camera optical lenses by endowing it with improved transmission of short wavelength light and by reducing pores inside ceramics that reduce transparency.

Lumicera has the same light transmitting qualities as optical glass commonly used in today's conventional camera lenses, however it has a refractive index (nd = 2.08 at 587 nm) much greater than that of optical glass (nd = 1.5 – 1.85) and offers superior strength. The Lumicera Z variant is described as barium oxide based material, not containing any environmentally hazardous materials (e.g. lead).

Lumicera is transparent up to 10 micrometers, making it useful for instruments operating in the mid-infrared spectrum.

Lumicera is a trademark of Murata Manufacturing Co., Ltd.

Lumicera is used in some Casio Exilim cameras, where it allowed 20% reduction of the lens profile.
