= Kodak DC3200 =

Digital camera

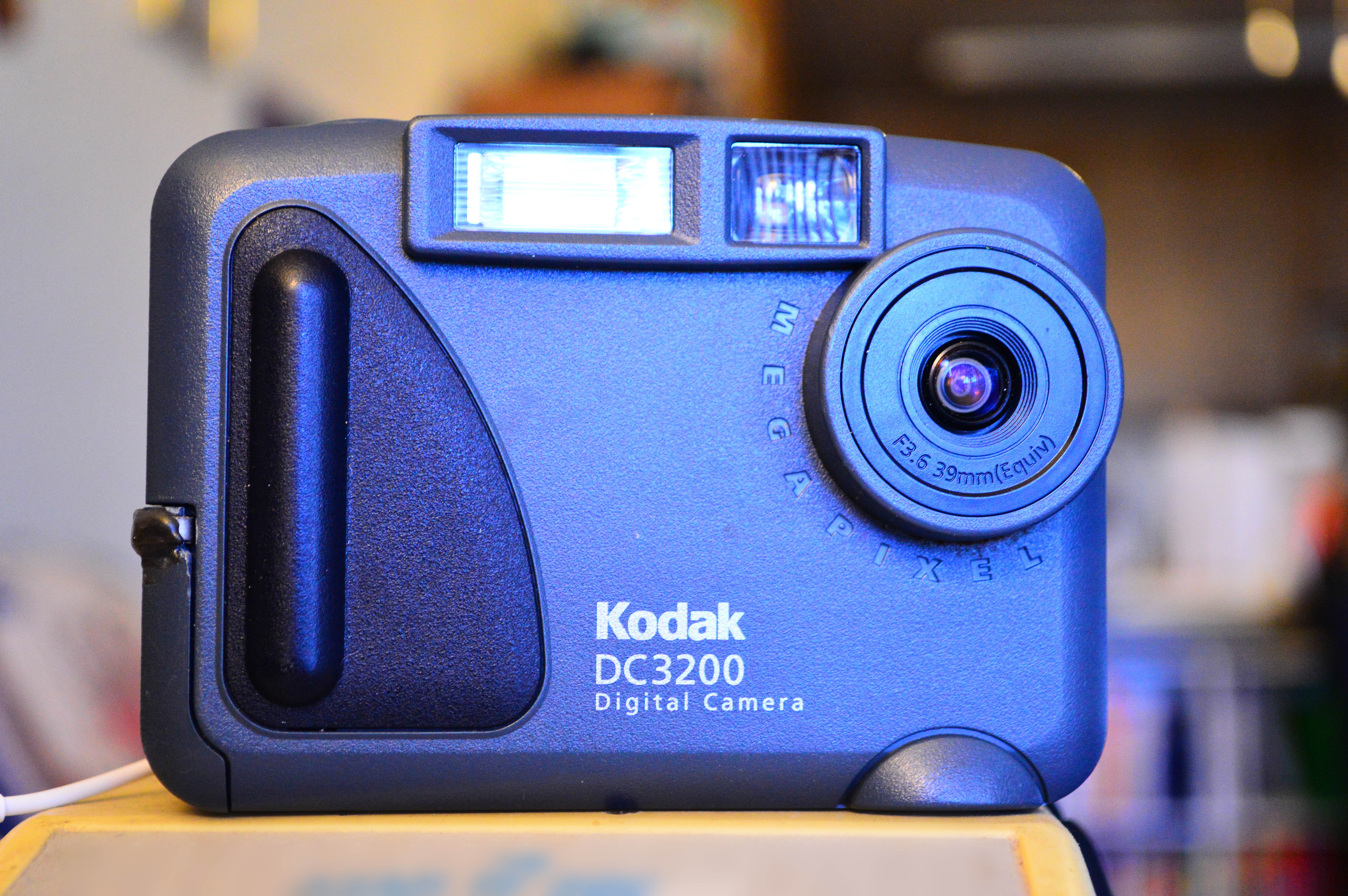

Lens
- Lens: Fixed 39 mm (35 mm equiv.) F3.6

Sensor/medium
- Sensor: CCD
- Maximum resolution: 1152 x 864, 576 x 432
- Storage media: CompactFlash I / 2 MB internal

Flash
- Flash: Internal, 1.4m - 2.4m range; Auto, Fill-In, Off

Shutter
- Shutter: 1/4 s - 1/500 s

Viewfinder
- Viewfinder: Optical

Image processing
- White balance: Auto + 3 presets

General
- LCD screen: 1.6" TFT
- Battery: Four AA battery
- Dimensions: 113 x 81 x 53 mm, 4.45 x 3.1 x 2.1 inch
- Weight: 215 g / 7.6 onces (exc. battery)

The Kodak DC3200 is a model of digital camera produced by the Eastman Kodak Company in 2000–2002.

The camera has 2 MB of internal memory. Memory capacity can be expanded with a CompactFlash card.

A common problem with the DC3200 was that the auto flash was too powerful. Pictures that were taken indoors would often be overexposed.

== See also ==
- Kodak DC Series
