= Casio Exilim =

Brand of digital cameras by Casio

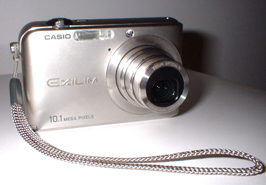
Casio Exilim EX-Z1000, the first compact digital camera to reach the 10 megapixel mark

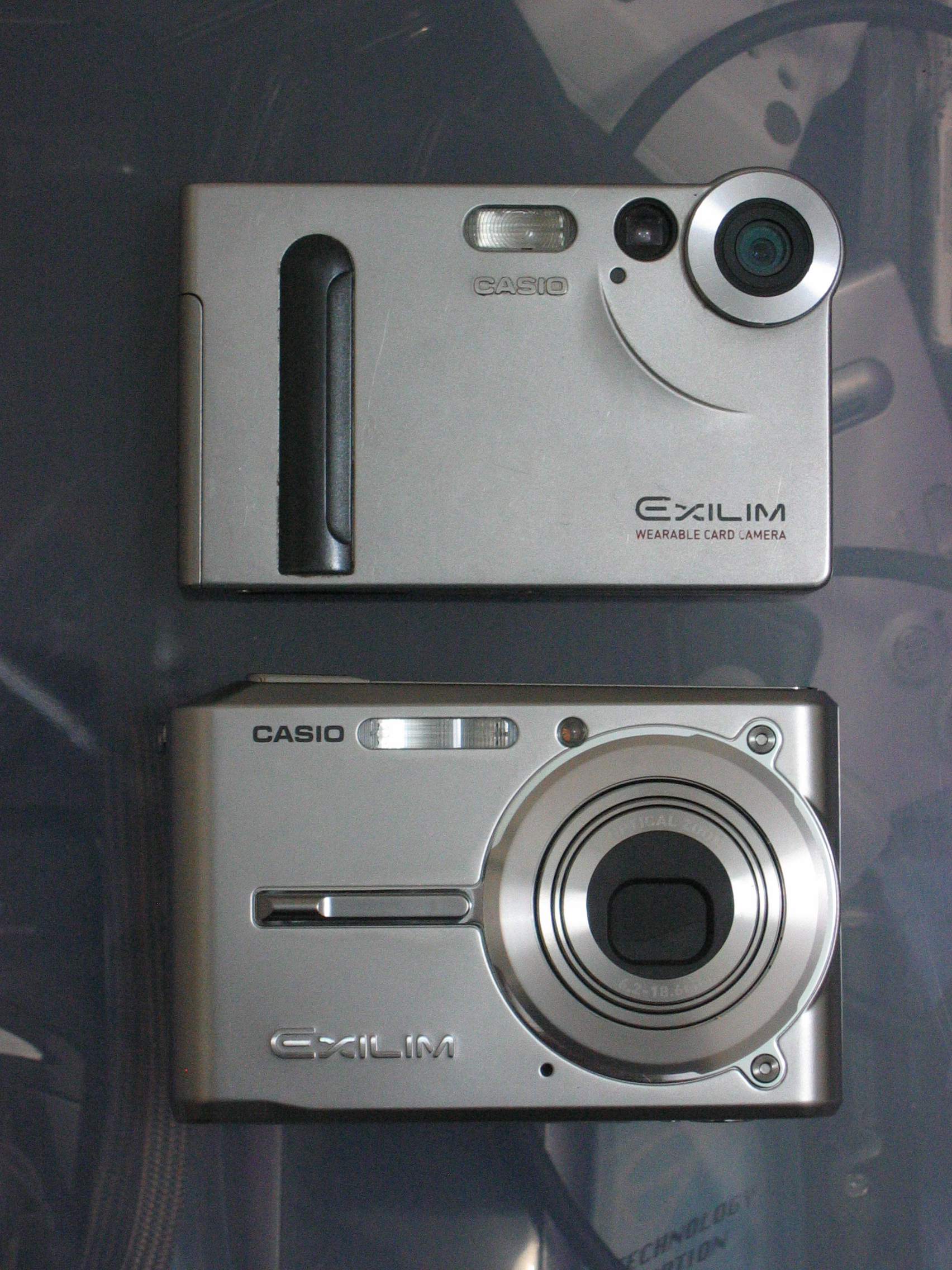
EX-S1 and EX-S600 compared

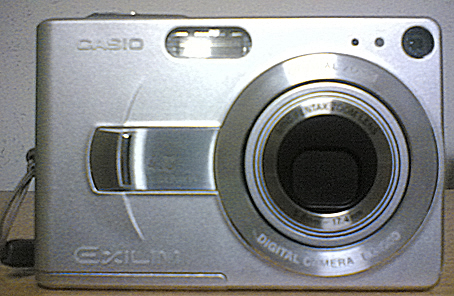
EX-Z40

Exilim is a brand of digital cameras produced by Casio from 2002 to 2018.

The Exilim Card series was notably thinner than other small digital cameras at the time of its introduction, typically 10–15 millimetres thick compared to other manufacturers' comparable models that were 25–35 millimeters thick. This sparked competition to make slimmer compact digital cameras, with other manufacturers bringing out lines of comparably thin cameras from 2004.

Many Exilim models also followed the golden ratio in their design. This mathematical proportion, often found in nature and art, was subtly incorporated into the cameras' dimensions, giving them a visually pleasing and balanced appearance.

On April 24, 2018, Casio ceased the production of its digital cameras, including the Exilim brand following the loss of some 500 million yen for the fiscal year that ended in March 2017.

== Features ==
The Exilim Card series are ultra-compact models. The cameras were first branded as "Wearable Card Cameras" and are about the size of a credit card and 9 mm-16 mm thick. The early models only had digital zoom, though more recent models have optical zoom as well.

The Exilim Zoom series is the all-purpose line, all including an optical zoom. Several newer models support H.264 video compression which uses much less storage than Motion JPEG format.

The Exilim Professional is the bridge digital camera line, with higher-quality optics and greater zoom.

All models use Secure Digital (SD) or Multi Media Card (MMC). They come with a small amount of internal memory and are not bundled with a memory card. Many Exilim cameras come with a bundled charging and docking cradle. The cradle is used to recharge the camera's battery and to connect the camera to a PC or PictBridge compatible printer.

Images are recorded as JPEGs with Exif data. Raw images from the CCD are not available by default, though on some models a service menu can be accessed allowing images to be recorded as the raw data.

The cameras use a Casio "proprietary" lithium ion battery. All the later models have 2.5" or wider LCD screens and come with more than 20 shooting modes.

=== MPEG-4 video with H.264 compression ===
In 2007, several Exilim models introduced support for highly compressed H.264 video in 848×480(HQ Wide), 640×480(HQ/Normal), 320×240(LP) modes. One benefit of H.264 is that it uses much less storage than Motion JPEG, a widely used video format for consumer digital cameras. However, videos are deliberately limited to 10 minutes in China, DI, and EU, because of customs import tariffs discriminating between picture and movie cameras.

Exilim models such as the EX-Z1200 that incorporate MPEG-4 video benefit from extended recording times due to higher quality compression. On "normal" quality, MPEG-4 allows more than an hour of 640×480, 30frame/s video to be recorded on a 1 GB memory card.

=== High-speed photography ===
Some cameras allow high-speed photography. The EX-FC100 and EX-FS10 allow taking short bursts of 30 pictures per second and shooting video up to 1000 frames per second, the EX-FH20 offers bursts of 40 pictures per second and 1000 frame/s video, and the EX-F1 offers bursts of 60 pictures per second and video of 1200 frame/s. However, the resolution of the video decreases drastically with increasing speed; in case of EX-F1, 300 frame/s are at 512×384 pixels, 600 frame/s at 432×192, and 1200 frame/s at 336×96. The burst shots are at full resolution. The EX-FC100 records 480×360 at 210 frame/s, 224×168 at 420 frame/s, and 224×64 at 1,000 frame/s. The Casio EX-FH25 is able to shoot at up to 1,000 frame/s at 224×64.

== Bundled software ==
- PhotoLoader — Casio's software to automatically copy pictures to a hard drive.
- Photohands — Casio's image editing software. Photohands allows rotation and resizing of images and print a picture with the date superimposed.
- Camera User's Guide — the manual for the camera.
- Adobe Acrobat Reader — to read the Camera User's Guide, which is a PDF.
- AVI Importer
- Ulead Movie Wizard — used for editing movies software (bundled with the EX-Z750, EX-V7 and EX-Z850).
- Dynamic Photo Manager — Used to view and edit dynamic photos

== Table of models ==
Cameras whose model number ends in U (e.g. EX-Z4U) are models only released in North America, without some of the functions of the non-U models.

M models are based on the corresponding S model but also record audio (as WAV) and play back WAV and MP3.

Casio's NP-20 batteries are claimed to hold 700 mAh of charge, while the thicker NP-40 is rated for 1230 mAh and the NP-90 has 1700mAh..

Model	Announcement date	Sensor (effective pixels)	Lens (35 mm equiv), optical zoom	Battery	Size (mm), weight (inc batt)	Photo	Notes
EX-S1	2002	1.3MP (1280×960), 1/2.7"	37 mm, f/2.5	NP-20	×11.3 mm		
EX-M1	2002	1.3MP (1280×960), 1/2.7"	37 mm, f/2.5	NP-20			EX-S1 with audio recording and MP3 playback
EX-S2	2002	2MP (1600×1200), 1/1.8"	36 mm, f/3.2	NP-20			
EX-M2	2002	2MP (1600×1200), 1/1.8"	36 mm, f/3.2	NP-20			EX-S2 with audio and MP3
EX-Z3	January 2003	3MP (2048×1536), 1/2.5"	35–105 mm, f/2.6-4.8 (3×)	NP-20	87 × 67 × 23 mm, 146 g		
EX-S3	March 2003	3MP, 1/1.8"	35 mm, f/4.2	NP-20	90 × 57 × 12 mm		
EX-S20(U)	August 2003	2MP (1600×1200), 1/2.7"	37 mm, f/3.5	NP-20	83 × 53 × 11 mm		Macro
EX-M20(U)	August 2003	2MP (1600×1200), 1/2.7"	37 mm, f/3.5	NP-20	83 × 53 × 11 mm		EX-S20(U) with audio and MP3, headphones and wired remote control
EX-Z4	August 2003	4MP	(3×)	NP-20			
EX-Z4(U)	August 2003	4MP	(3×)	NP-20			EX-Z4U (North America) has no video functions
EX-Z30	February 2004	3MP	(3×)	NP-40			PictBridge
EX-Z40	February 2004	4MP	(3×)	NP-40			PictBridge
EX-P600	February 2004	6MP	(4×) Canon branded	NP-40			TIFF, PictBridge, infrared remote, manual controls
EX-S100	August 2004	3MP, 1/3.2"	36–102 mm, f/4.0-6.6 (2.8×)	NP-20			Lumicera ceramic lens, PictBridge
EX-Z50	August 2004	5MP	(3×)	NP-40			PictBridge
EX-P700	August 2004	7MP (3072×2304), 1/1.8"	33–132 mm, f/2.8-4.0 (4×) Canon branded	NP-40	98 × 68 × 45 mm, 261 g		TIFF, PictBridge, infrared remote, manual controls
EX-Z55	August 2004	5MP	(3×)	NP-40			PictBridge
EX-P505	January 2005	5MP (2560×1920) 1/2.5"	38–190 mm, f/3.3-3.6 (5×)	NP-40			MPEG-4, supermacro (1 cm), PastMovie, PictBridge, swivel LCD, manual controls.
EX-Z750	February 2005	7.2MP (3072×2304), 1/1.8"	38–114 mm, f/2.8-5.1 (3×)	NP-40	89 × 59 × 22 mm, 165 g		PictBridge, MPEG-4, manual controls
EX-Z57	February 2005	5MP	(3×)	NP-40			PictBridge, 2.7" LCD
EX-S500	June 2005	5MP, 1/2.5"	38–114 mm, f/2.7-5.2 (3×)	NP-20	90 × 59 × 16.1 mm		Anti Shake DSP, PictBridge, MPEG4
EX-Z500	August 2005	5MP	(3×)	NP-40			PictBridge, MJPEG movie, Anti Shake DSP
EX-Z10	August 2005	5MP	(3×)	AA			PictBridge, MJPEG movie, manual controls
EX-Z110	August 2005	6MP	(3×)	AA			PictBridge, MJPEG movie, manual controls
EX-Z120	August 2005	7.2MP CCD-Sensor 1/1,8"	38–114 mm, f/2.8-5.1 (3×)	AA	90 × 60 × 27.2mm		PictBridge, MJPEG movie, manual controls
EX-S600	October 2005	6MP, 1/2.5"	38–114 mm, f/2.7-5.2 (3×)	NP-20	90 × 59 × 16.1 mm		Anti Shake DSP, PictBridge, MPEG4, 8Gb+ SDHC (with firmware 1.02)
EX-Z600	January 2006	6MP	(3×)	NP-40			PictBridge, MJPEG movie, Super Bright LCD
EX-Z60	February 2006	6MP	(3×)	NP-20			Anti Shake DSP, PictBridge, MJPEG movie
EX-Z850	February 2006	8.0MP (3264×2448), 1/1.8"	38–114 mm, f/2.8-5.1 (3×)	NP-40	89 × 58.5 × 23.7 mm, 185 g		PictBridge, MPEG-4, Super Bright LCD, movie light, manual controls
EX-Z5	April 2006	5MP (2560×1920), 1/2.5"	38–114 mm, f/3.1-4.4 (3×)	NP-20	95.2 × 60.6 × 19.8 mm, 119 g (-batt)		MJPEG, Anti Shake DSP
EX-Z1000	April 2006	10.1MP (3648×2736), 1/1.8"	38–114 mm, f/2.8-5.4 (3×)	NP-40	92 × 58.4 × 22.4 mm, 185 g		First true 10MP compact digital camera
EX-Z70	June 2006	7MP	(3×)	NP-20	95.2 × 60.6 × 19.8 mm, 118 g		Anti Shake DSP, PictBridge, MJPEG movie, SDHC (with firmware 1.01)
EX-Z700	August 2006	7MP (3072×2304), 1/2.5"	38–114 mm, f/2.7-4.3 (3×)	NP-40	88.5 × 57 × 20.5 mm, 112 g (no batt)		PictBridge, MJPEG , SDHC (with firmware 1.01)
EX-S770	August 2006	7MP (3072×2304), 1/2.5"	38–114 mm, f/2.7-5.2 (3×)	NP-20	95 × 60 × 17 mm, 127 g (no batt)		PictBridge, MPEG-4
EX-V7	January 2007	7MP (3072×2304), 1/2.5"	38–266 mm, f/3.4-5.3 (7×)	NP-50	95.5 × 59.8 × 25.1 mm, 149 g (no batt)		7× zoom, CCD shift IS, MJPEG, H.264, SDHC
EX-Z75	January 2007	7MP (3072×2304), 1/2.5"	38–114 mm, f/3.1-4.4 (3×)	NP-20	95.4 × 60.6 × 19.6 mm, 122 g (no batt)		MJPEG, SDHC
EX-Z1050	January 2007	10.1MP (3648×2736), 1/1.75"	38–114 mm, f/2.8-8.0 (3×)	NP-40	91.1 × 57.2 × 24.2 mm, 125 g (no batt)		2.6" LCD, MJPEG, 7frame/s high-speed continuous shooting, up to ISO800 sensitivity
EX-Z11	March 2007	7.2MP (3072x2304)	38-114 mm, f/3.1-F5.9 (3x)	NP-20	95 x 61 x 20 mm, 122g (no batt)		2.6" LCD.
EX-Z1200	May 2007	12.1MP, 1/1.7"	3×	NP-40			2.8" LCD, H.264 video, CCD shift IS
EX-Z77	July 2007	7.2MP (3072 × 2304), 1/2.5"	38–114 mm, f/3.1-5.9 (3×)	NP-20	95 × 59 × 20 mm, 118 g		2.6" LCD, H.264 video (YouTube-optimized), WAV, silver, black, blue, pink, white, red
EX-S880	July 2007	8.1MP, 1/2.5"	3×	NP-20	94.5 × 60.4 × 17.3 mm, 128 g		2.8" LCD, H.264 video (YouTube-optimized), silver, black, red
EX-V8	August 2007	8.1MP (3264×2448), 1/2.5"	38–266 mm, f/3.4-5.3, 7×	NP-50	95.5 × 59.8 × 25.5 mm, 149 g		
EX-Z1080	August 2007	10.1MP (3648×2736), 1/1.75"	38–114 mm, f/2.8-5.1, 3×	NP-40	91.1 × 57.2 × 24.2 mm, 125 g		
EX-Z12	late 2007?	7.2MP (3072 × 2304), 1/2.5"	38–114 mm, f/3.1-5.9 (3×)	NP-20	95 × 59 × 20 mm, 118 g		2.6" LCD, H.264 video (YouTube-optimized), WAV, silver. Specification and manual content appears identical to EX-Z77
EX-S10	January 2008	10.1MP (3648 × 2736), 1/2.3"	36–108 mm, f/6.3-18.9	NP-60	94 × 54 × 15 mm		
EX-Z80	January 2008	8.1MP (3264 × 2448), 1/2.5"	38–114 mm, f/3.1-5.3	NP-60	89.7 × 51.7 × 19 mm		
EX-Z100	January 2008	10.1MP (3648 × 2736), 1/2.3"	28–112 mm, f/2.6-5.8	NP-40	93 × 55 × 21.2 mm		
EX-Z200	January 2008	10.1MP (3648 × 2736), 1/2.3"	28–112 mm, f/2.6-5.8	NP-40	93 × 55 × 22.7 mm		EX-Z100 with CCD shift IS
Pro EX-F1	January 2008	6.6MP (2816 × 2112), 1/1.8"	36–432 mm, f/2.7-4.6 (12×)	NP-100	127.7 × 79.6 × 130.1 mm		High speed camera: Max. 60 frame/s as camera, first Exilim to use CMOS, 1,200 frame/s as video.
EX-Z9	March 2008	8.1MP (3264 × 2448), 1/2.5"	37.5-112.5 mm, f/2.8-5.2	NP-60	92 × 55 × 23 mm		
EX-FH20	October 2008	9.1MP (3456 × 2592), 1/2.3"	26–520 mm, f/2.8-4.5 (20×)	NP-60	123 × 81 × 85 mm, 483 g		
EX-Z29	March 2009	10.1MP (3648 × 2736), 1/2.5"	37.5 - 112.5 mm, f/2.8-x	NP-60	101 × 57 × 23 mm, 130 g		
EX-S12	April 2009	12.1MP (4000×3000), 1/2.3"	36-108mm f/2.8-5.3	NP-60	94.2 × 54.6 × 14.9mm, 117g		2.7" LCD, non-mechanical (software) image stabilisation, HD video recording (1280×720)
EX-H10	June 2009	12MP (4000 × 3000), 1/2.3"	24–240 mm, f/3.2-5.7	NP-90	102.5 × 62 × 24.3 mm, 164 g		
EX-Z450	August 2009	12.1MP		NP-40			
EX-Z90	October 2009	12MP (4000 × 3000), 1/2.3"	35-105mm, f6.3-18.9	NP-60	89.7 × 51.7 × 19.4 mm		
EX-G1	December 2009	12.1MP	6.66-19.98mm, f3.9-5.4	NP-80			shock and waterproof
EX-FH100	January 2010	10MP (3648 × 2736), 1/2.3"	24–240 mm f/3.2-5.7	NP-90	105 × 63.2 × 29.9mm, 227g		1000 frame/s (33× slower than realtime) video, RAW DNG output, 10× optical zoom
EX-H15	January 2010	14.1MP		NP-90			
EX-Z2000	January 2010	14.1MP		NP-110			
EX-Z550	January 2010	14.1MP		NP-80			
EX-S200	August 2010	14.1MP (4320 × 3240), 1/2.3"	27-108mm (4.2-19.6mm)	NP-90	100.1 × 55.3 × 17.8mm, 132g		2.7" LCD, mechanical image stabilisation, HD video recording (1280×720)
EX-ZR100	January 2011	12.1MP (4000 × 3000), 1/2.3"	24-300mm (4.24-53.0mm), f/3.0-5.9	NP-130	105 × 59 × 29mm, 204g		3.0" 460k LCD, HD video recording (1920×1080@30)
EX-ZR200	January 2012	16.1MP, 1/2.3"	24-300mm (4.24-53.0mm), F3.0(W)-5.9(T)	NP-130	104.8 × 59.1 × 28.6mm, 205g (with battery and memory card)		3.0" TFT color LCD, FHD video recording (1920×1080@30fps)
EX-N5	February 2013	16.1MP, 1/2.3"	26-156 mm (4.6-27.6 mm), F3.5(W)-6.5(T)	NP-80	98.5 × 58.2 × 22.3 mm, 129 g		available in white, black, red, and silver
EX-100	March 2014	12MP, 1/1.7"	28-300mm (10.7×) equivalent 35mm film format, F2.8 constant widest aperture	NP-130A	119.9 × 67.9 × 50.5 mm, 389 g		Dual-bracketing of 9 images with 2 parameters of white balance, exposure, focus, color saturation, and shutter speed, 5-axis image stabilisation, 3.5inch tilting screen, FullHD Video with stereo sound, Manual controls, AdobeDNG raw shooting, Control ring around lens, Electronic level, 6fps continuous AF shooting, Wi-Fi built in, Time-lapse, All-in-focus macro, 1000fps high speed video (at reduced resolution)
EX-Z33		10.1MP, 1/2.3"	35-106mm equivalent 35mm film format, F3.1 to F5.6	NP-82	94.1 × 56.1 × 18.1 mm, 102 g		
Model	Announcement date	Sensor (effective pixels)	Lens (35 mm equiv), optical zoom	Battery	Size (mm), weight (inc batt)	Photo	Notes

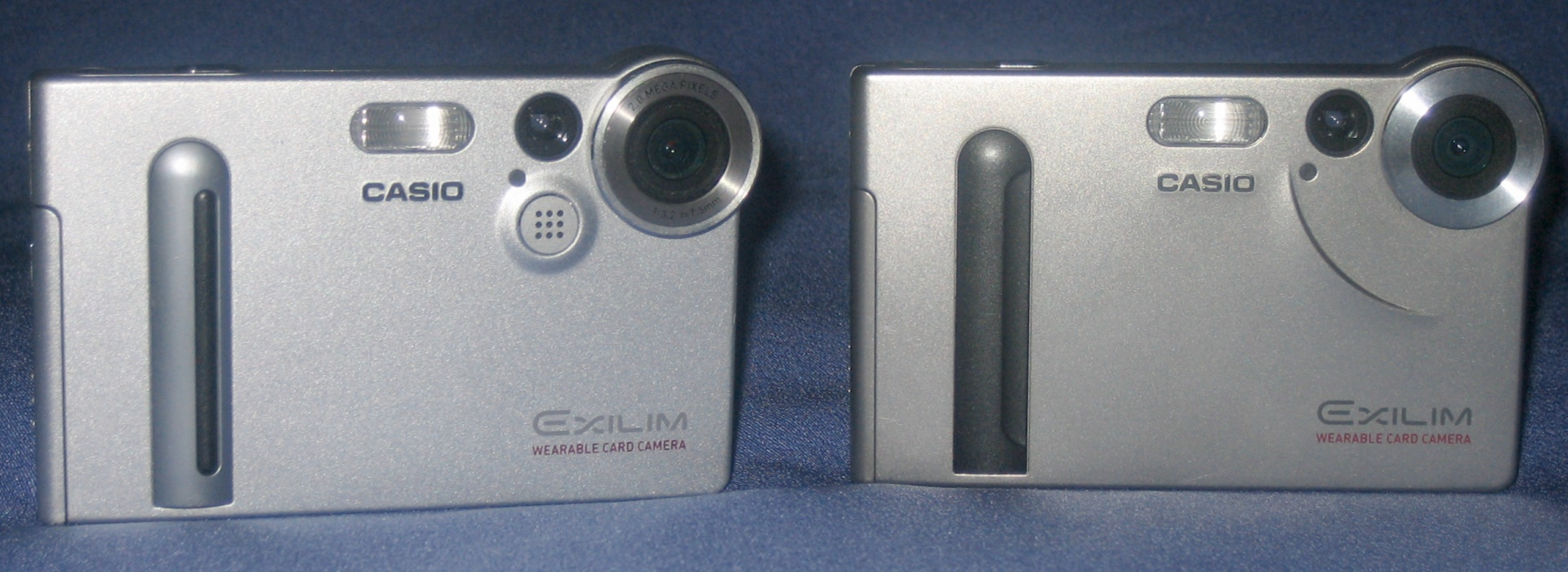
EX-M2 and EX-S2.
