= Alameda County (California) Women's Hall of Fame =

Women's Hall of Fame in Alameda County, California

The Alameda County, California Women's Hall of Fame has existed since 1993. It is overseen by the Alameda County Board of Supervisors, and members of the "Commission on the Status of Women". Nomination categories include athletes, community builders, youth, environmentalists, philanthropy. The Sandia National Laboratories in Livermore has produced a number of inductees in the science and engineering fields. Many of the inductees listed here are in law enforcement, or legal assistance careers. Their website claims in excess of 250 inductees. The list includes community builders from a wide spectrum of cultural backgrounds. Ceremonies to announce the latest class of inductees usually occurs in the spring of every year.

== 2026 ==
- Tamara Chao, Philanthropy.
- Angela Davis, Justice.
- Tammeil Gilkerson, Education.
- Noreen King, Science, Technology, Engineering.
- Monica Lau, Community Service.
- April Luckett-Fahimi, Non-Traditional Careers.
- Fredrika Newton, Culture & Art.
- Ohemaa Nyanin, Sports & Athletics.
- Harsha Ramchandani, Health.
- Joan Seppala, Business & Professions.

== 2025 ==
- Tiffany Allen-Vargas, Sports & Athletics.
- Anne Bakar, Health.
- Bella Comelo, Justice.
- Melanie Dulbecco, Business & Professions.
- Lori Fogarty, Culture & Art.
- Bisa Grant, Non-Traditional Careers.
- Renee Herzfeld, Education.
- Brandi Howard, Philanthropy.
- Monya Lane, Science, Technology & Engineering.
- Jennifer Pett-Ridge, Environment.
- Maithri Venkat, Emerging Leaders.
- Diane Wong, Community Service.

== 2024 ==
- Noha Aboelata, Founding CEO of Roots Community Health in Oakland.
- Alison Barakat, "Bakesale Betty" restaurant owner.
- Elaine Brown, Former Black Panther Party leader, social justice activist and author. CEO of the Oakland & the World Enterprises, Inc.
- Courtenay Carr Heuer, Co-Founder and Executive Director of Scientific Adventures for Girls.
- Dianne Fukami, Documentary and television producer and director for Bridge Media.
- Dee Johnson (Alameda County), Founder of Lend A Hand Foundation.
- Kyla Johnson-Trammell, Superintendent of Oakland Unified School District.
- Dominique Mellion, Nurse and Executive Director of Families United for Equity.
- Bethany Zummo, Paralympic volleyball player.

== 2023 ==
- Zuhal Bahaduri, Healthcare business analyst and founder of The 5ive Pillars Organization.
- Stephanie Y. Brown, Emergency Medicine Physician and Clinical Lead for the Sutter Health Institute for Advancing Health Equity.
- Noor Dharni, Youth mental health advocate.
- Corrina Gould, Tribal Chair for the Confederated Villages of Lisjan Nation and co-founder of the Sogorea Te' Land Trust.
- Patricia Hendricks, Aikido teacher and founder of Aikido of San Leandro.
- Tanya Moore, Activist for women in STEM. Developer of the Infinite Possibilities Conference and founder of Intersecting Lines.
- Elsa Ortiz, Champion of environmental policy on the AC Transit Board of Directors.
- Davida Scott, Teacher at the Hayward Adult School and founder of the Raising Leaders program.
- Elizabeth Shaughnessy, Chess champion; founder of the Berkeley Chess School.
- Maya Shiroyama, Retired owner of Oakland's Kitazawa Seed Company.
- Darlene Vendegna, Bay Area sports coach and Oakland's USA Pickleball Association Ambassador. Founder of pickleball club at Bushrod Park.
- Anna Wang (Alameda County), Co-founder and vice president of Friends of Children with Special Needs.
- Angela Wellman, Founder of the Oakland Public Conservatory of Music.

== 2020 ==
- Jean Bjork, Owner and President of Bjork Construction Company.
- Cynthia Carey-Grant, Health care advocate and executive.
- Susan A. Cota, Chancellor and vice president of numerous colleges.
- Valeria Cruz, Student advocate for children and families.
- Reign Free, CEO of Red Door Catering.
- Nazineen Kandahari, UCSF medical student.
- Nicole Kyauk, Philanthropist.
- Teri McKeever, American college and Olympic swimming coach.
- Rashim Mogha, executive for multiple technology companies, and founder of "eWOW Empowered Women of the World" initiative active in approximately 50 countries. Mogha's leadership positions at technology companies has included Automation Anywhere, Oracle, Amazon Web Services, and VMware. Recognized as a woman to watch by Business Chief USA, Rashim has built high-performing teams to support over $2 billion businesses.
- Fatemeh Shirazi, Founder, Chief Executive Officer & Chief Technology Officer of Microvi Biotech Inc.
- Sonya L. Smallets, Partner of legal firm Minnis & Smallets LLP.
- Judith Smith (Alameda County), Co-Founder and Director Emerita of AXIS Dance Company.

== 2019 ==
- Thi Bui – Vietnam-born American graphic novelist and illustrator.
- Margaret Dixon, chairs the Administration of Justice department at Merritt College.
- Maria G. Hernandez, president of Impact4Health.
- Susan Hubbard, Ph.D., Associate Laboratory Director for Earth and Environmental Sciences at the Lawrence Berkeley National Laboratory.
- Teri Johnson, James Logan High School phys-ed teacher and girls' softball coach, helping them gain 22 Mission Valley Athletic League titles.
- Kimberly Larson, Alameda County firefighter who mentors other women for fire fighting careers.
- Erica Mackie, co-founder and CEO of Oakland-based GRID Alternatives, the nation’s largest nonprofit solar installer.
- Spojmie Nasiri, immigration attorney.
- Kristin Groos Richmond, co-founder and CEO of Revolution Foods.
- Peggy Saika, Interim CEO of Common Counsel.
- Laura Savio, Youth category, helped plan Fremont’s first Youth Empowerment Summit.
- Moina Shaiq, community service.
- Akemi Williams, Youth category, volunteer in numerous community programs.

== 2018 ==
- Beena Ammanath, AI managing director with Deloitte Consulting LLP, and shaped the use of Artificial Intelligence, data and analytics.
- Hilary Bass, Executive Director at Alameda County Deputy Sheriffs' Activities League.
- Amanda Berger, Advocate for criminal justice reform.
- Nicole Curran, Board President of the Warriors Community Foundation, the charitable arm of the Golden State Warriors.
- Janet A. Liang, executive vice president, group president and chief operating officer, care delivery, for Kaiser Foundation Health Plan, Inc. and Hospitals.
- Trina Ostrander, champion of Science, technology, engineering, and mathematics.
- Roxana Perez, Youth category, Chair of the Oakland Youth Advisory Commission.
- Rona Popal, Afghan women’s rights proponent.
- Liisa Pine Schoonmaker, Chair of the welding department at Laney College.
- Shonda Scott, creator and CEO of 360 Total Concept management consulting firm.
- Leilani Shaffer, Special Olympics of Northern California volunteer coach and team manager.
- Winda I. Shimizu, Executive Director of the Hayward Arts Council.
- Wendy Sommer, retired Executive Director of StopWaste recycling agency.

== 2017 ==
- Patricia Aguilera, retired CFO of La Clinica De La Raza.
- Suzan Bateson, Executive Director of the Alameda County Community Food Bank.
- Kathie Barkow, co-creator of the Alameda County Homeless and Caring Court.
- Aeeshah Clottey, co-founder of Attitudinal Healing Connection, an Oakland nonprofit designed to stem community violence.
- Catherine (Suárez) Dunbar, Spanish instructor at Las Positas College.
- Emily Kirsch, Co-founder and CEO of Powerhouse.
- Linda Mandolini, President of Hayward-based Eden Housing Inc.
- Lauryn Nguyen, Youth category, community service.
- Ayodele Nzinga, Poet Laureate of Oakland.
- Hel Say, Sports and Athletics.
- Audrey Yamamoto, Executive Director of the Asian Pacific Fund.
- Katherine Yelick.

== 2016 ==
- Suzanne Barba, community service.
- Marcia Blackstock, Executive Director of Bay Area Women Against Rape (BAWAR).
- Jacqueline Chen, Science, Technology, Engineering.
- Stephanie Couch, Institute for STEM Education at Cal State East Bay.
- Sarah Crowell, Artistic Director of the Destiny Arts Center in North Oakland.
- Quinn Delaney, philanthropist founder and board chair of Akonadi Foundation.
- Leora Feeney, Golden Gate Audubon Society.
- Aloysia Rochon Fouché, CEO and owner of Fouch'’s Hudson Funeral Home.
- Lizbeth Hernandez, Youth category.
- Gail D. Hunter, vice president of public affairs and event management with the World Champion Golden State Warriors.
- Victoria Jones (business), vice president of corporate affairs for The Clorox Company.
- Tina Raine-Bennett, senior research scientist and staff physician with Kaiser Permanente.

== 2015 ==
- Peggy Bristol, immigration attorney.
- Jenny Fang, environmentalist.
- Gladys Green, community service.
- Sherry Hu, culture and arts.
- Farmaan Judge, Youth category.
- Michelle Smith McDonald, sports journalist and author.
- Shirley Nelson, banking and finance.
- Ann Petru, Co-Director of Infectious Diseases at UCSF Benioff Children's Hospital Oakland.
- Bobbi Silten, philanthropist.
- Elñora T. Webb, president and chief executive officer for Laney College, later to become CEO of Signature Solutions Corporate Results LLC.
- Rhonda Wood (wine maker), aviator and winemaker.
- Natalya Zaitseva, staff physicist in the Condensed Matter and Materials Division at Lawrence Livermore National Laboratory.

== 2014 ==
- Monica Anderson (California), sex trafficking survivor advocate at the Bay Area-based Survivors Healing, Advising and Dedicated to Empowerment Project.
- Arlene Blum, mountaineer, writer, Environmental health scientist.
- Carol Brown (Alameda County), Health Care Program for Children in Foster Care.
- Sallie T. Carey, Community service.
- Deborah Ale Flint, Aviation Director at the Port of Oakland.
- Katherine Dunphy Guzman, Senior Engineer at Sandia National Laboratories in Livermore.
- SiLin Huang, Youth category.
- Jennifer Krill, Executive Director of Earthworks.
- Vanessa Hanley Lordi, Sports & Athletics category.
- Agnes Ubalde, VP and Community Development Officer, Wells Fargo Oakland.
- Alba Witkin, founder of Bernard E. and Alba Witkin Charitable Foundation.
- Liane Yasumoto, executive director of Culture! Disability! Talent!

== 2013 ==
- Ophelia Basgal, Region IX Regional Administrator of the U.S. Department of Housing and Urban Development.
- Carolyn Bloede, Alameda County Sustainability Program.
- Alice V. Deng, Youth category.
- Gilda Gonzales, President of the Port of Oakland's Board of Commissioners.
- Sherry Higgs, cancer survivor founded Drivers for Survivors.
- Ruth B. Love, superintendent of schools in Oakland and Chicago.
- Hope A. Michelsen, chemist at Sandia National Laboratories in Livermore.
- Sandra Pitts-Johnson, juvenile institutional officer at the Alameda County Juvenile Justice Center.
- Debra Pryor, Berkeley's first woman fire chief.
- Rita Sahai, director of the Hindustani Vocal Ensemble, University of California, Davis.

== 2012 ==
- Terry Alderete (1945–2013) founder of Alderete Business Visions.
- Pamela Arbuckle Alston, Dental Director at the Eastmont Wellness Center in Oakland.
- Barbara Bernstein, Community Service.
- Oral Lee Brown, Financial support of children's education.
- Deborah DeAngelis, Director of Athletics at Cal State East Bay.
- Arooj Haq, student, Youth category.
- Mildred Howard, Culture & Art category.
- Jocelyn D. Larkin, Executive Director of the legal foundation Impact Fund.
- Connie Galambos Malloy, environmentalist.
- Dawn Shaughnessy, radio chemist at Lawrence Livermore National Laboratory.
- Nicole Taylor (philanthropist), philanthropist.

== 2011 ==
- Lisa Busbee-Young, Program Director and Head Coach of the Starlings Oakland.
- Lois De Domenico, Philanthropist.
- Mary Jane Gross, RN, MN, Founder, President and CEO of Stars Behavioral Health Group.
- Jacqueline Hairston, pianist, composer and vocal coach.
- Wei-Ling Huber, former president of UNITE HERE labor union.
- Crystal Jaing, molecular biologist at Lawrence Livermore National Laboratory.
- Frances Jefferson, Labor union Field Director for SEIU Local 1021.
- Natassija Jordan-Oliver, intern for President Obama at the White House and for Representative Barbara Lee at her district office in Oakland.
- Julie Rems-Smario, DeafHope, the only Alameda County advocacy program for deaf victims of sexual assault and domestic violence.
- Olis Simmons, Executive Director of Youth Uprising.
- Elaine Taylor (environmentalist) Co-Founder and President of the Taylor Family Foundation.
- Carole Ward Allen, Educator, professor, and political consultant.

== 2010 ==
- Boona Cheema, Executive Director of Building Opportunities for Self Sufficiency (BOSS).
- LaDonna Harris (law enforcement), Alameda County Sheriff's Office.
- Regina Jackson, CEO of the East Oakland Youth Development Center.
- Kathy Kuhner, started Dogtown Development to revitalize the neighborhood.
- Taylor Marie Lyons, student activist with the Boys and Girls Club of Oakland and the McCullum Youth Court.
- Lisa A. Poyneer, engineer who helped develop the Gemini Planet Imager.
- Gayle Quinn, Director of Health Education at the West Oakland Health Center.
- Favianna Rodriguez, artist and activist.
- Suzanne Shenfil, Director of Human Services Department, Fremont.
- Sandra J. Threlfall, Executive Director of Waterfront Action Inc.
- Vanessa Woodmansee, sports and athletics.

== 2009 ==
- Cherri Allison, Executive Director of our Alameda County Family Justice Center.
- Gina Bonanno, technical manager at Lawrence Livermore National Laboratory.
- Diamond Broussard, Youth category, Black Student Union and Editor-in-Chief of the student newspaper.
- Linda Campana, Sports & Athletics.
- Margot Dashiell, Community Service.
- Judy Goff, workers' rights and economic justice.
- G. G. Greenhouse, executive director of the Alameda County Health Care for the Homeless and Homeless Families Programs.
- Mildred Oliver, Business & Professions category.
- Kemba Shakur, Environmentalist. Founded the non-profit Urban Releaf.
- Charlene Sigman, created School of Imagination and Happy Talkers for children with communication difficulties.
- Mona Vaughn Scott, Culture & Art.

== 2008 ==
- Helen Daniel, Instructor and mentor at Livermore High School.
- Peggy Fulton Hora (c.1946–2020) First woman judge in South Alameda County.
- Jane C. Garcia, CEO of La Clínica de la Raza in Oakland.
- Pam Hullinger, veterinarian.
- Barbara Millican Montgomery, community activist.
- Peggy Peabody (ballet)
- Carla Perez (environmentalist)

== 2007 ==
- Sade Daniels, advocate and mentor for foster youth.
- Sue Doro, Non-Traditional Careers.
- Margaret Gordon (environmentalist)
- Gloria Grant-Wilson, Founder/Executive Director of the Adewole Community Group, Inc.
- Hope Ishii, scientist who as a researcher at Lawrence Livermore National Laboratory, studied cosmic dust collected by NASA's Stardust mission.
- Eva Paterson, founder of the Equal Justice Society.
- Sonia B. Manjon, currently inaugural director of the Lawrence and Isabel Barnett Center for Integrated Arts and Enterprise, and Associate Professor of Arts Administration, Education and Policy at The Ohio State University.
- Sylvia Rosales-Fike, founder and CEO of AnewAmerica Community Corporation.
- Carolyn Russell (community service), Executive Director of A Safe Place for victims of domestic violence.
- Marye L. Thomas,

== 2006 ==
- Mary Cheng, Education
- Freddye M. Davis, president of Hayward South Alameda County NAACP.
- Halie Fitzwater-Williams, Youth
- Carol Kotewicz-Dencker, founder of Renoir Staffing, LLC
- Alta Bates (1879–1955), founder of Alta Bates Hospital.
- Deborah Vaughan, co-founder of Dimensions Dance Theater.
- Kristi Yamaguchi, USA Olympic figure skating gold medalist.

== 2005 ==
- Themy-Jo Adachi, Mills College athletic director.
- Saundra Brown Armstrong, senior district Jllludge.
- Priscilla Banks, an advocate for African-American women with breast cancer.
- Dona Crawford, associate director for Computation at Lawrence Livermore National Laboratory.
- Rory Darrah, education director for Every Child Counts in San Leandro.
- Elaine DeColigny, executive director of Building Futures with Women and Children in San Leandro.
- Joan Tarika Lewis, artist, musician, author, first women member of the Black Panther Party.
- Arabella Martinez, assistant secretary of the U.S. Department of Health, Education and Welfare.
- Casey Oto, high school student, was honored for her volunteer work building a library for the Lincoln Childcare Center in Oakland.

== 2004 ==
- June A. Cook, Golf and Business Director of LPGA-USGA Girls Golf Club, an advocate of the Upward Bound program.
- Rebecca Denison, founder of WORLD (Women Organized to Respond to Life-Threatening Diseases).
- Sandy Ferreira (environmentalist), Senior Park Ranger for the City of Fremont, District Manager for Alameda County, California Wood Duck Program, co-creator of Tree Swallow Nest Box Program at Fremont’s Central Park.
- Erin Nikole Gums, Youth category, numerous volunteer activities.
- Tammy Jernigan, Five mission as Space Shuttle astronaut.
- Susan Muscarella, president of California Jazz Conservatory.
- Nancy E. O'Malley, Chief Assistant District Attorney for the County of Alameda.
- Sonjia Parker Redmond, Vice President of Student Affairs at California State University, Hayward.
- Nancy Schluntz, Executive Director of the Family Emergency Shelter Coalition (FESCO).
- Darla Stevens, executive director of Community Television (CTV), Pleasanton.

== 2003 ==
- Norlen E. Drossel (1944–2003) Berkeley attorney and foster parent.
- Diana Herron, Community Service.
- Shirley Manly-Lampkin, Assistant Clinical Professor, UCSF.
- Claire Ellen Max, professor of astronomy and astrophysics at the University of California, Santa Cruz.
- Esther Brown Mabry, Co-owner (along with husband William Mabry) of Esther's Orbit Room blues and jazz club in the heart of West Oakland.
- Lisa W. Piatetsky, Culture & Art
- Ellen Raber, Community Service
- Wendy Schlesinger, Sports & Athletics
- Arthurlene G. Towner, Education

== 2002 ==
- Carol Maddox Arata, Justice
- Eva Clark (Alameda), Education
- Veronica Ventura Bitz, Youth
- Gigi Crowder, Executive Director of NAMI Contra Costa.
- Mary Jackson ( Community Service)
- Marylia Kelley, Co-Founder and Executive Director of Tri-Valley Communities Against a Radioactive Environment.
- Barbara Ramsey, Health
- Robin E. Toussaint, Sports & Athletics
- Cecilia Weed, also recipient of the 2006 Jefferson Award.

== 2001 ==
- Minnie Bateman (c.1921–2004), Storyteller.
- Ruthe P. Gomez, Business & Professions
- Dorothy Graham (health), Health
- Cynthia Harris (educator), Education
- Linda Levitsky, Environment
- Susan Opp, Science
- Helen Waukazoo (1941–2021), Co-founded, developed and built the Friendship House substance abuse prevention, treatment and recovery program for Native Americans.
- Ilene Weinreb (1931–2020) Hayward, California's first elected female mayor.

== 2000 ==
- Carole Brown, Business & Professions
- Minnie Gibson, Culture & Art
- Hillary Larkin, Health
- Fleurdeliz Orjalo, Sports & Athletics
- Majeedah Rahman, Contra Costa College professor, Healthy Babies Project Inc.
- Nancy Steele (education), Education
- Kristina Wolf, interior designer.
- Nancy Wu (California), Youth

== 1999 ==
- Sally Joan Baker, Culture and Art
- Brenda J. Crawford, Community Service
- Henriette M. Leclerc Lovett (1946–2005) teacher at Contra Costa and Diablo Community Colleges.
- Ethel Long-Scott, Executive Director of the Ethel Long-Scott Women's Economic Agenda Project, (WEAP).
- Connie L. Nelson, Environment
- Irene Obera, track and field athlete.
- Jennifer Lynn Walker, Youth
- Bonnie Wheatley, Health

== 1998 ==
- Pamm Drake, Dance instructor.
- Sylvia J. Johnson, first woman of color to serve as the county's chief probation officer.
- Tina Krietz, teacher at and director of a parenting program at Island High School.
- Lisa Ludden, high school drama student who raised more than $2,000 for an AIDS project.
- Tricia McMahon, Franciscan Sister and breast cancer consultant.
- Donna Olsen (c.1932–2020), founder of Tri-City Ecology Center.
- Michele Raymond Silsdorf, Special Olympics advocate and coach.
- Mother Wright (1921–2009), providing food and clothing to the needy.

== 1997 ==
- Jean Ficklin, education, community service.
- Carol Henie Culture and Art
- Loren Jones (Helen) health care
- Loyola Maynard Smith sports athletics
- Margaret Jory Tracy, (c.1923–2016) Co-founder Preserve Area Ridgelands Committee, resulting in the creation of Ohlone Wilderness and Pleasanton Ridge Regional Park.
- Pauline A. Weaver, Criminal Defense Pro Bono Practitioner.
- Niculia Williams, Executive director Berkeley Youth Alternatives.

== 1996 ==
- Marie Archer, Culture and Arts
- Julia Madison Blackwell (1946–2008) Justice
- Corinne Mohrmann, Executive director of Saint Vincent's Day Home.
- Sylvia M. Oberti, Sports/Athletics
- Jerry Raber, Environment
- Sandy Turner (health care), Health Care
- Colette Winlock, Track and field athlete and author, 1978 induction into the Pioneer Athletics Hall of Fame.

== 1995 ==
- Viola Blythe (Sept. 28, 1916 – July 5, 2002) community service.
- Helen Jane Duvall (1916–2010) bowler. Note: Double check to see if the bowler is the correct Helen Jane Duvall. The bowler was from Berkeley.
- Carolyn Getridge, Superintendent of the Oakland Unified School District.
- Sherry M. Hirota, CEO of Asian Health Services.
- Audrey A. LePell, founder of CATS (Citizens for Alternative Transportation Solutions)
- Elizabeth Lloyd Mayer (1947–2005) psychoanalyst, author, associate clinical professor and accomplished singer who founded the California Revels.
- Bernida Mary Reagan, attorney.

== 1994 ==
- Madi Bacon (1906–2001), founder of the San Francisco Boys Chorus (SFBC)
- Yolanda Baldovinos, health care
- Bonnie Davis (author), freelance writer.
- Nancy K. D. Lemon author and UC Berkeley School of Law faculty member specializing in domestic violence.
- Norma S. Rees (c.1930–2013) president California State University, East Bay.
- Sharon Richardson Jones, first black woman executive in baseball.
