= Clarice Phelps =

American nuclear chemist

- Phelps in 2020
- Born: Clarice Evone Salone
- Education: Tennessee State University (BS, 2003); US Navy Nuclear Power School; University of Texas at Austin (MS, 2020); University of Tennessee (PhD, 2026)
- Scientific career
- Fields: Transuranic elements; nuclear chemistry; nuclear engineering; nuclear power; nuclear reactors; thermodynamics
- Workplaces: Oak Ridge National Laboratory
- Military career
- Branch: United States Navy
- Unit: USS Ronald Reagan

Clarice Evone Phelps (née Salone) is an American nuclear chemist researching the processing of radioactive transuranic elements at the US Department of Energy's Oak Ridge National Laboratory (ORNL). She was part of ORNL's team that collaborated with the Joint Institute for Nuclear Research to discover tennessine (element 117). The International Union of Pure and Applied Chemistry (IUPAC) recognizes her as the first African American woman to be involved with the discovery of a chemical element.

Phelps was formerly in the US Navy Nuclear Power Program. Phelps works in ORNL's Department of Energy's Isotope & Fuel Cycle Technology Division, where her projects have included programs for purification of berkelium-249 and industrial uses of nickel-63 and selenium-75.

== Early life and education ==
Phelps was raised in Tennessee. Her interest in chemistry began during her childhood when she was given a microscope and encyclopedia-based science kit by her mother. Her interest was further nurtured by her secondary school science teachers. She is an alumna of the Tennessee Aquatic Project and Development Group, a nonprofit organization for at-risk youth.

Phelps completed a Bachelor of Science in chemistry from Tennessee State University in 2003, a Master of Science in mechanical engineering through the nuclear and radiochemistry program at the University of Texas at Austin in 2020, and a PhD in nuclear engineering from the University of Tennessee in 2026.

== Career ==
=== United States Navy ===
Phelps struggled academically in college. Unable to find employment after graduating, she joined the United States Navy. Phelps enrolled in the Navy's Nuclear Power School, which she credits with teaching her "how to study". Phelps studied nuclear power, reactor theory, and thermodynamics, and graduated in the top 10% of her class of 300–400 students. In 2019, Phelps told an interviewer that she pursued nuclear chemistry in part because of the lack of black women in the field, commenting: "They needed to see somebody like me sitting in the same spaces that they were at, and excelling in that same space."

Phelps served as a non-commissioned officer in the United States Navy Nuclear Power Program. She spent four and a half years aboard the aircraft carrier USS Ronald Reagan, operating the nuclear reactor and steam generator chemistry controls, and maintaining the water in the reactor. She was deployed twice, and was the only black woman in her division on the ship.

=== Oak Ridge National Laboratory ===
After serving in the US Navy, Phelps worked at chemical instrument company Cole-Parmer in Chicago, Illinois, but a year later, not liking the cold Chicago climate, she returned to Tennessee. In June 2009, Phelps joined Oak Ridge National Laboratory. She started as a technician and was later promoted to research associate and program manager. Phelps works in the Nuclear Science and Engineering Directorate as the project manager for the nickel-63 and selenium-75 industrial isotope programs. As a member of Oak Ridge's Nuclear Materials Processing Group, she is part of the research and development staff, working with "super heavy" transuranic isotopes that are produced mainly by nuclear transmutation. She is also a member of the Medical, Industrial and Research Isotopes Group, where she researches elements such as actinium, lanthanum, europium, and samarium.

Phelps was involved in the discovery of the second-heaviest known element, tennessine (element 117). She was part of a three-month process to purify 22 mg of berkelium-249, which was shipped to the Joint Institute for Nuclear Research and combined with calcium-48 in a fusion reaction to create tennessine. In IUPAC's crediting Oak Ridge laboratory collectively as principal co-discoverer of tennessine, it acknowledged 61 individuals at ORNL who had contributed to the project including members of operations staff, support personnel, and researchers such as Phelps. It recognized Phelps as the first African-American woman involved with the discovery of a chemical element.

When Oak Ridge National Laboratory held a gala to honor and celebrate the team that discovered tennessine, Phelps's name was left off the list, and when she showed up, she cried as she realized that she did not have a seat at the table with the other scientists. In addition, a plaque to commemorate the discovery was created to be hung up in perpetuity at the laboratory, and once again, it omitted her name. Phelps was told that her name had been cut off by mistake due to a line break in a spreadsheet. While the laboratory later said that the "error [was] quickly corrected", it was only after Phelps fought for several months to have her name included that the laboratory acquiesced.

Phelps has contributed to additional research efforts, including those of spectroscopic analysis and spectrophotometric valence state studies of plutonium-238 and neptunium-237 and 238 for the National Aeronautic and Space Administration (NASA). Phelps has also studied electrodeposition with californium-252 for the Californium Rare Isotope Breeder Upgrade project.

Phelps is a member of the American Chemical Society.

=== Science outreach; awards and recognition ===
Phelps is involved in several outreach projects to increase youth participation in the fields of science, technology, engineering, and mathematics (STEM). She serves on ORNL's Educational Outreach Committee as its diversity chair for Knox County Schools. She has done outreach through the ASCEND program of the Alpha Kappa Alpha sorority's graduate chapter, establishing a program to teach robotics, drones, circuitry, and coding to inner city high school students in Knoxville. Phelps is also the Vice President of the board of Youth Outreach in Science, Technology, Engineering and Mathematics (YO-STEM).

Phelps was featured on the Oak Ridge Associated Universities STEM stories program, partnering with nearby schools in Tennessee. Phelps received the 2017 YWCA Knoxville Tribute to Women Award in the category Technology, Research, and Innovation. This award recognizes "local women who lead their fields in technology and excel in community service".

In 2019, the International Union of Pure and Applied Chemistry (IUPAC) featured Phelps in the Periodic Table of Younger Chemists in recognition of "her outstanding commitment to research and public engagement, as well as being an important advocate for diversity". She was one of two Oak Ridge National Laboratory researchers thus honored. Phelps is associated on this honorary periodic table with the element einsteinium, having along with others, including Julie Ezold, researched purification of einsteinium-254, and her fellow awardee, the post-doctoral researcher Nathan Brewer of Oak Ridge laboratory's Physics Division, is associated with the element tennessine. Their inclusion follows a competition by the IUPAC and the International Younger Chemists Network (IYCN).

At the December 6, 2019 TEDxNashvilleWomen, Phelps presented the talk "How I Claimed a Seat at the Periodic Table", where, according to TED Talks, she "debunk[ed] the myth of solitary genius and challenge[d] institutional elitism by sharing stories of women of color making their way in science".

In 2026, Phelps said that mentoring future scientists and expanding access to STEM education remain important parts of her work. She also serves as an adjunct instructor at Pellissippi State Community College.

=== Wikipedia article ===
In September 2018, British physicist Jessica Wade created an article on the English Wikipedia about Phelps, but this was deleted on February 11, 2019. On April 12, The Washington Post published an op-ed about, in part, the English-language Wikipedia's lack of coverage given to Phelps' contribution to the discovery of element 117. The column, co-written by Wade, decried discussions among volunteer editors at the site that resulted in deletion of the article on Phelps. According to an article in the July 2019 Chemistry World, "her name didn't appear in the articles announcing tennessine's discovery. She wasn't profiled by mainstream media. Most mentions of her work are on her employer's website – a source that's not classed as independent by Wikipedia standards and therefore not admissible when it comes to establishing notability. The [Wikipedia] community consensus was that her biography had to go." The deletion was contested multiple times. The article was restored in January 2020.
