= Joseph H. Hamilton =

American nuclear physicist and academic (born 1932)

Joseph H. Hamilton (born 1932) is an American nuclear physicist and academic who was a professor at Vanderbilt University.

== Life and career ==
Joseph H. Hamilton was born in Ferriday, Louisiana in 1932. He received his bachelor's degree from Mississippi College, his master's and doctoral degrees from Indiana University, and honorary doctorates from Mississippi College and the Goethe Universitât Frankfurt.

His research has established that the nuclei of atoms may have multiple possible co-existing states. He was one of the discoverers of element 117, tennessine, which was named after the state of Tennessee because of his contribution.

He founded the University Isotope Separator at Oak Ridge (UNISOR), a consortium of twelve universities, in 1971. In 1981, he founded the Joint Institute for Heavy Ion Research (JIHIR) in Oak Ridge.
