= Tennessine =

Tennessine, _{117}Ts
Tennessine
- Pronunciation: /ˈtɛnəsiːn/ (TEN-ə-seen)
- Appearance: semimetallic (predicted)
- Mass number: [294]

Tennessine in the periodic table
Hydrogen																															Helium
Lithium	Beryllium																									Boron	Carbon	Nitrogen	Oxygen	Fluorine	Neon
Sodium	Magnesium																									Aluminium	Silicon	Phosphorus	Sulfur	Chlorine	Argon
Potassium	Calcium															Scandium	Titanium	Vanadium	Chromium	Manganese	Iron	Cobalt	Nickel	Copper	Zinc	Gallium	Germanium	Arsenic	Selenium	Bromine	Krypton
Rubidium	Strontium															Yttrium	Zirconium	Niobium	Molybdenum	Technetium	Ruthenium	Rhodium	Palladium	Silver	Cadmium	Indium	Tin	Antimony	Tellurium	Iodine	Xenon
Caesium	Barium	Lanthanum	Cerium	Praseodymium	Neodymium	Promethium	Samarium	Europium	Gadolinium	Terbium	Dysprosium	Holmium	Erbium	Thulium	Ytterbium	Lutetium	Hafnium	Tantalum	Tungsten	Rhenium	Osmium	Iridium	Platinum	Gold	Mercury (element)	Thallium	Lead	Bismuth	Polonium	Astatine	Radon
Francium	Radium	Actinium	Thorium	Protactinium	Uranium	Neptunium	Plutonium	Americium	Curium	Berkelium	Californium	Einsteinium	Fermium	Mendelevium	Nobelium	Lawrencium	Rutherfordium	Dubnium	Seaborgium	Bohrium	Hassium	Meitnerium	Darmstadtium	Roentgenium	Copernicium	Nihonium	Flerovium	Moscovium	Livermorium	Tennessine	Oganesson
At
↑
Ts
↓
—
livermorium ← tennessine → oganesson
- Atomic number (Z): 117
- Group: group 17 (halogens)
- Period: period 7
- Block: p-block
- Electron configuration: [Rn] 5f^{14} 6d^{10} 7s^{2} 7p^{5} (predicted)
- Electrons per shell: 2, 8, 18, 32, 32, 18, 7 (predicted)

Physical properties
- Phase at STP: solid (predicted)
- Melting point: 623–823 K (350–550 °C, 662–1022 °F) (predicted)
- Boiling point: 883 K (610 °C, 1130 °F) (predicted)
- Density (near r.t.): 7.1–7.3 g/cm^{3} (extrapolated)

Atomic properties
- Oxidation states: common: (none) (−1), (+1), (+3) (+5)
- Ionization energies: 1st: 742.9 kJ/mol (predicted); 2nd: 1435.4 kJ/mol (predicted); 3rd: 2161.9 kJ/mol (predicted); (more)
- Atomic radius: empirical: 138 pm (predicted)
- Covalent radius: 156–157 pm (extrapolated)

Other properties
- Natural occurrence: synthetic
- CAS Number: 54101-14-3

History
- Naming: after Tennessee region
- Discovery: Joint Institute for Nuclear Research, Lawrence Livermore National Laboratory, Vanderbilt University and Oak Ridge National Laboratory (2010)

Isotopes of tennessine
Main isotopes			Decay	
Isotope	abundance	half-life (t_{1/2})	mode	product
^{293}Ts	synth	22 ms	α	^{289}Mc
^{294}Ts	synth	51 ms	α	^{290}Mc

Tennessine is a synthetic element; it has symbol Ts and atomic number 117. It has the second-highest atomic number and the joint-highest atomic mass of all known elements, and is the penultimate element of the 7th period of the periodic table. It is named after the U.S. state or region of Tennessee where key research institutions involved in its discovery are located.

The discovery of tennessine was officially announced in Dubna, Russia, by a Russian–American collaboration in April 2010, which makes it the most recently discovered element. One of its daughter isotopes was created directly in 2011, partially confirming the experiment's results. The experiment was successfully repeated by the same collaboration in 2012 and by a joint German–American team in May 2014. In December 2015, the Joint Working Party of the International Union of Pure and Applied Chemistry (IUPAC) and the International Union of Pure and Applied Physics (IUPAP), which evaluates claims of discovery of new elements, recognized the element and assigned the priority to the Russian–American team. In June 2016, the IUPAC published a declaration stating that the discoverers had suggested the name tennessine, a name which was officially adopted in November 2016. (Note: The declaration by the IUPAC mentioned "the contribution of the Tennessee region (emphasis added), including Oak Ridge National Laboratory, Vanderbilt University, and the University of Tennessee at Knoxville, Tennessee, to superheavy element research, including the production and chemical separation of unique actinide target materials for superheavy element synthesis at ORNL's High Flux Isotope Reactor (HFIR) and Radiochemical Engineering Development Center (REDC)".)

Tennessine may be located in the "island of stability", a concept that explains why some superheavy elements are more stable despite an overall trend of decreasing stability for elements beyond bismuth on the periodic table. The synthesized tennessine atoms have lasted tens and hundreds of milliseconds. In the periodic table, tennessine is expected to be a member of group 17, the halogens. (Note: The term "group 17" refers to a column in the periodic table starting with fluorine. The term "halogen" is sometimes considered as synonymous, but sometimes it instead relates to a common set of chemical and physical properties shared by fluorine, chlorine, bromine, iodine, and astatine, all of which precede tennessine in group 17. Unlike the other group 17 members, tennessine might not be a halogen under this stricter definition.) Some of its properties may differ significantly from those of the lighter halogens due to relativistic effects. As a result, tennessine is expected to be a volatile metal that neither forms anions nor achieves high oxidation states. A few key properties, such as its melting and boiling points and its first ionization energy, are nevertheless expected to follow the periodic trends of the halogens.

== Introduction ==
=== Synthesis of superheavy nuclei ===
A graphic depiction of a nuclear fusion reaction. Two nuclei fuse into one, emitting a neutron. Reactions that created new elements to this moment were similar, though varying numbers of neutrons – or alternatively charged particles – may be emitted instead.

A superheavy (Note: In nuclear physics, an element is called heavy if its atomic number is high; lead (element 82) is one example of such a heavy element. The term "superheavy elements" typically refers to elements with atomic number greater than 103 (although there are other definitions, such as atomic number greater than 100 or 112; sometimes, the term is presented an equivalent to the term "transactinide", which puts an upper limit before the beginning of the hypothetical superactinide series). Terms "heavy isotopes" (of a given element) and "heavy nuclei" mean what could be understood in the common language—isotopes of high mass (for the given element) and nuclei of high mass, respectively.) atomic nucleus is created in a nuclear reaction that combines two other nuclei of unequal size (Note: In 2009, a team at the JINR led by Oganessian published results of their attempt to create hassium in a symmetric ^{136}Xe + ^{136}Xe reaction. They failed to observe a single atom in such a reaction, putting the upper limit on the cross section, the measure of probability of a nuclear reaction, as 2.5 pb. In comparison, the reaction that resulted in hassium discovery, ^{208}Pb + ^{58}Fe, had a cross section of ~20 pb (more specifically, 19^{+19}_{-11} pb), as estimated by the discoverers.) into one; roughly, the more unequal the two nuclei in terms of mass, the greater the possibility that the two react. The material made of the heavier nuclei is made into a target, which is then bombarded by the beam of lighter nuclei. Two nuclei can only fuse into one if they are close enough to each other; normally, nuclei (all positively charged) repel each other due to electrostatic repulsion. The strong interaction can overcome this repulsion but only within a very short distance from a nucleus; beam nuclei are thus greatly accelerated in order to make such repulsion insignificant compared to the velocity of the beam nucleus. The energy applied to the beam nuclei to accelerate them can cause them to reach speeds as high as one-tenth of the speed of light. However, if too much energy is applied, the beam nucleus can fall apart.

Coming close enough alone is not enough for two nuclei to fuse: when two nuclei approach each other, they usually remain together for about 10^{−20} seconds and then part ways (not necessarily in the same composition as before the reaction) rather than form a single nucleus. This happens because during the attempted formation of a single nucleus, electrostatic repulsion tears apart the nucleus that is being formed. Each pair of a target and a beam is characterized by its cross section—the probability that fusion will occur if two nuclei approach one another expressed in terms of the transverse area that the incident particle must hit in order for the fusion to occur. (Note: The amount of energy applied to the beam particle to accelerate it can also influence the value of cross section. For example, in the ^{28}_{14}Si + ^{1}_{0}n → ^{28}_{13}Al + ^{1}_{1}p reaction, cross section changes smoothly from 370 mb at 12.3 MeV to 160 mb at 18.3 MeV, with a broad peak at 13.5 MeV with the maximum value of 380 mb.) This fusion may occur as a result of the quantum effect in which nuclei can tunnel through electrostatic repulsion. If the two nuclei can stay close past that phase, multiple nuclear interactions result in redistribution of energy and an energy equilibrium.

External videos
- Visualization of unsuccessful nuclear fusion, based on calculations from the Australian National University

The resulting merger is an excited state—termed a compound nucleus—and thus it is very unstable. To reach a more stable state, the temporary merger may fission without formation of a more stable nucleus. Alternatively, the compound nucleus may eject a few neutrons, which would carry away the excitation energy; if the latter is not sufficient for a neutron expulsion, the merger would produce a gamma ray. This happens in about 10^{−16} seconds after the initial nuclear collision and results in creation of a more stable nucleus. The definition by the IUPAC/IUPAP Joint Working Party (JWP) states that a chemical element can only be recognized as discovered if a nucleus of it exists for at least 10^{−14} seconds. This value was chosen as an estimate of how long it takes a nucleus to acquire electrons and thus display its chemical properties. (Note: This figure also marks the generally accepted upper limit for lifetime of a compound nucleus.)

=== Decay and detection ===
The beam passes through the target and reaches the next chamber, the separator; if a new nucleus is produced, it is carried with this beam. In the separator, the newly produced nucleus is separated from other nuclides (that of the original beam and any other reaction products) (Note: This separation is based on that the resulting nuclei move past the target more slowly then the unreacted beam nuclei. The separator contains electric and magnetic fields whose effects on a moving particle cancel out for a specific velocity of a particle. Such separation can also be aided by a time-of-flight measurement and a recoil energy measurement; a combination of the two may allow to estimate the mass of a nucleus.) and transferred to a surface-barrier detector, which stops the nucleus. The exact location of the upcoming impact on the detector is marked; also marked are its energy and the time of the arrival. The transfer takes about 10^{−6} seconds; in order to be detected, the nucleus must survive this long. The nucleus is recorded again once its decay is registered, and the location, the energy, and the time of the decay are measured.

Stability of a nucleus is provided by the strong interaction. However, its range is very short; as nuclei become larger, its influence on the outermost nucleons (protons and neutrons) weakens. At the same time, the nucleus is torn apart by electrostatic repulsion between protons, and its range is not limited. Total binding energy provided by the strong interaction increases linearly with the number of nucleons, whereas electrostatic repulsion increases with the square of the atomic number, i.e. the latter grows faster and becomes increasingly important for heavy and superheavy nuclei. Superheavy nuclei are thus theoretically predicted and have so far been observed to predominantly decay via decay modes that are caused by such repulsion: alpha decay and spontaneous fission. (Note: Not all decay modes are caused by electrostatic repulsion. For example, beta decay is caused by the weak interaction.) Almost all alpha emitters have over 210 nucleons, and the lightest nuclide primarily undergoing spontaneous fission has 238. In both decay modes, nuclei are inhibited from decaying by corresponding energy barriers for each mode, but they can be tunneled through.

Scheme of an apparatus for creation of superheavy elements, based on the Dubna Gas-Filled Recoil Separator set up in the Flerov Laboratory of Nuclear Reactions in JINR. The trajectory within the detector and the beam focusing apparatus changes because of a dipole magnet in the former and quadrupole magnets in the latter.

Alpha particles are commonly produced in radioactive decays because the mass of an alpha particle per nucleon is small enough to leave some energy for the alpha particle to be used as kinetic energy to leave the nucleus. Spontaneous fission is caused by electrostatic repulsion tearing the nucleus apart and produces various nuclei in different instances of identical nuclei fissioning. As the atomic number increases, spontaneous fission rapidly becomes more important: spontaneous fission partial half-lives decrease by 23 orders of magnitude from uranium (element 92) to nobelium (element 102), and by 30 orders of magnitude from thorium (element 90) to fermium (element 100). The earlier liquid drop model thus suggested that spontaneous fission would occur nearly instantly due to disappearance of the fission barrier for nuclei with about 280 nucleons. The later nuclear shell model suggested that nuclei with about 300 nucleons would form an island of stability in which nuclei will be more resistant to spontaneous fission and will primarily undergo alpha decay with longer half-lives. Subsequent discoveries suggested that the predicted island might be further than originally anticipated; they also showed that nuclei intermediate between the long-lived actinides and the predicted island are deformed, and gain additional stability from shell effects. Experiments on lighter superheavy nuclei, as well as those closer to the expected island, have shown greater than previously anticipated stability against spontaneous fission, showing the importance of shell effects on nuclei. (Note: It was already known by the 1960s that ground states of nuclei differed in energy and shape as well as that certain magic numbers of nucleons corresponded to greater stability of a nucleus. However, it was assumed that there was no nuclear structure in superheavy nuclei as they were too deformed to form one.)

Alpha decays are registered by the emitted alpha particles, and the decay products are easy to determine before the actual decay; if such a decay or a series of consecutive decays produces a known nucleus, the original product of a reaction can be easily determined. (Note: Since mass of a nucleus is not measured directly but is rather calculated from that of another nucleus, such measurement is called indirect. Direct measurements are also possible, but for the most part they have remained unavailable for superheavy nuclei. The first direct measurement of mass of a superheavy nucleus was reported in 2018 at LBNL. Mass was determined from the location of a nucleus after the transfer (the location helps determine its trajectory, which is linked to the mass-to-charge ratio of the nucleus, since the transfer was done in presence of a magnet).) (That all decays within a decay chain were indeed related to each other is established by the location of these decays, which must be in the same place.) The known nucleus can be recognized by the specific characteristics of decay it undergoes such as decay energy (or more specifically, the kinetic energy of the emitted particle). (Note: If the decay occurred in a vacuum, then since total momentum of an isolated system before and after the decay must be preserved, the daughter nucleus would also receive a small velocity. The ratio of the two velocities, and accordingly the ratio of the kinetic energies, would thus be inverse to the ratio of the two masses. The decay energy equals the sum of the known kinetic energy of the alpha particle and that of the daughter nucleus (an exact fraction of the former). The calculations hold for an experiment as well, but the difference is that the nucleus does not move after the decay because it is tied to the detector.) Spontaneous fission, however, produces various nuclei as products, so the original nuclide cannot be determined from its daughters. (Note: Spontaneous fission was discovered by Soviet physicist Georgy Flerov, a leading scientist at JINR, and thus it was a "hobbyhorse" for the facility. In contrast, the LBL scientists believed fission information was not sufficient for a claim of synthesis of an element. They believed spontaneous fission had not been studied enough to use it for identification of a new element, since there was a difficulty of establishing that a compound nucleus had only ejected neutrons and not charged particles like protons or alpha particles. They thus preferred to link new isotopes to the already known ones by successive alpha decays.)

The information available to physicists aiming to synthesize a superheavy element is thus the information collected at the detectors: location, energy, and time of arrival of a particle to the detector, and those of its decay. The physicists analyze this data and seek to conclude that it was indeed caused by a new element and could not have been caused by a different nuclide than the one claimed. Often, provided data is insufficient for a conclusion that a new element was definitely created and there is no other explanation for the observed effects; errors in interpreting data have been made. (Note: For instance, element 102 was mistakenly identified in 1957 at the Nobel Institute of Physics in Stockholm, Stockholm County, Sweden. There were no earlier definitive claims of creation of this element, and the element was assigned a name by its Swedish, American, and British discoverers, nobelium. It was later shown that the identification was incorrect. The following year, RL was unable to reproduce the Swedish results and announced instead their synthesis of the element; that claim was also disproved later. JINR insisted that they were the first to create the element and suggested a name of their own for the new element, joliotium; the Soviet name was also not accepted (JINR later referred to the naming of the element 102 as "hasty"). This name was proposed to IUPAC in a written response to their ruling on priority of discovery claims of elements, signed 29 September 1992. The name "nobelium" remained unchanged on account of its widespread usage.)

== History ==
=== Pre-discovery ===
In December 2004, the Joint Institute for Nuclear Research (JINR) team in Dubna, Moscow Oblast, Russia, proposed a joint experiment with the Oak Ridge National Laboratory (ORNL) in Oak Ridge, Tennessee, United States, to synthesize element 117 — so called for the 117 protons in its nucleus. Their proposal involved fusing a berkelium (element 97) target and a calcium (element 20) beam, conducted via bombardment of the berkelium target with calcium nuclei: this would complete a set of experiments done at the JINR on the fusion of actinide targets with a calcium-48 beam, which had thus far produced the new elements 113–116 and 118. ORNL—then the world's only producer of berkelium—could not then provide the element, as they had temporarily ceased production, and re-initiating it would be too costly. Plans to synthesize element 117 were suspended in favor of the confirmation of element 118, which had been produced earlier in 2002 by bombarding a californium target with calcium. The required berkelium-249 is a by-product in californium-252 production, and obtaining the required amount of berkelium was an even more difficult task than obtaining that of californium, as well as costly: It would cost around 3.5 million dollars, and the parties agreed to wait for a commercial order of californium production, from which berkelium could be extracted.

The JINR team sought to use berkelium because calcium-48, the isotope of calcium used in the beam, has 20 protons and 28 neutrons, making a neutron–proton ratio of 1.4; and it is the lightest stable or near-stable nucleus with such a large neutron excess. Thanks to the neutron excess, the resulting nuclei were expected to be heavier and closer to the sought-after island of stability. (Note: Although stable isotopes of the lightest elements usually have a neutron–proton ratio close or equal to one (for example, the only stable isotope of aluminium has 13 protons and 14 neutrons, making a neutron–proton ratio of 1.077), stable isotopes of heavier elements have higher neutron–proton ratios, increasing with the number of protons. For example, iodine's only stable isotope has 53 protons and 74 neutrons, giving neutron–proton ratio of 1.396, gold's only stable isotope has 79 protons and 118 neutrons, yielding a neutron–proton ratio of 1.494, and plutonium's most stable isotope has 94 protons and 150 neutrons, and a neutron–proton ratio of 1.596. This trend is expected to make it difficult to synthesize the most stable isotopes of super-heavy elements as the neutron–proton ratios of the elements they are synthesized from will be too low.) Of the aimed for 117 protons, calcium has 20, and thus they needed to use berkelium, which has 97 protons in its nucleus.

In February 2005, the leader of the JINR team — Yuri Oganessian — presented a colloquium at ORNL. Also in attendance were representatives of Lawrence Livermore National Laboratory, who had previously worked with JINR on the discovery of elements 113–116 and 118, and Joseph Hamilton of Vanderbilt University, a collaborator of Oganessian.

Hamilton checked if the ORNL high-flux reactor produced californium for a commercial order: The required berkelium could be obtained as a by-product. He learned that it did not and there was no expectation for such an order in the immediate future. Hamilton kept monitoring the situation, making the checks once in a while. (Later, Oganessian referred to Hamilton as "the father of 117" for doing this work.)

=== Discovery ===
ORNL resumed californium production in spring 2008. Hamilton noted the restart during the summer and made a deal on subsequent extraction of berkelium (the price was about $600,000). During a September 2008 symposium at Vanderbilt University in Nashville, Tennessee, celebrating his 50th year on the Physics faculty, Hamilton introduced Oganessian to James Roberto (then the deputy director for science and technology at ORNL). They established a collaboration among JINR, ORNL, and Vanderbilt. Clarice Phelps was part of ORNL's team that collaborated with JINR; the IUPAC recognizes her as the first African-American woman to be involved with the discovery of a chemical element. The eventual collaborating institutions also included The University of Tennessee (Knoxville), Lawrence Livermore National Laboratory, The Research Institute for Advanced Reactors (Russia), and The University of Nevada (Las Vegas).

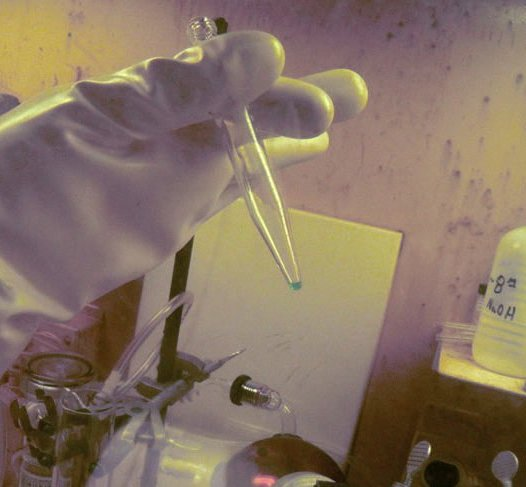
The berkelium target used for the synthesis (in solution)

In November 2008, the U.S. Department of Energy, which had oversight over the reactor in Oak Ridge, allowed the scientific use of the extracted berkelium.

The production lasted 250 days and ended in late December 2008, resulting in 22 milligrams of berkelium, enough to perform the experiment. In January 2009, the berkelium was removed from ORNL's High Flux Isotope Reactor; it was subsequently cooled for 90 days and then processed at ORNL's Radiochemical Engineering and Development Center to separate and purify the berkelium material, which took another 90 days. Its half-life is only 330 days: this means, after that time, half the berkelium produced would have decayed. Because of this, the berkelium target had to be quickly transported to Russia; for the experiment to be viable, it had to be completed within six months of its departure from the United States. The target was packed into five lead containers to be flown from New York to Moscow. Russian customs officials twice refused to let the target enter the country because of missing or incomplete paperwork. Over the span of a few days, the target traveled over the Atlantic Ocean five times. On its arrival in Russia in June 2009, the berkelium was immediately transferred to Research Institute of Atomic Reactors (RIAR) in Dimitrovgrad, Ulyanovsk Oblast, where it was deposited as a 300-nanometer-thin layer on a titanium film. In July 2009, it was transported to Dubna, where it was installed in the particle accelerator at the JINR. The calcium-48 beam was generated by chemically extracting the small quantities of calcium-48 present in naturally occurring calcium, enriching it 500 times. This work was done in the closed town of Lesnoy, Sverdlovsk Oblast, Russia.

The experiment began in late July 2009. In January 2010, scientists at the Flerov Laboratory of Nuclear Reactions announced internally that they had detected the decay of a new element with atomic number 117 via two decay chains: one of an odd–odd isotope undergoing 6 alpha decays before spontaneous fission, and one of an odd–even isotope undergoing 3 alpha decays before fission. The obtained data from the experiment was sent to the LLNL for further analysis. On 9 April 2010, an official report was released in the journal Physical Review Letters identifying the isotopes as ^{294}117 and ^{293}117, which were shown to have half-lives on the order of tens or hundreds of milliseconds. The work was signed by all parties involved in the experiment to some extent: JINR, ORNL, LLNL, RIAR, Vanderbilt, the University of Tennessee (Knoxville, Tennessee, U.S.), and the University of Nevada (Las Vegas, Nevada, U.S.), which provided data analysis support. The isotopes were formed as follows: (Note: A nuclide is commonly denoted by the chemical element's symbol immediately preceded by the mass number as a superscript and the atomic number as a subscript. Neutrons are represented as nuclides with atomic mass 1, atomic number 0, and symbol n. Outside the context of nuclear equations, the atomic number is sometimes omitted. An asterisk denotes an extremely short-lived (or even non-existent) intermediate stage of the reaction.)

^{249}_{97}Bk + ^{48}_{20}Ca → ^{297}117* → ^{294}117 + 3 ^{1}_{0}n (1 event)

^{249}_{97}Bk + ^{48}_{20}Ca → ^{297}117* → ^{293}117 + 4 ^{1}_{0}n (5 events)

=== Confirmation ===
Decay chain of the atoms produced in the original experiment. The figures near the arrows describe experimental (black) and theoretical (blue) values for the lifetime and energy of each decay. Lifetimes may be converted to half-lives by multiplying by ln 2.

All daughter isotopes (decay products) of element 117 were previously unknown; therefore, their properties could not be used to confirm the claim of discovery. In 2011, when one of the decay products (^{289}115) was synthesized directly, its properties matched those measured in the claimed indirect synthesis from the decay of element 117. The discoverers did not submit a claim for their findings in 2007–2011 when the Joint Working Party was reviewing claims of discoveries of new elements.

The Dubna team repeated the experiment in 2012, creating seven atoms of element 117 and confirming their earlier synthesis of element 118 (produced after some time when a significant quantity of the berkelium-249 target had beta decayed to californium-249). The results of the experiment matched the previous outcome. In May 2014, a joint German–American collaboration of scientists from the ORNL and the GSI Helmholtz Center for Heavy Ion Research in Darmstadt, Hessen, Germany, claimed to have confirmed discovery of the element. The team repeated the Dubna experiment using the Darmstadt accelerator, creating two atoms of element 117.

In December 2015, the JWP officially recognized the discovery of ^{293}117 on account of the confirmation of the properties of its daughter ^{289}115, and thus the listed discoverers — JINR, LLNL, and ORNL — were given the right to suggest an official name for the element. (Vanderbilt was left off the initial list of discoverers in an error that was later corrected.)

In May 2016, Lund University (Lund, Scania, Sweden) and GSI cast some doubt on the syntheses of elements 115 and 117. The decay chains assigned to ^{289}115, the isotope instrumental in the confirmation of the syntheses of elements 115 and 117, were found based on a new statistical method to be too different to belong to the same nuclide with a reasonably high probability. The reported ^{293}117 decay chains approved as such by the JWP were found to require splitting into individual data sets assigned to different isotopes of element 117. It was also found that the claimed link between the decay chains reported as from ^{293}117 and ^{289}115 probably did not exist. (On the other hand, the chains from the non-approved isotope ^{294}117 were found to be congruent.) The multiplicity of states found when nuclides that are not even–even undergo alpha decay is not unexpected and contributes to the lack of clarity in the cross-reactions. This study criticized the JWP report for overlooking subtleties associated with this issue, and considered it "problematic" that the only argument for the acceptance of the discoveries of elements 115 and 117 was a link they considered to be doubtful.

On 8 June 2017, two members of the Dubna team published a journal article answering these criticisms, analysing their data on the nuclides ^{293}117 and ^{289}115 with widely accepted statistical methods, noted that the 2016 studies indicating non-congruence produced problematic results when applied to radioactive decay: they excluded from the 90% confidence interval both average and extreme decay times, and the decay chains that would be excluded from the 90% confidence interval they chose were more probable to be observed than those that would be included. The 2017 reanalysis concluded that the observed decay chains of ^{293}117 and ^{289}115 were consistent with the assumption that only one nuclide was present at each step of the chain, although it would be desirable to be able to directly measure the mass number of the originating nucleus of each chain as well as the excitation function of the ^{243}Am + ^{48}Ca reaction.

=== Naming ===
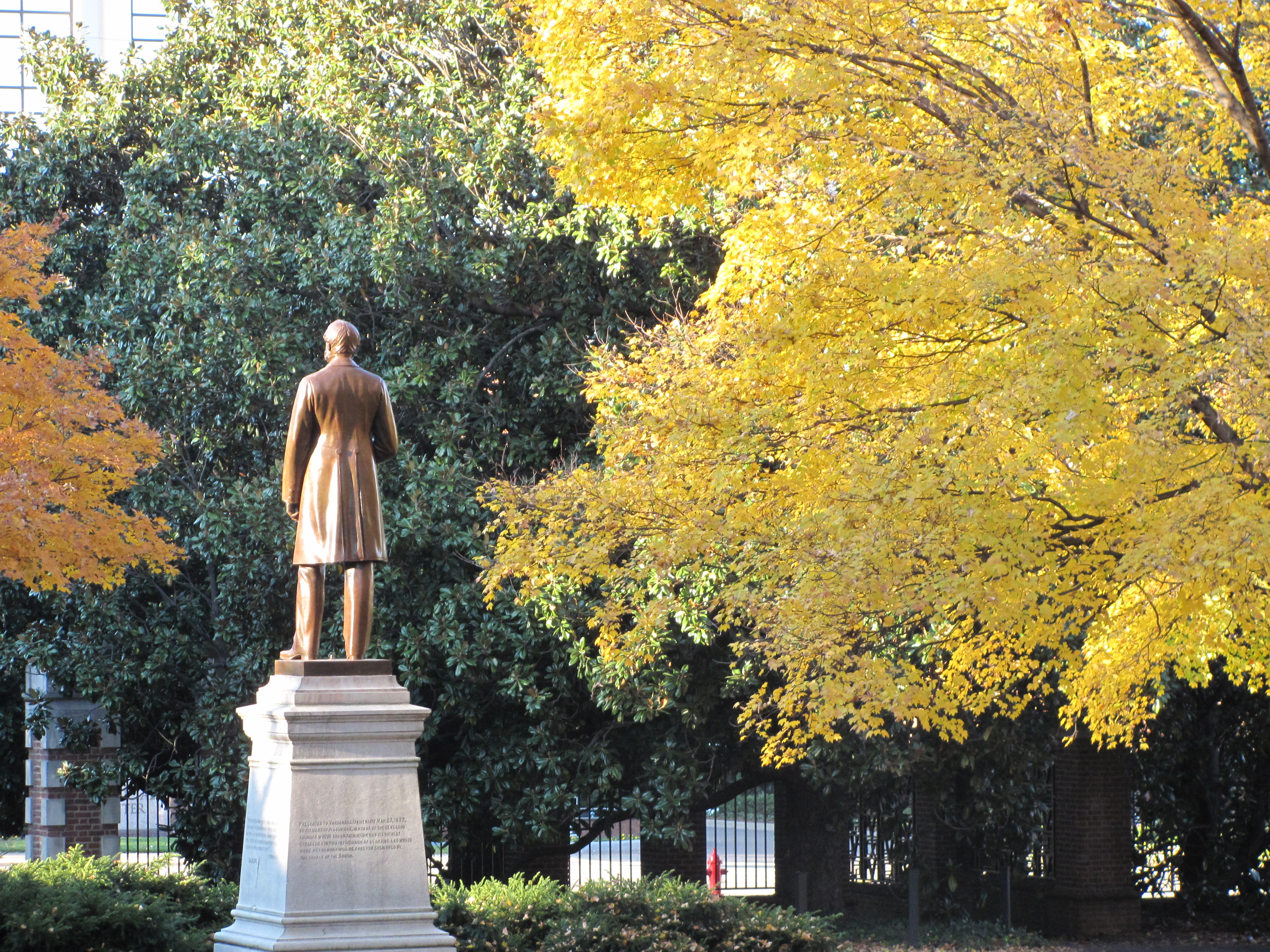
Main campus of Hamilton's workplace, Vanderbilt University, one of the institutions named as co-discoverers of tennessine

Using Mendeleev's nomenclature for unnamed and undiscovered elements, element 117 should be known as eka-astatine. Using the 1979 recommendations by the International Union of Pure and Applied Chemistry (IUPAC), the element was temporarily called ununseptium (symbol Uus), formed from Latin roots "one", "one", and "seven", a reference to the element's atomic number 117. Many scientists in the field called it "element 117", with the symbol E117, (117), or 117. According to guidelines of IUPAC valid at the moment of the discovery approval, the permanent names of new elements should have ended in "-ium"; this included element 117, even if the element was a halogen, which traditionally have names ending in "-ine"; however, the new recommendations published in 2016 recommended using the "-ine" ending for all new group 17 elements.

After the original synthesis in 2010, Dawn Shaughnessy of LLNL and Oganessian declared that naming was a sensitive question, and it was avoided as far as possible. However, Hamilton, who teaches at Vanderbilt University in Nashville, Tennessee, declared that year, "I was crucial in getting the group together and in getting the ^{249}Bk target essential for the discovery. As a result of that, I'm going to get to name the element. I can't tell you the name, but it will bring distinction to the region." In a 2015 interview, Oganessian, after telling the story of the experiment, said, "and the Americans named this a tour de force, they had demonstrated they could do [this] with no margin for error. Well, soon they will name the 117th element."

In March 2016, the discovery team agreed on a conference call involving representatives from the parties involved on the name "tennessine" for element 117. In June 2016, IUPAC published a declaration stating the discoverers had submitted their suggestions for naming the new elements 115, 117, and 118 to the IUPAC; the suggestion for the element 117 was tennessine, with a symbol of Ts, after "the region of Tennessee". The suggested names were recommended for acceptance by the IUPAC Inorganic Chemistry Division; formal acceptance was set to occur after a five-month term following publishing of the declaration expires. In November 2016, the names, including tennessine, were formally accepted. Concerns that the proposed symbol Ts may clash with a notation for the tosyl group used in organic chemistry were rejected, following existing symbols bearing such dual meanings: Ac (actinium and acetyl) and Pr (praseodymium and propyl). The naming ceremony for moscovium, tennessine, and oganesson was held on 2 March 2017 at the Russian Academy of Sciences in Moscow; a separate ceremony for tennessine alone had been held at ORNL in January 2017.

== Predicted properties ==
Other than nuclear properties, no properties of tennessine or its compounds have been measured; this is due to its extremely limited and expensive production and the fact that it decays very quickly. Properties of tennessine remain unknown and only predictions are available.

=== Nuclear stability and isotopes ===
The stability of nuclei quickly decreases with the increase in atomic number after curium, element 96, whose half-life is four orders of magnitude longer than that of any subsequent element. All isotopes with an atomic number above 101 undergo radioactive decay with half-lives of less than 30 hours. No elements with atomic numbers above 82 (after lead) have stable isotopes. This is because of the ever-increasing Coulomb repulsion of protons, so that the strong nuclear force cannot hold the nucleus together against spontaneous fission for long. Calculations suggest that in the absence of other stabilizing factors, elements with more than 104 protons should not exist. However, researchers in the 1960s suggested that the closed nuclear shells around 114 protons and 184 neutrons should counteract this instability, creating an "island of stability" where nuclides could have half-lives reaching thousands or millions of years. While scientists have still not reached the island, the mere existence of the superheavy elements (including tennessine) confirms that this stabilizing effect is real, and in general the known superheavy nuclides become exponentially longer-lived as they approach the predicted location of the island. Tennessine is the second-heaviest element created so far, and all its known isotopes have half-lives of less than one second. Nevertheless, this is longer than the values predicted prior to their discovery: the predicted lifetimes for ^{293}Ts and ^{294}Ts used in the discovery paper were 10 ms and 45 ms respectively, while the observed lifetimes were 21 ms and 112 ms respectively. The Dubna team believes that the synthesis of the element is direct experimental proof of the existence of the island of stability.

A chart of nuclide stability as used by the Dubna team in 2010. Characterized isotopes are shown with borders. According to the discoverers, the synthesis of element 117 serves as definite proof of the existence of the "island of stability" (circled).

It has been calculated that the isotope ^{295}Ts would have a half-life of about 18 milliseconds, and it may be possible to produce this isotope via the same berkelium–calcium reaction used in the discoveries of the known isotopes, ^{293}Ts and ^{294}Ts. The chance of this reaction producing ^{295}Ts is estimated to be, at most, one-seventh the chance of producing ^{294}Ts. This isotope could also be produced in a pxn channel of the ^{249}Cf+^{48}Ca reaction that successfully produced oganesson, evaporating a proton alongside some neutrons; the heavier tennessine isotopes ^{296}Ts and ^{297}Ts could similarly be produced in the ^{251}Cf+^{48}Ca reaction. Calculations using a quantum tunneling model predict the existence of several isotopes of tennessine up to ^{303}Ts. The most stable of these is expected to be ^{296}Ts with an alpha-decay half-life of 40 milliseconds. A liquid drop model study on the element's isotopes shows similar results; it suggests a general trend of increasing stability for isotopes heavier than ^{301}Ts, with partial half-lives exceeding the age of the universe for the heaviest isotopes like ^{335}Ts when beta decay is not considered. Lighter isotopes of tennessine may be produced in the ^{243}Am+^{50}Ti reaction, which was considered as a contingency plan by the Dubna team in 2008 if ^{249}Bk proved unavailable; the isotopes ^{289}Ts through ^{292}Ts could also be produced as daughters of element 119 isotopes that can be produced in the ^{243}Am+^{54}Cr and ^{249}Bk+^{50}Ti reactions.

=== Atomic and physical ===
Tennessine is expected to be a member of group 17 in the periodic table, below the five halogens; fluorine, chlorine, bromine, iodine, and astatine, each of which has seven valence electrons with a configuration of ns^{2}np^{5}. (Note: The letter n stands for the number of the period (horizontal row in the periodic table) the element belongs to. The letters "s" and "p" denote the s and p atomic orbitals, and the subsequent superscript numbers denote the numbers of electrons in each. Hence the notation ns^{2}np^{5} means that the valence shells of lighter group 17 elements are composed of two s electrons and five p electrons, all located in the outermost electron energy level.) For tennessine, being in the seventh period (row) of the periodic table, continuing the trend would predict a valence electron configuration of 7s^{2}7p^{5}, and it would therefore be expected to behave similarly to the halogens in many respects that relate to this electronic state. However, going down group 17, the metallicity of the elements increases; for example, iodine already exhibits a metallic luster in the solid state, and astatine is expected to be a metal. As such, an extrapolation based on periodic trends would predict tennessine to be a rather volatile metal.

Atomic energy levels of outermost s, p, and d electrons of chlorine (d orbitals not applicable), bromine, iodine, astatine, and tennessine

Calculations have confirmed the accuracy of this simple extrapolation, although experimental verification of this is currently impossible as the half-lives of the known tennessine isotopes are too short. Significant differences between tennessine and the previous halogens are likely to arise, largely due to spin–orbit interaction—the mutual interaction between the motion and spin of electrons. The spin–orbit interaction is especially strong for the superheavy elements because their electrons move faster—at velocities comparable to the speed of light—than those in lighter atoms. In tennessine atoms, this lowers the 7s and the 7p electron energy levels, stabilizing the corresponding electrons, although two of the 7p electron energy levels are more stabilized than the other four. The stabilization of the 7s electrons is called the inert pair effect; the effect that separates the 7p subshell into the more-stabilized and the less-stabilized parts is called subshell splitting. Computational chemists understand the split as a change of the second (azimuthal) quantum number l from 1 to 1/2 and 3/2 for the more-stabilized and less-stabilized parts of the 7p subshell, respectively. (Note: The quantum number corresponds to the letter in the electron orbital name: 0 to s, 1 to p, 2 to d, etc. See azimuthal quantum number for more information.) For many theoretical purposes, the valence electron configuration may be represented to reflect the 7p subshell split as 7s^{2}7p^{2}_{1/2}7p^{3}_{3/2}.

Differences for other electron levels also exist. For example, the 6d electron levels (also split in two, with four being 6d_{3/2} and six being 6d_{5/2}) are both raised, so they are close in energy to the 7s ones, although no 6d electron chemistry has ever been predicted for tennessine. The difference between the 7p_{1/2} and 7p_{3/2} levels is abnormally high; 9.8 eV. Astatine's 6p subshell split is only 3.8 eV, and its 6p_{1/2} chemistry has already been called "limited". These effects cause tennessine's chemistry to differ from those of its upper neighbors (see below).

Tennessine's first ionization energy—the energy required to remove an electron from a neutral atom—is predicted to be 7.7 eV, lower than those of the halogens, again following the trend. Like its neighbors in the periodic table, tennessine is expected to have the lowest electron affinity—energy released when an electron is added to the atom—in its group; 2.6 or 1.8 eV. The electron of the hypothetical hydrogen-like tennessine atom—oxidized so it has only one electron, Ts^{116+}—is predicted to move so quickly that its mass is 1.90 times that of a non-moving electron, a feature attributable to relativistic effects. For comparison, the figure for hydrogen-like astatine is 1.27 and the figure for hydrogen-like iodine is 1.08. Simple extrapolations of relativity laws indicate a contraction of atomic radius. Advanced calculations show that the radius of a tennessine atom that has formed one covalent bond would be 165 pm, while that of astatine would be 147 pm. With the seven outermost electrons removed, tennessine is finally smaller; 57 pm for tennessine and 61 pm for astatine.

The melting and boiling points of tennessine are not known; earlier papers predicted about 350–500 °C and 550 °C, respectively, or 350–550 °C and 610 °C, respectively. These values exceed those of astatine and the lighter halogens, following periodic trends. A later paper predicts the boiling point of tennessine to be 345 °C (that of astatine is estimated as 309 °C, 337 °C, or 370 °C, although experimental values of 230 °C and 411 °C have been reported). The density of tennessine is expected to be between 7.1 and 7.3 g/cm^{3}.

=== Chemical ===
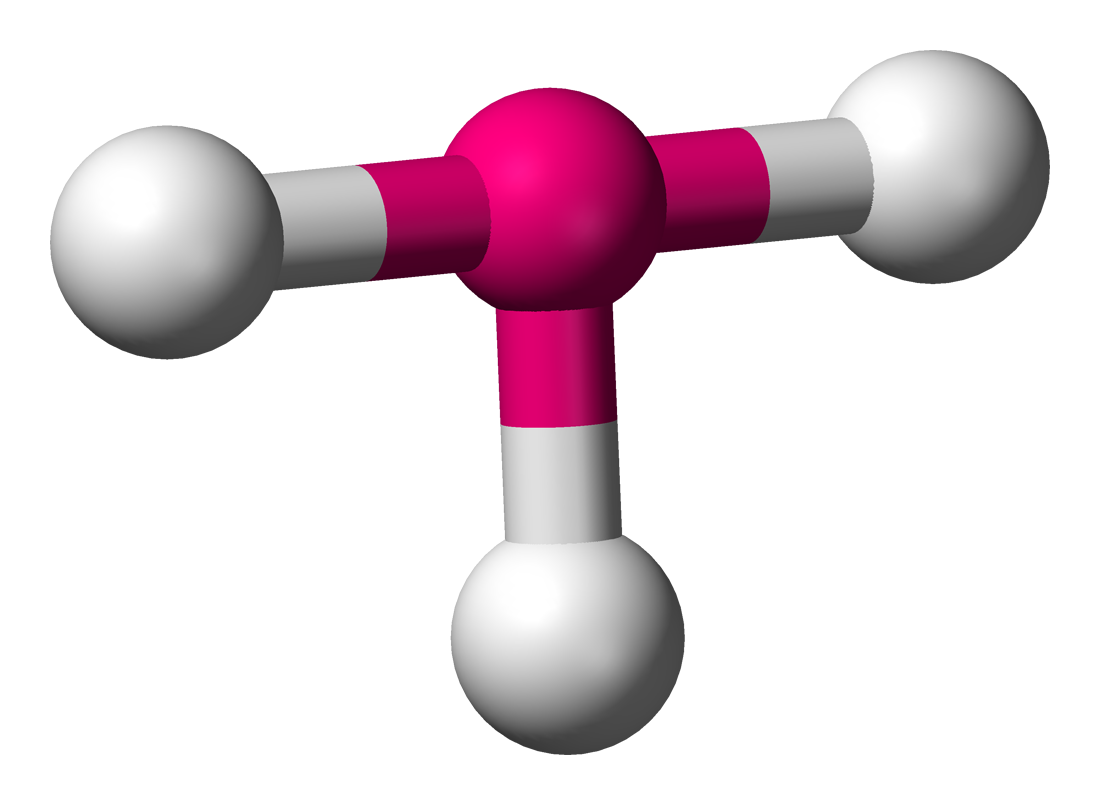
IF_{3} has a T-shape configuration.

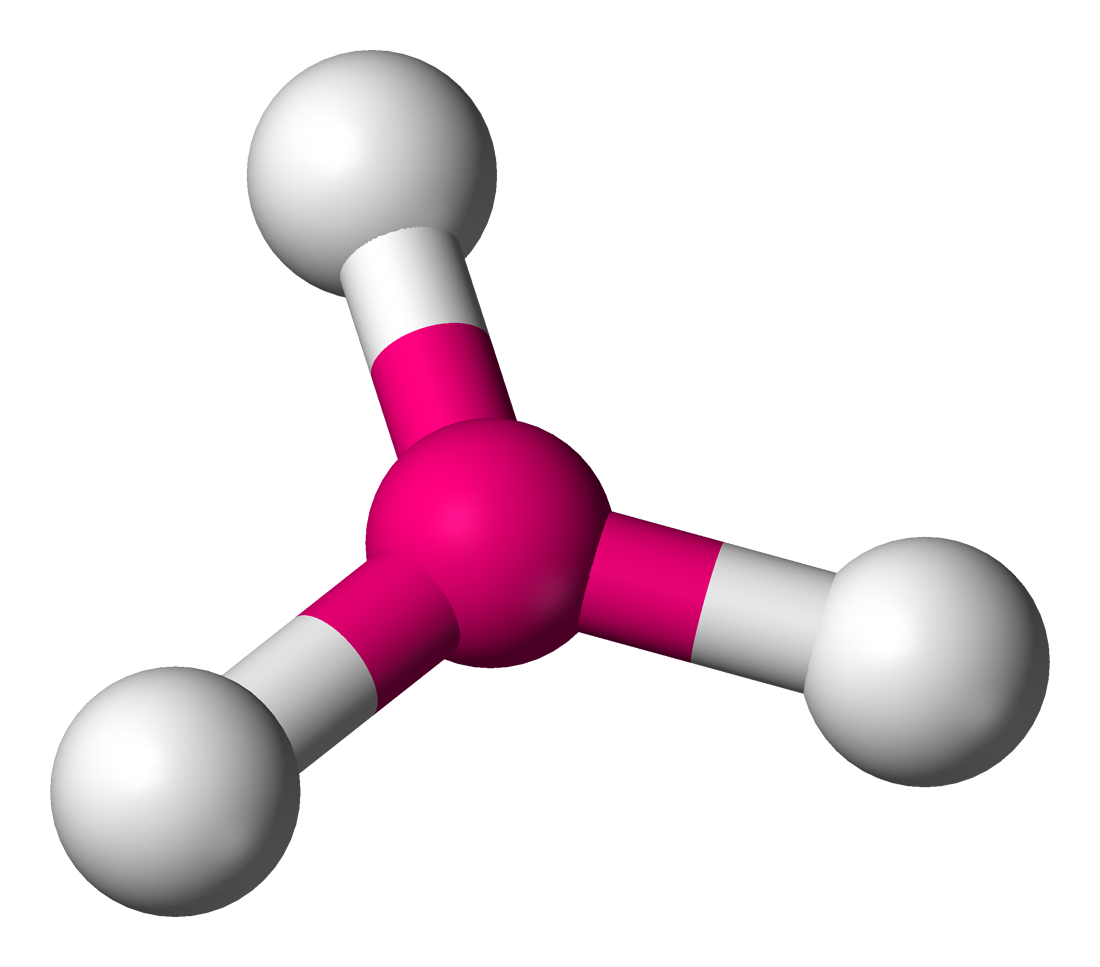
TsF_{3} is predicted to have a trigonal configuration.

The known isotopes of tennessine, ^{293}Ts and ^{294}Ts, are too short-lived to allow for chemical experimentation at present. Nevertheless, many chemical properties of tennessine have been calculated. Unlike the lighter group 17 elements, tennessine may not exhibit the chemical behavior common to the halogens. For example, fluorine, chlorine, bromine, and iodine routinely accept an electron to achieve the more stable electronic configuration of a noble gas, obtaining eight electrons (octet) in their valence shells instead of seven. This ability weakens as atomic weight increases going down the group; tennessine would be the least willing group 17 element to accept an electron. Of the oxidation states it is predicted to form, −1 is expected to be the least common. The standard reduction potential of the Ts/Ts^{−} couple is predicted to be −0.25 V; this value is negative, unlike for all the lighter halogens.

There is another opportunity for tennessine to complete its octet—by forming a covalent bond. Like the halogens, when two tennessine atoms meet they are expected to form a Ts–Ts bond to give a diatomic molecule. Such molecules are commonly bound via single sigma bonds between the atoms; these are different from pi bonds, which are divided into two parts, each shifted in a direction perpendicular to the line between the atoms, and opposite one another rather than being located directly between the atoms they bind. Sigma bonding has been calculated to show a great antibonding character in the At_{2} molecule and is not as favorable energetically. Tennessine is predicted to continue the trend; a strong pi character should be seen in the bonding of Ts_{2}. The molecule tennessine chloride (TsCl) is predicted to go further, being bonded with a single pi bond.

Aside from the unstable −1 state, three more oxidation states are predicted; +5, +3, and +1. The +1 state should be especially stable because of the destabilization of the three outermost 7p_{3/2} electrons, forming a stable, half-filled subshell configuration; astatine shows similar effects. The +3 state should be important, again due to the destabilized 7p_{3/2} electrons. The +5 state is predicted to be uncommon because the 7p_{1/2} electrons are oppositely stabilized. The +7 state has not been shown—even computationally—to be achievable. Because the 7s electrons are greatly stabilized, it has been hypothesized that tennessine effectively has only five valence electrons.

The simplest possible tennessine compound would be the monohydride, TsH. The bonding is expected to be provided by a 7p_{3/2} electron of tennessine and the 1s electron of hydrogen. The non-bonding nature of the 7p_{1/2} spinor is because tennessine is expected not to form purely sigma or pi bonds. Therefore, the destabilized (thus expanded) 7p_{3/2} spinor is responsible for bonding. This effect lengthens the TsH molecule by 17 picometers compared with the overall length of 195 pm. Since the tennessine p electron bonds are two-thirds sigma, the bond is only two-thirds as strong as it would be if tennessine featured no spin–orbit interactions. The molecule thus follows the trend for halogen hydrides, showing an increase in bond length and a decrease in dissociation energy compared to AtH. The molecules TlTs and NhTs may be viewed analogously, taking into account an opposite effect shown by the fact that the element's p_{1/2} electrons are stabilized. These two characteristics result in a relatively small dipole moment (product of difference between electric charges of atoms and displacement of the atoms) for TlTs; only 1.67 D, (Note: For comparison, the values for the ClF, HCl, SO, HF, and HI molecules are 0.89 D, 1.11 D, 1.55 D, 1.83 D, and 1.95 D. Values for molecules which do not form at standard conditions, namely GeSe, SnS, TlF, BaO, and NaCl, are 1.65 D, ~3.2 D, 4.23 D, 7.95 D, and 9.00 D.) the positive value implying that the negative charge is on the tennessine atom. For NhTs, the strength of the effects are predicted to cause a transfer of the electron from the tennessine atom to the nihonium atom, with the dipole moment value being −1.80 D. The spin–orbit interaction increases the dissociation energy of the TsF molecule because it lowers the electronegativity of tennessine, causing the bond with the extremely electronegative fluorine atom to have a more ionic character. Tennessine monofluoride should feature the strongest bonding of all group 17 monofluorides.

VSEPR theory predicts a bent-T-shaped molecular geometry for the group 17 trifluorides. All known halogen trifluorides have this molecular geometry and have a structure of AX_{3}E_{2}—a central atom, denoted A, surrounded by three ligands, X, and two unshared electron pairs, E. If relativistic effects are ignored, TsF_{3} should follow its lighter congeners in having a bent-T-shaped molecular geometry. More sophisticated predictions show that this molecular geometry would not be energetically favored for TsF_{3}, predicting instead a trigonal planar molecular geometry (AX_{3}E_{0}). This shows that VSEPR theory may not be consistent for the superheavy elements. The TsF_{3} molecule is predicted to be significantly stabilized by spin–orbit interactions; a possible rationale may be the large difference in electronegativity between tennessine and fluorine, giving the bond a partially ionic character.

== Bibliography ==
- Audi, G.; Kondev, F. G.; Wang, M.; Huang, W. J.; Naimi, S. (2017). "The NUBASE2016 evaluation of nuclear properties". Chinese Physics C. 41 (3) 030001. Bibcode:2017ChPhC..41c0001A. doi:10.1088/1674-1137/41/3/030001.
- Barysz, M.; Ishikawa, Y., eds. (2010). Relativistic methods for chemists. Challenges and advances in computational chemistry and physics. Vol. 10. Springer Science+Business Media. ISBN 978-1-4020-9974-8.

- Thayer, J. S. (2010). "Relativistic Effects and the Chemistry of the Heavier Main Group Elements". Relativistic Methods for Chemists. Challenges and Advances in Computational Chemistry and Physics. Vol. 10. p. 63. doi:10.1007/978-1-4020-9975-5_2. ISBN 978-1-4020-9974-8.
- Stysziński, J. (2010). "Why do we need relativistic computational methods?". Relativistic Methods for Chemists. Challenges and Advances in Computational Chemistry and Physics. Vol. 10. pp. 99–164. doi:10.1007/978-1-4020-9975-5_3. ISBN 978-1-4020-9974-8.
- Pershina, V. (2010). "Electronic structure and chemistry of the heaviest elements". Relativistic Methods for Chemists. Challenges and Advances in Computational Chemistry and Physics. Vol. 10. pp. 451–520. doi:10.1007/978-1-4020-9975-5_11. ISBN 978-1-4020-9974-8.

- Hoffman, D.C.; Ghiorso, A.; Seaborg, G.T. (2000). The Transuranium People: The Inside Story. World Scientific. ISBN 978-1-78-326244-1.
- Beiser, A. (2003). Concepts of modern physics (6th ed.). McGraw-Hill. ISBN 978-0-07-244848-1. OCLC 48965418.
- Kragh, H. (2018). From Transuranic to Superheavy Elements: A Story of Dispute and Creation. Springer. ISBN 978-3-319-75813-8.
- Zagrebaev, V.; Karpov, A.; Greiner, W. (2013). "Future of superheavy element research: Which nuclei could be synthesized within the next few years?". Journal of Physics: Conference Series. 420 (1): 1–15. arXiv:1207.5700. Bibcode:2013JPhCS.420a2001Z. doi:10.1088/1742-6596/420/1/012001. ISSN 1742-6588. S2CID 55434734. 012001.
