= Hope Michelsen =

American combustion scientist

Hope A. Michelsen is an American physical chemist and combustion scientist whose research involves the byproducts of combustion including soot, black carbon, greenhouse gases, the contribution of these substances to global warming, and the use of laser-induced incandescence to measure combustion products. She is an associate professor of mechanical engineering at the University of Colorado Boulder, in the Paul M. Rady Department of Mechanical Engineering.

== Education and career ==
Michelsen was an undergraduate at Dartmouth College. Initially majoring in English, she became interested in environmental science before graduating in 1984 with high honors in chemistry; she also earned the college's Chandler T. White 1916 Research Prize. She went to Stanford University for graduate study in chemistry, also working as a student researcher at the IBM Almaden Research Center, and supported in part by the Nellie Yeoh Whetten Award of the American Vacuum Society. She completed her Ph.D. in 1993. Her doctorate involved surface chemistry in electronics manufacturing, but looking for a change of pace, she switched her research interests afterwards to atmospheric chemistry.

After postdoctoral research at Harvard University, Michelsen became a staff scientist for Atmospheric and Environmental Research, Inc. in 1997, and a member of the technical staff in the Sandia National Laboratories Combustion Research Facility in 1999. She returned to academia in 2019, as an associate professor of mechanical engineering at the University of Colorado Boulder. In 2020 she added an affiliation with the university's program in environmental engineering.

== Recognition ==
Michelson was elected to the Alameda County (California) Women's Hall of Fame in 2013, the first woman from Sandia National Laboratories to be so honored.

She was named a Fellow of Optica (formerly the Optical Society of America) in 2017, "for pioneering contributions to the fundamental understanding of laser-radiation interactions with soot particles through laser-induced incandescence, absorption and scattering, and using laser-induced incandescence to assess environmental impacts of carbonaceous particles". She was elected as a Fellow of the American Physical Society (APS) in 2012, after a nomination from the APS Division of Chemical Physics, "for groundbreaking research in the chemical physics of combustion particulate formation and transformations, and for innovative and rigorous description of particle-radiation interactions".
