= Masterworks Chorale =

Choral ensemble based in San Mateo, California

Masterworks Chorale is a choral ensemble based in San Mateo, California.

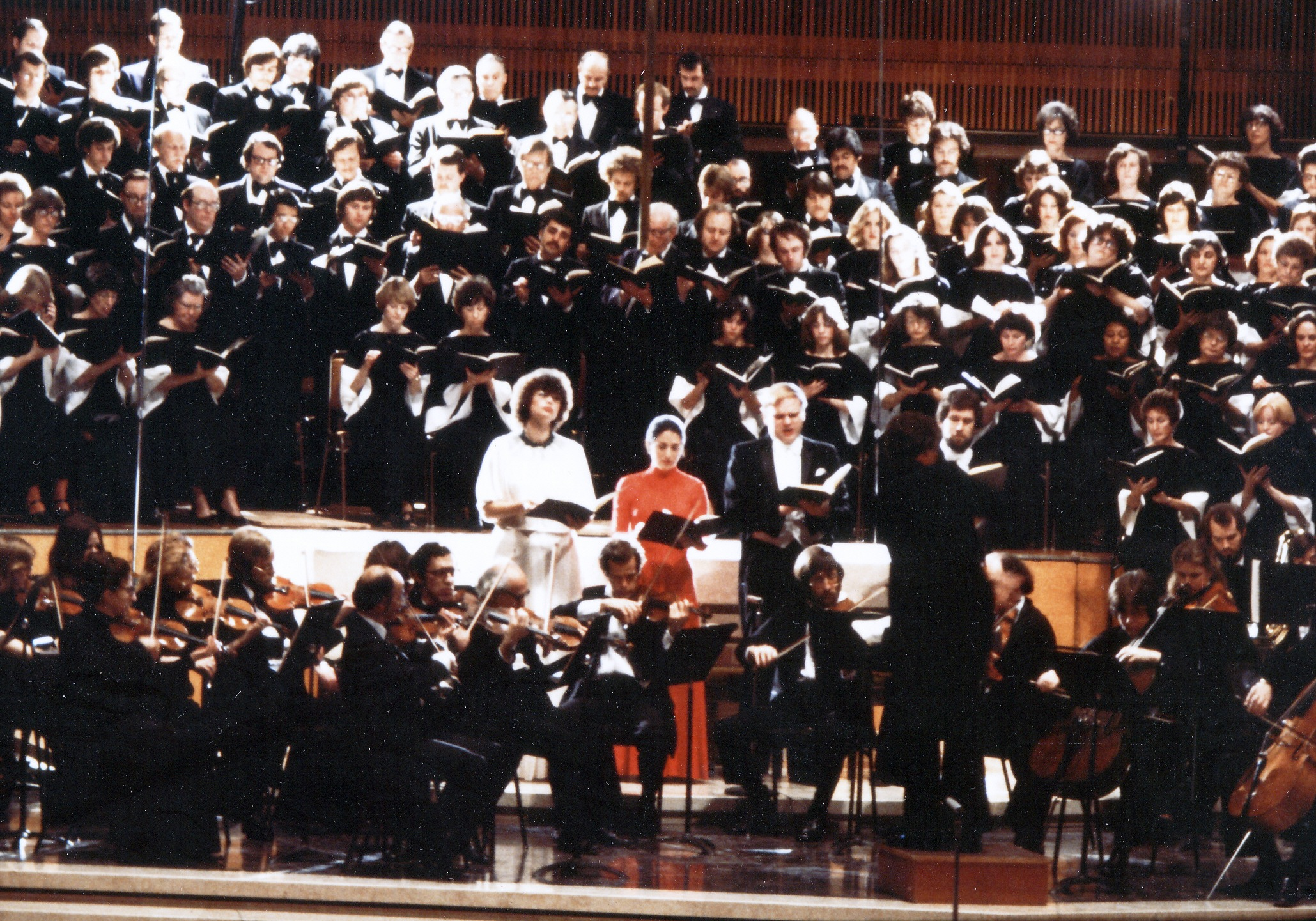
The Masterworks Chorale in concert at San Francisco's St. Mary's Cathedral on March 4, 1979

== About Masterworks Chorale ==
Masterworks Chorale is one of the oldest choruses in Northern California. Founded in 1964 by Galen Marshall (born 1934 in Greensburg, Kansas and died December 4, 2014), and currently conducted by Dr. Bryan Baker, the mixed chorus presently consists of 120 members and performs a wide variety of music from the Renaissance and Baroque to modern masterpieces. Masterworks is a community chorus in the best sense of the word; singers come from all over the Bay Area and vary in age from the 20s to the 80s. Each season the Chorale performs four concert sets and a summer program. The Fall and Spring concerts generally include major choral works in which the chorus is usually accompanied by a professional orchestra and renowned soloists. The December and March concerts are more intimate and give the Chorale a chance to sing shorter pieces, often without accompaniment. Chorale members must pass an audition to join the chorus, and many of the singers have had voice and/or choral training. Each rehearsal starts with 15 to 20 minutes of varied vocal exercises that are used to improve pitch and tone production.

Members of Masterworks Chorale have created a number of extra programs that reach out to the larger community. Outreach activities include Sing Out (for under-served children), Song Partners (for older adults coping with memory loss), Feel the Music (for children in the Deaf and Hard of Hearing community), Paint the Music (for everyone), and Pocket Choir (performing at schools, hospitals, community centers, eldercare facilities, and a variety of community events).

== History ==
Masterworks Chorale was initially called the San Mateo College Community Chorus and performed with an orchestra of students, faculty, and members of the community, either in the Little Theatre or the main gymnasium at the College of San Mateo. During its early years under Galen Marshall the chorus gradually grew in size and started giving concerts throughout the San Francisco Bay Area. In 1972 the group was renamed the Masterworks Chorale and gave its first complete performance of Handel's Messiah that December at St. Bartholomew's Church, San Mateo. In May 1985 it became a self-sufficient non-profit organization.

In the summer of 1982, Masterworks Chorale sang in three performances of Mozart's Requiem during the Midsummer Mozart Festival. The performances were conducted by Calvin E. Simmons (1950–1982); they were among of his last appearances before his tragic death later that year. In September 1984, Masterworks was one of four choirs chosen to participate in four performances of the Eighth Symphony of Gustav Mahler by the San Francisco Symphony Orchestra under Edo de Waart in Davies Symphony Hall. Other Northern California concerts have included performances with the San Francisco Opera, San José Symphony, and at the Festival of Masses and the Cabrillo Festival.

One of the most famous performances took place on December 12, 1988, when Masterworks, Geneva’s Suisse Romande Choir, and the USSR State Academy Russian Choir—all linked by satellite—joined the World Philharmonic Orchestra in Montreal to sing “Ode to Joy” from Beethoven’s Ninth Symphony. At the time, this was an unprecedented event made possible by the latest satellite transmission technologies and the challenge of Françoise Legrand, musical director and co-founder of the World Philharmonic Orchestra. This concert made Beethoven’s vision a reality: to have people around the world sing “Ode to Joy” at the same time.

The 25th Anniversary of the Chorale, in 1989, featured the World Premiere of Alexander C. Post's Sea of Light, commissioned by the choir for the anniversary celebration. To celebrate its 30th anniversary in 1994, Masterworks took a Central European tour; the tour included performances in Brno, Kraków, Budapest, and Prague, accompanied by the Brno Concert Orchestra and the Budapest Concert Orchestra. The tour featured the Beethoven Choral Fantasy with pianist Jon Nakamatsu, who three years later won the acclaimed Van Cliburn International Piano Competition. Masterworks’ 40th anniversary concert featured Borodin’s Polovetsian Dances, Brahms’ Nänie, and Beethoven’s Choral Fantasy, again with pianist Jon Nakamatsu. Metropolitan Opera soprano Luana De Vol joined in the 42nd concert year Opera Gala. Highlights of the 50th season were performances of Elijah by Mendelssohn and Carmina Burana, and a gala at Hillsborough’s iconic Carolands Chateau. Carmina Burana was performed—with some staging and costumes—with the Valley Concert Chorale, also celebrating 50 years; the choruses were joined by Sarah Bush Dance Company and Ragazzi Boys’ Chorus.

Masterworks Chorale has taken part in many tours over the years, including a tour of the People’s Republic of China, a tour of Brazil, several trips to New York City including a performance of the Verdi Requiem at Carnegie Hall, and eight European tours. The trip to China (1985) included performances in Beijing, Shanghai, Guangzhou, and Hong Kong. The tour of Brazil (2007) included concerts in Manaus, Metropolis, Ouro Preto, and Rio de Janeiro. Then in 2009, some members of Masterworks joined other chorus members to sing at Avery Fisher Hall in New York, performing new music by Eric Whitacre as well as short pieces from their repertoire. That New York trip was so successful that it was repeated in 2010, this time with a performance of Whitacre’s Paradise Lost: Shadows and Wings, in Carnegie Hall. Following this, there was a New York visit in 2014, when the Chorale sang Carmina Burana in Carnegie Hall, with Vance George conducting. Of the many tours to Europe, the most recent was to Central Europe (2017), with performances in Prague, Budapest, and Vienna. The music included selections from Rachmaninov’s All-Night Vigil, Fauré’s “Cantique de Jean Racine,” works by Lauridsen, Whitacre, and Gjielo, and spirituals.

In the fall of 1997, Galen Marshall retired and was named Artistic Director Emeritus. Galen Marshall was succeeded by Richard Garrin, a former assistant director of the Chicago Symphony Chorus. In 2002 Richard Garrin moved to New York, and Dr. Bryan Baker was appointed as the Artistic Director and Conductor.

Since 2002, Dr. Baker has led the Chorale in many of the major choral-orchestral works, including Verdi’s Requiem, Orff’s Carmina Burana, Mozart’s Grea Mass in C minor, Requiem, and Coronation Mass, and the Requiems of Fauré and Duruflé. He has also introduced works that are new to the group, for example, Vivaldi’s Magnificat, Handel’s Laudate Pueri, and Lauridsen’s Lux Aeterna, as well as works by Corigliano, Whitacre, and Gjielo. In addition to his dedication to Masterworks, Dr. Baker is the Director of Music at the Unitarian Universalist Church of Berkeley and founder and director of the chamber choir Serenade, which performs concerts around the Bay Area in more intimate settings. He previously taught at Truman State University, Arizona State University, Cañada College, Foothill College, and San Francisco State University.

The principal accompanist since 2008 has been Inara Morgenstern, who has taken an active role in the San Francisco Bay Area classical music scene for more than three decades, in both teaching and performing roles.

Masterworks Chorale has earned several awards in recent years. In 2010, it received the prestigious Diamond Award from the Peninsula Arts Council, which recognizes individuals and organizations for their artistic achievements and contributions to the arts. Again in 2012, Dr. Baker received the Diamond Award for Individual Artist. Then in 2017, the Chorale received a Best of the Bay award from San Francisco Classical Voice for its performance of Verdi’s Requiem; again in 2018, the Chorale received a Best of the Bay award for Best Discovery, indicating that new audiences are being reached.
