= Julie Ezold =

Nuclear engineer

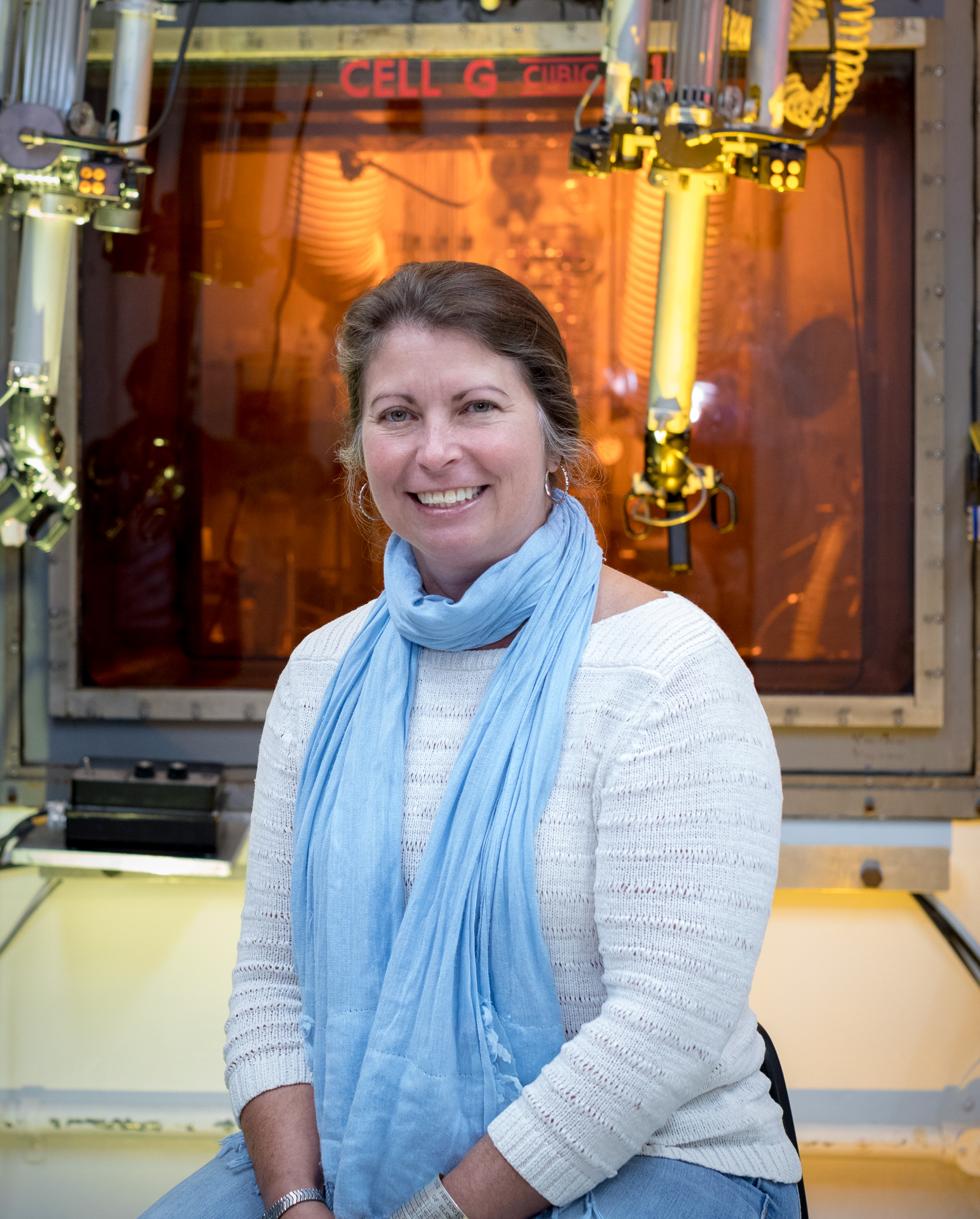
- Ezold at Oak Ridge National Laboratory in 2018
- Born: Julie Graudons
- Education: Rensselaer Polytechnic Institute; North Carolina State University, Raleigh
- Known for: Tennessine
- Scientific career
- Workplaces: Oak Ridge National Laboratory
- Website: www.ornl.gov/staff-profile/julie-g-ezold

Julie Ezold (née Graudons) is a nuclear engineer at the Oak Ridge National Laboratory. She is campaign manager for the 252-Californium Campaign and was involved with the discovery of tennessine.

== Early life and education ==
Ezold took lessons and performed in ballet, tap, jazz, and baton at Merritt's Dance Center in Schenectady, New York. In her fifth year she received an award for her examinations at Merritt. Her sixth grade teacher encouraged Ezold to pursue radio and nuclear chemistry due to her early interests in the field. During high school Ezold completed a summer program in nuclear chemistry at the University of Lynchburg. She studied nuclear engineering at Rensselaer Polytechnic Institute, graduating in 1990. She earned her master's degree in nuclear engineering in 1992 at North Carolina State University, Raleigh, NC using the High Flux Isotope Reactor at Oak Ridge National Laboratory.

== Career ==
Ezold has worked at Oak Ridge National Laboratory since completing her postgraduate studies in 1992. Her early work considered Iodine-129 using Neutron Activation Analysis. She is the Californium Program manager, responsible for producing 252-Californium, 249-Berkelium and 252-Einsteinium. One microgram of Californium-252 can emit 2 million neutrons a second. Her work concentrates on transuranium elements and applications.

She received the US Department of Energy Defense Programs Award of Excellence in 2002. Her commitments to education were recognized at the UT-Battelle Awards Night for Exceptional Community Outreach. In 2009 she earned a Presidential Citation from the American Nuclear Society. She was awarded the Patricia Bryant Leadership Award of Nuclear Energy Institute's Women in Nuclear group. In 2010 Ezold was one of the team who discovered Tennessine. She studied the reactions of Berkelium-249 and Calcium-48, directly involved in the experiments and production of Berkelium-249 at Oak Ridge National Laboratory. Her recent work looks to optimize the production of transcurium isotopes. Also, for nuclear isotopes like nickel-63, selenium-75, and neptunium-237, Ezold designs and directs safe and efficient nuclear material processing research and development.

=== Awards and honors ===
In 2018 she was recognized by Marquis Who's Who Top Engineers for her sustained contributions to nuclear engineering.

In 2009 Ezold her leadership was recognized by the Nuclear Endergy Institute with the "Patricia Bryant Leadership Award for Women in Nuclear".

In 2025 Ezgold received the American Nuclear Society's Landis Public Communication and Education Award, recognizing her work advancing public understanding of nuclear science.
