= Broadway by the Bay =

Musical theatre company

Broadway by the Bay was a community-based musical theatre company located in the San Francisco Bay Area and performing in Redwood City. It also provided a "Theatre Arts Academy" offering performing arts experiences to local children. After beginning with productions of three annual Gilbert and Sullivan productions, the company shifted its focus to modern musicals in 1966. In the following years, it continuously produced musicals in San Mateo County. In 1983, the group changed its name to Peninsula Civic Light Opera, and again in 1999, to Broadway by the Bay. The company's planned 2020 season was cancelled due to venue closures triggered by the COVID-19 pandemic lockdowns. In 2021, the company's executive artistic director told press that the company would likely be on hiatus until at least 2022.

== History ==
Broadway by the Bay was an outgrowth of a San Mateo Recreation Department program that originated in the 1950s as "La Honda Music Camp", in Jones Gulch, near La Honda, California in the Santa Cruz Mountains. Each summer, that program employed the talents of young musicians, singers, and actors to produce primarily Gilbert and Sullivan's comic operas, which were staged at the camp site in Jones Gulch near La Honda, California.

In June 1963, the San Mateo Recreation Department established the San Mateo Community Theatre, with Dr. Randolph Hunt (1925-2011) as music director and Robert Lynch as drama director, at Hillsdale High School in San Mateo, California.

=== First productions: Gilbert and Sullivan ===
The first production was Patience, in August 1963 in the little theatre at Hillsdale High School, with a cast of high school and college students that included future opera singer Luana De Vol in the part of Saphir. In the summer of 1964, Hunt and Lynch collaborated on The Mikado, again at Hillsdale High School. In 1965, Anthony "Duke" Campagna, the band director at Hillsdale High School, worked with Lynch on a production of H.M.S. Pinafore.

=== Move to musical theatre ===
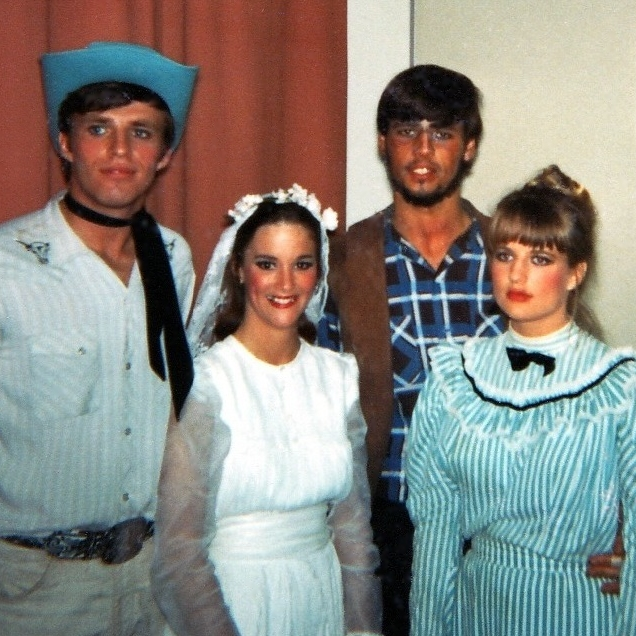
Members of the cast of the 1966 production of Oklahoma!

After presenting the three Gilbert and Sullivan operas, the San Mateo Community Theatre moved in a different direction. Although Campagna returned, he was joined by a staff that included Kenneth L. Ton, the drama director at Capuchino High School, and Ben Denton, the choral director at Aragon High School. For the first time, in 1966, SMCT presented a classic Broadway musical: Oklahoma! by Rodgers and Hammerstein. Once again, the cast and orchestra were drawn from high school and college students throughout San Mateo County. The performances were moved to the little theater at the College of San Mateo. The production was a success and encouraged SMCT to produce more musicals.

Hunt returned as a director for the 1967 production of West Side Story by Leonard Bernstein and Stephen Sondheim. The performances were given at the auditorium at San Mateo High School, later known as the San Mateo Performing Arts Center. This remained the home of the company until 2011. The company continued to produce musicals each year, and later productions mixed professional and semi-professional talent with amateur singers and dancers, increasing the quality of the shows.

The San Mateo Community Theatre became a non-profit organization in 1978. In 1983, the Board of Directors expanded the focus of the company and changed the name to Peninsula Civic Light Opera. In 1999, a decision was made to gradually change the name to Broadway by the Bay to more accurately reflect the group's focus on Broadway-type musicals instead of light operas.

=== "Broadway by the Bay" ===
Under its new name, Broadway by the Bay's production schedule featured four full-scale musical theatre productions each year. The actors, ushers, and some of the musicians were volunteers.

In 2010, composer-lyricist Jason Robert Brown offered classes and performed a concert to help fundraise for Broadway by the Bay's Youth Theatre Conservatory, which offered performing arts experiences to local children. In 2011, Broadway by the Bay moved to the Fox Theatre in Redwood City, California, and went on to sign a five-year lease with them in 2016.

The company's 2014 season included performances of Evita, In the Heights, Dreamgirls, and Anything Goes. The 2015 season included Kiss Me, Kate, West Side Story, My Fair Lady, and more. A review in San Jose Mercury News called the company's 2009 production of The Full Monty "strong and fast-paced...typical of Broadway by the Bay. [Its choreography was] smooth, clever, and wonderfully funny. There is much good acting, singing and dancing."

== Indefinite Hiatus ==
The company's final performance at Redwood City's Fox Theatre was Into the Woods in November 2019. According to an interview given by then-executive artistic director Alicia Jeffrey, Broadway by the Bay's long-term partnership with the Fox Theatre ended due to the theatre's "different priorities for their venue."

For its planned spring 2020 production of The Sound of Music, the company made a temporary move to the College of San Mateo Theatre, but the show was closed one day prior to its opening due to the March 2020 COVID-19 lockdown. Broadway by the Bay subsequently announced its decision to cancel the entirety of its planned 2020 season.

The San Francisco Examiner reported in August 2021 that Broadway by the Bay would likely not emerge from hiatus until at least 2022. In response to a June 2022 fan inquiry about its future production schedule, the company posted on its Facebook page, "Without a permanent venue right now, we are taking a moment to really evaluate what will work best for our organization."

In September of 2026, the San Mateo Daily Journal reported the launch of a new theater company called Broadway on the Bay. The board president of the new company mentioned that the board of Broadway by the Bay was providing guidance on long-term sustainability to its similarly-named counterpart.
