= Calvin Simmons =

American conductor (1950–1982)

Calvin Eugene Simmons (April 27, 1950 – August 21, 1982) was an American symphony orchestra conductor. He was the first African-American conductor of a major orchestra.

== Life and career ==
Simmons was born in San Francisco, California, in 1950. At the age of 9, he entered the Bay Area's musical scene and began living his dream of becoming a world-class musician. He had been taught the piano from an early age by his mother, Matty. By age 11, he was conducting the San Francisco Boys Chorus, started by Madi Bacon, of which he had been a member. Bacon gave him the early artistic freedom to assist with the chorus that would serve him and others for years. Calvin attended Balboa High School in San Francisco. After studying with Max Rudolf at the Curtis Institute of Music 1970–1973, he was assistant conductor with the San Francisco Opera from 1972 to 1975, winning the Kurt Herbert Adler Award.

After working as assistant conductor of the Los Angeles Philharmonic under Zubin Mehta, Simmons became musical director of the Oakland Symphony Orchestra at age 28; he led the orchestra for four years. He continued to conduct the Los Angeles Philharmonic, both at the Dorothy Chandler Pavilion and at the Hollywood Bowl. He would support Carmen McRae singing jazz one night, then conduct William Walton or Holst's The Planets a night or two later. He was the first African-American to be named conductor of a major U.S. symphony orchestra, and was a frequent guest conductor with some of the nation's major opera companies and orchestras (such as the Philadelphia Orchestra). He was the music director at the Ojai Music Festival in 1978.

He made his debut at the Metropolitan Opera on 20 December 1978, aged 28, conducting Engelbert Humperdinck's Hansel and Gretel. He returned the following season for the same opera, of which he conducted a total of 18 performances. He was on the musical staff at Glyndebourne from 1974 to 1978, and conducted the Glyndebourne Touring Opera, including Così fan tutte in 1975. He collaborated with the British director Jonathan Miller on a celebrated production of Mozart's Così fan tutte at the Opera Theater of St. Louis (USA) shortly before his death.

He remained active at the San Francisco Opera for all his adult life, supporting General Director Kurt Herbert Adler, first as a repetiteur and then as a member of the conducting staff. He made his formal debut conducting Giacomo Puccini's La Bohème with Ileana Cotrubas. His later work on a production of Dmitri Shostakovich's Lady Macbeth of the Mtsensk District drew national attention. In 1979 he conducted the premiere of Menotti's La Loca at San Diego.

His final concerts were three performances of the Requiem of Wolfgang Amadeus Mozart in the summer of 1982 with the Masterworks Chorale and the Midsummer Mozart Festival Orchestra.

== Other work ==
The short story "Addio San Francisco", which appears in the anthology Murder at the Opera (Mysterious Press, 1989), was written by Simmons with editor Thomas Godfrey, under a pseudonym.

== Death ==
Simmons died in a canoeing accident at age 32 near Lake Placid in New York. After a large public funeral at San Francisco's Grace Cathedral, he was buried in Cypress Lawn Memorial Park in Colma, California. At a memorial concert held in Oakland's Paramount Theater a few weeks later, he was remembered for his talent, his quick wit and sense of fun, and his ability to get on top of any score quickly.

== Legacy ==
The Oakland Symphony Orchestra was reorganized in July 1988 as the Oakland East Bay Symphony Orchestra. Simmons was honored by the naming of the Calvin Simmons Theatre at the Henry J. Kaiser Convention Center in Oakland, California. The Calvin Simmons Middle School in Oakland was named for him, but has since changed its name to United For Success Academy. Simmons is also the namesake of the grand ballroom of the Oakland Marriott Hotel.

His death inspired Lou Harrison to compose Elegy, To The Memory Of Calvin Simmons; Michael Tippett to compose The Blue Guitar, a sonata for solo guitar; and Robert Hughes to compose Sop'o muerte se cande, for high tenor and orchestra (1983, 2013). John Harbison wrote Exequien for Calvin Simmons. Simmons conducted Harbison's Violin Concerto shortly before his death.
