= Luana DeVol =

American opera singer

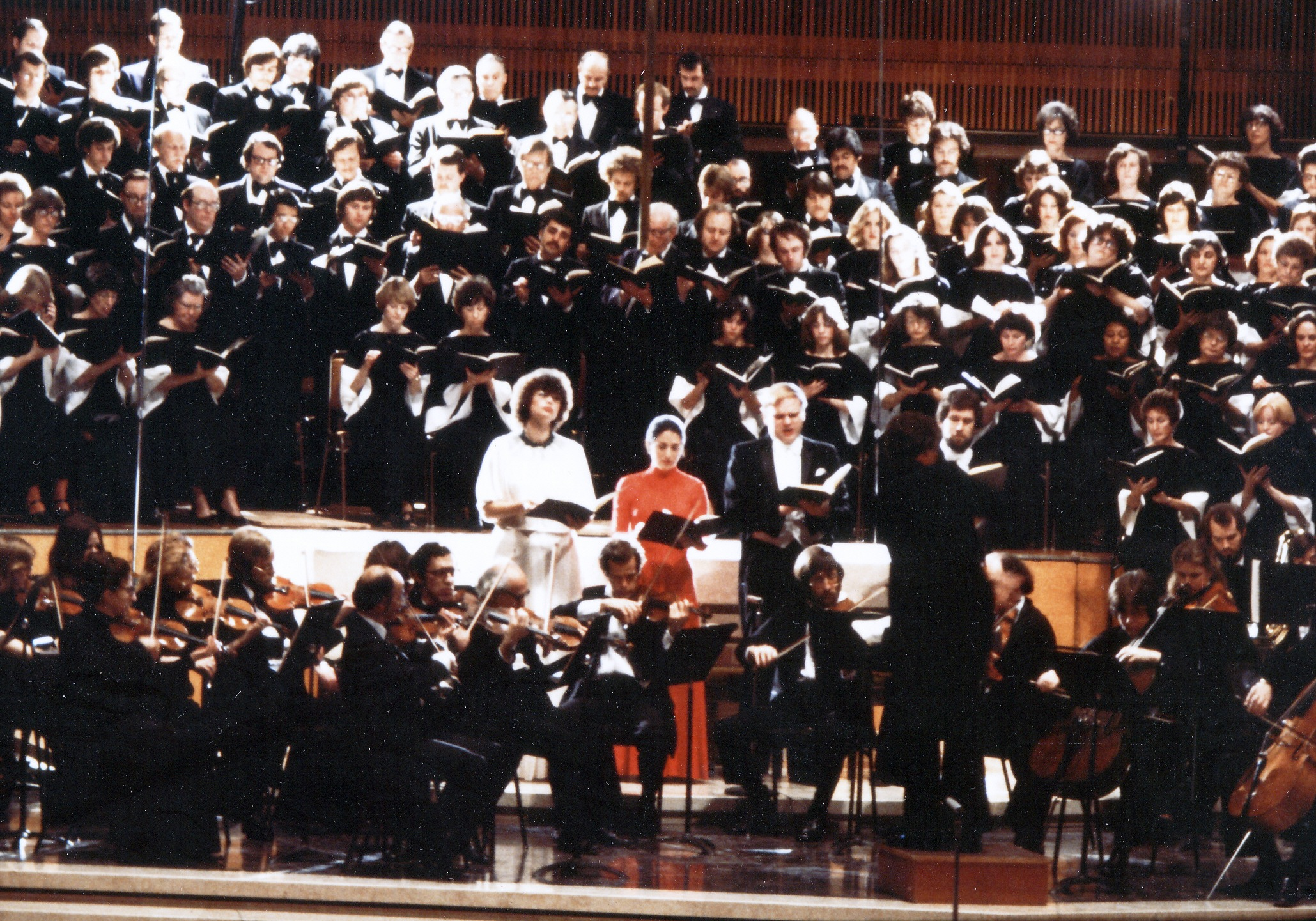
Luana DeVol frequently sang with the Masterworks Chorale. She can be seen on the left of the quartet of soloists in this 1979 performance.

Luana DeVol (born November 30, 1942, in San Mateo, California) is an American operatic soprano who made her Metropolitan Opera debut as Ortrud in April 2006 in Wagner's Lohengrin. The production was broadcast internationally on April 29, 2006. She was named "Singer of the Year" in 1997 and 2000 by the German opera magazine Opernwelt.

== Early life and education ==
DeVol graduated from Capuchino High School in San Bruno, California, where she grew up, and attended the College of San Mateo in San Mateo. She had a featured role in a production of Patience by Gilbert and Sullivan, the very first performances by the San Mateo Community Theatre, in the summer of 1963.

== Career ==
Since the mid-1980s, DeVol has sung primarily in Europe and has enjoyed success in the German repertoire. She was a featured soloist with the Masterworks Chorale in San Mateo under the direction of Galen Marshall, and sang in a great variety of choral works, especially by Ludwig van Beethoven and Johannes Brahms. DeVol appeared with the San Francisco Symphony and the San Francisco Opera. She moved to Germany in 1984 to further pursue her career, giving numerous operatic performances there.

DeVol has been featured on recordings released by the Bayer Music Group.
