= Hope Ishii =

American scientist

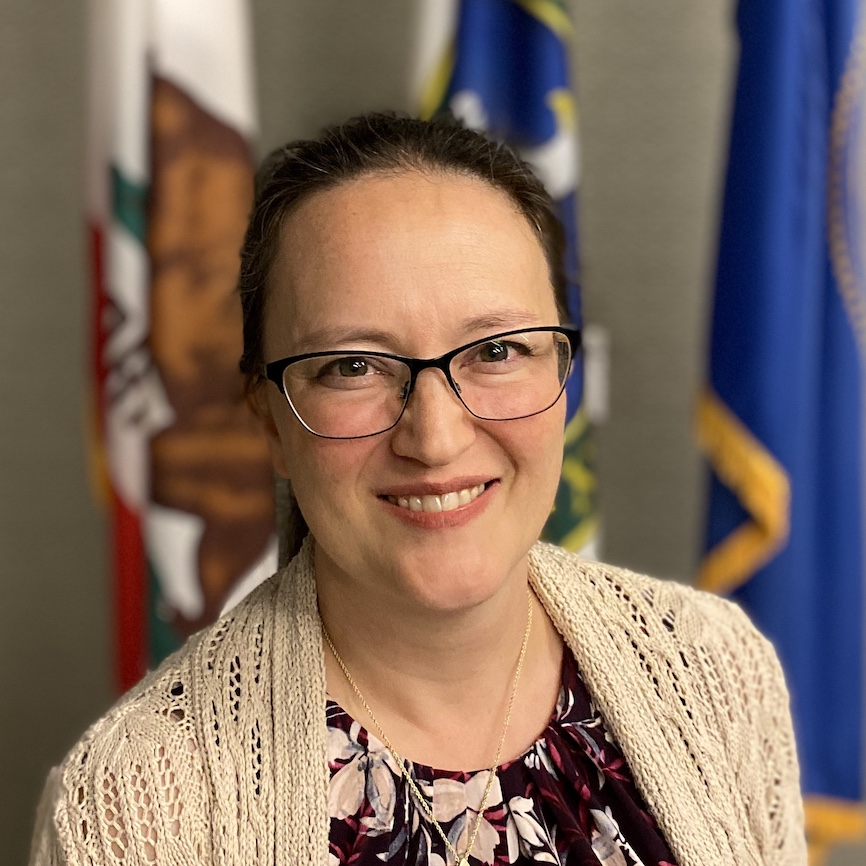
- Ishii in 2019
- Education: Stanford University, Chalmers University, Cornell University
- Known for: Study of cometary and interstellar dust
- Scientific career
- Workplaces: University of Hawaiʻi

Hope A. Ishii is an American scientist and the Director of the Advanced Electron Microscopy Center at the Hawai'i Institute of Geophysics and Planetology (HIGP) at the University of Hawaiʻi. Her work focuses on analysis and characterization of small solar system objects such as comet and asteroid dust, primarily by means of electron microscopy and x-ray spectroscopy, sometime from samples collected in space using aerogel. She is a research faculty member at the University of Hawaiʻi at Mānoa, and an affiliate researcher at Lawrence Berkeley National Laboratory.

== Education ==
Ishii received her Ph.D from Stanford University in 2002, working on the characterization of amorphous Molybdenum-Germanium alloy by anomalous x-ray scattering; her MS in Physics and Engineering from Chalmers University of Technology, 1995 and her BS in Material Science and Engineering from Cornell University in 1994.
