= Madi Bacon =

American choir director (1906–2001)

Maria "Madi" Helena Bacon (1906–2001) was an American musician, choral conductor, educator and athlete. She founded the San Francisco Boys Chorus (SFBC), the first boys' repertory chorus in the nation. Bacon served as the music director of the group until her retirement in 1972.

== Family ==
Bacon was born in Chicago on February 15, 1906, to Dr. Charles Sumner Bacon and Marie Francisca Emile von Rosthorn, an Austrian countess. Her father was chairman of the obstetrics and gynecology department at the University of Illinois. She had four older brothers, one of whom died in infancy. One of her brothers was the composer Ernst Bacon, for whom she was a relentless champion. Bacon's mother tutored her at home until she was 11.

Bacon never married.

== Education and career ==
As early as the seventh grade, at Chicago's Francis Parker School, Bacon organized a school orchestra. She graduated from high school in 1922 and obtained an undergraduate degree in romance languages from the University of Chicago.

From 1922 to 1923, perhaps through the close connection of her parents to Jane Addams, she worked at Chicago's Hull House, teaching art.

In February of 1928, Bacon was hired as a tennis teacher at the Katherine Branson School in Marin County, California. The following year, she became the school's first music teacher.

In 1931, she taught music at Glencoe Public School. Never having had any formal classes in music history, she studied music history on her own. Bacon was the founding conductor of the Winnetka Mixed Chorus, founded in 1936, and which became the North Shore Choral Society. It is the oldest choral organization on the North Shore of Lake Michigan. It was born in Winnetka as a men's chorus. The first rehearsal as a mixed chorus was held on March 3, 1936, under the direction of Bacon, who received an annual salary of $250.

In 1940, Bacon created Chicago's Elizabethan Madrigal Singers.

She also attended Tanglewood in the Massachusetts Berkshires, to study conducting under Serge Koussevitzky and Stanley Chapple, alongside Leonard Bernstein and others.

In 1941, Bacon received an MA from the University of Chicago, studying under Carl Bricken.

In 1941, she was also the music director at Roycemore School in Evanston, Illinois. She joined the faculty of the Central YMCA College in Chicago, whose faculty later transformed itself into Roosevelt University. She was made dean in December 1942. The Central YMCA College opened in 1919. It was actively diverse and identified itself as "liberal in spirit." Its president was Edward "Jim" Sparling, who fought with an increasingly "illiberal and discriminatory" board. In 1945, 62 of 63 faculty members decided to resign and create Roosevelt University.

In 1946, she headed the Music Extension Division at the University of California, Berkeley, where she expanded the extension program and created a community choir. She firmly believed in creating musical opportunities for the community. She taught conducting at Holy Name College in Oakland. While in Berkeley, she studied piano under Alexander Raab.

In 1948, Gaetano Merola, then director of the San Francisco Opera, and Kurt Herbert Adler, its artistic director, invited her to recruit and train boys to perform in Carmen and La bohème. Bacon's major achievement was to form what at that time was the country's only boys' opera repertory chorus, the San Francisco Boys Chorus, which became a feeder for the San Francisco Opera and other operas, as well as nurturing a number of major international musical talents.

Bacon guided several important conductors who came through the San Francisco Boys Chorus, including Calvin Simmons and Kent Nagano.

== Other ==
Bacon was an avid swimmer, and swimming teacher and also a Red Cross life-saver. One November day in 1933, she tried to save a man from drowning. A number of people gathered to watch, but Bacon was the only person to strip down removing her excess clothing. Although the man died, she received a letter from a friend of the drowned man, which said, "Since you risked your life, you might like to know the kind of person you did it for. He was a Greek of high character. He had three beautiful daughters."

She met Albert Einstein while in high school. After she had graduated from the University of Chicago, because she was a bilingual German speaker, she was assigned to translate for him when he gave several lectures on peace at the Covenant Club in Chicago. She was strongly moved by the announcement of his death.

She had a lifelong interest in the outdoors, and was a member of the Sierra Club. She climbed and hiked all over the world.

She lived in Berkeley, California from 1946 until her death, teaching voice and conducting until the last few years.

== Honors ==
Bacon was an honorary member of Sigma Alpha Iota; this indicates a woman "who has achieved international distinction in the music profession who is not an initiated member or Sigma Alpha Iota."

She was inducted into the Alameda County Women’s Hall of Fame in 1994.

== Discography ==
- Vince Guaraldi With the San Francisco Boys Chorus, 1967, D&D – VG 1116, (LP, Mono)
- Mussorgsky, Leopold Stokowski, the San Francisco Symphony Orchestra, Nicola Rossi-Lemeny, San Francisco Opera Chorus, Kurt Herbert Adler - Boris Godounoff – Highlights, 1953, RCA Victor Red Seal – LM 1764, (LP, Mono)
