= Alta Bates Summit Medical Center =

Hospital in California, United States

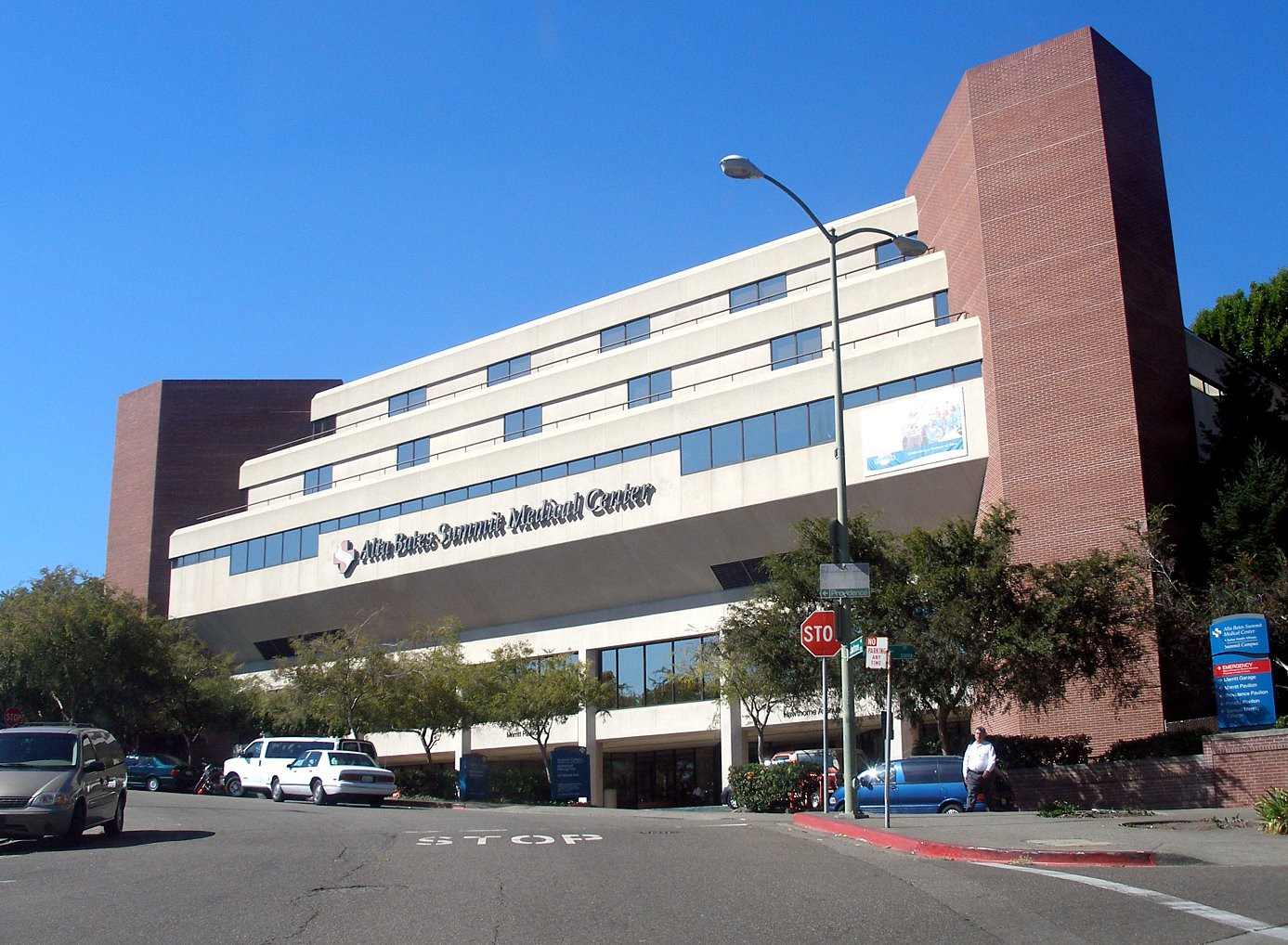
Alta Bates Summit Medical Center, Summit Campus in Oakland, California

Sutter Health Alta Bates Summit Medical Center is located in the East Bay of the San Francisco Bay Area. Its three hospital campuses are located in Berkeley (Alta Bates Campus, Herrick Campus) and Oakland (Summit Campus). Alta Bates Summit is a non-profit community-based medical center and is part of Sutter Health.

== History ==
=== Alta Bates Campus ===
The flagship Berkeley campus of the medical center was named after Alta Miner Bates, the nurse who founded the hospital in 1905. Bates was a prominent early California nurse anesthetist. The first graduate of a nurse training program in Eureka, California, she was among the first female anesthetists in the San Francisco Bay Area, administering over 14,000 anesthetics during her career. Until her retirement in 1949, Bates served as the hospital's director and was president of its board.

Alta Bates Hospital, later renamed Alta Bates Medical Center until its merger with Summit Medical Center in 1999, is now known as the Alta Bates Campus of Alta Bates Summit Medical Center.

=== Proposed Alta Bates Emeryville campus ===
In February 2025, Sutter Health announced plans to invest US$1 billion in a new medical campus in Emeryville, designed to eventually replace the Alta Bates acute care campus in Berkeley. The new development will be implemented in phases, with two existing buildings at 5555 Hollis Street and 5300 Chiron Street repurposed to provide outpatient services and specialty clinics starting in 2028. A flagship hospital—located at the intersection of 53rd and Horton Streets—is slated to open in 2033, featuring at least 200 beds, emergency services, an intensive care unit, and private patient rooms.

The project is part of Sutter Health’s broader strategy to address seismic compliance challenges affecting older hospital facilities across California. Once completed, the expansion is expected to boost the organization’s capacity from approximately 480,000 to 800,000 patients. In addition, local officials in Emeryville have welcomed the development for its anticipated economic benefits, including significant job creation and increased business activity in the region. The existing Alta Bates campus in Berkeley is planned to be repurposed as an ambulatory surgery center, urgent care clinic, and possibly a skilled nursing facility.

=== Herrick Campus ===
In 1904, Dr. LeRoy Francis Herrick, a graduate of the Kentucky College of Medicine (1893), purchased a Berkeley mansion known as the Hume House, located on the same block upon which the current Herrick Campus is situated, between Dwight and Channing Ways, and Milvia and Grove (now Martin Luther King Way). He converted the large home into a 25-bed hospital which he chose to name for President Theodore Roosevelt whom he admired. (President Roosevelt was an early proponent of a government-supported national public health system.) The Roosevelt Hospital was expanded to 50 beds by 1924, and renamed Berkeley General Hospital. In 1932, Dr. Herrick died, and his heirs converted the hospital into a non-profit corporation. By 1934, the hospital had 100 beds. The original Roosevelt Hospital building was demolished to accommodate additional wings and facilities which were added over time. In 1945, the hospital was again renamed Herrick Memorial Hospital, in honor of its founder. Further improvements and expansions continued through the ensuing decades.

Herrick Memorial Hospital formally affiliated with Alta Bates Hospital in 1984 and fully merged in 1988. The joint organization, spanning both sites, was briefly named Alta Bates Herrick Hospital but became Alta Bates Medical Center in 1992. The site is now known as the Herrick Campus of Alta Bates Summit Medical Center.

=== Summit Campus ===
The Summit Campus of Alta Bates Summit Medical Center was previously three separately owned and operated facilities located in the same "Pill Hill" neighborhood, generally bounded by Broadway, Telegraph Avenue and the 580 (Macarthur) freeway, immediately north of downtown Oakland: Providence Hospital (founded in 1904 by the Sisters of Providence), Peralta Hospital (founded by local Oakland doctors in the 1920s) and Samuel Merritt Hospital. Dr. Samuel Merritt (1822–1890) was a successful San Francisco physician and also the 13th mayor of Oakland, California from 1867 to 1869. In 1867, Merritt donated to the city of Oakland the wetlands now known as Lake Merritt. Merritt left plans for a hospital and nursing school to be built in his name after his death; Merritt Hospital and its nursing school (later Samuel Merritt College and now the independent Samuel Merritt University) opened in 1909. Merritt and Peralta merged in 1982; the combined Merritt merged with Providence in 1992 to form Summit Medical Center, which merged with Alta Bates in 1999.

== See also ==
- List of hospitals in California
