= Alta Bates =

American nurse anesthetist and hospital founder

Alta Alice Miner Bates
- Born: December 11, 1879; Lapeer, Michigan, United States
- Died: November 30, 1955 (aged 75); Berkeley, California, United States
- Occupation: nurse
- Known for: Alta Bates Hospital

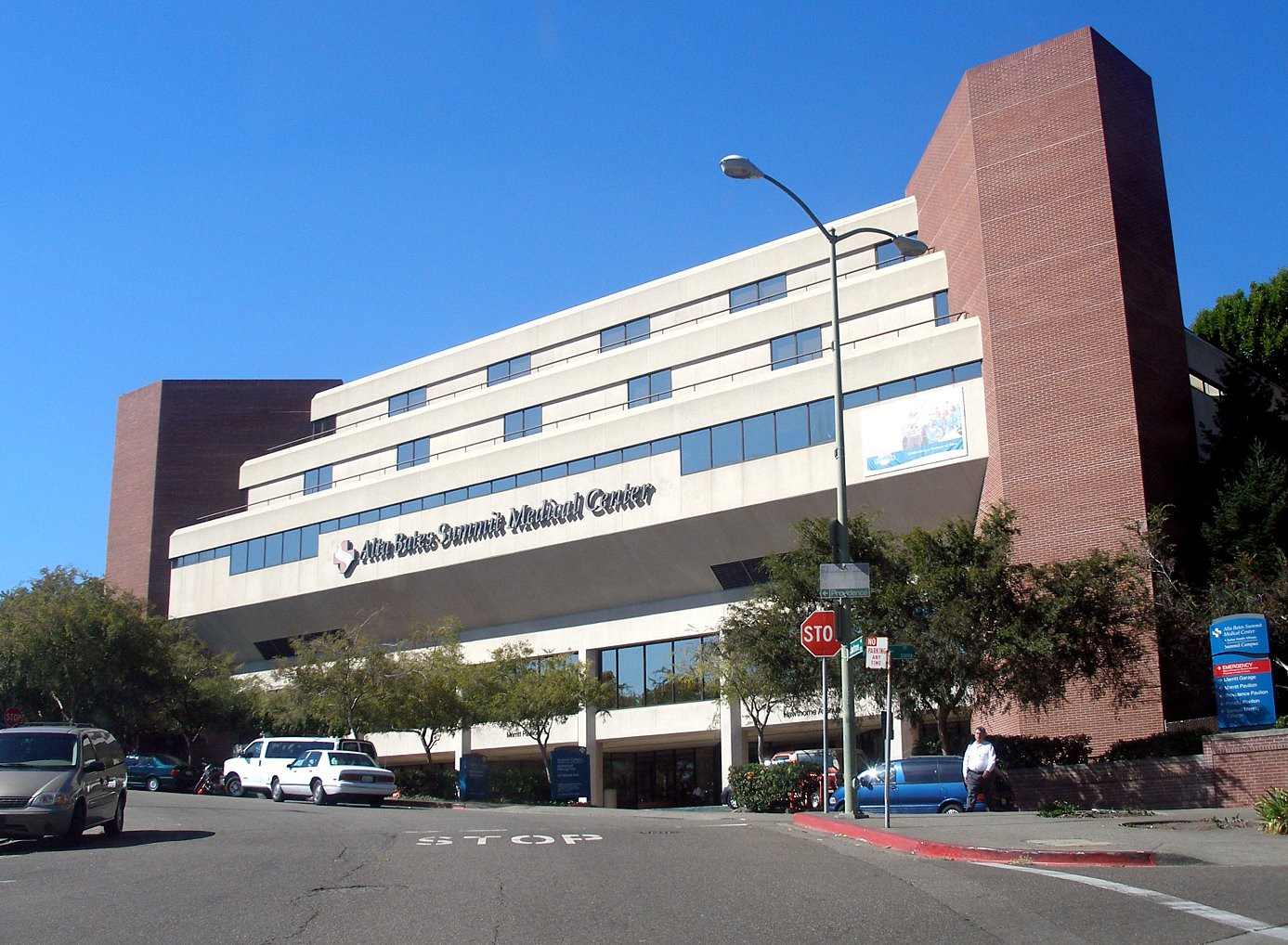
Alta Bates Summit Medical Center, Summit Campus, in Oakland.

Alta Alice Miner Bates (December 11, 1879 – November 30, 1955) was an American nurse anesthetist and the founder of the hospital now known as Alta Bates Summit Medical Center. She was the first registered nurse in Humboldt County, California, and later the first nurse anesthetist in the San Francisco Bay Area. Bates managed Alta Bates Hospital, serving as hospital director from 1905 to 1949.

== Early life and education ==
Bates was born in 1879 in Lapeer, Michigan. She and her family later moved to Northern California.

At age 23, Bates was the first nurse to graduate from the Eureka Training School for Nurses. She completed her training in 1903 at Sequoia Hospital, also in Eureka, California.

== Career ==
In 1904, Bates cared for women and their newborn babies in her parents' home on Walnut Street in Berkeley, California. At the time, there was no local hospital.

The following year, Bates founded an eight-bed sanitarium for women and children. Established with about $100, the Bates Sanitarium also served as a nursing school. Its first class of nursing students graduated in 1906.

Impressed by her work and vision, local physicians and community leaders helped Bates expand the building, securing funding to purchase two blocks on Webster Street. The new three-story institution opened in 1908. In 1928, the building was expanded into a six-story building at Regent and Webster streets. The 112-bed hospital was dedicated and renamed Alta Bates Hospital. In 1946, the hospital was renamed Alta Bates Community Hospital and established as a non-profit with a board of directors.

In addition to serving as director of the hospital and nursing school, Bates served as chief anesthetist of the hospital. Bates was a prominent early anesthetist in California, administering over 14,000 anesthetics.

After training over 330 nurses, Bates's nursing school closed in 1934.

Due to health problems, Bates retired from her role as the director of the hospital in 1949. She died in 1955 at age 75.
