= San Francisco Boys Chorus =

Boys choir

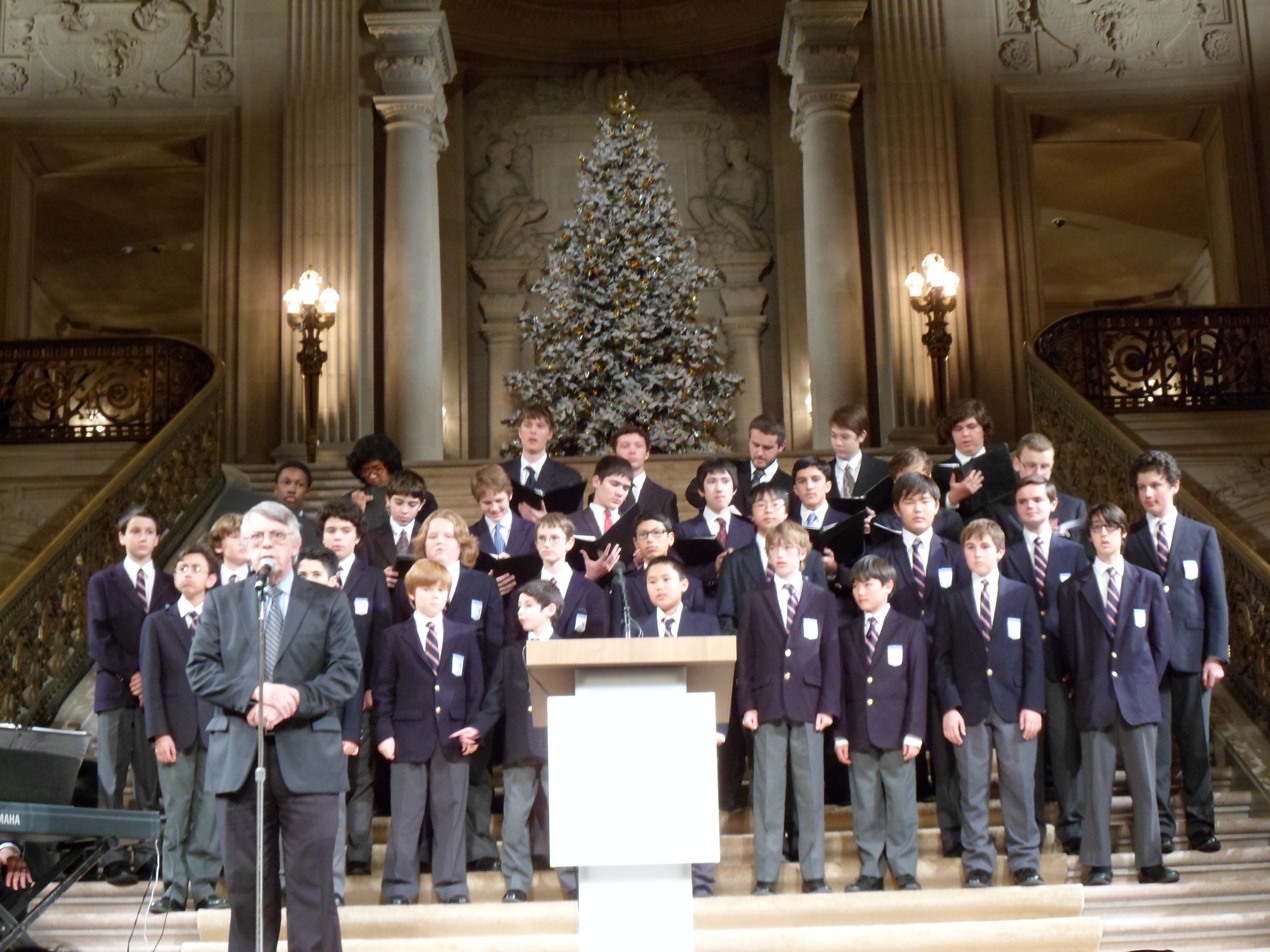

Background information
- Origin: San Francisco, California, USA
- Genres: Choral, classical, opera
- Occupations: Choir
- Instruments: 230 voices
- Years active: 1948-present
- Members: Eric Choate (artistic director); Ian Robertson (artistic director emeritus); Ildi Salgado (intermediate chorus director); Jennifer Cooper (director of music education, preparatory chorus director, apprentice chorus director); Michael Rielly (junior chorus director); Todd Jolly (bellringers director)
- Past members: Founders; Madi Bacon; Gaetano Merola
- Website: www.sfbc.org

The San Francisco Boys Chorus (SFBC) is a choir for boys consisting of 230 members based in San Francisco with additional campuses in Oakland, San Mateo, and San Rafael. It is known officially as "San Francisco's Singing Ambassadors to the World".

The group was founded in 1948 by Madi Bacon and Gaetano Merola to provide singers for the San Francisco Opera. It has been directed by Ian Robertson since 1996, prior to which it was directed by Laura Kakis Serper from 1993. Past directors also include Edwin Flath, William Ballard and Louis Magor with support from training group directors Juell Gainey (Juelle Hinman) Judy Breneman (Dodge), Sarah Keene, Donald Osborne...

== Public appearances ==
Official San Francisco Boys Chorus logo

On January 20, 2009, forty-three boys from the SFBC performed at the presidential inauguration ceremony for United States President Barack Obama at the U.S. Capitol, along with members of the San Francisco Girls Chorus (a separate organization). They sang for 20 minutes in front of an audience of millions.

Boys from the SFBC have regularly performed in productions of the San Francisco Opera and San Francisco Symphony.

Among others, the group has performed for Colin Powell, Tipper Gore, Pope John Paul II, Queen Elizabeth II, Prince Charles, Arnold Schwarzenegger, and Mikhail Gorbachev. In 1997 the group performed at the wedding of Andre Agassi and Brooke Shields in Monterey, California.

== Notable alumni ==
Alumni of the group include author Daniel Handler, better known under his pen name Lemony Snicket, actor Joshua Jackson, singer Christopheren Nomura, violinist Donald Weilerstein, cellist Paul Tobias, the late conductor Calvin Simmons, conductors Peter Rubardt, Alan Yamamoto, Joe Illick and Phillip Kelsey, and a cappella director/singer Deke Sharon.

== Discography ==
- Vince Guaraldi – Vince Guaraldi with the San Francisco Boys Chorus (1968)
- San Francisco Boys Chorus 21st Anniversary Album (1969)
- We Hear America Singing: 200 years of American Music with the Orchestra of the Marin Symphony Association (1976)
- Neil Young – Landing on Water (1986)
- San Francisco Symphony & Chorus / Herbert Blomstedt – Carl Orff: Carmina Burana (1991), winner of 1992 Grammy Award for Best Choral Performance
- We're On Our Way (2000)
- Moving On (2003)
- It's the Most Wonderful Time of the Year (2009)
- The San Francisco Boys Chorus Sings Vivaldi (2009)
- The San Francisco Boys Chorus Sings Fauré and Messager (2010)
- San Francisco Boys Chorus Sings Live (2012)
