= Ayodele Nzinga =

American playwright, director and activist

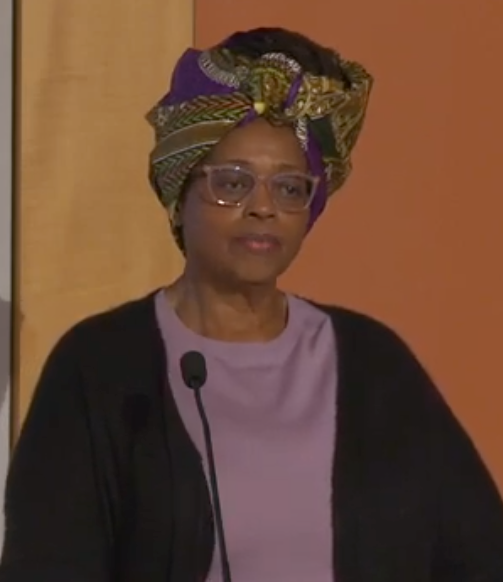
- Reading at the San Francisco Public Library in 2022
- Born: 1950s
- Education: Laney College; New College of California; California Institute of Integral Studies
- Occupations: Dramatist, poet, educator, activist

Adoyele Nzinga, also known as "WordSlanger", is a playwright, director, poet, educator and activist, and the first poet laureate of the city of Oakland, California.

== Life and career ==
Nzinga was born in the 1950s, and is unsure of her birthplace.

She attended Laney College where she started directing theater under Marvin X. She earned a MFA in Writing and Consciousness from the New College of California and a Ph.D. in Transformative Education & Change from the California Institute of Integral Studies in San Francisco.

In 1999, she founded the Lower Bottom Playaz theater troupe. They were first hosted at the Sister Thea Bowman Memorial Theater, and starting in 2023 at BAM House, an art center for African-American arts. They became the first troupe to stage August Wilson's American Century Cycle in chronological order.

In 2021, she became Oakland's first Poet Laureate for a term of two years.

== Selected works ==
- The Horse Eaters, Nomadic Press, September 2017
- SorrowLand Oracle, Nomadic Press, November 2020
- Incandescence: Poems of Power, Not a Pipe Publishing, September 2021
