= Tanya Moore (activist) =

American activist for women in science

- Occupation(s): Activist for women in mathematics and science

Tanya Moore is an activist advocating for women in mathematics and science.

== Education ==
Moore obtained a BSc in Mathematics from Spelman College and an MSE in Mathematical Sciences from Johns Hopkins University. She completed her PhD in Biostatistics at UC Berkeley in 2002.

== Career ==
Moore co-founded the Infinite Possibilities Conference in 2005. In 2011, Moore was identified as one of the five top Black women in STEM, and in 2018 was nominated for Black History Month by The Network of Minorities in Mathematical Sciences. In 2020, Moore was featured in Essence Magazine's and The Oprah Magazine. She was also recognized as “STEM Woman of the Year” by California State Assembly Member Nancy Skinner. In 2023, Moore was inducted in the Alameda County Women's Hall of Fame in the "Science, Technology and Engineering" category in recognition of her advocacy for broadening participation in STEM fields.
