= Dawn Shaughnessy =

American chemist

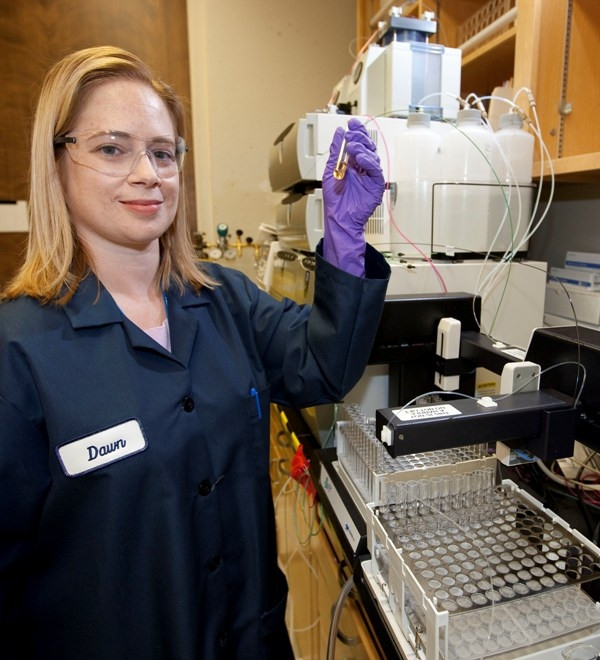
- Shaughnessy in 2013
- Born: Dawn Angela Shaughnessy
- Education: El Segundo High School
- Alma mater: University of California, Berkeley (BS, PhD)
- Known for: The Chemistry of Superheavy Elements
- Awards: American Chemical Society Fellow 2018
- Scientific career
- Fields: Isotope chemistry Nuclear chemistry
- Institutions: Lawrence Livermore National Laboratory; Lawrence Berkeley National Laboratory
- Thesis: Electron-capture delayed fission properties of neutron-deficient einsteinium nuclei (2000)
- Doctoral advisor: Darleane C. Hoffman

Dawn Angela Shaughnessy is an American radiochemist and principal investigator of the heavy element group at the Lawrence Livermore National Laboratory. She was involved in the discovery of five superheavy elements with atomic numbers 114 to 118.

== Early life and education ==
Shaughnessy wanted to be a doctor as a child but became interested in science at middle school and studied at El Segundo High School. She earned her bachelor's in chemistry at the University of California, Berkeley, in 1993. She joined Darleane C. Hoffman's group for her doctoral studies, and completed her PhD at the UC Berkeley College of Chemistry in 2000. Her thesis investigated the delayed fission of einsteinium. She won an award recognising her strength in graduate instruction.

== Research ==
Shaughnessy joined the Lawrence Berkeley National Laboratory in 2000, working under Heino Nitsche. As part of a United States Department of Energy effort to clean up nuclear materials in the environment, Shaughnessy studied how plutonium interacts with manganese-bearing minerals. She joined the Lawrence Livermore National Laboratory in 2002.

In 2012 her group received a $5,000 grant which they donated to the Livermore High School department of chemistry. She was appointed group leader of the experimental nuclear and radiochemistry group in 2013. She has been involved in campaigns to celebrate Women's History Month. In 2014 she was an editor of the book The Chemistry of Superheavy Elements.

While leading the heavy element group, Shaughnessy partnered with the Joint Institute for Nuclear Research; the team managed to identify five new superheavy elements. The elements were confirmed by the International Union of Pure and Applied Chemistry (IUPAC) in January 2016. As they were discovered at the Livermore lab, she named element 116 Livermorium. Her recent work has included nuclear forensics – being able to identify the traces of fissile material, products, and activation products after an explosion. Her team are trying to automate sample preparation and detection, allowing them to speed up their isotope analysis.

=== Awards and honors ===
Shaughnessy has won numerous awards and honors including:

- 2010 - Department of Energy Office of Science Outstanding Mentor Award
- 2010 - Gordon Battelle Prize for Scientific Discovery
- 2012 - Inducted into the Alameda County Women's Hall of Fame
- 2016 - Fast Company Most Creative
- 2018 - Elected a fellow of the American Chemical Society
