= Refractory metals =

Heat- and wear-resistant metals

H																		He
Li	Be												B	C	N	O	F	Ne
Na	Mg												Al	Si	P	S	Cl	Ar
K	Ca		Sc	Ti	V	Cr	Mn	Fe	Co	Ni	Cu	Zn	Ga	Ge	As	Se	Br	Kr
Rb	Sr		Y	Zr	Nb	Mo	Tc	Ru	Rh	Pd	Ag	Cd	In	Sn	Sb	Te	I	Xe
Cs	Ba	*	Lu	Hf	Ta	W	Re	Os	Ir	Pt	Au	Hg	Tl	Pb	Bi	Po	At	Rn
Fr	Ra	**	Lr	Rf	Db	Sg	Bh	Hs	Mt	Ds	Rg	Cn	Nh	Fl	Mc	Lv	Ts	Og
		*	La	Ce	Pr	Nd	Pm	Sm	Eu	Gd	Tb	Dy	Ho	Er	Tm	Yb
		**	Ac	Th	Pa	U	Np	Pu	Am	Cm	Bk	Cf	Es	Fm	Md	No
Refractory metals
Wider definition of refractory metals

Refractory metals are a class of metals that are extraordinarily resistant to heat and wear. The expression is mostly used in the context of materials science, metallurgy and engineering. The definitions of which elements belong to this group differ. The most common definition includes five elements: two of the fifth period (niobium and molybdenum) and three of the sixth period (tantalum, tungsten, and rhenium). They all share some properties, including a melting point above 2000 °C and high hardness at room temperature. They are chemically inert and have a relatively high density. Their high melting points make powder metallurgy the method of choice for fabricating components from these metals. Some of their applications include tools to work metals at high temperatures, wire filaments, casting molds, and chemical reaction vessels in corrosive environments. Partly due to their high melting points, refractory metals are stable against creep deformation to very high temperatures.

== Definition ==
Most definitions of the term "refractory metals" list an extraordinarily high melting point as a key requirement for inclusion. By one definition, a melting point above 4,000 °F (2,200 °C) is necessary to qualify, which includes iridium, osmium, niobium, molybdenum, tantalum, tungsten, rhenium, rhodium, ruthenium and hafnium. The five elements niobium, molybdenum, tantalum, tungsten and rhenium are included in all definitions, while the widest definition includes all elements with a melting point above 2,123 K (1,850 °C), such as titanium, vanadium, zirconium, and chromium. Technetium is not included because of its radioactivity, though it would otherwise have qualified under the widest definition.

== Properties ==
=== Physical ===
Properties of the refractory metals
Name	Niobium	Molybdenum	Tantalum	Tungsten	Rhenium
Period	5	5	6	6	6
Group	5	6	5	6	7
Melting point K (Note: Consensus values taken from melting points of the elements with multiple references there.)	2750	2896	3290	3695	3459
Boiling point K (Note: Consensus values taken from boiling points of the elements with multiple references there. Tungsten has a particularly wide band of discrepancy, with two primary sources reporting 5555 °C.)	5017	4912	5731	6203	5869
Melting point °C	2477	2623	3017	3422	3186
Boiling point °C	4744	4639	5458	5930	5596
Density g·cm^{−3} (Note: Consensus values taken from densities of the elements with multiple references there.)	8.57	10.28	16.69	19.25	21.02
Young's modulus GPa	105	329	186	411	463
Vickers hardness MPa	1320	1530	873	3430	2450

Refractory metals have high melting points, with tungsten and rhenium the highest of all elements, and the others' melting points exceeded only by osmium and iridium, and the sublimation of carbon. These high melting points define most of their applications. All the metals are body-centered cubic except rhenium which is hexagonal close-packed. The physical properties of the refractory elements vary significantly because they are members of different groups of the periodic table. The hardness, high melting and boiling points, and high enthalpies of atomization of these metals arise from the partial occupation of the outer d subshell, allowing the d electrons to participate in metallic bonding. This gives stiff, highly stable bonds to neighboring atoms and a body-centered cubic crystal structure that resists deformation. Moving to the right in the periodic table, more d electrons increase this effect, but as the d subshell fills they are pulled by the higher nuclear charge into the atom's inert core, reducing their ability to delocalize to form bonds with neighbors. These opposing effects result in groups 5 through 7 exhibiting the most refractory properties.

Creep resistance is a key property of the refractory metals. In metals, the starting of creep correlates with the melting point of the material; the creep in aluminium alloys starts at 200 °C, while for refractory metals temperatures above 1500 °C are necessary. This resistance against deformation at high temperatures makes the refractory metals suitable against strong forces at high temperature, for example in jet engines, or tools used during forging.

=== Chemical ===
The refractory metals show a wide variety of chemical properties because they are members of three distinct groups in the periodic table. They are easily oxidized, but this reaction is slowed down in the bulk metal by the formation of stable oxide layers on the surface (passivation). Especially the oxide of rhenium is more volatile than the metal, and therefore at high temperature the stabilization against the attack of oxygen is lost, because the oxide layer evaporates. They all are relatively stable against acids.

== Applications ==
Refractory metals, and alloys made from them, are used in lighting, tools, lubricants, nuclear reaction control rods, as catalysts, and for their chemical or electrical properties. Because of their high melting points, refractory metal components are never fabricated by casting. The process of powder metallurgy is used: powders of the pure metal are compacted, heated using electric current, and further fabricated by cold working with annealing steps. Refractory metals and their alloys can be worked into wire, ingots, rebars, sheets, or foil.

=== Molybdenum alloys ===
Molybdenum-based alloys are widely used, because they are cheaper than superior tungsten alloys. The most widely used alloy of molybdenum is the Titanium-Zirconium-Molybdenum alloy TZM, composed of 0.5% titanium and 0.08% of zirconium (with molybdenum being the rest). The alloy exhibits a higher creep resistance and strength at high temperatures, making service temperatures of above 1060 °C possible for the material. The high resistivity of Mo-30W, an alloy of 70% molybdenum and 30% tungsten, against the attack of molten zinc makes it the ideal material for casting zinc. It is also used to construct valves for molten zinc.

Molybdenum is used in mercury-wetted reed relays, because molybdenum does not form amalgams and is therefore resistant to corrosion by liquid mercury.

Molybdenum is the most commonly used of the refractory metals. Its most important use is as a strengthening alloy of steel. Structural tubing and piping often contains molybdenum, as do many stainless steels. Its strength at high temperatures, resistance to wear, and low coefficient of friction are all properties which make it invaluable as an alloying compound. Its excellent anti-friction properties lead to its incorporation in greases and oils where reliability and performance are critical. Automotive constant-velocity joints use grease containing molybdenum. The compound sticks readily to metal and forms a very hard, friction-resistant coating. Most of the world's molybdenum ore can be found in China, the USA, Chile, and Canada.

=== Tungsten and its alloys ===
Tungsten was discovered in 1781 by Swedish chemist Carl Wilhelm Scheele. Tungsten has the highest melting point of all metals, at 3,410 °C (6,170 °F).

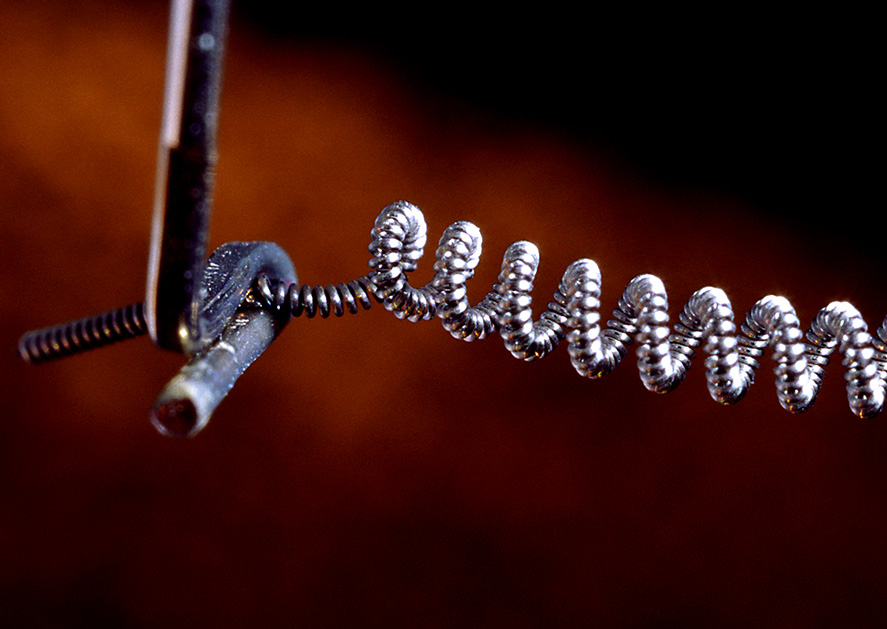
Filament of a 200 watt incandescent lightbulb highly magnified

Up to 22% Rhenium is alloyed with tungsten to improve its high-temperature strength and corrosion resistance. Thorium as an alloying compound is used when electric arcs have to be established: ignition is easier and the arc burns more stably than without the addition of thorium. For powder metallurgy applications, binders have to be used for the sintering process. For the production of tungsten heavy alloys, binder mixtures of nickel and iron or nickel and copper are widely used. The tungsten content of the alloy is normally above 90%. The diffusion of the binder elements into the tungsten grains is low even at the sintering temperatures and therefore the interior of the grains are pure tungsten.

Tungsten and its alloys are often used in applications where high temperatures are present but a high strength is still necessary and the high density is not troublesome. Tungsten-wire filaments provide the vast majority of household incandescent lighting, but are also common in industrial lighting as electrodes in arc lamps. Lamps get more efficient in the conversion of electric energy to light with higher temperatures, so a high melting point is essential for the application as filament in incandescent light. Gas tungsten arc welding (GTAW, also known as tungsten inert gas (TIG) welding) equipment uses a permanent, non-melting electrode. The high melting point and the wear resistance against the electric arc makes tungsten a suitable material for the electrode.

Tungsten's high density and strength are also key properties for its use in weapon projectiles, for example as an alternative to depleted uranium for tank gun rounds. Its high melting point makes tungsten a good material for applications like rocket nozzles, for example in the UGM-27 Polaris. Some of the applications of tungsten are not related to its refractory properties but simply to its density. For example, it is used in balance weights for planes and helicopters or for heads of golf clubs. In these applications, similar dense materials like the more expensive osmium can also be used.

The most common use for tungsten is as the compound tungsten carbide in drill bits, machining and cutting tools. The largest reserves of tungsten are in China, with deposits in Korea, Bolivia, Australia, and other countries.

It also finds itself serving as a lubricant, antioxidant, in nozzles and bushings, as a protective coating, and in many other ways. Tungsten can be found in printing inks, x-ray screens, in the processing of petroleum products, and flame proofing of textiles.

=== Niobium alloys ===
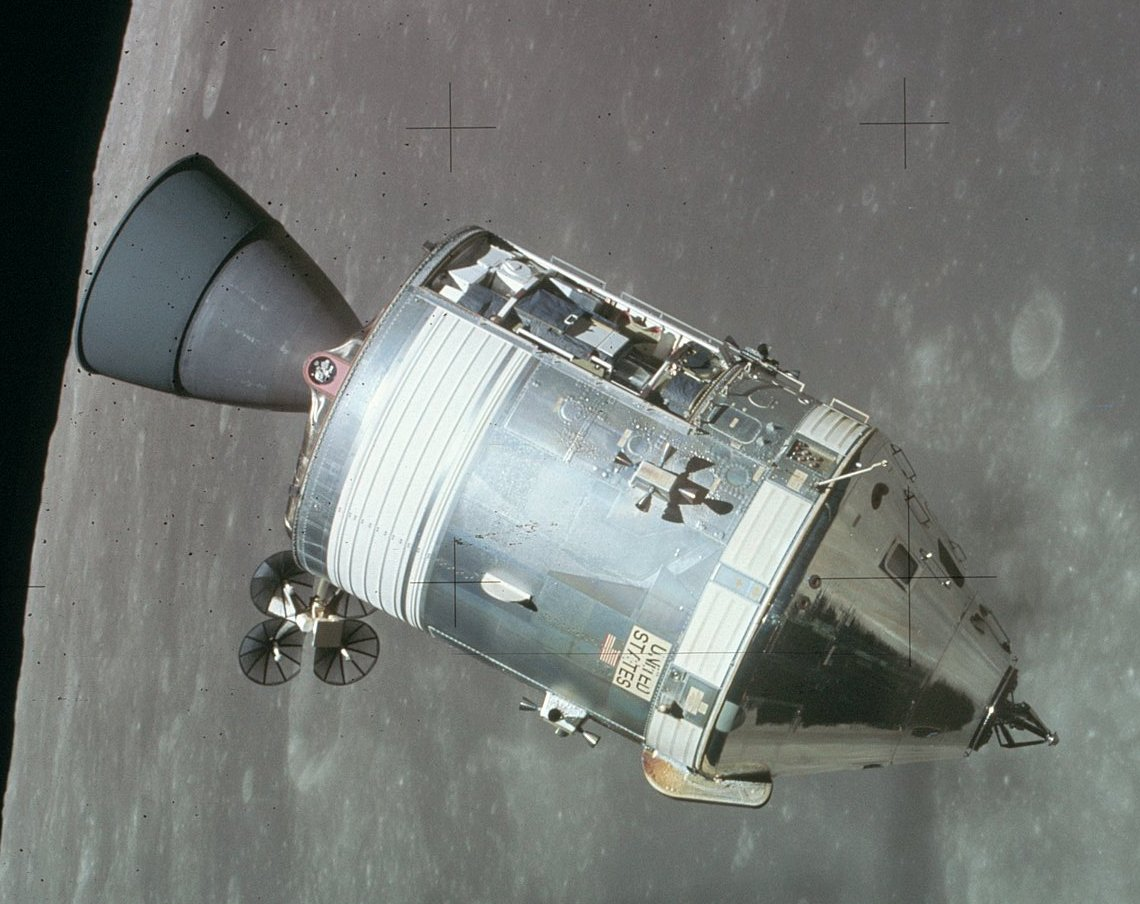
Apollo CSM with the dark rocket nozzle made from niobium-titanium alloy

Niobium is nearly always found together with tantalum, and was named after Niobe, the daughter of the mythical Greek king Tantalus for whom tantalum was named. Niobium has many uses, some of which it shares with other refractory metals. It is unique in that it can be worked through annealing to achieve a wide range of strength and ductility, and is the least dense of the refractory metals. It can also be found in electrolytic capacitors and in the most practical superconducting alloys. Niobium can be found in aircraft gas turbines, vacuum tubes, and nuclear reactors.

An alloy used for liquid rocket thruster nozzles, such as in the main engine of the Apollo Lunar Modules, is C103, which consists of 89% niobium, 10% hafnium and 1% titanium. Another niobium alloy was used for the nozzle of the Apollo Service Module. As niobium is oxidized at temperatures above 400 °C, a protective coating is necessary for these applications to prevent the alloy from becoming brittle.

=== Tantalum and its alloys ===
Tantalum is one of the most corrosion-resistant substances available. Many important uses have been found for tantalum owing to this property, particularly in the medical and surgical fields, and also in harsh acidic environments. It is also used to make superior electrolytic capacitors. Tantalum films provide the second most capacitance per volume of any substance after Aerogel, and allow miniaturization of electronic components and circuitry. Many cellular phones and computers contain tantalum capacitors.

=== Rhenium alloys ===
Rhenium is the most recently discovered refractory metal. It is found in low concentrations with many other metals, in the ores of other refractory metals, platinum or copper ores. It is useful as an alloy to other refractory metals, where it adds ductility and tensile strength. Rhenium alloys are used in electronic components, gyroscopes and nuclear reactors. Rhenium finds its most important use as a catalyst. It is used as a catalyst in reactions such as alkylation, dealkylation, hydrogenation and oxidation. However, its rarity makes it the most expensive of the refractory metals.

== Advantages and shortfalls ==
The strength and high-temperature stability of refractory metals make them suitable for hot metalworking applications and for vacuum furnace technology. Many special applications exploit these properties: for example, tungsten lamp filaments operate at temperatures up to 3073 K, and molybdenum furnace windings withstand 2273 K.

However, poor low-temperature fabricability and extreme oxidability at high temperatures are shortcomings of most refractory metals. Interactions with the environment can significantly influence their high-temperature creep strength. Application of these metals requires a protective atmosphere or coating.

The refractory metal alloys of molybdenum, niobium, tantalum, and tungsten have been applied to space nuclear power systems. These systems were designed to operate at temperatures from 1350 K to approximately 1900 K. An environment must not interact with the material in question. Liquid alkali metals as the heat-transfer fluids are used as well as the ultra-high vacuum.

The high-temperature creep strain of alloys must be limited for them to be used. The creep strain should not exceed 1–2%. An additional complication in studying creep behavior of the refractory metals is interactions with environment, which can significantly influence the creep behavior.

== See also ==
- Refractory – heat resistance of nonmetallic materials
