= Boiling points of the elements (data page) =

This is a list of the various reported boiling points for the elements.

== Boiling points, master list format ==
Element	Reference	Kelvin	Celsius	Fahrenheit
1 H hydrogen (H_{2})	WebEl	20.28 K	−252.87 °C	−423.17 °F
1 H hydrogen (H_{2})	CRC		−252.879 °C	
1 H hydrogen (H_{2})	Lange		−252.88 °C	
1 H hydrogen (H_{2})	Zhang et al.	21.15 K	−252 °C	
2 He helium	WebEl	4.22 K	−268.93 °C	−452.07 °F
2 He helium	CRC		−268.928 °C	
2 He helium	Lange		−268.935 °C	
2 He helium	Zhang et al.	4.15 K	−269 °C	
3 Li lithium	WebEl	1615 K	1342 °C	2448 °F
3 Li lithium	CRC		1342 °C	
3 Li lithium	Lange		1330 °C	
3 Li lithium	Zhang et al.	1603 K	1330 °C	
4 Be beryllium	WebEl	2742 K	2469 °C	4476 °F
4 Be beryllium	CRC	3243 K		
4 Be beryllium	Lange		2467 °C	
4 Be beryllium	Zhang et al.	3243 K	2970 °C	5378 °F
5 B boron	WebEl	4200 K	3927 °C	7101 °F
5 B boron	CRC		4000 °C	
5 B boron	Lange		3864 °C	
5 B boron	Zhang et al.	4203 K	3930 °C	
6 C carbon (graphite)	WebEl	? (4300 K)	? (4027 °C)	? (7281 °F)
6 C carbon (graphite)	CRC		3825 °C (subl.)	
6 C carbon (graphite)	Lange		3915–4020 °C (subl.)	
6 C carbon (graphite)	Zhang et al.	5103 K	4830 °C	
6 C carbon (diamond)	WebEl	? (4300 K)	? (4027 °C)	? (7281 °F)
6 C carbon (diamond)	Lange		3930 °C	
7 N nitrogen (N_{2})	WebEl	77.36 K	−195.79 °C	−320.42 °F
7 N nitrogen (N_{2})	CRC		−195.795 °C	
7 N nitrogen (N_{2})	Lange		−195.79 °C	
7 N nitrogen (N_{2})	Zhang et al.	77.15 K	−196 °C	
8 O oxygen (O_{2})	WebEl	90.2 K	−182.9 °C	−297.2 °F
8 O oxygen (O_{2})	CRC		−182.962 °C	
8 O oxygen (O_{2})	Lange		−182.96 °C	
8 O oxygen (O_{2})	Zhang et al.	90.15 K	−183 °C	
9 F fluorine (F_{2})	WebEl	85.03 K	−188.12 °C	−306.62 °F
9 F fluorine (F_{2})	CRC		−188.11 °C	
9 F fluorine (F_{2})	Lange		−188.13 °C	
9 F fluorine (F_{2})	Zhang et al.	85.15 K	−188 °C	
10 Ne neon	WebEl	27.07 K	−246.08 °C	−410.94 °F
10 Ne neon	CRC		−246.046 °C	
10 Ne neon	Lange		−246.05 °C	
10 Ne neon	Zhang et al.	27.15 K	−246 °C	
11 Na sodium	WebEl	1156 K	883 °C	1621 °F
11 Na sodium	CRC		882.940 °C	
11 Na sodium	Lange		881.4 °C	
11 Na sodium	Zhang et al.	1163 K	890 °C	
12 Mg magnesium	WebEl	1363 K	1090 °C	1994 °F
12 Mg magnesium	CRC		1090 °C	
12 Mg magnesium	Lange		1100 °C	
12 Mg magnesium	Zhang et al.	1383 K	1110 °C	
13 Al aluminium	WebEl	2792 K	2519 °C	4566 °F
13 Al aluminium	CRC		2519 °C	
13 Al aluminium	Lange		2518 °C	
13 Al aluminium	Zhang et al.	2743 K	2470 °C	4478 °F
14 Si silicon	WebEl	3173 K	2900 °C	5252 °F
14 Si silicon	CRC		3265 °C	
14 Si silicon	Lange		3265 °C	
14 Si silicon	Zhang et al.	3533 K	3260 °C	
15 P phosphorus (white)	WebEl	550 K	277 °C	531 °F
15 P phosphorus (white)	CRC		280.5 °C	
15 P phosphorus (white)	Lange		280.3 °C	
15 P phosphorus (white)	Zhang et al.	553.2 K	280 °C	
15 P phosphorus (red)	CRC		431 °C (subl.)	
15 P phosphorus (red)	Lange		416 °C (subl.)	
16 S sulfur (orthorhombic, alpha)	WebEl	? (717.87 K)	? (444.72 °C)	? (832.5 °F)
16 S sulfur (orthorhombic, alpha)	CRC		444.60 °C	
16 S sulfur (orthorhombic, alpha)	Lange		444.6 °C	
16 S sulfur (orthorhombic, alpha)	Zhang et al.	718.2 K	445 °C	
16 S sulfur (monoclinic, beta)	WebEl	? (717.87 K)	? (444.72 °C)	? (832.5 °F)
16 S sulfur (monoclinic, beta)	CRC		444.60 °C	
16 S sulfur (monoclinic, beta)	Lange		444.6 °C	
16 S sulfur (gamma)	WebEl	? (717.87 K)	? (444.72 °C)	? (832.5 °F)
16 S sulfur (gamma)	Lange		444.72 °C	
17 Cl chlorine (Cl_{2})	WebEl	239.11 K	−34.04 °C	−29.27 °F
17 Cl chlorine (Cl_{2})	CRC		−34.04 °C	
17 Cl chlorine (Cl_{2})	Lange		−34.04 °C	
17 Cl chlorine (Cl_{2})	Zhang et al.	238.5 K	−34.7 °C	
18 Ar argon	WebEl	87.3 K	−185.8 °C	−302.4 °F
18 Ar argon	CRC		−185.848 °C	
18 Ar argon	Lange		−185.87 °C	
18 Ar argon	Zhang et al.	87.15 K	−186 °C	
19 K potassium	WebEl	1032 K	759 °C	1398 °F
19 K potassium	CRC		759 °C	
19 K potassium	Lange		759 °C	
19 K potassium	Zhang et al.	1047 K	774 °C	1425 °F
20 Ca calcium	WebEl	1757 K	1484 °C	2703 °F
20 Ca calcium	CRC		1484 °C	
20 Ca calcium	Lange		1484 °C	
20 Ca calcium	Zhang et al.	1760 K	1487 °C	
21 Sc scandium	WebEl	3103 K	2830 °C	5126 °F
21 Sc scandium	CRC		2836 °C	
21 Sc scandium	Lange		2836 °C	
21 Sc scandium	Zhang et al.	3003 K	2730 °C	
22 Ti titanium (hexagonal)	WebEl	3560 K	3287 °C	5949 °F
22 Ti titanium (hexagonal)	CRC		3287 °C	
22 Ti titanium (hexagonal)	Lange		3287 °C	
22 Ti titanium (hexagonal)	Zhang et al.	3533 K	3260 °C	
23 V vanadium	WebEl	3680 K	3407 °C	6165 °F
23 V vanadium	CRC		3407 °C	
23 V vanadium	Lange		3421 °C	
23 V vanadium	Zhang et al.	3680 K	3407 °C	
24 Cr chromium	Zhang et al.	2755 K	2482 °C	4499 °F
24 Cr chromium	WebEl	2944 K	2671 °C	4840 °F
24 Cr chromium	CRC		2671 °C	
24 Cr chromium	Lange		2679 °C	
24 Cr chromium	Zhang et al.	2755 K	2482 °C	
25 Mn manganese	WebEl	2334 K	2061 °C	3742 °F
25 Mn manganese	CRC		2061 °C	
25 Mn manganese	Lange		2095 °C	
25 Mn manganese	Zhang et al.	2373 K	2100 °C	
26 Fe iron	WebEl	3134 K	2861 °C	5182 °F
26 Fe iron	CRC		2861 °C	
26 Fe iron	Lange		2861 °C	
26 Fe iron	Zhang et al.	3273 K	3000 °C	
27 Co cobalt	WebEl	3200 K	2927 °C	5301 °F
27 Co cobalt	CRC		2927 °C	
27 Co cobalt	Lange		2927 °C	
27 Co cobalt	Zhang et al.	3173 K	2900 °C	
28 Ni nickel	WebEl	3186 K	2913 °C	5275 °F
28 Ni nickel	CRC		2913 °C	
28 Ni nickel	Lange		2884 °C	
28 Ni nickel	Zhang et al.	3003 K	2730 °C	4946 °F
29 Cu copper	WebEl	3200 K	2927 °C	5301 °F
29 Cu copper	CRC		2562 °C	
29 Cu copper	Lange		2561.5 °C	
29 Cu copper	Zhang et al.	2868 K	2595 °C	
30 Zn zinc	WebEl	1180 K	907 °C	1665 °F
30 Zn zinc	CRC		907 °C	
30 Zn zinc	Lange		907 °C	
30 Zn zinc	Zhang et al.	1180 K	907 °C	
31 Ga gallium	WebEl	2477 K	2204 °C	3999 °F
31 Ga gallium	CRC		2204 °C	
31 Ga gallium	Lange		2203 °C	
31 Ga gallium	Zhang et al.	2673 K	2400 °C	4352 °F
32 Ge germanium	WebEl	3093 K	2820 °C	5108 °F
32 Ge germanium	CRC		2833 °C	
32 Ge germanium	Lange		2830 °C	
32 Ge germanium	Zhang et al.	3103 K	2830 °C	
33 As arsenic (gray)	WebEl	887 K	614 °C	1137 °F
33 As arsenic (gray)	CRC		603 °C (subl.)	
33 As arsenic (gray)	Lange		615 °C (subl.)	
33 As arsenic (gray)	Zhang et al.	886.2 K	613 °C	
34 Se selenium (hexagonal, gray)	WebEl	958 K	685 °C	1265 °F
34 Se selenium (hexagonal, gray)	CRC		685 °C	
34 Se selenium (hexagonal, gray)	Lange		685 °C	
34 Se selenium (hexagonal, gray)	Zhang et al.	958.2 K	685 °C	
35 Br bromine (Br_{2})	WebEl	332 K	59 °C	138 °F
35 Br bromine (Br_{2})	CRC		58.8 °C	
35 Br bromine (Br_{2})	Lange		58.8 °C	
35 Br bromine (Br_{2})	Zhang et al.	331.7 K	58.5 °C	
36 Kr krypton	WebEl	119.93 K	−153.22 °C	−243.8 °F
36 Kr krypton	CRC		−153.415 °C	
36 Kr krypton	Lange		−153.22 °C	
36 Kr krypton	Zhang et al.	121.2 K	−152 °C	
37 Rb rubidium	WebEl	961 K	688 °C	1270 °F
37 Rb rubidium	CRC		688 °C	
37 Rb rubidium	Lange		691 °C	
37 Rb rubidium	Zhang et al.	961.2 K	688 °C	
38 Sr strontium	WebEl	1655 K	1382 °C	2520 °F
38 Sr strontium	CRC		1377 °C	
38 Sr strontium	Lange		1366 °C	
38 Sr strontium	Zhang et al.	1653 K	1380 °C	
39 Y yttrium	WebEl	3609 K	3336 °C	6037 °F
39 Y yttrium	CRC		3345 °C	
39 Y yttrium	Lange		3345 °C	
39 Y yttrium	Zhang et al.	3203 K	2930 °C	5306 °F
40 Zr zirconium	WebEl	4682 K	4409 °C	7968 °F
40 Zr zirconium	CRC		4409 °C	
40 Zr zirconium	Lange		3577 °C	
40 Zr zirconium	Zhang et al.	4650 K	4377 °C	7911 °F
41 Nb niobium	WebEl	5017 K	4744 °C	8571 °F
41 Nb niobium	CRC		4744 °C	
41 Nb niobium	Lange		4860 °C	
41 Nb niobium	Zhang et al.	5017 K	4744 °C	
42 Mo molybdenum	WebEl	4912 K	4639 °C	8382 °F
42 Mo molybdenum	CRC		4639 °C	
42 Mo molybdenum	Lange		4825 °C	
42 Mo molybdenum	Zhang et al.	4885 K	4612 °C	
43 Tc technetium (Tc-98 ?)	WebEl	4538 K	4265 °C	7709 °F
43 Tc technetium (Tc-98 ?)	CRC		4265 °C	
43 Tc technetium (Tc-98 ?)	Lange		4265 °C (Tc-98)	
43 Tc technetium (Tc-98 ?)	Schwochau	4900 K (est.)		
44 Ru ruthenium	WebEl	4423 K	4150 °C	7502 °F
44 Ru ruthenium	CRC		4150 °C	
44 Ru ruthenium	Lange		4150 °C	
44 Ru ruthenium	Zhang et al.	4423 K	4150 °C	
45 Rh rhodium	WebEl	3968 K	3695 °C	6683 °F
45 Rh rhodium	CRC		3695 °C	
45 Rh rhodium	Lange		3727 °C	
45 Rh rhodium	Zhang et al.	4000 K	3727 °C	
46 Pd palladium	WebEl	3236 K	2963 °C	5365 °F
46 Pd palladium	CRC		2963 °C	
46 Pd palladium	Lange		3167 °C	
46 Pd palladium	Zhang et al.	3233 K	2960 °C	
47 Ag silver	WebEl	2435 K	2162 °C	3924 °F
47 Ag silver	CRC		2162 °C	
47 Ag silver	Lange		2164 °C	
47 Ag silver	Zhang et al.	2483 K	2210 °C	4010 °F
48 Cd cadmium	WebEl	1040 K	767 °C	1413 °F
48 Cd cadmium	CRC		767 °C	
48 Cd cadmium	Lange		765 °C	
48 Cd cadmium	Zhang et al.	1038 K	765 °C	
49 In indium	WebEl	2345 K	2072 °C	3762 °F
49 In indium	CRC		2072 °C	
49 In indium	Lange		2072 °C	
49 In indium	Zhang et al.	2273 K	2000 °C	
50 Sn tin (white)	WebEl	2875 K	2602 °C	4716 °F
50 Sn tin (white)	CRC		2602 °C	
50 Sn tin (white)	Lange		2602 °C	
50 Sn tin (white)	Zhang et al.	2893 K	2620 °C	
51 Sb antimony	WebEl	1860 K	1587 °C	2889 °F
51 Sb antimony	CRC		1587 °C	
51 Sb antimony	Lange		1587 °C	
51 Sb antimony	Zhang et al.	1908 K	1635 °C	
52 Te tellurium	WebEl	1261 K	988 °C	1810 °F
52 Te tellurium	CRC		988 °C	
52 Te tellurium	Lange		989.9 °C	
52 Te tellurium	Zhang et al.	1263 K	990 °C	
53 I iodine (I_{2})	WebEl	457.4 K	184.3 °C	363.7 °F
53 I iodine (I_{2})	CRC		184.4 °C	
53 I iodine (I_{2})	Lange		185.24 °C	
53 I iodine (I_{2})	Zhang et al.	457.2 K	184 °C	
54 Xe xenon	WebEl	165.1 K	−108 °C	−162 °F
54 Xe xenon	CRC		−108.099 °C	
54 Xe xenon	Lange		−108.04 °C	
54 Xe xenon	Zhang et al.	165.2 K	−108 °C	
55 Cs caesium	WebEl	944 K	671 °C	1240 °F
55 Cs caesium	CRC		671 °C	
55 Cs caesium	Lange		668.2 °C	
55 Cs caesium	Zhang et al.	963.2 K	690 °C	
56 Ba barium	WebEl	2143 K	1870 °C	3398 °F
56 Ba barium	CRC		1845 °C	
56 Ba barium	Lange		1845 °C	
56 Ba barium	Zhang et al.	1910 K	1637 °C	
57 La lanthanum	WebEl	3743 K	3470 °C	6278 °F
57 La lanthanum	CRC		3464 °C	
57 La lanthanum	Lange		3464 °C	
57 La lanthanum	Zhang et al.	3743 K	3470 °C	
58 Ce cerium	WebEl	3633 K	3360 °C	6080 °F
58 Ce cerium	CRC		3443 °C	
58 Ce cerium	Lange		3440 °C	
58 Ce cerium	Zhang et al.	3743 K	3470 °C	
59 Pr praseodymium	WebEl	3563 K	3290 °C	5954 °F
59 Pr praseodymium	CRC		3520 °C	
59 Pr praseodymium	Lange		3520 °C	
59 Pr praseodymium	Zhang et al.	3403 K	3130 °C	
60 Nd neodymium	WebEl	3373 K	3100 °C	5612 °F
60 Nd neodymium	CRC		3074 °C	
60 Nd neodymium	Lange		3074 °C	
60 Nd neodymium	Zhang et al.	3303 K	3030 °C	
61 Pm promethium (Pm-147 ?)	WebEl	3273 K	3000 °C	5432 °F
61 Pm promethium (Pm-147 ?)	CRC		3000 °C	
61 Pm promethium (Pm-147 ?)	Lange		3000 °C (est.) (Pm-147)	
62 Sm samarium	WebEl	2076 K	1803 °C	3277 °F
62 Sm samarium	CRC		1794 °C	
62 Sm samarium	Lange		1794 °C	
62 Sm samarium	Zhang et al.	2173 K	1900 °C	3452 °F
63 Eu europium	WebEl	1800 K	1527 °C	2781 °F
63 Eu europium	CRC		1529 °C	
63 Eu europium	Lange		1527 °C	
63 Eu europium	Zhang et al.	1713 K	1440 °C	
64 Gd gadolinium	WebEl	3523 K	3250 °C	5882 °F
64 Gd gadolinium	CRC		3273 °C	
64 Gd gadolinium	Lange		3273 °C	
64 Gd gadolinium	Zhang et al.	3273 K	3000 °C	5432 °F
65 Tb terbium	WebEl	3503 K	3230 °C	5846 °F
65 Tb terbium	CRC		3230 °C	
65 Tb terbium	Lange		3230 °C	
65 Tb terbium	Zhang et al.	3396 K	3123 °C	5653 °F
66 Dy dysprosium	WebEl	2840 K	2567 °C	4653 °F
66 Dy dysprosium	CRC		2567 °C	
66 Dy dysprosium	Lange		2567 °C	
66 Dy dysprosium	Zhang et al.	2873 K	2600 °C	
67 Ho holmium	WebEl	2993 K	2720 °C	4928 °F
67 Ho holmium	CRC		2700 °C	
67 Ho holmium	Lange		2720 °C	
67 Ho holmium	Zhang et al.	2873 K	2600 °C	4712 °F
68 Er erbium	WebEl	3141 K	2868 °C	5194 °F
68 Er erbium	CRC		2868 °C	
68 Er erbium	Lange		2868 °C	
68 Er erbium	Zhang et al.	3173 K	2900 °C	
69 Tm thulium	WebEl	2223 K	1950 °C	3542 °F
69 Tm thulium	CRC		1950 °C	
69 Tm thulium	Lange		1950 °C	
69 Tm thulium	Zhang et al.	2223 K	1950 °C	3542 °F
70 Yb ytterbium	WebEl	1469 K	1196 °C	2185 °F
70 Yb ytterbium	CRC		1196 °C	
70 Yb ytterbium	Lange		1196 °C	
70 Yb ytterbium	Zhang et al.	1703K	1430 °C	2606 °F
71 Lu lutetium	WebEl	3675 K	3402 °C	6156 °F
71 Lu lutetium	CRC		3402 °C	
71 Lu lutetium	Lange		3402 °C	
71 Lu lutetium	Zhang et al.	3603 K	3330 °C	
72 Hf hafnium	WebEl	4876 K	4603 °C	8317 °F
72 Hf hafnium	CRC		4603 °C	
72 Hf hafnium	Lange		4450 °C	
72 Hf hafnium	Zhang et al.	4876 K	4603 °C	
73 Ta tantalum	WebEl	5731 K	5458 °C	9856 °F
73 Ta tantalum	CRC		5458 °C	
73 Ta tantalum	Lange		5429 °C	
73 Ta tantalum	Zhang et al.	5693 K	5420 °C	
74 W tungsten	WebEl	5828 K	5555 °C	10031 °F
74 W tungsten	CRC		5555 °C	
74 W tungsten	Lange		5900 °C	
74 W tungsten	Zhang et al.	6203 K	5930 °C	10706 °F
75 Re rhenium	WebEl	5869 K	5596 °C	10105 °F
75 Re rhenium	CRC		5596 °C	
75 Re rhenium	Lange		5678 °C	
75 Re rhenium	Zhang et al.	5903 K	5630 °C	
76 Os osmium	WebEl	5285 K	5012 °C	9054 °F
76 Os osmium	CRC		5012 °C	
76 Os osmium	Lange		5225 °C	
76 Os osmium	Zhang et al.	5273 K	5000 °C	
77 Ir iridium	WebEl	4701 K	4428 °C	8002 °F
77 Ir iridium	CRC		4428 °C	
77 Ir iridium	Lange		2550 °C (circa)	
77 Ir iridium	Zhang et al.	4403 K	4130 °C	7466 °F
78 Pt platinum	WebEl	4098 K	3825 °C	6917 °F
78 Pt platinum	CRC		3825 °C	
78 Pt platinum	Lange		3824 °C	
78 Pt platinum	Zhang et al.	4100 K	3827 °C	
79 Au gold	WebEl	3129 K	2856 °C	5173 °F
79 Au gold	CRC		2856 °C	
79 Au gold	Lange		2856 °C	
79 Au gold	Zhang et al.	3243 K	2970 °C	5378 °F
80 Hg mercury	WebEl	629.88 K	356.73 °C	674.11 °F
80 Hg mercury	CRC		356.73 °C	
80 Hg mercury	Lange		356.7 °C	
80 Hg mercury	Zhang et al.	630.2 K	357 °C	
81 Tl thallium	WebEl	1746 K	1473 °C	2683 °F
81 Tl thallium	CRC		1473 °C	
81 Tl thallium	Lange		1457 °C	
81 Tl thallium	Zhang et al.	1733 K	1460 °C	
82 Pb lead	WebEl	2022 K	1749 °C	3180 °F
82 Pb lead	CRC		1749 °C	
82 Pb lead	Lange		1749 °C	
82 Pb lead	Zhang et al.	2017 K	1744 °C	
83 Bi bismuth	WebEl	1837 K	1564 °C	2847 °F
83 Bi bismuth	CRC		1564 °C	
83 Bi bismuth	Lange		1564 °C	
83 Bi bismuth	Zhang et al.	1833 K	1560 °C	
84 Po polonium (alpha)	WebEl	1235 K	962 °C	1764 °F
84 Po polonium (alpha)	CRC		962 °C	
84 Po polonium (alpha)	Lange		962 °C	
85 At astatine (At_{2})	Otozai et al.	503±3 K		
86 Rn radon	WebEl	211.3 K	−61.7 °C	−79.1 °F
86 Rn radon	CRC		−61.7 °C	
86 Rn radon	Lange		−62 °C	
87 Fr francium	Lavrukhina et al.		620 °C	
88 Ra radium	WebEl	2010 K	1737 °C	3159 °F
88 Ra radium	Lange		1737 °C	
89 Ac actinium (Ac-227 ?)	WebEl	3573 K	3300 °C	5972 °F
89 Ac actinium (Ac-227 ?)	CRC		3198 °C	
89 Ac actinium (Ac-227 ?)	Lange		3200 °C (circa) (Ac-227)	
90 Th thorium	WebEl	5093 K	4820 °C	8708 °F
90 Th thorium	CRC		4788 °C	
90 Th thorium	Lange		4788 °C	
91 Pa protactinium				
92 U uranium	WebEl	4200 K	3927 °C	7101 °F
92 U uranium	CRC		4131 °C	
92 U uranium	Lange		4131 °C	
93 Np neptunium	WebEl	4273 K	4000 °C	7232 °F
93 Np neptunium	Lange		above 3900 °C	
94 Pu plutonium	WebEl	3503 K	3230 °C	5846 °F
94 Pu plutonium	CRC		3228 °C	
94 Pu plutonium	Lange		3230 °C	
95 Am americium	WebEl	2880 K	2607 °C	4725 °F
95 Am americium	CRC		2011 °C	
95 Am americium	Lange		2011 °C	
96 Cm curium (Cm-244 ?)	WebEl	3383 K	3110 °C	5630 °F
96 Cm curium (Cm-244 ?)	CRC		3100 °C (circa)	
96 Cm curium (Cm-244 ?)	Lange		3110 °C (circa) (Cm-244)	

== Periodic table format ==
Boiling point of the elements in the periodic table
Group →	1	2		3	4	5	6	7	8	9	10	11	12	13	14	15	16	17	18
↓ Period
1	H_{2} 20.271 K (−252.879 °C)																		He4.222 K (−268.928 °C)
2	Li1603 K (1330 °C)	Be2742 K (2469 °C)												B 4200 K (3927 °C)	C 3915 K (subl.) (3642 °C)	N_{2} 77.355 K (−195.795 °C)	O_{2} 90.188 K (−182.962 °C)	F_{2} 85.03 K (−188.11 °C)	Ne27.104 K (−246.046 °C)
3	Na1156.090 K (882.940 °C)	Mg1363 K (1091 °C)												Al2743 K (2470 °C)	Si3538 K (3265 °C)	P 553.7 K (280.5 °C)	S 717.8 K (444.6 °C)	Cl_{2}239.11 K (−34.04 °C)	Ar87.302 K (−185.848 °C)
4	K 1032 K (759 °C)	Ca1757 K (1484 °C)		Sc3109 K (2836 °C)	Ti3560 K (3287 °C)	V 3680 K (3407 °C)	Cr2945.15 K (2672.0 °C)	Mn2334 K (2061 °C)	Fe3134 K (2861 °C)	Co3200 K (2927 °C)	Ni3003 K (2730 °C)	Cu2835 K (2562 °C)	Zn1180 K (907 °C)	Ga2673 K (2400 °C)	Ge3106 K (2833 °C)	As887 K (subl.) (615 °C)	Se958 K (685 °C)	Br_{2}332.0 K (58.8 °C)	Kr119.735 K (−153.415 °C)
5	Rb961 K (688 °C)	Sr1650 K (1377 °C)		Y 3203 K (2930 °C)	Zr4650 K (4377 °C)	Nb5017 K (4744 °C)	Mo4912 K (4639 °C)	Tc4538 K (4265 °C)	Ru4423 K (4150 °C)	Rh3968 K (3695 °C)	Pd3236 K (2963 °C)	Ag2483 K (2210 °C)	Cd1040 K (767 °C)	In2345 K (2072 °C)	Sn2875 K (2602 °C)	Sb1908 K (1635 °C)	Te1261 K (988 °C)	I_{2} 457.4 K (184.3 °C)	Xe165.051 K (−108.099 °C)
6	Cs944 K (671 °C)	Ba2118 K (1845 °C)	1 asterisk	Lu3675 K (3402 °C)	Hf4876 K (4603 °C)	Ta5731 K (5458 °C)	W 6203 K (5930 °C)	Re5900.15 K (5627.0 °C)	Os5285 K (5012 °C)	Ir4403 K (4130 °C)	Pt4098 K (3825 °C)	Au3243 K (2970 °C)	Hg629.88 K (356.73 °C)	Tl1746 K (1473 °C)	Pb2022 K (1749 °C)	Bi1837 K (1564 °C)	Po1235 K (962 °C)	At_{2}503±3 K (230±3 °C)	Rn211.5 K (−61.7 °C)
7	Fr950 K (677 °C)	Ra2010 K (1737 °C)	1 asterisk	Lr	Rf5800 K (5500 °C)	Db	Sg	Bh	Hs	Mt	Ds	Rg	Cn340±10 K (67±10 °C)	Nh1430 K (1130 °C)	Fl380 K (107 °C)	Mc~1400 K (~1100 °C)	Lv1035–1135 K (762–862 °C)	Ts883 K (610 °C)	Og450±10 K (177±10 °C)
1 asterisk				La3737 K (3464 °C)	Ce3716 K (3443 °C)	Pr3403 K (3130 °C)	Nd3347 K (3074 °C)	Pm3273 K (3000 °C)	Sm2173 K (1900 °C)	Eu1802 K (1529 °C)	Gd3546 K (3273 °C)	Tb3396 K (3123 °C)	Dy2840 K (2567 °C)	Ho2873 K (2600 °C)	Er3141 K (2868 °C)	Tm2223 K (1950 °C)	Yb1469 K (1196 °C)
1 asterisk				Ac3471 K (3198 °C)	Th5061 K (4788 °C)	Pa4300? K (4027 °C)	U 4404 K (4131 °C)	Np4175.15 K (3902.0 °C)	Pu3508.15 K (3235.0 °C)	Am2880 K (2607 °C)	Cm3383 K (3110 °C)	Bk2900 K (2627 °C)	Cf1743 K (1470 °C)	Es1269 K (996 °C)	Fm	Md	No
Legend
Values are in kelvin K and degrees Celsius °C, rounded
For the equivalent in degrees Fahrenheit °F, see: Boiling points of the elements (data page)
Some values are predictions
Primordial From decay Synthetic Border shows natural occurrence of the element: s-block / g-block / f-block / d-block / p-block

== Notes ==
- Unless noted, all values refer to the normal boiling point at standard pressure (101.325 kPa).

== See also ==
- Melting points of the elements (data page)
- Densities of the elements (data page)
