= Melting points of the elements (data page) =

== Table ==
In the following table, the use row is the value recommended for use in other Wikipedia pages in order to maintain consistency across content. For a sortable list, see List of chemical elements.

| Reference | Kelvin | Celsius | Fahrenheit | Comments |
1 H hydrogen (H_{2})
| use | 13.99 K | −259.16 °C | −434.49 °F | |
| WEL | 14.01 K | −259.14 °C | −434.45 °F | |
| CRC | | −259.16 °C | | |
| LNG | | −259.35 °C | | |
2 He helium
| use | 0 K | −273.15 °C | −459.67 °F | hcp crystal melting to He-II superfluid at 25.00 atm |
| use | 1.463 K | −271.687 °C | −457.037 °F | triple point hcp−bcc−He-II at 26.036 atm |
| use | 1.762 K | −271.388 °C | −456.498 °F | triple point hcp−bcc−He-II at 29.725 atm |
| use | 1.772 K | −271.378 °C | −456.480 °F | triple point hcp−He-II−He-I at 30.016 atm |
| WEL | 0.95 K | −272.2 °C | −458 °F | |
| LNG | | −272.15 °C | | (at 25 atm) |
| § Hoffer et al. | 0 K | −273.15 °C | −459.67 °F | hcp crystal melting to He-II superfluid at 25.00 atm |
| § Hoffer et al. | 1.463 K | −271.687 °C | −457.037 °F | triple point hcp−bcc−He-II at 26.036 atm |
| § Hoffer et al. | 1.762 K | −271.388 °C | −456.498 °F | triple point hcp−bcc−He-II at 29.725 atm |
| § Hoffer et al. | 1.772 K | −271.378 °C | −456.480 °F | triple point hcp−He-II−He-I at 30.016 atm |
3 Li lithium
| use | 453.65 K | 180.50 °C | 356.90 °F | |
| WEL | 453.69 K | 180.54 °C | 356.97 °F | |
| CRC | | 180.50 °C | | |
| LNG | | 180.54 °C | | |
4 Be beryllium
| use | 1560 K | 1287 °C | 2349 °F | |
| WEL | 1560 K | 1287 °C | 2349 °F | |
| CRC | | 1287 °C | | |
| LNG | | 1287 °C | | |
5 B boron
| use | 2349 K | 2076 °C | 3769 °F | |
| WEL | 2349 K | 2076 °C | 3769 °F | |
| CRC | | 2075 °C | | |
| LNG | | 2076 °C | | |
6 C carbon (graphite)
| use | | | | |
| WEL | ? (3800 K) | ? (3527 °C) | ? (6381 °F) | |
| CRC | | tp 4489 °C | | (at 10.3 MPa) |
| LNG | | subl. (3915–4020) °C | | |
6 C carbon (diamond)
| use | | | | |
| WEL | ? (3800 K) | ? (3527 °C) | ? (6381 °F) | |
| CRC | | 4440 °C | | (at 12.4 GPa) |
| LNG | | 3500 °C | | (at 63.5 atm) |
7 N nitrogen (N_{2})
| use | 63.15 K | −210.00 °C | −346.00 °F | |
| WEL | 63.05 K | −210.1 °C | −346.18 °F | |
| CRC | | −210.00 °C | | |
| LNG | | −210.01 °C | | |
8 O oxygen (O_{2})
| use | 54.36 K | −218.79 °C | −361.82 °F | |
| WEL | 54.8 K | −218.3 °C | −360.9 °F | |
| CRC | | −218.79 °C | | |
| LNG | | −218.4 °C | | |
9 F fluorine (F_{2})
| use | 53.48 K | −219.67 °C | −363.41 °F | |
| WEL | 53.53 K | −219.62 °C | −363.32 °F | |
| CRC | | tp −219.67 °C | | |
| LNG | | −219.61 °C | | |
10 Ne neon
| use | 24.56 K | −248.59 °C | −415.46 °F | |
| WEL | 24.56 K | −248.59 °C | −415.46 °F | |
| CRC | | −248.59 °C | | |
| LNG | | −248.67 °C | | |
11 Na sodium
| use | 370.944 K | 97.794 °C | 207.9 °F | |
| WEL | 370.87 K | 97.72 °C | 207.9 °F | |
| CRC | | 97.794 °C | | |
| LNG | | 97.82 °C | | |
12 Mg magnesium
| use | 923 K | 650 °C | 1202 °F | |
| WEL | 923 K | 650 °C | 1202 °F | |
| CRC | | 650 °C | | |
| LNG | | 651 °C | | |
13 Al aluminium
| use | 933.47 K | 660.32 °C | 1220.58 °F | |
| WEL | 933.47 K | 660.32 °C | 1220.58 °F | |
| CRC | | 660.32 °C | | |
| LNG | | 660.323 °C | | |
freezing point 933.473 K (660.323 °C) fixed point on ITS-90
14 Si silicon
| use | 1687 K | 1414 °C | 2577 °F | |
| WEL | 1687 K | 1414 °C | 2577 °F | |
| CRC | | 1414 °C | | |
| LNG | | 1412 °C | | |
15 P phosphorus (white)
| use | 317.30 K | 44.15 °C | 111.47 °F | |
| WEL | 317.3 K | 44.2 °C | 111.6 °F | |
| CRC | | 44.15 °C | | |
| LNG | | 44.15 °C | | |
15 P phosphorus (red)
| use | 870 K | 597 °C | 1107 °F | |
| CRC | | tp 590 °C | | |
| LNG | | 597 °C | | |
15 P phosphorus (black)
| use | 883 K | 610 °C | 1130 °F | |
| CRC | | 610 °C | | |
| LNG | | | | |
16 S sulfur (orthorhombic, alpha)
| use | 368.4 K | 95.3 °C | 203.5 °F | (trans. to beta) |
| CRC | | 95.3 °C | | (trans. to mono) |
| LNG | | 94.5 °C | | (trans. to beta) |
16 S sulfur (monoclinic, beta, trans. slowly to alpha)
| use | 388.36 K | 115.21 °C | 239.38 °F | |
| WEL | 388.36 K | 115.21 °C | 239.38 °F | |
| CRC | | 119.6 °C | | |
| LNG | | 115.21 °C | | |
16 S sulfur (gamma)
| use | 380.0 K | 106.8 °C | 224.2 °F | |
| LNG | | 106.8 °C | | |
17 Cl chlorine (Cl_{2})
| use | 171.6 K | −101.5 °C | −150.7 °F | |
| WEL | 171.6 K | −101.5 °C | −150.7 °F | |
| CRC | | −101.5 °C | | |
| LNG | | −101.5 °C | | |
18 Ar argon
| use | 83.81 K | −189.34 °C | −308.81 °F | |
| WEL | 83.8 K | −189.3 °C | −308.7 °F | |
| CRC | | −189.34 °C | | |
| LNG | | −189.38 °C | | |
19 K potassium
| use | 336.7 K | 63.5 °C | 146.3 °F | |
| WEL | 336.53 K | 63.38 °C | 146.08 °F | |
| CRC | | 63.5 °C | | |
| LNG | | 63.38 °C | | |
20 Ca calcium
| use | 1115 K | 842 °C | 1548 °F | |
| WEL | 1115 K | 842 °C | 1548 °F | |
| CRC | | 842 °C | | |
| LNG | | 842 °C | | |
21 Sc scandium
| use | 1814 K | 1541 °C | 2806 °F | |
| WEL | 1814 K | 1541 °C | 2806 °F | |
| CRC | | 1541 °C | | |
| LNG | | 1541 °C | | |
22 Ti titanium (hexagonal)
| use | 1941 K | 1668 °C | 3034 °F | |
| WEL | 1941 K | 1668 °C | 3034 °F | |
| CRC | | 1668 °C | | |
| LNG | | 1668 °C | | |
23 V vanadium
| use | 2183 K | 1910 °C | 3470 °F | |
| WEL | 2183 K | 1910 °C | 3470 °F | |
| CRC | | 1910 °C | | |
| LNG | | 1917 °C | | |
24 Cr chromium
| use | 2180 K | 1907 °C | 3465 °F | |
| WEL | 2180 K | 1907 °C | 3465 °F | |
| CRC | | 1907 °C | | |
| LNG | | 1907 °C | | |
25 Mn manganese
| use | 1519 K | 1246 °C | 2275 °F | |
| WEL | 1519 K | 1246 °C | 2275 °F | |
| CRC | | 1246 °C | | |
| LNG | | 1244 °C | | (face-centered tetragonal) |
26 Fe iron
| use | 1811 K | 1538 °C | 2800 °F | |
| WEL | 1811 K | 1538 °C | 2800 °F | |
| CRC | | 1538 °C | | |
| LNG | | 1535 °C | | |
27 Co cobalt
| use | 1768 K | 1495 °C | 2723 °F | |
| WEL | 1768 K | 1495 °C | 2723 °F | |
| CRC | | 1495 °C | | |
| LNG | | 1494 °C | | |
28 Ni nickel
| use | 1728 K | 1455 °C | 2651 °F | |
| WEL | 1728 K | 1455 °C | 2651 °F | |
| CRC | | 1455 °C | | |
| LNG | | 1453 °C | | |
29 Cu copper
| use | 1357.77 K | 1084.62 °C | 1984.32 °F | |
| WEL | 1357.77 K | 1084.62 °C | 1984.32 °F | |
| CRC | | 1084.62 °C | | |
| LNG | | 1084.62 °C | | |
freezing point 1357.77 K (1084.62 °C) fixed point on ITS-90
30 Zn zinc
| use | 692.68 K | 419.53 °C | 787.15 °F | |
| WEL | 692.68 K | 419.53 °C | 787.15 °F | |
| CRC | | 419.53 °C | | |
| LNG | | 419.527 °C | | |
freezing point 692.677 K (419.527 °C) fixed point on ITS-90
31 Ga gallium
| use | 302.9146 K | 29.7646 °C | 85.5763 °F | |
| WEL | 302.91 K | 29.76 °C | 85.57 °F | |
| CRC | | tp 29.771 °C | | |
| LNG | | 29.7646 °C | | |
melting point 302.9146 K (29.7646 °C) fixed point on ITS-90
32 Ge germanium
| use | 1211.40 K | 938.25 °C | 1720.85 °F | |
| WEL | 1211.4 K | 938.3 °C | 1720.9 °F | |
| CRC | | 938.25 °C | | |
| LNG | | 937.3 °C | | |
33 As arsenic
| use | 1090 K | 817 °C | 1503 °F | |
| WEL | 1090 K | 817 °C | 1503 °F | |
| CRC | | tp 817 °C | | (at 3.70 MPa) |
| LNG | | 817 °C | | |
34 Se selenium (hexagonal, gray)
| use | 494 K | 221 °C | 430 °F | |
| WEL | 494 K | 221 °C | 430 °F | |
| CRC | | 220.5 °C | | |
| LNG | | 217 °C | | |
34 Se selenium (vitreous)
| use | 453 K | 180 °C | 356 °F | (trans. to gray) |
| CRC | | 180 °C | | (trans. to gray) |
35 Br bromine (Br_{2})
| use | 265.8 K | −7.3 °C | 19 °F | |
| WEL | 265.8 K | −7.3 °C | 19 °F | |
| CRC | | −7.2 °C | | |
| LNG | | −7.25 °C | | |
36 Kr krypton
| use | 115.78 K | −157.37 °C | −251.27 °F | |
| WEL | 115.79 K | −157.37 °C | −251.25 °F | |
| CRC | | tp −157.38 °C | | (at 73.2 kPa) |
| LNG | | −157.36 °C | | |
37 Rb rubidium
| use | 312.45 K | 39.30 °C | 102.74 °F | |
| WEL | 312.46 K | 39.31 °C | 102.76 °F | |
| CRC | | 39.30 °C | | |
| LNG | | 39.31 °C | | |
38 Sr strontium
| use | 1050 K | 777 °C | 1431 °F | |
| WEL | 1050 K | 777 °C | 1431 °F | |
| CRC | | 777 °C | | |
| LNG | | 757 °C | | |
39 Y yttrium
| use | 1799 K | 1526 °C | 2779 °F | |
| WEL | 1799 K | 1526 °C | 2779 °F | |
| CRC | | 1522 °C | | |
| LNG | | 1522 °C | | |
40 Zr zirconium
| use | 2128 K | 1855 °C | 3371 °F | |
| WEL | 2128 K | 1855 °C | 3371 °F | |
| CRC | | 1855 °C | | |
| LNG | | 1852 °C | | |
41 Nb niobium
| use | 2750 K | 2477 °C | 4491 °F | |
| WEL | 2750 K | 2477 °C | 4491 °F | |
| CRC | | 2477 °C | | |
| LNG | | 2468 °C | | |
42 Mo molybdenum
| use | 2896 K | 2623 °C | 4753 °F | |
| WEL | 2896 K | 2623 °C | 4753 °F | |
| CRC | | 2623 °C | | |
| LNG | | 2622 °C | | |
43 Tc technetium (Tc-98 ?)
| use | 2430 K | 2157 °C | 3915 °F | |
| WEL | 2430 K | 2157 °C | 3915 °F | |
| CRC | | 2157 °C | | |
| LNG | | 2157 °C | | (Tc-98) |
44 Ru ruthenium
| use | 2607 K | 2334 °C | 4233 °F | |
| WEL | 2607 K | 2334 °C | 4233 °F | |
| CRC | | 2334 °C | | |
| LNG | | 2334 °C | | |
45 Rh rhodium
| use | 2237 K | 1964 °C | 3567 °F | |
| WEL | 2237 K | 1964 °C | 3567 °F | |
| CRC | | 1964 °C | | |
| LNG | | 1963 °C | | |
46 Pd palladium
| use | 1828.05 K | 1554.9 °C | 2830.82 °F | |
| WEL | 1828.05 K | 1554.9 °C | 2830.82 °F | |
| CRC | | 1554.9 °C | | |
| LNG | | 1555 °C | | |
47 Ag silver
| use | 1234.93 K | 961.78 °C | 1763.2 °F | |
| WEL | 1234.93 K | 961.78 °C | 1763.2 °F | |
| CRC | | 961.78 °C | | |
| LNG | | 961.78 °C | | |
freezing point 1234.93 K (961.78 °C) fixed point on ITS-90
48 Cd cadmium
| use | 594.22 K | 321.07 °C | 609.93 °F | |
| WEL | 594.22 K | 321.07 °C | 609.93 °F | |
| CRC | | 321.07 °C | | |
| LNG | | 321 °C | | |
49 In indium
| use | 429.75 K | 156.60 °C | 313.88 °F | |
| WEL | 429.75 K | 156.6 °C | 313.88 °F | |
| CRC | | 156.60 °C | | |
| LNG | | 156.60 °C | | |
freezing point 429.7485 K (156.5985 °C) fixed point on ITS-90
50 Sn tin (white)
| use | 505.08 K | 231.93 °C | 449.47 °F | |
| WEL | 505.08 K | 231.93 °C | 449.47 °F | |
| CRC | | 231.93 °C | | |
| LNG | | 231.928 °C | | |
freezing point 505.078 K (231.928 °C) fixed point on ITS-90
51 Sb antimony
| use | 903.78 K | 630.63 °C | 1167.13 °F | |
| WEL | 903.78 K | 630.63 °C | 1167.13 °F | |
| CRC | | 630.63 °C | | |
| LNG | | 630.7 °C | | |
52 Te tellurium
| use | 722.66 K | 449.51 °C | 841.12 °F | |
| WEL | 722.66 K | 449.51 °C | 841.12 °F | |
| CRC | | 449.51 °C | | |
| LNG | | 449.8 °C | | |
53 I iodine (I_{2})
| use | 386.85 K | 113.7 °C | 236.66 °F | |
| WEL | 386.85 K | 113.7 °C | 236.66 °F | |
| CRC | | 113.7 °C | | |
| LNG | | 113.60 °C | | |
54 Xe xenon
| use | 161.40 K | −111.75 °C | −169.15 °F | |
| WEL | 161.4 K | −111.7 °C | −169.1 °F | |
| CRC | | tp −111.795 °C | | (at 81.6 kPa) |
| LNG | | −111.8 °C | | |
55 Cs caesium
| use | 301.7 K | 28.5 °C | 83.3 °F | |
| WEL | 301.59 K | 28.44 °C | 83.19 °F | |
| CRC | | 28.5 °C | | |
| LNG | | 28.44 °C | | |
56 Ba barium
| use | 1000 K | 727 °C | 1341 °F | |
| WEL | 1000 K | 727 °C | 1341 °F | |
| CRC | | 727 °C | | |
| LNG | | 726.9 °C | | |
57 La lanthanum
| use | 1193 K | 920 °C | 1688 °F | |
| WEL | 1193 K | 920 °C | 1688 °F | |
| CRC | | 918 °C | | |
| LNG | | 920 °C | | |
58 Ce cerium
| use | 1068 K | 795 °C | 1463 °F | |
| WEL | 1068 K | 795 °C | 1463 °F | |
| CRC | | 798 °C | | |
| LNG | | 795 °C | | |
59 Pr praseodymium
| use | 1208 K | 935 °C | 1715 °F | |
| WEL | 1208 K | 935 °C | 1715 °F | |
| CRC | | 931 °C | | |
| LNG | | 935 °C | | |
60 Nd neodymium
| use | 1297 K | 1024 °C | 1875 °F | |
| WEL | 1297 K | 1024 °C | 1875 °F | |
| CRC | | 1021 °C | | |
| LNG | | 1024 °C | | |
61 Pm promethium (Pm-147 ?)
| use | 1315 K | 1042 °C | 1908 °F | |
| WEL | 1373 K | 1100 °C | 2012 °F | |
| CRC | | 1042 °C | | |
| LNG | | 1080 °C | | (Pm-147) |
62 Sm samarium
| use | 1345 K | 1072 °C | 1962 °F | |
| WEL | 1345 K | 1072 °C | 1962 °F | |
| CRC | | 1074 °C | | |
| LNG | | 1074 °C | | |
63 Eu europium
| use | 1099 K | 826 °C | 1519 °F | |
| WEL | 1099 K | 826 °C | 1519 °F | |
| CRC | | 822 °C | | |
| LNG | | 822 °C | | |
64 Gd gadolinium
| use | 1585 K | 1312 °C | 2394 °F | |
| WEL | 1585 K | 1312 °C | 2394 °F | |
| CRC | | 1313 °C | | |
| LNG | | 1312 °C | | |
65 Tb terbium
| use | 1629 K | 1356 °C | 2473 °F | |
| WEL | 1629 K | 1356 °C | 2473 °F | |
| CRC | | 1356 °C | | |
| LNG | | 1356 °C | | |
66 Dy dysprosium
| use | 1680 K | 1407 °C | 2565 °F | |
| WEL | 1680 K | 1407 °C | 2565 °F | |
| CRC | | 1412 °C | | |
| LNG | | 1412 °C | | |
67 Ho holmium
| use | 1734 K | 1461 °C | 2662 °F | |
| WEL | 1734 K | 1461 °C | 2662 °F | |
| CRC | | 1474 °C | | |
| LNG | | 1474 °C | | |
68 Er erbium
| use | 1802 K | 1529 °C | 2784 °F | The Gmelin rare earths handbook lists 1522 °C and 1550 °C as two melting points given in the literature, the most recent reference [Handbook on the chemistry and physics of rare earths, vol.12 (1989)] is given with 1529 °C.; The World Book encyclopedia from 2002 lists 1529 °C. |
| WEL | 1770 K | 1497 °C | 2727 °F | The Gmelin rare earths handbook lists 1522 °C and 1550 °C as two melting points given in the literature, the most recent reference [Handbook on the chemistry and physics of rare earths, vol.12 (1989)] is given with 1529 °C.; The World Book encyclopedia from 2002 lists 1529 °C. |
| CRC | | 1529 °C | | The Gmelin rare earths handbook lists 1522 °C and 1550 °C as two melting points given in the literature, the most recent reference [Handbook on the chemistry and physics of rare earths, vol.12 (1989)] is given with 1529 °C.; The World Book encyclopedia from 2002 lists 1529 °C. |
| LNG | | 1529 °C | | The Gmelin rare earths handbook lists 1522 °C and 1550 °C as two melting points given in the literature, the most recent reference [Handbook on the chemistry and physics of rare earths, vol.12 (1989)] is given with 1529 °C.; The World Book encyclopedia from 2002 lists 1529 °C. |
69 Tm thulium
| use | 1818 K | 1545 °C | 2813 °F | |
| WEL | 1818 K | 1545 °C | 2813 °F | |
| CRC | | 1545 °C | | |
| LNG | | 1545 °C | | |
70 Yb ytterbium
| use | 1097 K | 824 °C | 1515 °F | |
| WEL | 1097 K | 824 °C | 1515 °F | |
| CRC | | 819 °C | | |
| LNG | | 819 °C | | |
71 Lu lutetium
| use | 1925 K | 1652 °C | 3006 °F | |
| WEL | 1925 K | 1652 °C | 3006 °F | |
| CRC | | 1663 °C | | |
| LNG | | 1663 °C | | |
72 Hf hafnium
| use | 2506 K | 2233 °C | 4051 °F | |
| WEL | 2506 K | 2233 °C | 4051 °F | |
| CRC | | 2233 °C | | |
| LNG | | 2227 °C | | |
73 Ta tantalum
| use | 3290 K | 3017 °C | 5463 °F | |
| WEL | 3290 K | 3017 °C | 5463 °F | |
| CRC | | 3017 °C | | |
| LNG | | 2996 °C | | |
74 W tungsten
| use | 3695 K | 3422 °C | 6192 °F | |
| WEL | 3695 K | 3422 °C | 6192 °F | |
| CRC | | 3422 °C | | |
| LNG | | 3387 °C | | |
75 Re rhenium
| use | 3459 K | 3186 °C | 5767 °F | |
| WEL | 3459 K | 3186 °C | 5767 °F | |
| CRC | | 3186 °C | | |
| LNG | | 3180 °C | | |
76 Os osmium
| use | 3306 K | 3033 °C | 5491 °F | |
| WEL | 3306 K | 3033 °C | 5491 °F | |
| CRC | | 3033 °C | | |
| LNG | | 3045 °C | | |
77 Ir iridium
| use | 2719 K | 2446 °C | 4435 °F | |
| WEL | 2739 K | 2466 °C | 4471 °F | |
| CRC | | 2446 °C | | |
| LNG | | 2447 °C | | |
78 Pt platinum
| use | 2041.4 K | 1768.3 °C | 3214.9 °F | |
| WEL | 2041.4 K | 1768.3 °C | 3214.9 °F | |
| CRC | | 1768.4 °C | | |
| LNG | | 1769 °C | | |
79 Au gold
| use | 1337.33 K | 1064.18 °C | 1947.52 °F | |
| WEL | 1337.33 K | 1064.18 °C | 1947.52 °F | |
| CRC | | 1064.18 °C | | |
| LNG | | 1064.18 °C | | |
freezing point 1337.33 K (1064.18 °C) fixed point on ITS-90
80 Hg mercury
| use | 234.32 K | −38.83 °C | −37.89 °F | |
| WEL | 234.32 K | −38.83 °C | −37.89 °F | |
| CRC | | tp −38.837 °C | | |
| LNG | | −38.83 °C | | |
81 Tl thallium
| use | 577 K | 304 °C | 579 °F | |
| WEL | 577 K | 304 °C | 579 °F | |
| CRC | | 304 °C | | |
| LNG | | 303.5 °C | | |
82 Pb lead
| use | 600.61 K | 327.46 °C | 621.43 °F | |
| WEL | 600.61 K | 327.46 °C | 621.43 °F | |
| CRC | | 327.46 °C | | |
| LNG | | 327.43 °C | | |
83 Bi bismuth
| use | 544.7 K | 271.5 °C | 520.7 °F | |
| WEL | 544.4 K | 271.3 °C | 520.3 °F | |
| CRC | | 271.40 °C | | |
| LNG | | 271.5 °C | | |
84 Po polonium
| use | 527 K | 254 °C | 489 °F | |
| WEL | 527 K | 254 °C | 489 °F | |
| CRC | | 254 °C | | |
| LNG | | 254 °C | | |
85 At astatine
| WEL | 575 K | 302 °C | 576 °F | |
| CRC | | 302 °C | | |
| LNG | | 302 °C | | |
86 Rn radon
| use | 202 K | −71 °C | −96 °F | |
| WEL | 202 K | −71 °C | −96 °F | |
| CRC | | −71 °C | | |
| LNG | | −71 °C | | |
87 Fr francium
| use | 281.0 K | 8.0 °C | 46.4 °F | |
| Lavrukhina et al. | | 8.0 °C | | |
| CRC | | 27 °C | | |
88 Ra radium
| use | 973 K | 700 °C | 1292 °F | |
| WEL | 973 K | 700 °C | 1292 °F | |
| CRC | | 700 °C | | |
| LNG | | 700.1 °C | | |
89 Ac actinium (Ac-227 ?)
| use | circa 1323 K | circa 1050 °C | circa 1922 °F | |
| WEL | 1323 K | 1050 °C | 1922 °F | |
| CRC | | 1051 °C | | |
| LNG | | 1050(50) °C | | (Ac-227) |
90 Th thorium
| use | 2115 K | 1842 °C | 3348 °F | |
| WEL | 2115 K | 1842 °C | 3348 °F | |
| CRC | | 1750 °C | | |
| LNG | | 1750 °C | | |
91 Pa protactinium
| use | 1841 K | 1568 °C | 2854 °F | |
| WEL | 1841 K | 1568 °C | 2854 °F | |
| CRC | | 1572 °C | | |
92 U uranium
| use | 1405.3 K | 1132.2 °C | 2070 °F | |
| WEL | 1405.3 K | 1132.2 °C | 2070 °F | |
| CRC | | 1135 °C | | |
| LNG | | 1135 °C | | |
93 Np neptunium
| use | 917 K | 644 °C | 1191 °F | |
| WEL | 910 K | 637 °C | 1179 °F | |
| CRC | | 644 °C | | |
| LNG | | 644 °C | | |
94 Pu plutonium
| use | 912.5 K | 639.4 °C | 1182.9 °F | |
| WEL | 912.5 K | 639.4 °C | 1182.9 °F | |
| CRC | | 640 °C | | |
| LNG | | 639.5 °C | | |
95 Am americium
| use | 1449 K | 1176 °C | 2149 °F | |
| WEL | 1449 K | 1176 °C | 2149 °F | |
| CRC | | 1176 °C | | |
| LNG | | 1176 °C | | |
96 Cm curium (Cm-244 ?)
| use | 1613 K | 1340 °C | 2444 °F | |
| WEL | 1613 K | 1340 °C | 2444 °F | |
| CRC | | 1345 °C | | |
| LNG | | 1340 °C | | (Cm-244) |
97 Bk berkelium (alpha)
| use | 1323 K | 1050 °C | 1922 °F | |
| CRC | | 1050 °C | | |
| LNG | | 1050 °C | | |
97 Bk berkelium (beta)
| use | 1259 K | 986 °C | 1807 °F | |
| WEL | 1259 K | 986 °C | 1807 °F | |
| CRC | | 986 °C | | |
| LNG | | 986 °C | | |
98 Cf californium (Cf-252 ?)
| use | 1173 K | 900 °C | 1652 °F | |
| WEL | 1173 K | 900 °C | 1652 °F | |
| CRC | | 900 °C | | |
| LNG | | 900 °C | | (Cf-252) |
99 Es einsteinium
| use | 1133 K | 860 °C | 1580 °F | |
| WEL | 1133 K | 860 °C | 1580 °F | |
| CRC | | 860 °C | | |
| LNG | | 860 °C | | |
100 Fm fermium (Fm-257 ?)
| use | 1800 K | 1527 °C | 2781 °F | |
| WEL | 1800 K | 1527 °C | 2781 °F | |
| CRC | | 1527 °C | | |
| LNG | | 1527 °C | | (Fm-257) |
101 Md mendelevium
| use | 1100 K | 827 °C | 1521 °F | |
| WEL | 1100 K | 827 °C | 1521 °F | |
| CRC | | 827 °C | | |
102 No nobelium
| use | 1100 K | 827 °C | 1521 °F | |
| WEL | 1100 K | 827 °C | 1521 °F | |
| CRC | | 827 °C | | |
103 Lr lawrencium
| use | 1900 K | 1627 °C | 2961 °F | |
| WEL | 1900 K | 1627 °C | 2961 °F | |
| CRC | | 1627 °C | | |
| LNG | | 1627 °C | | |

== Notes ==
- All values at standard pressure (101.325 kPa) unless noted. Triple point temperature values (marked "tp") are not valid at standard pressure.

== Periodic table ==
Melting point of the elements in the periodic table (Note: Values are in Kelvin (K) and Celsius (°C), rounded. For equivalents in Fahrenheit °F, see Melting points of the elements (data page).) (Note: Values for many highly radioactive elements are not empirically confirmed, or are theoretical predictions only.)
| Group → | 1 | 2 | | 3 | 4 | 5 | 6 | 7 | 8 | 9 | 10 | 11 | 12 | 13 | 14 | 15 | 16 | 17 | 18 |
|---|---|---|---|---|---|---|---|---|---|---|---|---|---|---|---|---|---|---|---|
| ↓ Period |
| ① | H_{2} 13.99 K (−259.16 °C) | | | | | | | | | | | | | | | | | | He (Note: Helium cannot freeze at atmospheric pressure, and so has no true melting point under these conditions.) |
| ② | Li453.65 K (180.50 °C) | Be1560 K (1287 °C) | | | | | | | | | | | | B 2349 K (2076 °C) | C (Note: Carbon does not melt at 1 atm, but sublimes at approximately 4000°C (4273 K).) | N_{2} 63.23 K (−209.86 °C) | O_{2} 54.36 K (−218.79 °C) | F_{2} 53.48 K (−219.67 °C) | Ne24.56 K (−248.59 °C) |
| ③ | Na370.944 K (97.794 °C) | Mg923 K (650 °C) | | | | | | | | | | | | Al933.47 K (660.32 °C) | Si1687 K (1414 °C) | P 317.3 K (44.15 °C) | S 388.36 K (115.21 °C) | Cl_{2}171.6 K (−101.5 °C) | Ar83.81 K (−189.34 °C) |
| ④ | K 336.7 K (63.5 °C) | Ca1115 K (842 °C) | | Sc1814 K (1541 °C) | Ti1941 K (1668 °C) | V 2183 K (1910 °C) | Cr2180 K (1907 °C) | Mn1519 K (1246 °C) | Fe1811 K (1538 °C) | Co1768 K (1495 °C) | Ni1728 K (1455 °C) | Cu1357.77 K (1084.62 °C) | Zn692.68 K (419.53 °C) | Ga302.9146 K (29.7646 °C) | Ge1211.40 K (938.25 °C) | As (Note: Arsenic does not melt at 1 atm, but sublimes at 615 °C (887 K).) | Se494 K (221 °C) | Br_{2}265.8 K (−7.2 °C) | Kr115.78 K (−157.37 °C) |
| ⑤ | Rb312.45 K (39.30 °C) | Sr1050 K (777 °C) | | Y 1799 K (1526 °C) | Zr2128 K (1855 °C) | Nb2750 K (2477 °C) | Mo2896 K (2623 °C) | Tc2430 K (2157 °C) | Ru2607 K (2334 °C) | Rh2237 K (1964 °C) | Pd1828.05 K (1554.9 °C) | Ag1234.93 K (961.78 °C) | Cd594.22 K (321.07 °C) | In429.7485 K (156.5985 °C) | Sn505.08 K (231.93 °C) | Sb903.78 K (630.63 °C) | Te722.66 K (449.51 °C) | I_{2} 386.85 K (113.7 °C) | Xe161.40 K (−111.75 °C) |
| ⑥ | Cs301.7 K (28.5 °C) | Ba1000 K (727 °C) | 1 asterisk | Lu1925 K (1652 °C) | Hf2506 K (2233 °C) | Ta3290 K (3017 °C) | W 3695 K (3422 °C) | Re3459 K (3186 °C) | Os3306 K (3033 °C) | Ir2719 K (2446 °C) | Pt2041.4 K (1768.3 °C) | Au1337.33 K (1064.18 °C) | Hg234.3210 K (−38.8290 °C) | Tl577 K (304 °C) | Pb600.61 K (327.46 °C) | Bi544.7 K (271.5 °C) | Po527 K (254 °C) | At575 K (302 °C) | Rn202 K (−71 °C) |
| ⑦ | Fr300 K (27 °C) | Ra973 K (700 °C) | 1 asterisk | Lr1900 K (1627 °C) | Rf2400 K (2100 °C) | Db | Sg | Bh | Hs | Mt | Ds | Rg | Cn283±11 K (10±11 °C) | Nh700 K (430 °C) | Fl200 K (−73 °C) | Mc670 K (400 °C) | Lv637–780 K (364–507 °C) | Ts623–823 K (350–550 °C) | Og325±15 K (52±15 °C) |
| 1 asterisk | | | | La1193 K (920 °C) | Ce1068 K (795 °C) | Pr1208 K (935 °C) | Nd1297 K (1024 °C) | Pm1315 K (1042 °C) | Sm1345 K (1072 °C) | Eu1099 K (826 °C) | Gd1585 K (1312 °C) | Tb1629 K (1356 °C) | Dy1680 K (1407 °C) | Ho1734 K (1461 °C) | Er1802 K (1529 °C) | Tm1818 K (1545 °C) | Yb1097 K (824 °C) |
| 1 asterisk | | | | Ac1500 K (1227 °C) | Th2023 K (1750 °C) | Pa1841 K (1568 °C) | U 1405.3 K (1132.2 °C) | Np912±3 K (639±3 °C) | Pu912.5 K (639.4 °C) | Am1449 K (1176 °C) | Cm1613 K (1340 °C) | Bk1259 K (986 °C) | Cf1173 K (900 °C) | Es1133 K (860 °C) | Fm1800 K (1527 °C) | Md1100 K (827 °C) | No1100 K (827 °C) |
Notes
Legend Primordial From decay Synthetic Border shows natural occurrence of the element: s-block / g-block / f-block / d-block / p-block

== See also ==
- Boiling points of the elements (data page)
- List of chemical elements
