= Group 4 element =

Group of chemical elements

Group 4 in the periodic table
Hydrogen																															Helium
Lithium	Beryllium																									Boron	Carbon	Nitrogen	Oxygen	Fluorine	Neon
Sodium	Magnesium																									Aluminium	Silicon	Phosphorus	Sulfur	Chlorine	Argon
Potassium	Calcium															Scandium	Titanium	Vanadium	Chromium	Manganese	Iron	Cobalt	Nickel	Copper	Zinc	Gallium	Germanium	Arsenic	Selenium	Bromine	Krypton
Rubidium	Strontium															Yttrium	Zirconium	Niobium	Molybdenum	Technetium	Ruthenium	Rhodium	Palladium	Silver	Cadmium	Indium	Tin	Antimony	Tellurium	Iodine	Xenon
Caesium	Barium	Lanthanum	Cerium	Praseodymium	Neodymium	Promethium	Samarium	Europium	Gadolinium	Terbium	Dysprosium	Holmium	Erbium	Thulium	Ytterbium	Lutetium	Hafnium	Tantalum	Tungsten	Rhenium	Osmium	Iridium	Platinum	Gold	Mercury (element)	Thallium	Lead	Bismuth	Polonium	Astatine	Radon
Francium	Radium	Actinium	Thorium	Protactinium	Uranium	Neptunium	Plutonium	Americium	Curium	Berkelium	Californium	Einsteinium	Fermium	Mendelevium	Nobelium	Lawrencium	Rutherfordium	Dubnium	Seaborgium	Bohrium	Hassium	Meitnerium	Darmstadtium	Roentgenium	Copernicium	Nihonium	Flerovium	Moscovium	Livermorium	Tennessine	Oganesson
group 3 ← → group 5
IUPAC group number	4
Name by element	titanium group
CAS group number (US, pattern A-B-A)	IVB
old IUPAC number (Europe, pattern A-B)	IVA

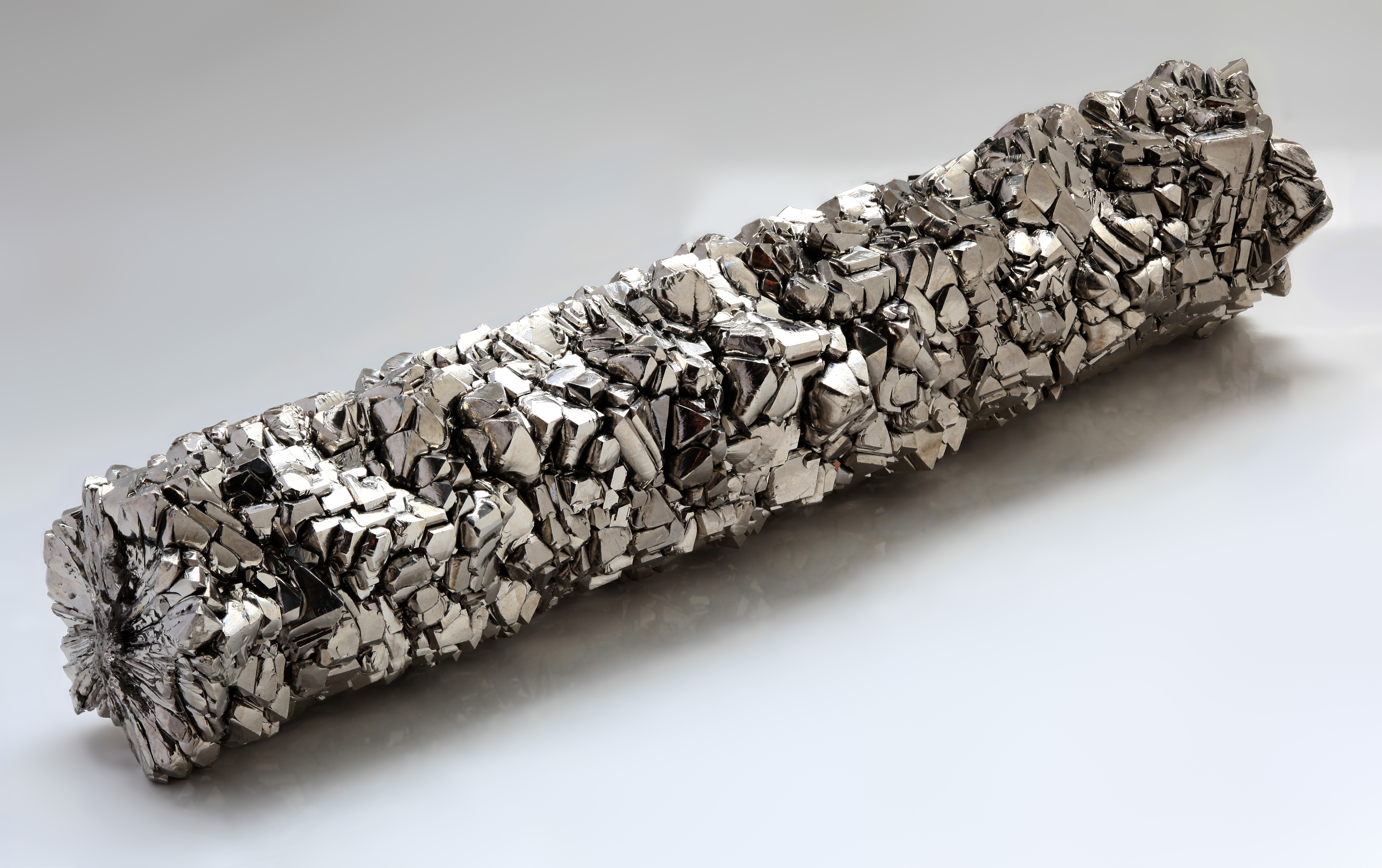
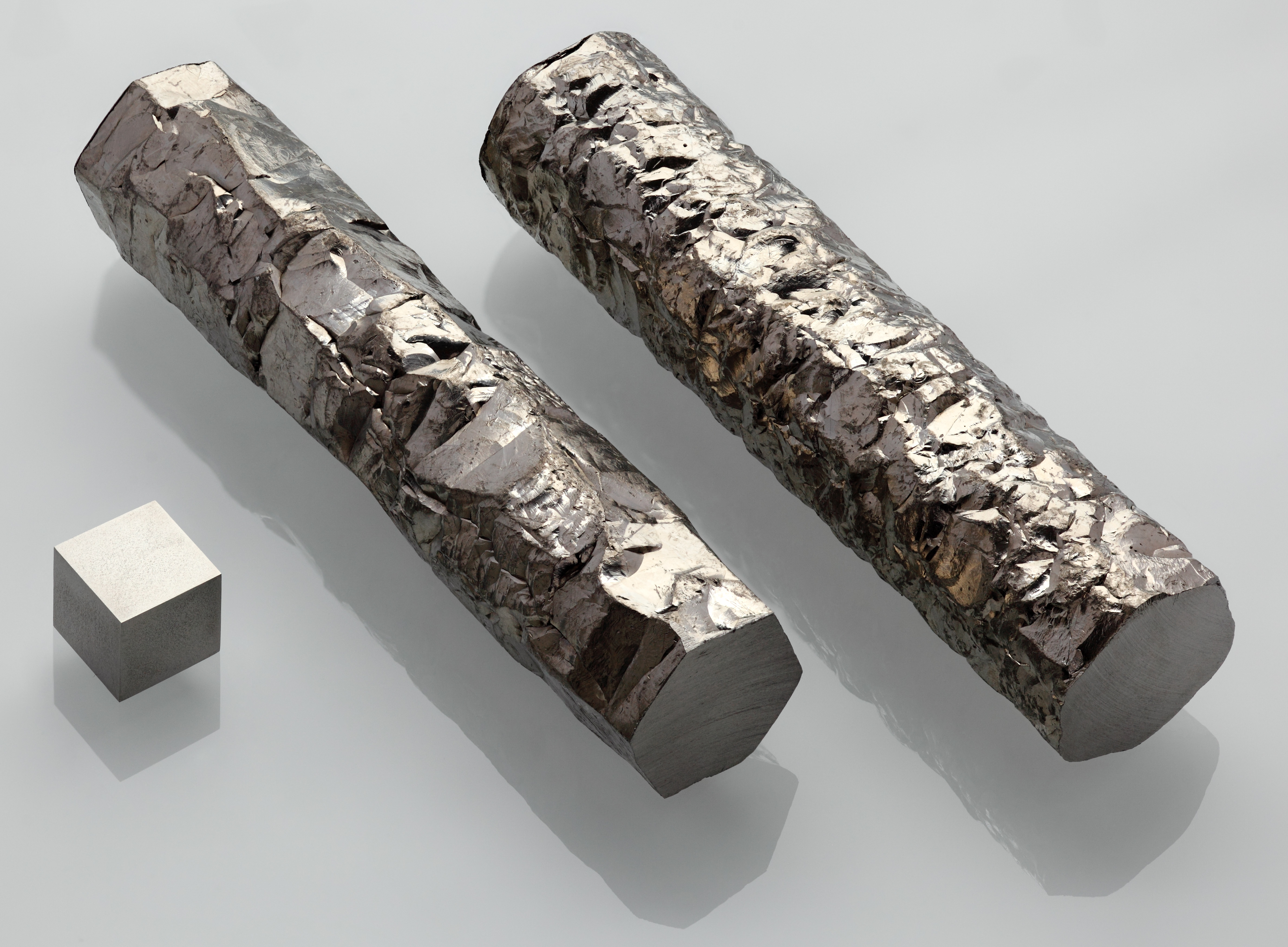
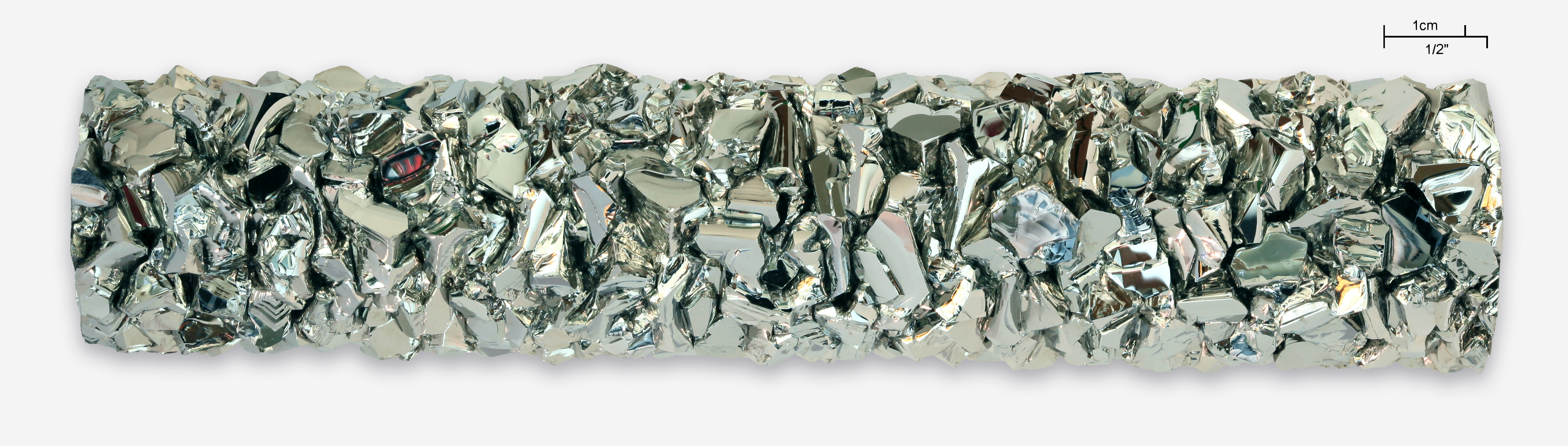
↓ Period
4	Titanium (Ti); 22 Transition metal
5	Zirconium (Zr); 40 Transition metal
6	Hafnium (Hf); 72 Transition metal
7	Rutherfordium (Rf); 104 Transition metal
Legend primordial element synthetic element

Group 4 is the second group of transition metals in the periodic table. It contains only the four elements titanium (Ti), zirconium (Zr), hafnium (Hf), and rutherfordium (Rf). The group is also called the titanium group or titanium family after its lightest member.

As is typical for early transition metals, zirconium and hafnium have only the group oxidation state of +4 as a major one, and are quite electropositive and have a less rich coordination chemistry. Due to the effects of the lanthanide contraction, they are very similar in properties. Titanium is somewhat distinct due to its smaller size: it has a well-defined +3 state as well (although +4 is more stable).

All the group 4 elements are hard. Their inherent reactivity is completely masked due to the formation of a dense oxide layer that protects them from corrosion, as well as attack by many acids and alkalis. The first three of them occur naturally. Rutherfordium is strongly radioactive: it does not occur naturally and must be produced by artificial synthesis, but its observed and theoretically predicted properties are consistent with it being a heavier homologue of hafnium. None of them have any biological role.

== History ==
Zircon was known as a gemstone from ancient times, but it was not known to contain a new element until the work of German chemist Martin Heinrich Klaproth in 1789. He analysed the zircon-containing mineral jargoon and found a new earth (oxide), but was unable to isolate the element from its oxide. Cornish chemist Humphry Davy also attempted to isolate this new element in 1808 through electrolysis, but failed: he gave it the name zirconium. In 1824, Swedish chemist Jöns Jakob Berzelius isolated an impure form of zirconium, obtained by heating a mixture of potassium and potassium zirconium hexafluoride in an iron tube.

Cornish mineralogist William Gregor first identified titanium in ilmenite sand beside a stream in Cornwall, Great Britain in the year 1791. After analyzing the sand, he determined the weakly magnetic sand to contain iron oxide and a metal oxide that he could not identify. During that same year, mineralogist Franz Joseph Muller produced the same metal oxide and could not identify it. In 1795, chemist Martin Heinrich Klaproth independently rediscovered the metal oxide in rutile from the Hungarian village Boinik. He identified the oxide containing a new element and named it for the Titans of Greek mythology. Berzelius was also the first to prepare titanium metal (albeit impurely), doing so in 1825.

The X-ray spectroscopy done by Henry Moseley in 1914 showed a direct dependency between spectral line and effective nuclear charge. This led to the nuclear charge, or atomic number of an element, being used to ascertain its place within the periodic table. With this method, Moseley determined the number of lanthanides and showed that there was a missing element with atomic number 72. This spurred chemists to look for it. Georges Urbain asserted that he found element 72 in the rare earth elements in 1907 and published his results on celtium in 1911. Neither the spectra nor the chemical behavior he claimed matched with the element found later, and therefore his claim was turned down after a long-standing controversy.

By early 1923, several physicists and chemists such as Niels Bohr and Charles Rugeley Bury suggested that element 72 should resemble zirconium and therefore was not part of the rare earth elements group. These suggestions were based on Bohr's theories of the atom, the X-ray spectroscopy of Moseley, and the chemical arguments of Friedrich Paneth. Encouraged by this, and by the reappearance in 1922 of Urbain's claims that element 72 was a rare earth element discovered in 1911, Dirk Coster and Georg von Hevesy were motivated to search for the new element in zirconium ores. Hafnium was discovered by the two in 1923 in Copenhagen, Denmark. The place where the discovery took place led to the element being named for the Latin name for "Copenhagen", Hafnia, the home town of Niels Bohr.

Hafnium was separated from zirconium through repeated recrystallization of the double ammonium or potassium fluorides by Valdemar Thal Jantzen and von Hevesy. Anton Eduard van Arkel and Jan Hendrik de Boer were the first to prepare metallic hafnium by passing hafnium tetraiodide vapor over a heated tungsten filament in 1924. The long delay between the discovery of the lightest two group 4 elements and that of hafnium was partly due to the rarity of hafnium, and partly due to the extreme similarity of zirconium and hafnium, so that all previous samples of zirconium had in reality been contaminated with hafnium without anyone knowing.

The last element of the group, rutherfordium, does not occur naturally and had to be made by synthesis. The first reported detection was by a team at the Joint Institute for Nuclear Research (JINR), which in 1964 claimed to have produced the new element by bombarding a plutonium-242 target with neon-22 ions, although this was later put into question. More conclusive evidence was obtained by researchers at the University of California, Berkeley, who synthesised element 104 in 1969 by bombarding a californium-249 target with carbon-12 ions. A controversy erupted on who had discovered the element, which each group suggesting its own name: the Dubna group named the element kurchatovium after Igor Kurchatov, while the Berkeley group named it rutherfordium after Ernest Rutherford. Eventually a joint working party of IUPAC and IUPAP, the Transfermium Working Group, decided that credit for the discovery should be shared. After various compromises were attempted, in 1997, IUPAC officially named the element rutherfordium following the American proposal.

== Characteristics ==
=== Chemical ===
Electron configurations of the group 4 elements
Z	Element	Electrons per shell	Electron configuration
22	Ti, titanium	2, 8, 10, 2	[Ar] 3d^{2} 4s^{2}
40	Zr, zirconium	2, 8, 18, 10, 2	[Kr] 4d^{2} 5s^{2}
72	Hf, hafnium	2, 8, 18, 32, 10, 2	[Xe] 4f^{14} 5d^{2} 6s^{2}
104	Rf, rutherfordium	2, 8, 18, 32, 32, 10, 2	[Rn] 5f^{14} 6d^{2} 7s^{2}

Like other groups, the members of this family show patterns in their electron configurations, especially the outermost shells, resulting in trends in chemical behavior. Most of the chemistry has been observed only for the first three members of the group; chemical properties of rutherfordium are not well-characterized, but what is known and predicted matches its position as a heavier homolog of hafnium.

Titanium, zirconium, and hafnium are reactive metals, but this is masked in the bulk form because they form a dense oxide layer that sticks to the metal and reforms even if removed. As such, the bulk metals are very resistant to chemical attack; most aqueous acids have no effect unless heated, and aqueous alkalis have no effect even when hot. Oxidizing acids such as nitric acids indeed tend to reduce reactivity as they induce the formation of this oxide layer. The exception is hydrofluoric acid, as it forms soluble fluoro complexes of the metals. When finely divided, their reactivity shows as they become pyrophoric, directly reacting with oxygen and hydrogen, and even nitrogen in the case of titanium. All three are fairly electropositive, although less so than their predecessors in group 3. The oxides TiO_{2}, ZrO_{2} and HfO_{2} are white solids with high melting points and unreactive against most acids.

The chemistry of group 4 elements is dominated by the group oxidation state. Zirconium and hafnium are in particular extremely similar, with the most salient differences being physical rather than chemical (melting and boiling points of compounds and their solubility in solvents). This is an effect of the lanthanide contraction: the expected increase of atomic radius from the 4d to the 5d elements is wiped out by the insertion of the 4f elements before. Titanium, being smaller, is distinct from these two: its oxide is less basic than those of zirconium and hafnium, and its aqueous chemistry is more hydrolyzed. Rutherfordium should have a still more basic oxide than zirconium and hafnium.

The chemistry of all three is dominated by the +4 oxidation state, though this is too high to be well-described as totally ionic. Low oxidation states are not well-represented for zirconium and hafnium (and should be even less well-represented for rutherfordium); the +3 oxidation state of zirconium and hafnium reduces water. For titanium, this oxidation state is merely easily oxidised, forming a violet Ti^{3+} aqua cation in solution. The elements have a significant coordination chemistry: zirconium and hafnium are large enough to readily support the coordination number of 8. All three metals however form weak sigma bonds to carbon and because they have few d electrons, pi backbonding is not very effective either.

=== Physical ===
The trends in group 4 follow those of the other early d-block groups and reflect the addition of a filled f-shell into the core in passing from the fifth to the sixth period. All the stable members of the group are silvery refractory metals, though impurities of carbon, nitrogen, and oxygen make them brittle. They all crystallize in the hexagonal close-packed structure at room temperature, and rutherfordium is expected to do the same. At high temperatures, titanium, zirconium, and hafnium transform to a body-centered cubic structure. While they are better conductors of heat and electricity than their group 3 predecessors, they are still poor compared to most metals. This, along with the higher melting and boiling points, and enthalpies of fusion, vaporization, and atomization, reflects the extra d electron available for metallic bonding.

The table below is a summary of the key physical properties of the group 4 elements. The four question-marked values are extrapolated.

Properties of the group 4 elements
Name	Ti, titanium	Zr, zirconium	Hf, hafnium	Rf, rutherfordium
Melting point	1941 K (1668 °C)	2130 K (1857 °C)	2506 K (2233 °C)	2400 K (2100 °C)?
Boiling point	3560 K (3287 °C)	4682 K (4409 °C)	4876 K (4603 °C)	5800 K (5500 °C)?
Density	4.507 g·cm^{−3}	6.511 g·cm^{−3}	13.31 g·cm^{−3}	17 g·cm^{−3}?
Appearance	silver metallic	silver white	silver gray	?
Atomic radius	140 pm	155 pm	155 pm	150 pm?

==== Titanium ====
As a metal, titanium is recognized for its high strength-to-weight ratio, which by definition refers to tensile strength. It is a strong metal with low density that is quite ductile (especially in an oxygen-free environment), lustrous, and metallic-white in color. Due to its relatively high melting point (1,668 °C or 3,034 °F) it has sometimes been described as a refractory metal, but this is not the case. It is paramagnetic and has fairly low electrical and thermal conductivity compared to other metals. Titanium is superconducting when cooled below its critical temperature of 0.49 K.

==== Zirconium ====
Zirconium is a lustrous, greyish-white, soft, ductile, malleable metal that is solid at room temperature, though it is hard and brittle at lesser purities. In powder form, zirconium is highly flammable, but the solid form is much less prone to ignition. Zirconium is highly resistant to corrosion by alkalis, acids, salt water, and other agents. However, it will dissolve in hydrochloric and sulfuric acid, especially when fluorine is present. Alloys with zinc are magnetic at less than 35 K.

==== Hafnium ====
Hafnium is a shiny, silvery, ductile metal that is corrosion-resistant and chemically similar to zirconium in that they have the same number of valence electrons and are in the same group. Also, their relativistic effects are similar: The expected expansion of atomic radii from period 5 to 6 is almost exactly canceled out by the lanthanide contraction. Hafnium changes from its alpha form, a hexagonal close-packed lattice, to its beta form, a body-centered cubic lattice, at 2,388 K (2,115 °C; 3,839 °F). The physical properties of hafnium metal samples are markedly affected by zirconium impurities, especially the nuclear properties, as these two elements are among the most difficult to separate because of their chemical similarity.

==== Rutherfordium ====
Rutherfordium is expected to be a solid under normal conditions and have a hexagonal close-packed crystal structure (^{c}/_{a} = 1.61), similar to its lighter congener hafnium. It should be a metal with density ~17 g/cm^{3}. The atomic radius of rutherfordium is expected to be ~150 pm. Due to relativistic stabilization of the 7s orbital and destabilization of the 6d orbital, Rf^{+} and Rf^{2+} ions are predicted to give up 6d electrons instead of 7s electrons, which is the opposite of the behavior of its lighter homologs. When under high pressure (variously calculated as 72 or ~50 GPa), rutherfordium is expected to transition to body-centered cubic crystal structure; hafnium transforms to this structure at 71±1 GPa, but has an intermediate ω structure that it transforms to at 38±8 GPa that should be lacking for rutherfordium.

== Production ==
The production of the metals itself is difficult due to their reactivity. The formation of oxides, nitrides, and carbides must be avoided to yield workable metals; this is normally achieved by the Kroll process. The oxides (MO_{2}) are reacted with coal and chlorine to form the chlorides (MCl_{4}). The chlorides of the metals are then reacted with magnesium, yielding magnesium chloride and the metals.

Further purification is done by a chemical transport reaction developed by Anton Eduard van Arkel and Jan Hendrik de Boer. In a closed vessel, the metal reacts with iodine at temperatures above 500 °C forming metal(IV) iodide; at a tungsten filament of nearly 2000 °C the reverse reaction happens and the iodine and metal are set free. The metal forms a solid coating on the tungsten filament and the iodine can react with additional metal resulting in a steady turnover.

M + 2 I_{2} (low temp.) → MI_{4}
MI_{4} (high temp.) → M + 2 I_{2}

== Occurrence ==
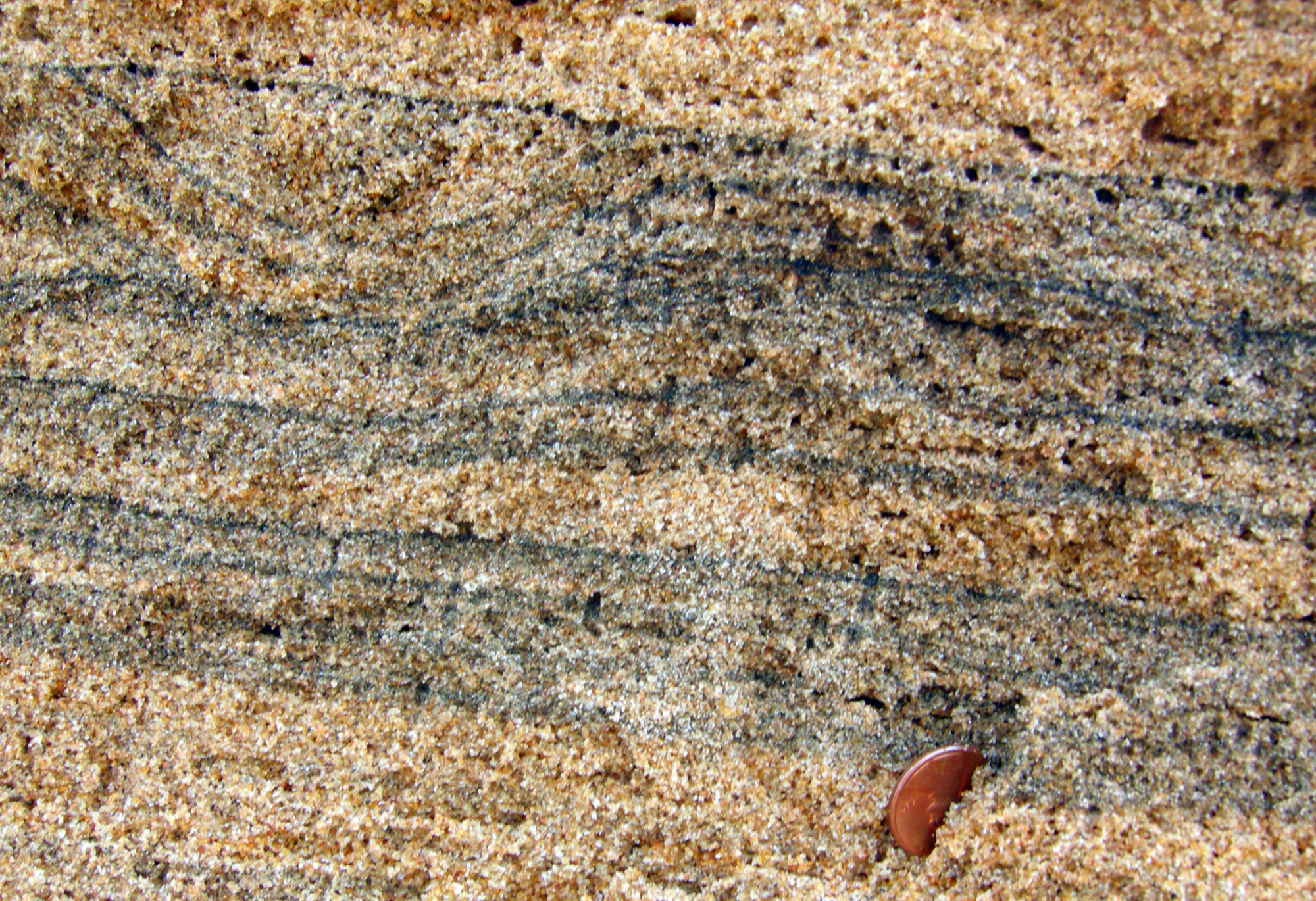
Heavy minerals (dark) in a quartz beach sand (Chennai, India).

The abundance of the group 4 metals decreases with increase of atomic mass. Titanium is the seventh most abundant metal in Earth's crust and has an abundance of 6320 ppm, while zirconium has an abundance of 162 ppm and hafnium has only an abundance of 3 ppm.

All three stable elements occur in heavy mineral sands ore deposits, which are placer deposits formed, most usually in beach environments, by concentration due to the specific gravity of the mineral grains of erosion material from mafic and ultramafic rock. The titanium minerals are mostly anatase and rutile, and zirconium occurs in the mineral zircon. Because of the chemical similarity, up to 5% of the zirconium in zircon is replaced by hafnium. The largest producers of the group 4 elements are Australia, South Africa and Canada.

== Applications ==
Titanium metal and its alloys have a wide range of applications, where the corrosion resistance, the heat stability and the low density (light weight) are of benefit. The foremost use of corrosion-resistant hafnium and zirconium has been in nuclear reactors. Zirconium has a very low and hafnium has a high thermal neutron-capture cross-section. Therefore, zirconium (mostly as zircaloy) is used as cladding of fuel rods in nuclear reactors, while hafnium is used in control rods for nuclear reactors, because each hafnium atom can absorb multiple neutrons.

Smaller amounts of hafnium and zirconium are used in super alloys to improve the properties of those alloys.

== Biological occurrences ==
The group 4 elements are hard refractory metals with low aqueous solubility and low availability to the biosphere. Titanium and zirconium are relatively abundant, whereas hafnium is rare in the environment, and rutherfordium non-existent.

Titanium has no known role in any organism's biology. However, many studies suggest that titanium could be biologically active. Most titanium on Earth is stored within insoluble minerals, so it is unlikely to be a part of any biological system in spite of being potentially biologically active.

Zirconium plays no known role in any biological system, but is common in biological systems. Certain antiperspirant products use Aluminium zirconium tetrachlorohydrex gly to block sweat pores in the skin.

Hafnium plays no known role in any biological system, and has low toxicity.

Rutherfordium is synthetic, expensive, and radioactive: the most stable isotopes have half-lives under an hour. Few chemical properties and no biological functions are known.

== Precautions ==
Titanium is non-toxic even in large doses and does not play any natural role inside the human body. An estimated quantity of 0.8 milligrams of titanium is ingested by humans each day, but most passes through without being absorbed in the tissues. It does, however, sometimes bio-accumulate in tissues that contain silica. One study indicates a possible connection between titanium and yellow nail syndrome.

Zirconium powder can cause irritation, but only contact with the eyes requires medical attention. OSHA recommendations for zirconium are 5 mg/m^{3} time weighted average limit and a 10 mg/m^{3} short-term exposure limit.

Only limited data exists on the toxicology of hafnium. Care needs to be taken when machining hafnium because it is pyrophoric—fine particles can spontaneously combust when exposed to air. Compounds that contain this metal are rarely encountered by most people. The pure metal is not considered toxic, but hafnium compounds should be handled as if they were toxic because the ionic forms of metals are normally at greatest risk for toxicity, and limited animal testing has been done for hafnium compounds.

== Bibliography ==
- Greenwood, Norman N.; Earnshaw, Alan (1997). Chemistry of the Elements (2nd ed.). Butterworth-Heinemann. doi:10.1016/C2009-0-30414-6. ISBN 978-0-08-037941-8.
