= Period (periodic table) =

Method of visualizing the relationship between elements

In the periodic table of the elements, each numbered row is a period.

A period on the periodic table is a row of chemical elements. All elements in a row have the same number of electron shells. Each next element in a period has one more proton and is less metallic than its predecessor. Arranged this way, elements in the same group (column) have similar chemical and physical properties, reflecting the periodic law. For example, the halogens lie in the second-to-last group (group 17) and share similar properties, such as high reactivity and the tendency to gain one electron to arrive at a noble-gas electronic configuration. As of 2026, a total of 118 elements have been discovered and confirmed.

The Madelung energy ordering rule describes the order in which orbitals are arranged by increasing energy according to the Madelung rule. Each diagonal corresponds to a different value of n + l.

Modern quantum mechanics explains these periodic trends in properties in terms of electron shells. As atomic number increases, shells fill with electrons in approximately the order shown in the ordering rule diagram. The filling of each shell corresponds to a row in the table.

In the f-block and p-block of the periodic table, elements within the same period generally do not exhibit trends and similarities in properties (vertical trends down groups are more significant). However, in the d-block, trends across periods become significant, and in the f-block elements show a high degree of similarity across periods.

== Periods ==
There are currently seven complete periods in the periodic table, comprising the 118 known elements. Any new elements will be placed into an eighth period; see extended periodic table. The elements are colour-coded below by their block: red for the s-block, yellow for the p-block, blue for the d-block, and green for the f-block.

=== Period 1 ===
| Group | 1 | 18 |
|---|---|---|
| Atomic # Name | 1 H | 2 He |

The first period contains fewer elements than any other, with only two, hydrogen and helium. They therefore do not follow the octet rule, but rather a duplet rule. Chemically, helium behaves like a noble gas, and thus is taken to be part of the group 18 elements. However, in terms of its nuclear structure it belongs to the s-block, and is therefore sometimes classified as a group 2 element, or simultaneously both 2 and 18. Hydrogen readily loses and gains an electron, and so behaves chemically as both a group 1 and a group 17 element.

- Hydrogen (H) is the most abundant of the chemical elements, constituting roughly 75% of the universe's elemental mass. Ionized hydrogen is a sole proton. Stars in the main sequence are mainly composed of hydrogen in its plasma state. Elemental hydrogen is relatively rare on Earth, and is industrially produced from hydrocarbons such as methane. Hydrogen can form compounds with most elements and is present in water and most organic compounds.
- Helium (He) exists only as a gas except in extreme conditions. It is the second-lightest element and is the second-most abundant in the universe. Most helium was formed during the Big Bang, but new helium is created through nuclear fusion of hydrogen in stars. On Earth, helium is relatively rare, only occurring as a byproduct of the natural decay of some radioactive elements. Such 'radiogenic' helium is trapped within natural gas in concentrations of up to seven percent by volume.

=== Period 2 ===
| Group | 1 | 2 | 13 | 14 | 15 | 16 | 17 | 18 |
|---|---|---|---|---|---|---|---|---|
| Atomic # Name | 3 Li | 4 Be | 5 B | 6 C | 7 N | 8 O | 9 F | 10; Ne |

Period 2 elements involve the 2s and 2p orbitals. They include the biologically most essential elements besides hydrogen: carbon, nitrogen, and oxygen.

- Lithium (Li) is the lightest metal and the least dense solid element. In its non-ionized state it is one of the most reactive elements, and so is only ever found naturally in compounds. It is the heaviest primordial element forged in large quantities during the Big Bang.
- Beryllium (Be) has one of the highest melting points of all the light metals. Small amounts of beryllium were synthesised during the Big Bang, although most of it decayed or reacted further within stars to create larger nuclei, like carbon, nitrogen or oxygen. Beryllium is classified by the International Agency for Research on Cancer as a group 1 carcinogen. Between 1% and 15% of people are sensitive to beryllium and may develop an inflammatory reaction in their respiratory system and skin, called chronic beryllium disease. The primary mirrors on the James Webb Space Telescope (JWST) are made of beryllium.
- Boron (B) does not occur naturally as a free element, but in compounds such as borates. It is an essential plant micronutrient, required for cell wall strength and development, cell division, seed and fruit development, sugar transport and hormone development, though high levels are toxic.
- Carbon (C) is the fourth-most abundant element in the universe by mass after hydrogen, helium and oxygen and is the second-most abundant element in the human body by mass after oxygen, the third-most abundant by number of atoms. There are an almost infinite number of compounds that contain carbon due to carbon's ability to form long stable chains of C—C bonds. All organic compounds, those essential for life, contain at least one atom of carbon; combined with hydrogen, oxygen, nitrogen, sulfur, and phosphorus, carbon is the basis of every important biological compound.
- Nitrogen (N) is found mainly as mostly inert diatomic gas, N_{2}, which makes up 78% of the Earth's atmosphere by volume. It is an essential component of proteins and therefore of life.
- Oxygen (O) comprising 21% of the atmosphere by volume and is required for respiration by all (or nearly all) animals, as well as being the principal component of water. Oxygen is the third-most abundant element in the universe, and oxygen compounds dominate the Earth's crust.
- Fluorine (F) is the most reactive element in its non-ionized state, and so is never found that way in nature.
- Neon (Ne) is a noble gas used in neon lighting.

=== Period 3 ===
| Group | 1 | 2 | 13 | 14 | 15 | 16 | 17 | 18 |
|---|---|---|---|---|---|---|---|---|
| Atomic # Name | 11; Na | 12; Mg | 13; Al | 14; Si | 15; P | 16; S | 17; Cl | 18; Ar |

All period three elements occur in nature and have at least one stable isotope. All but the noble gas argon are essential to basic geology and biology.

- Sodium (Na) is an alkali metal. It is present in Earth's oceans in large quantities in the form of sodium chloride (table salt).
- Magnesium (Mg) is an alkaline earth metal. Magnesium ions are found in chlorophyll.
- Aluminium (Al) is a post-transition metal. It is the most abundant metal in the Earth's crust.
- Silicon (Si) is a metalloid. It is a semiconductor, making it the principal component in many integrated circuits. Silicon dioxide is the principal constituent of sand. As Carbon is to Biology, Silicon is to Geology.
- Phosphorus (P) is a nonmetal essential to DNA. It is highly reactive, and as such is never found in nature as a free element.
- Sulfur (S) is a nonmetal. It is found in two amino acids: cysteine and methionine.
- Chlorine (Cl) is a halogen. Since it is one of the most reactive elements, it is often found on the Earth's surface as sodium chloride. Its compounds used as a disinfectant, especially in swimming pools.
- Argon (Ar) is a noble gas, making it almost entirely nonreactive. Incandescent lamps are often filled with noble gases such as argon in order to preserve the filaments at high temperatures.

=== Period 4 ===
| Group | 1 | 2 | 3 | 4 | 5 | 6 | 7 | 8 | 9 | 10 | 11 | 12 | 13 | 14 | 15 | 16 | 17 | 18 |
|---|---|---|---|---|---|---|---|---|---|---|---|---|---|---|---|---|---|---|
| Atomic # Name | 19; K | 20; Ca | 21; Sc | 22; Ti | 23; V | 24; Cr | 25; Mn | 26; Fe | 27; Co | 28; Ni | 29; Cu | 30; Zn | 31; Ga | 32; Ge | 33; As | 34; Se | 35; Br | 36; Kr |

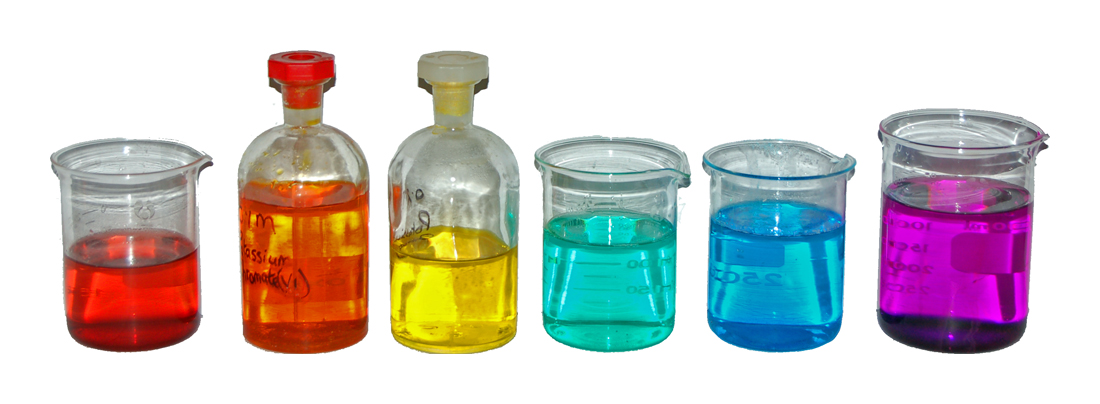
From left to right, aqueous solutions of: Co(NO_{3})_{2} (red); K_{2}Cr_{2}O_{7} (orange); K_{2}CrO_{4} (yellow); NiCl_{2} (green); CuSO_{4} (blue); KMnO_{4} (purple).

Period 4 includes the biologically essential elements potassium and calcium, and is the first period in the d-block with the lighter transition metals. These include iron, the heaviest element forged in main-sequence stars and a principal component of the Earth, as well as other important metals such as cobalt, nickel, and copper. Almost all have biological roles.

Completing the fourth period are six p-block elements: gallium, germanium, arsenic, selenium, bromine, and krypton.

=== Period 5 ===
| Group | 1 | 2 | 3 | 4 | 5 | 6 | 7 | 8 | 9 | 10 | 11 | 12 | 13 | 14 | 15 | 16 | 17 | 18 |
|---|---|---|---|---|---|---|---|---|---|---|---|---|---|---|---|---|---|---|
| Atomic # Name | 37; Rb | 38; Sr | 39; Y | 40; Zr | 41; Nb | 42; Mo | 43; Tc | 44; Ru | 45; Rh | 46; Pd | 47; Ag | 48; Cd | 49; In | 50; Sn | 51; Sb | 52; Te | 53; I | 54; Xe |

Period 5 has the same number of elements as period 4 and follows the same general structure but with one more post transition metal and one fewer nonmetal. Of the three heaviest elements with biological roles, two (molybdenum and iodine) are in this period; tungsten, in period 6, is heavier, along with several of the early lanthanides. Period 5 also includes technetium, the lightest exclusively radioactive element.

=== Period 6 ===
| Group | 1 | 2 | | | | | | | | | | | | | | | 3 | 4 | 5 | 6 | 7 | 8 | 9 | 10 | 11 | 12 | 13 | 14 | 15 | 16 | 17 | 18 |
|---|---|---|---|---|---|---|---|---|---|---|---|---|---|---|---|---|---|---|---|---|---|---|---|---|---|---|---|---|---|---|---|---|
| Atomic # Name | 55; Cs | 56; Ba | 57; La | 58; Ce | 59; Pr | 60; Nd | 61; Pm | 62; Sm | 63; Eu | 64; Gd | 65; Tb | 66; Dy | 67; Ho | 68; Er | 69; Tm | 70; Yb | 71; Lu | 72; Hf | 73; Ta | 74; W | 75; Re | 76; Os | 77; Ir | 78; Pt | 79; Au | 80; Hg | 81; Tl | 82; Pb | 83; Bi | 84; Po | 85; At | 86; Rn |

Period 6 is the first period to include the f-block with the lanthanides, and includes the heaviest stable elements. Many of these heavy metals are toxic and some are radioactive, but platinum and gold are largely inert.

=== Period 7 ===
| Group | 1 | 2 | | | | | | | | | | | | | | | 3 | 4 | 5 | 6 | 7 | 8 | 9 | 10 | 11 | 12 | 13 | 14 | 15 | 16 | 17 | 18 |
|---|---|---|---|---|---|---|---|---|---|---|---|---|---|---|---|---|---|---|---|---|---|---|---|---|---|---|---|---|---|---|---|---|
| Atomic # Name | 87; Fr | 88; Ra | 89; Ac | 90; Th | 91; Pa | 92; U | 93; Np | 94; Pu | 95; Am | 96; Cm | 97; Bk | 98; Cf | 99; Es | 100; Fm | 101; Md | 102; No | 103; Lr | 104; Rf | 105; Db | 106; Sg | 107; Bh | 108; Hs | 109; Mt | 110; Ds | 111; Rg | 112; Cn | 113; Nh | 114; Fl | 115; Mc | 116; Lv | 117; Ts | 118; Og |

All elements of period 7 are radioactive. This period contains the heaviest element which occurs naturally on Earth, plutonium. All of the subsequent elements in the period have been synthesized artificially. Whilst five of these (from americium to einsteinium) are now available in macroscopic quantities, most are extremely rare, having only been prepared in microgram amounts or less. Some of the later elements have only ever been identified in laboratories in quantities of a few atoms at a time.

Although the rarity of many of these elements means that experimental results are not very extensive, periodic and group trends in behaviour appear to be less well defined for period 7 than for other periods. Whilst francium and radium do show typical properties of groups 1 and 2, respectively, the actinides display a much greater variety of behaviour and oxidation states than the lanthanides. These peculiarities of period 7 may be due to a variety of factors, including a large degree of spin–orbit coupling and relativistic effects, ultimately caused by the very high positive electrical charge from their massive atomic nuclei.

=== Period 8 ===
No element of the eighth period has yet been synthesized. A g-block is predicted. It is not clear if all elements predicted for the eighth period are in fact physically possible. Therefore, there may not be a ninth period.

== See also ==
- Group (periodic table)
