= Group (periodic table) =

Column of elements in the periodic table of the chemical elements

In the periodic table of the elements, each column is a group.

In chemistry, a group (also known as a family) is a column of elements in the periodic table of the chemical elements. There are 18 numbered groups in the periodic table; the 14 f-block columns, between groups 2 and 3, are not numbered. The elements in a group have similar physical or chemical characteristics of the outermost electron shells of their atoms (i.e., the same core charge), because most chemical properties are dominated by the orbital location of the outermost electron.

The modern numbering system of "group 1" to "group 18" has been recommended by the International Union of Pure and Applied Chemistry (IUPAC) since 1988. The 1-18 system is based on each atom's s, p and d electrons beyond those in atoms of the preceding noble gas. Two older incompatible naming schemes can assign the same number to different groups depending on the system being used. The older schemes were used by the Chemical Abstract Service (CAS, more popular in the United States), and by IUPAC before 1988 (more popular in Europe). The system of eighteen groups is generally accepted by the chemistry community, but some dissent exists about membership of elements number 1 and 2 (hydrogen and helium). Similar variation on the inner transition metals continues to exist in textbooks, although the correct positioning has been known since 1948 and was twice endorsed by IUPAC in 1988 (together with the 1–18 numbering) and 2021.

Groups may also be identified using their topmost element, or have a specific name. For example, group 16 is also described as the "oxygen group" and as the "chalcogens". An exception is the "iron group", which usually refers to group 8, but in chemistry may also mean iron, cobalt, and nickel, or some other set of elements with similar chemical properties. In astrophysics and nuclear physics, it usually refers to iron, cobalt, nickel, chromium, and manganese.

== Group names ==
Modern group names are numbers 1–18, with the 14 f-block columns remaining unnumbered (together making the 32 columns in the periodic table). Also, trivial names (like halogens) are common. In history, several sets of group names have been used, based on Roman numberings I–VIII, and "A" and "B" suffixes.

Groups in the periodic table

IUPAC group	1^{a}	2	—^{b}	3^{c}	4	5	6	7	8	9	10	11	12	13	14	15	16	17	18
Mendeleev (I–VIII)	I	II		III	IV	V	VI	VII	VIII			I	II	III	IV	V	VI	VII	^{d}
CAS (US, A-B-A)	IA	IIA		IIIB	IVB	VB	VIB	VIIB	VIIIB			IB	IIB	IIIA	IVA	VA	VIA	VIIA	VIIIA
Old IUPAC (Europe, A–B)	IA	IIA		IIIA	IVA	VA	VIA	VIIA	VIII			IB	IIB	IIIB	IVB	VB	VIB	VIIB	0
Trivial name^{r}	H and alkali metals	alkaline earth metals	lanthanoids actinoids											triels	tetrels	pnictogens	chalcogens	halogens	noble gases
Name by element^{r}	lithium group	beryllium group		scandium group	titanium group	vanadium group	chromium group	manganese group	iron group	cobalt group	nickel group	copper group	zinc group	boron group	carbon group	nitrogen group	oxygen group	fluorine group	helium or neon group
Period 1	H																		He
Period 2	Li	Be												B	C	N	O	F	Ne
Period 3	Na	Mg												Al	Si	P	S	Cl	Ar
Period 4	K	Ca		Sc	Ti	V	Cr	Mn	Fe	Co	Ni	Cu	Zn	Ga	Ge	As	Se	Br	Kr
Period 5	Rb	Sr		Y	Zr	Nb	Mo	Tc	Ru	Rh	Pd	Ag	Cd	In	Sn	Sb	Te	I	Xe
Period 6	Cs	Ba	La–Yb	Lu	Hf	Ta	W	Re	Os	Ir	Pt	Au	Hg	Tl	Pb	Bi	Po	At	Rn
Period 7	Fr	Ra	Ac–No	Lr	Rf	Db	Sg	Bh	Hs	Mt	Ds	Rg	Cn	Nh	Fl	Mc	Lv	Ts	Og

^{a} Group 1 is composed of hydrogen (H) and the alkali metals. Elements of the group have one s-electron in the outer electron shell. Hydrogen is not considered to be an alkali metal as it is not a metal, though it is more analogous to them than any other group. This makes the group somewhat exceptional.
^{b} The 14 f-block groups (columns) do not have a group number.
^{c} The correct composition of group 3 is scandium (Sc), yttrium (Y), lutetium (Lu), and lawrencium (Lr), as shown here: this is endorsed by 1988 and 2021 IUPAC reports on the question. General inorganic chemistry texts often put scandium (Sc), yttrium (Y), lanthanum (La), and actinium (Ac) in group 3, so that Ce–Lu and Th–Lr become the f-block between groups 3 and 4; this was based on incorrectly measured electron configurations from history, and Lev Landau and Evgeny Lifshitz already considered it incorrect in 1948. Arguments can still occasionally be encountered in the contemporary literature purporting to defend it, but most authors consider them logically inconsistent. Some sources follow a compromise that puts La–Lu and Ac–Lr as the f-block rows (despite that giving 15 f-block elements in each row, which contradicts quantum mechanics), leaving the heavier members of group 3 ambiguous. See also Group 3 element#Composition.
^{d} Group 18, the noble gases, had not been discovered at the time of Mendeleev's original table. Later (1902), Mendeleev accepted the evidence for their existence, and they could be placed in a new "group 0", consistently and without breaking the periodic table principle.
^{r} Group name as recommended by IUPAC.

=== List of group names ===
IUPAC name	Old IUPAC (Europe)	Old CAS name (U.S.)	Name by element ('group' or 'family')	IUPAC recommended trivial name	Other names
Group 1	IA	IA	lithium group	hydrogen and alkali metals	"lithium group" excludes hydrogen
Group 2	IIA	IIA	beryllium group	alkaline earth metals	
Group 3	IIIA	IIIB	scandium group		
Group 4	IVA	IVB	titanium group		
Group 5	VA	VB	vanadium group		
Group 6	VIA	VIB	chromium group		
Group 7	VIIA	VIIB	manganese group		
Group 8	VIII	VIIIB	iron group		
Group 9	VIII	VIIIB	cobalt group		
Group 10	VIII	VIIIB	nickel group		
Group 11	IB	IB	copper group		Sometimes called coinage metals, but the set is arbitrary^{f}
Group 12	IIB	IIB	zinc group		volatile metals
Group 13	IIIB	IIIA	boron group	triels^{b}	icosagens earth metals
Group 14	IVB	IVA	carbon group	tetrels^{c}	crystallogens adamantogens merylides
Group 15	VB	VA	nitrogen group	pnictogens pentels^{n}	
Group 16	VIB	VIA	oxygen group	chalcogens	
Group 17	VIIB	VIIA	fluorine group	halogens	
Group 18	0	VIIIA	helium group or neon group	noble gases	aerogens

^f Coinage metals: authors differ on whether roentgenium (Rg) is considered a coinage metal. It is in group 11, like the other coinage metals, and is expected to be chemically similar to gold. On the other hand, being extremely radioactive and short-lived, it cannot actually be used for coinage as the name suggests, and on that basis it is sometimes excluded.

^b triels (group 13), from Greek tri: three, III
^c tetrels (group 14), from Greek tetra: four, IV
^n pentel (group 15), from Greek penta: five, V

== CAS and old IUPAC numbering (A/B) ==
Two earlier group number systems exist: CAS (Chemical Abstracts Service) and old IUPAC. Both use numerals (Arabic or Roman) and letters A and B. Both systems agree on the numbers. The numbers indicate approximately the highest oxidation number of the elements in that group, and so indicate similar chemistry with other elements with the same numeral. The number proceeds in a linearly increasing fashion for the most part, once on the left of the table, and once on the right (see List of oxidation states of the elements), with some irregularities in the transition metals. However, the two systems use the letters differently. For example, potassium (K) has one valence electron. Therefore, it is located in group 1. Calcium (Ca) is in group 2, for it contains two valence electrons.

In the old IUPAC system the letters A and B were designated to the left (A) and right (B) part of the table, while in the CAS system the letters A and B are designated to main group elements (A) and transition elements (B). The old IUPAC system was frequently used in Europe, while the CAS is most common in America. The new IUPAC scheme was developed to replace both systems as they confusingly used the same names to mean different things. The new system simply numbers the groups increasingly from left to right on the standard periodic table. The IUPAC proposal was first circulated in 1985 for public comments, and was later included as part of the 1990 edition of the Nomenclature of Inorganic Chemistry.

== Non-columnwise groups ==
While groups are defined to be columns in the periodic table, as described above, there are also sets of elements named "group" that are not a column:

Similar sets: noble metals, coinage metals, precious metals, refractory metals.
