= Robert Thomas Sanderson =

American inorganic chemist

R. T. Sanderson
- Born: 1912
- Died: 1989 (aged 76–77)
- Education: University of Chicago
- Known for: Electronegativity equalization
- Scientific career
- Fields: Inorganic chemistry

Robert Thomas Sanderson (1912–1989) was an American inorganic chemist, more commonly known by the initials "R.T." found in his papers. He received his Ph.D. degree from the University of Chicago for his research in boron chemistry. After working in Texaco's research lab, he became a professor and spent his career on the faculties of the University of Florida, the University of Iowa, and Arizona State University. He also created a company supplying safety posters and lab-related artwork of his own design, and published several books including Vacuum Manipulation of Volatile Compounds.

== Electronegativity equalization ==
In 1951, Sanderson developed the idea of electronegativity equalization, stating two bonding atoms will equalize their Mulliken electronegativity. He would later further revise his own scale of electronegativity to adhere to the 4.00 value of fluorine found in the more common Pauling scale, as well as apply his principle to the calculation of polar covalent bonds, calculating partial charges on a number of polar inorganic compounds. His electronegativity scale was applied to generating reference information like molecular geometry, s-electron energy, and NMR spin-spin constants for organic compounds.

== Electronegativity (Sanderson scale) ==
Electronegativity using the Sanderson scale
| Group → | 1 | 2 | 3 | 4 | 5 | 6 | 7 | 8 | 9 | 10 | 11 | 12 | 13 | 14 | 15 | 16 | 17 | 18 |
↓ Period
| 1 | H 2.592 | | | | | | | | | | | | | | | | | He |
| 2 | Li; 0.670 | Be Ⅰ1.56 Ⅱ1.81 | | | | | | | | | | | B Ⅰ1.53 Ⅱ2.19 Ⅲ2.28 | C 2.746 | N 3.194 | O 3.654 | F 4.000 | Ne; 4.50 |
| 3 | Na; 0.560 | Mg; 1.318 | | | | | | | | | | | Al Ⅰ0.84 Ⅱ1.63 Ⅲ1.71 | Si Ⅰ2.08 Ⅲ1.99 Ⅳ2.14 | P 2.515 | S 2.957 | Cl; 3.475 | Ar; 3.31 |
| 4 | K 0.445 | Ca Ⅰ1.13 Ⅱ0.95 | Sc Ⅱ0.64 Ⅲ1.02 | Ti Ⅱ0.73 Ⅲ1.09 Ⅳ1.50 | V Ⅱ0.69 Ⅲ1.39 Ⅳ1.89 Ⅴ2.51 | Cr Ⅱ1.24 Ⅲ1.66 Ⅳ2.29 Ⅴ2.83 Ⅵ3.37 | Mn Ⅱ1.66 Ⅲ2.20 Ⅳ2.74 Ⅴ3.28 Ⅵ3.82 Ⅶ4.36 | Fe Ⅱ1.64 Ⅲ2.20 | Co Ⅱ1.96 Ⅲ2.56 Ⅳ3.10 | Ni Ⅱ1.94 Ⅲ2.73 Ⅳ3.27 Ⅴ3.81 | Cu; 2.03 Ⅱ1.98 | Zn; 2.223 | Ga Ⅰ0.86 Ⅲ2.42 | Ge Ⅱ0.56 Ⅳ2.62 | As; 2.816 | Se; 3.014 | Br; 3.219 | Kr; 2.91 |
| 5 | Rb; 0.312 | Sr; 0.721 | Y Ⅱ0.40 Ⅲ0.65 | Zr Ⅱ0.52 Ⅲ0.79 Ⅳ0.90 | Nb Ⅱ0.77 Ⅲ1.02 Ⅳ1.25 Ⅴ1.42 | Mo Ⅱ0.90 Ⅲ1.15 Ⅳ1.40 Ⅴ1.73 Ⅵ2.20 | Tc | Ru | Rh | Pd | Ag; 1.826 | Cd Ⅰ0.71 Ⅱ1.97 | In; 2.138 | Sn Ⅱ1.49 Ⅳ2.30 | Sb; 2.458 | Te; 2.618 | I 2.778 | Xe; 2.34 |
| 6 | Cs; 0.220 | Ba; 0.651 | 1 asterisk | Hf Ⅱ0.31 Ⅲ0.56 Ⅳ0.81 | Ta Ⅱ0.44 Ⅲ0.69 Ⅳ0.94 Ⅴ1.17 | W Ⅱ0.73 Ⅲ0.98 Ⅳ1.23 Ⅴ1.48 Ⅵ1.67 | Re | Os | Ir | Pt | Au | Hg; 2.29 2.195 | Tl Ⅰ0.99 Ⅲ2.25 | Pb Ⅱ1.92 Ⅳ2.29 | Bi; 2.342 | Po | At | Rn |
| 7 | Fr | Ra | 2 asterisks | Rf | Db | Sg | Bh | Hs | Mt | Ds | Rg | Cn | Nh | Fl | Mc | Lv | Ts | Og |
| 1 asterisk | | | La; 0.154 | Ce Ⅲ0.203 Ⅳ0.410 | Pr; 0.243 | Nd; 0.284 | Pm; 0.334 | Sm; 0.370 | Eu; 0.405 | Gd; 0.469 | Tb; 0.502 | Dy; 0.565 | Ho; 0.595 | Er; 0.641 | Tm; 0.698 | Yb; 0.739 | Lu; 0.773 |
| 2 asterisks | | | Ac | Th | Pa | U | Np | Pu | Am | Cm | Bk | Cf | Es | Fm | Md | No | Lr |
See also: Electronegativities of the elements (data page)
