= Electronegativity =

Tendency of an atom to attract a shared pair of electrons

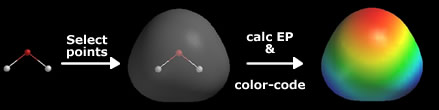
Electrostatic potential map of a water molecule, where the oxygen atom has a more negative charge (red) than the positive (blue) hydrogen atoms

Electronegativity, symbolized as χ, is the tendency for an atom of a given chemical element to attract shared electrons (or electron density) when forming a chemical bond. An atom's electronegativity is affected by both its atomic number and the distance at which its valence electrons reside from the charged nucleus. The higher the associated electronegativity, the more an atom or a substituent group attracts electrons. Electronegativity serves as a simple way to quantitatively estimate the bond energy, and the sign and magnitude of a bond's chemical polarity, which characterizes a bond along the continuous scale from covalent to ionic bonding. The loosely defined term electropositivity is the opposite of electronegativity: it characterizes an element's tendency to donate valence electrons.

On the most basic level, electronegativity is determined by factors like the nuclear charge (the more protons an atom has, the more "pull" it will have on electrons) and the number and location of other electrons in the electron shells (the more electrons an atom has, the farther from the nucleus the valence electrons will be, and as a result, the less positive charge they will experience—both because of their increased distance from the nucleus and because the other electrons in the lower energy core orbitals will act to shield the valence electrons from the positively charged nucleus).

The term "electronegativity" was introduced by Jöns Jacob Berzelius in 1811, though the concept was known before that and was studied by many chemists including Avogadro. Despite its long history, an accurate scale of electronegativity was not developed until 1932, when Linus Pauling proposed an electronegativity scale that depends on bond energies, as a development of valence bond theory. It has been shown to correlate with several other chemical properties. Electronegativity cannot be directly measured and must be calculated from other atomic or molecular properties. Several methods of calculation have been proposed, and although there may be small differences in the numerical values of electronegativity, all methods show the same periodic trends between elements.

The most commonly used method of calculation is that originally proposed by Linus Pauling. This gives a dimensionless quantity, commonly referred to as the Pauling scale (χ_{r}), on a relative scale running from 0.79 to 3.98 (hydrogen = 2.20). When other methods of calculation are used, it is conventional (although not obligatory) to quote the results on a scale that covers the same range of numerical values: this is known as electronegativity in Pauling units.

As it is usually calculated, electronegativity is not a property of an atom alone, but rather a property of an atom in a molecule. Even so, the electronegativity of an atom is strongly correlated with the first ionization energy. The electronegativity is slightly negatively correlated (for smaller electronegativity values) and rather strongly positively correlated (for most and larger electronegativity values) with the electron affinity. It is to be expected that the electronegativity of an element will vary with its chemical environment, but it is usually considered to be a transferable property, that is to say, that similar values will be valid in a variety of situations.

By Pauling scale, caesium is the least electronegative element (0.79); fluorine is the most (3.98).

== Methods of calculation ==
=== Pauling electronegativity ===
Pauling first proposed the concept of electronegativity in 1932 to explain why the covalent bond between two different atoms (A–B) is stronger than the average of the A–A and the B–B bonds. According to valence bond theory, of which Pauling was a notable proponent, this "additional stabilization" of the heteronuclear bond is due to the contribution of ionic canonical forms to the bonding.

The difference in electronegativity between atoms A and B is given by:
$$|\chi_{\rm A} - \chi_{\rm B}| = ({\rm eV})^{-1/2} \sqrt{E_{\rm d}({\rm AB}) - \frac{E_{\rm d}({\rm AA}) + E_{\rm d}({\rm BB})} 2}$$
where the dissociation energies, E_{d}, of the A–B, A–A and B–B bonds are expressed in electronvolts, the factor (eV)^{−1/2} being included to ensure a dimensionless result. Hence, the difference in Pauling electronegativity between hydrogen and bromine is 0.73 (dissociation energies: H–Br, 3.79 eV; H–H, 4.52 eV; Br–Br 2.00 eV)

As only differences in electronegativity are defined, it is necessary to choose an arbitrary reference point to construct a scale. Hydrogen was chosen as the reference, as it forms covalent bonds with a large variety of elements: its electronegativity was fixed first at 0, then in his famous book at 2.1 to avoid negative electronegativity figures, later revised to 2.20 by Allred. It is also necessary to decide which of the two elements is the more electronegative (equivalent to choosing one of the two possible signs for the square root). This is usually done using "chemical intuition": in the above example, hydrogen bromide dissolves in water to form H^{+} and Br^{−} ions, so it may be assumed that bromine is more electronegative than hydrogen. However, in principle, since the same electronegativities should be obtained for any two bonding compounds, the data are overdetermined, and the signs are unique once a reference point has been fixed (usually, for H or F).

To calculate Pauling electronegativity for an element, it is necessary to have data on the dissociation energies of at least two types of covalent bonds formed by that element. A. L. Allred updated Pauling's original values in 1961 to take account of the greater availability of thermodynamic data, and it is these "revised Pauling" values of the electronegativity that are most often used.

The essential point of Pauling electronegativity is that there is an underlying, quite accurate, semi-empirical formula for dissociation energies, namely:
$$E_{\rm d}({\rm AB}) = \frac{E_{\rm d}({\rm AA}) + E_{\rm d}({\rm BB})} 2 + (\chi_{\rm A} - \chi_{\rm B})^2 {\rm eV}$$
or sometimes, a more accurate fit
$$E_{\rm d}({\rm AB}) =\sqrt{E_{\rm d}({\rm AA}) E_{\rm d}({\rm BB})}+1.3(\chi_{\rm A} - \chi_{\rm B})^2 {\rm eV}$$

These are approximate equations but they hold with good accuracy. Pauling obtained the first equation by noting that a bond can be approximately represented as a quantum mechanical superposition of a covalent bond and two ionic bond states. The covalent energy of a bond is approximately, by quantum mechanical calculations, the geometric mean of the two energies of covalent bonds of the same molecules, and there is additional energy that comes from ionic factors, i.e. polar character of the bond.

The geometric mean is approximately equal to the arithmetic mean—which is applied in the first formula above—when the energies are of a similar value, e.g., except for the highly electropositive elements, where there is a larger difference of two dissociation energies; the geometric mean is more accurate and almost always gives positive excess energy, due to ionic bonding. The square root of this excess energy, Pauling notes, is approximately additive, and hence one can introduce the electronegativity. Thus, it is these semi-empirical formulas for bond energy that underlie the concept of Pauling electronegativity.

The formulas are approximate, but this rough approximation is good and gives the right intuition, with the notion of the polarity of the bond and some theoretical grounding in quantum mechanics. The electronegativities are then determined to best fit the data.

In more complex compounds, there is an additional error since electronegativity depends on the molecular environment of an atom. Also, the energy estimate can be only used for single, not for multiple bonds. The enthalpy of formation of a molecule containing only single bonds can subsequently be estimated based on an electronegativity table, and it depends on the constituents and the sum of squares of differences of electronegativities of all pairs of bonded atoms. Such a formula for estimating energy typically has a relative error on the order of 10% but can be used to get a rough qualitative idea and understanding of a molecule.

Periodic table of electronegativity by Pauling scale
→ Atomic radius decreases → Ionization energy increases → Electronegativity increases →

| | 1 | 2 | | 3 | 4 | 5 | 6 | 7 | 8 | 9 | 10 | 11 | 12 | 13 | 14 | 15 | 16 | 17 | 18 |
Group →
↓ Period
| 1 | H 2.20 | | | | | | | | | | | | | | | | | | He |
| 2 | Li; 0.98 | Be; 1.57 | | | | | | | | | | | | B 2.04 | C 2.55 | N 3.04 | O 3.44 | F 3.98 | Ne |
| 3 | Na; 0.93 | Mg; 1.31 | | | | | | | | | | | | Al; 1.61 | Si; 1.90 | P 2.19 | S 2.58 | Cl; 3.16 | Ar |
| 4 | K 0.82 | Ca; 1.00 | | Sc; 1.36 | Ti; 1.54 | V 1.63 | Cr; 1.66 | Mn; 1.55 | Fe; 1.83 | Co; 1.88 | Ni; 1.91 | Cu; 1.90 | Zn; 1.65 | Ga; 1.81 | Ge; 2.01 | As; 2.18 | Se; 2.55 | Br; 2.96 | Kr; 3.00 |
| 5 | Rb; 0.82 | Sr; 0.95 | | Y 1.22 | Zr; 1.33 | Nb; 1.6 | Mo; 2.16 | Tc; 1.9 | Ru; 2.2 | Rh; 2.28 | Pd; 2.20 | Ag; 1.93 | Cd; 1.69 | In; 1.78 | Sn; 1.96 | Sb; 2.05 | Te; 2.1 | I 2.66 | Xe; 2.60 |
| 6 | Cs; 0.79 | Ba; 0.89 | 1 asterisk | Lu; 1.27 | Hf; 1.3 | Ta; 1.5 | W 2.36 | Re; 1.9 | Os; 2.2 | Ir; 2.20 | Pt; 2.28 | Au; 2.54 | Hg; 2.00 | Tl; 1.62 | Pb; 2.33 | Bi; 2.02 | Po; 2.0 | At; 2.2 | Rn |
| 7 | Fr >0.79 (Note: The electronegativity of francium was chosen by Pauling as 0.7, close to that of caesium (also assessed 0.7 at that point). The base value of hydrogen was later increased by 0.10 and caesium's electronegativity was later refined to 0.79; however, no refinements have been made for francium as no experiment has been conducted. However, francium is expected and, to a small extent, observed to be more electronegative than caesium. See francium for details.) | Ra; 0.9 | 1 asterisk | Lr; 1.3 (Note: See Brown, Geoffrey (2012). The Inaccessible Earth: An integrated view to its structure and composition. Springer Science & Business Media. p. 88. ISBN 9789401115162.) | Rf | Db | Sg | Bh | Hs | Mt | Ds | Rg | Cn | Nh | Fl | Mc | Lv | Ts | Og |
| 1 asterisk | | | | La; 1.1 | Ce; 1.12 | Pr; 1.13 | Nd; 1.14 | Pm – | Sm; 1.17 | Eu – | Gd; 1.2 | Tb; 1.21 | Dy; 1.22 | Ho; 1.23 | Er; 1.24 | Tm; 1.25 | Yb – |
| 1 asterisk | | | | Ac; 1.1 | Th; 1.3 | Pa; 1.5 | U 1.38 | Np; 1.36 | Pu; 1.28 | Am; 1.3 | Cm; 1.28 | Bk; 1.3 | Cf; 1.3 | Es; 1.3 | Fm; 1.3 | Md; 1.3 | No; 1.3 |

See also: Electronegativities of the elements (data page)
There are no reliable sources for Pm, Eu and Yb other than the range of 1.1–1.2; see Pauling, Linus (1960). The Nature of the Chemical Bond. 3rd ed., Cornell University Press, p. 93.

=== Mulliken electronegativity ===
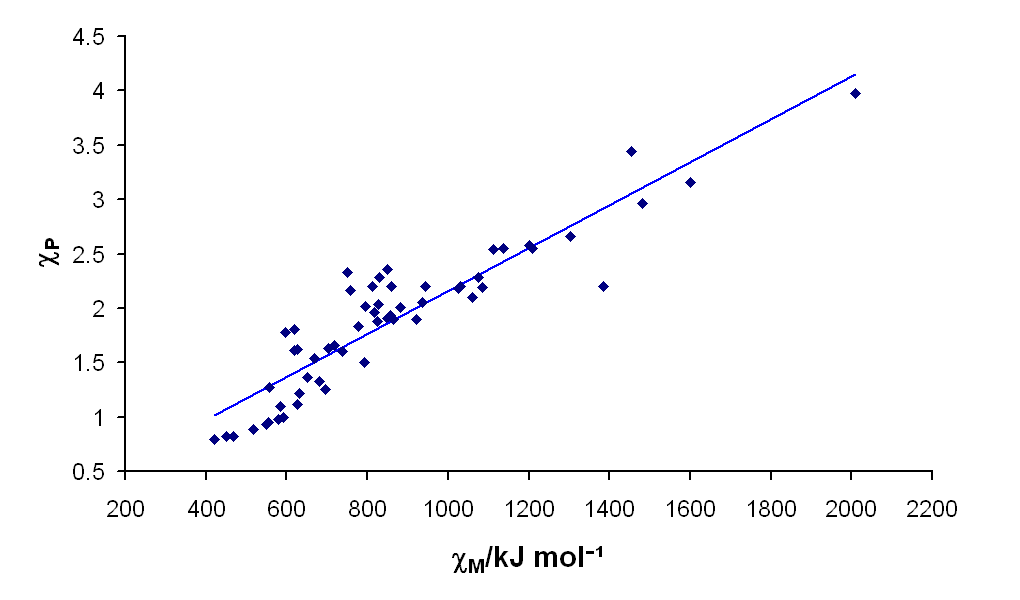
The correlation between Mulliken electronegativities (x-axis, in kJ/mol) and Pauling electronegativities (y-axis).

Robert S. Mulliken proposed that the arithmetic mean of the first ionization energy (E_{i}) and the electron affinity (E_{ea}) should be a measure of the tendency of an atom to attract electrons:
$$\chi = \frac{E_{\rm i} + E_{\rm ea}} 2$$

As this definition is not dependent on an arbitrary relative scale, it has also been termed absolute electronegativity, with the units of kilojoules per mole or electronvolts. However, it is more usual to use a linear transformation to transform these absolute values into values that resemble the more familiar Pauling values. For ionization energies and electron affinities in electronvolts,
$$\chi = 0.187(E_{\rm i} + E_{\rm ea}) + 0.17 \,$$
and for energies in kilojoules per mole,
$$\chi = (1.97\times 10^{-3})(E_{\rm i} + E_{\rm ea}) + 0.19.$$

The Mulliken electronegativity can only be calculated for an element whose electron affinity is known. Measured values are available for 72 elements, while approximate values have been estimated or calculated for the remaining elements.

The Mulliken electronegativity of an atom is sometimes said to be the negative of the chemical potential. By inserting the energetic definitions of the ionization potential and electron affinity into the Mulliken electronegativity, it is possible to show that the Mulliken chemical potential is a finite difference approximation of the electronic energy with respect to the number of electrons., i.e.,
$$\mu(\rm Mulliken) = -\chi(\rm Mulliken) = {}-\frac{E_{\rm i} + E_{\rm ea}} 2$$

=== Allred–Rochow electronegativity ===
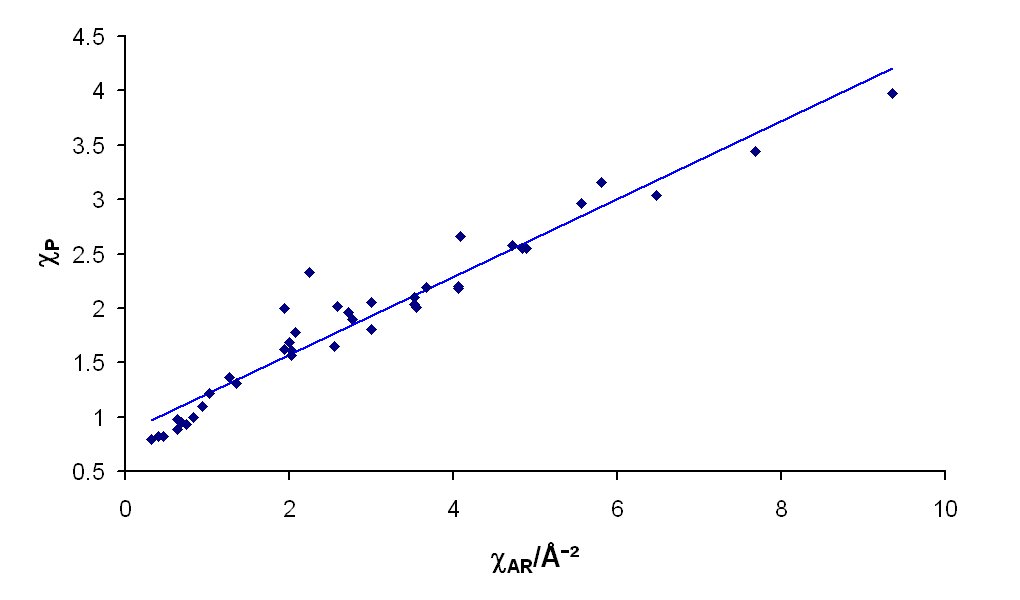
The correlation between Allred–Rochow electronegativities (x-axis, in Å^{−2}) and Pauling electronegativities (y-axis).

A. Louis Allred and Eugene G. Rochow considered that electronegativity should be related to the charge experienced by an electron on the "surface" of an atom: The higher the charge per unit area of atomic surface the greater the tendency of that atom to attract electrons. The effective nuclear charge, Z_{eff}, experienced by valence electrons can be estimated using Slater's rules, while the surface area of an atom in a molecule can be taken to be proportional to the square of the covalent radius, r_{cov}. When r_{cov} is expressed in picometres,
$$\chi = 3590{{Z_{\rm eff}}\over{r^2_{\rm cov}}} + 0.744$$

=== Sanderson electronegativity equalization ===
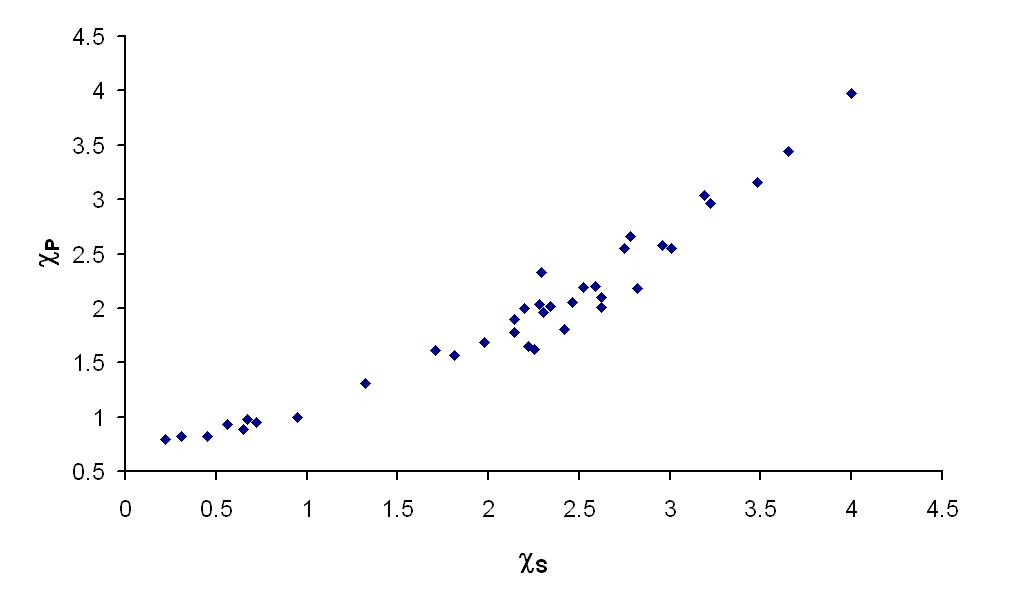
The correlation between Sanderson electronegativities (x-axis, arbitrary units) and Pauling electronegativities (y-axis).

R.T. Sanderson has also noted the relationship between Mulliken electronegativity and atomic size and has proposed a method of calculation based on the reciprocal of the atomic volume. With a knowledge of bond lengths, Sanderson's model allows the estimation of bond energies in a wide range of compounds. Sanderson's model has also been used to calculate molecular geometry, s-electron energy, NMR spin-spin coupling constants and other parameters for organic compounds. This work underlies the concept of electronegativity equalization, which suggests that electrons distribute themselves around a molecule to minimize or equalize the Mulliken electronegativity. This behavior is analogous to the equalization of chemical potential in macroscopic thermodynamics.

=== Allen electronegativity ===
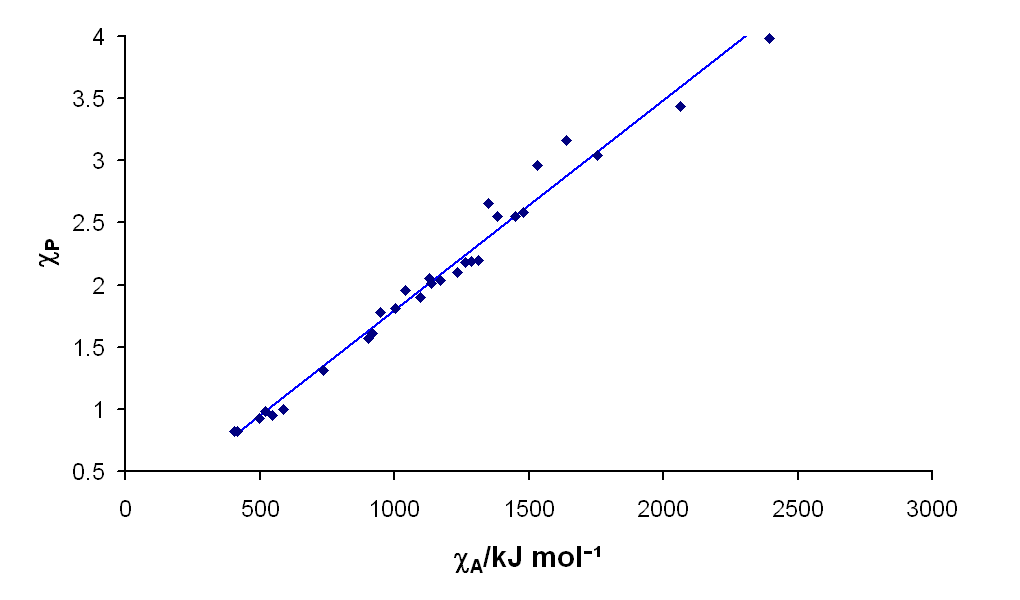
The correlation between Allen electronegativities (x-axis, in kJ/mol) and Pauling electronegativities (y-axis).

Perhaps the simplest definition of electronegativity is that of Leland C. Allen, who has proposed that it is related to the average energy of the valence electrons in a free atom,

$$\chi = {n_{\rm s}\varepsilon_{\rm s} + n_{\rm p}\varepsilon_{\rm p} \over n_{\rm s} + n_{\rm p}}$$

where ε_{s,p} are the one-electron energies of s- and p-electrons in the free atom and n_{s,p} are the number of s- and p-electrons in the valence shell.

The one-electron energies can be determined directly from spectroscopic data, and so electronegativities calculated by this method are sometimes referred to as spectroscopic electronegativities. These energies are obtained by averaging the energies of all spectroscopic terms, weighed according to the S, L and J quantum numbers. Unfortunately, for the transition metals and the lanthanides the spectroscopic energies of many terms are unknown since their energies overlap or have not been recorded and assigned yet. Therefore, Allen lists no electronegativities for the lanthanides and employed theoretical methods to estimate the electronegativities of the listed transition metals. The necessary data are available for most of the main group elements, and this method allows the estimation of electronegativities for elements that cannot be treated by the other methods, e.g. francium, which has an Allen electronegativity of 0.67. However, it is not clear what should be considered to be valence electrons for the d- and f-block elements, which leads to an ambiguity regarding their electronegativities calculated by the Allen method.

On this scale, neon has the highest electronegativity of all elements, followed by fluorine, helium, and oxygen.

Electronegativity using the Allen scale
| Group → | 1 | 2 | 3 | 4 | 5 | 6 | 7 | 8 | 9 | 10 | 11 | 12 | 13 | 14 | 15 | 16 | 17 | 18 |
↓ Period
| 1 | H 2.300 | | | | | | | | | | | | | | | | | He; 4.160 |
| 2 | Li; 0.912 | Be; 1.576 | | | | | | | | | | | B 2.051 | C 2.544 | N 3.066 | O 3.610 | F 4.193 | Ne; 4.787 |
| 3 | Na; 0.869 | Mg; 1.293 | | | | | | | | | | | Al; 1.613 | Si; 1.916 | P 2.253 | S 2.589 | Cl; 2.869 | Ar; 3.242 |
| 4 | K 0.734 | Ca; 1.034 | Sc; 1.19 | Ti; 1.38 | V 1.53 | Cr; 1.65 | Mn; 1.75 | Fe; 1.80 | Co; 1.84 | Ni; 1.88 | Cu; 1.85 | Zn; 1.588 | Ga; 1.756 | Ge; 1.994 | As; 2.211 | Se; 2.424 | Br; 2.685 | Kr; 2.966 |
| 5 | Rb; 0.706 | Sr; 0.963 | Y 1.12 | Zr; 1.32 | Nb; 1.41 | Mo; 1.47 | Tc; 1.51 | Ru; 1.54 | Rh; 1.56 | Pd; 1.58 | Ag; 1.87 | Cd; 1.521 | In; 1.656 | Sn; 1.824 | Sb; 1.984 | Te; 2.158 | I 2.359 | Xe; 2.582 |
| 6 | Cs; 0.659 | Ba; 0.881 | Lu; 1.09 | Hf; 1.16 | Ta; 1.34 | W 1.47 | Re; 1.60 | Os; 1.65 | Ir; 1.68 | Pt; 1.72 | Au; 1.92 | Hg; 1.765 | Tl; 1.789 | Pb; 1.854 | Bi; 2.01 | Po; 2.19 | At; 2.39 | Rn; 2.60 |
| 7 | Fr; 0.67 | Ra; 0.89 |
See also: Electronegativities of the elements (data page)

== Correlation of electronegativity with other properties ==
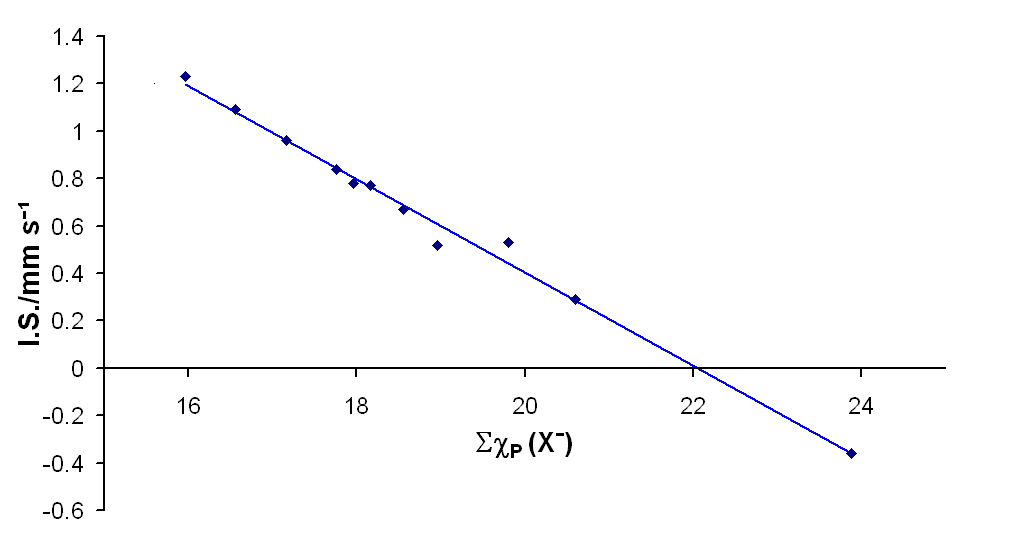
The variation of the isomer shift (y-axis, in mm/s) of [SnX_{6}]^{2−} anions, as measured by ^{119}Sn Mössbauer spectroscopy, against the sum of the Pauling electronegativities of the halide substituents (x-axis).

The wide variety of methods of calculation of electronegativities, which all give results that correlate well with one another, is one indication of the number of chemical properties that might be affected by electronegativity. The most obvious application of electronegativities is in the discussion of bond polarity, for which the concept was introduced by Pauling. In general, the greater the difference in electronegativity between two atoms the more polar the bond that will be formed between them, with the atom having the higher electronegativity being at the negative end of the dipole. Pauling proposed an equation to relate the "ionic character" of a bond to the difference in electronegativity of the two atoms, although this has fallen somewhat into disuse.

Several correlations have been shown between infrared stretching frequencies of certain bonds and the electronegativities of the atoms involved: However, this is not surprising as such stretching frequencies depend in part on bond strength, which enters into the calculation of Pauling electronegativities. More convincing are the correlations between electronegativity and chemical shifts in NMR spectroscopy or isomer shifts in Mössbauer spectroscopy (see figure). Both these measurements depend on the s-electron density at the nucleus, and so is a good indication that the different measures of electronegativity describe "the ability of an atom in a molecule to attract electrons to itself".

== Trends in electronegativity ==
=== Periodic trends ===
The variation of Pauling electronegativity (y-axis) as one descends the main groups of the periodic table from the second period to the sixth period

In general, electronegativity increases on passing from left to right along a period and decreases on descending a group. Hence, fluorine is the most electronegative of the elements (not counting noble gases), whereas caesium is the least electronegative, at least of those elements for which substantial data is available.

There are some exceptions to this general rule. Gallium and germanium have higher electronegativities than aluminium and silicon, respectively, because of the d-block contraction. Elements of the fourth period immediately after the first row of the transition metals have unusually small atomic radii because the 3d-electrons are not effective at shielding the increased nuclear charge, and smaller atomic size correlates with higher electronegativity (see Allred-Rochow electronegativity and Sanderson electronegativity above). The anomalously high electronegativity of lead, in particular, when compared to thallium and bismuth, is an artifact of electronegativity varying with oxidation state: its electronegativity conforms better to trends if it is quoted for the +2 state with a Pauling value of 1.87 instead of the +4 state.

=== Variation of electronegativity with oxidation number ===
In inorganic chemistry, it is common to consider a single value of electronegativity to be valid for most "normal" situations. While this approach has the advantage of simplicity, it is clear that the electronegativity of an element is not an invariable atomic property and, in particular, increases with the oxidation state of the element.

Allred used the Pauling method to calculate separate electronegativities for different oxidation states of the handful of elements (including tin and lead) for which sufficient data were available. However, for most elements, there are not enough different covalent compounds for which bond dissociation energies are known to make this approach feasible.

| Acid | Formula | Chlorine oxidation state | pK_{a} |
|---|---|---|---|
| Hypochlorous acid | HClO | +1 | +7.5 |
| Chlorous acid | HClO_{2} | +3 | +2.0 |
| Chloric acid | HClO_{3} | +5 | −1.0 |
| Perchloric acid | HClO_{4} | +7 | −10 |

The chemical effects of this increase in electronegativity can be seen both in the structures of oxides and halides and in the acidity of oxides and oxoacids. Hence CrO_{3} and Mn_{2}O_{7} are acidic oxides with low melting points, while Cr_{2}O_{3} is amphoteric and Mn_{2}O_{3} is a completely basic oxide.

The effect can also be seen in the dissociation constants pK_{a} of the oxoacids of chlorine. The effect is much larger than could be explained by the negative charge being shared among a larger number of oxygen atoms, which would lead to a difference in pK_{a} of log_{10}(1/4) = −0.6 between hypochlorous acid and perchloric acid. As the oxidation state of the central chlorine atom increases, more electron density is drawn from the oxygen atoms onto the chlorine, diminishing the partial negative charge of individual oxygen atoms. At the same time, the positive partial charge on the hydrogen increases with a higher oxidation state. This explains the observed increased acidity with an increasing oxidation state in the oxoacids of chlorine.

=== Electronegativity and hybridization scheme ===
The electronegativity of an atom changes depending on the hybridization of the orbital employed in bonding. Electrons in s orbitals are held more tightly than electrons in p orbitals. Hence, a bond to an atom that employs an sp^{x} hybrid orbital for bonding will be more heavily polarized to that atom when the hybrid orbital has more s character. That is, when electronegativities are compared for different hybridization schemes of a given element, the order χ(sp^{3}) < χ(sp^{2}) < χ(sp) holds (the trend should apply to non-integer hybridization indices as well).

| Hybridization | χ (Pauling) |
|---|---|
| C(sp^{3}) | 2.3 |
| C(sp^{2}) | 2.6 |
| C(sp) | 3.1 |
| 'generic' C | 2.5 |

== Group electronegativity ==
In organic chemistry, electronegativity is associated more with different functional groups than with individual atoms. The terms group electronegativity and substituent electronegativity are used synonymously. However, it is common to distinguish between the inductive effect and the resonance effect, which might be described as σ- and π-electronegativities, respectively. There are several linear free-energy relationships that have been used to quantify these effects, of which the Hammett equation is the best known. Kabachnik parameters are group electronegativities for use in organophosphorus chemistry.

== Electropositivity ==
Electropositivity is a measure of an element's ability to donate electrons, and therefore form positive ions; thus, it is antipode to electronegativity.

Mainly, this is an attribute of metals, meaning that, in general, the greater the metallic character of an element the greater the electropositivity. Therefore, the alkali metals are the most electropositive of all. This is because they have a single electron in their outer shell and, as this is relatively far from the nucleus of the atom, it is easily lost; in other words, these metals have low ionization energies.

While electronegativity increases along periods in the periodic table and decreases down groups, electropositivity decreases along periods (from left to right) and increases down groups. This means that elements in the upper right of the periodic table of elements (oxygen, sulfur, chlorine, etc.) will have the greatest electronegativity, and those in the lower left (rubidium, caesium, and francium) the greatest electropositivity.

== See also ==
- Chemical polarity
- Electron affinity
- Electronegativities of the elements (data page)
- Ionization energy
- Metallic bonding
- Miedema's model
- Orbital hybridization
- Oxidation state
- Periodic table

== Bibliography ==
- Jolly, William L. (1991). Modern Inorganic Chemistry (2nd ed.). New York: McGraw-Hill. pp. 71–76. ISBN 978-0-07-112651-9.
- Mullay, J. (1987). "Estimation of atomic and group electronegativities". Electronegativity. Structure and Bonding. Vol. 66. pp. 1–25. doi:10.1007/BFb0029834. ISBN 978-3-540-17740-1.
