= Electronegativities of the elements (data page) =

== Electronegativity (Pauling scale) ==
Periodic table of electronegativity by Pauling scale
→ Atomic radius decreases → Ionization energy increases → Electronegativity increases →

	1	2		3	4	5	6	7	8	9	10	11	12	13	14	15	16	17	18
Group →
↓ Period
1	H 2.20																		He
2	Li; 0.98	Be; 1.57												B 2.04	C 2.55	N 3.04	O 3.44	F 3.98	Ne
3	Na; 0.93	Mg; 1.31												Al; 1.61	Si; 1.90	P 2.19	S 2.58	Cl; 3.16	Ar
4	K 0.82	Ca; 1.00		Sc; 1.36	Ti; 1.54	V 1.63	Cr; 1.66	Mn; 1.55	Fe; 1.83	Co; 1.88	Ni; 1.91	Cu; 1.90	Zn; 1.65	Ga; 1.81	Ge; 2.01	As; 2.18	Se; 2.55	Br; 2.96	Kr; 3.00
5	Rb; 0.82	Sr; 0.95		Y 1.22	Zr; 1.33	Nb; 1.6	Mo; 2.16	Tc; 1.9	Ru; 2.2	Rh; 2.28	Pd; 2.20	Ag; 1.93	Cd; 1.69	In; 1.78	Sn; 1.96	Sb; 2.05	Te; 2.1	I 2.66	Xe; 2.60
6	Cs; 0.79	Ba; 0.89	1 asterisk	Lu; 1.27	Hf; 1.3	Ta; 1.5	W 2.36	Re; 1.9	Os; 2.2	Ir; 2.20	Pt; 2.28	Au; 2.54	Hg; 2.00	Tl; 1.62	Pb; 1.87	Bi; 2.02	Po; 2.0	At; 2.2	Rn; 2.2
7	Fr >0.79 (Note: The electronegativity of francium was chosen by Pauling as 0.7, close to that of caesium (also assessed 0.7 at that point). The base value of hydrogen was later increased by 0.10 and caesium's electronegativity was later refined to 0.79; however, no refinements have been made for francium as no experiment has been conducted. However, francium is expected and, to a small extent, observed to be more electronegative than caesium. See francium for details.)	Ra; 0.9	1 asterisk	Lr; 1.3 (Note: See Brown, Geoffrey (2012). The Inaccessible Earth: An integrated view to its structure and composition. Springer Science & Business Media. p. 88. ISBN 9789401115162.)	Rf	Db	Sg	Bh	Hs	Mt	Ds	Rg	Cn	Nh	Fl	Mc	Lv	Ts	Og
1 asterisk				La; 1.1	Ce; 1.12	Pr; 1.13	Nd; 1.14	Pm –	Sm; 1.17	Eu –	Gd; 1.2	Tb; 1.21	Dy; 1.22	Ho; 1.23	Er; 1.24	Tm; 1.25	Yb –
1 asterisk				Ac; 1.1	Th; 1.3	Pa; 1.5	U 1.38	Np; 1.36	Pu; 1.28	Am; 1.3	Cm; 1.28	Bk; 1.3	Cf; 1.3	Es; 1.3	Fm; 1.3	Md; 1.3	No; 1.3

See also: Electronegativities of the elements (data page)
There are no reliable sources for Pm, Eu and Yb other than the range of 1.1–1.2; see Pauling, Linus (1960). The Nature of the Chemical Bond. 3rd ed., Cornell University Press, p. 93.

Data table: electronegativities of the elements
Number	Symbol	Name	electronegativity	WEL	CRC	Lange
1	H	hydrogen	2.20	same		
2	He	helium	no data	same		
3	Li	lithium	0.98	same		
4	Be	beryllium	1.57	same		
5	B	boron	2.04	same		
6	C	carbon	2.55	same		
7	N	nitrogen	3.04	same		
8	O	oxygen	3.44	same		
9	F	fluorine	3.98	3.98	3.98	3.90
10	Ne	neon	no data	same		
11	Na	sodium	0.93	same		
12	Mg	magnesium	1.31	same		
13	Al	aluminium	1.61	same		
14	Si	silicon	1.90	same		
15	P	phosphorus	2.19	same		
16	S	sulfur	2.58	same		
17	Cl	chlorine	3.16	same		
18	Ar	argon	no data	same		
19	K	potassium	0.82	same		
20	Ca	calcium	1.00	same		
21	Sc	scandium	1.36	same		
22	Ti	titanium	1.54	same		
23	V	vanadium	1.63	same		
24	Cr	chromium	1.66	same		
25	Mn	manganese	1.55	same		
26	Fe	iron	1.83	same		
27	Co	cobalt	1.88	same		
28	Ni	nickel	1.91	same		
29	Cu	copper	1.90	same		
30	Zn	zinc	1.65	same		
31	Ga	gallium	1.81	same		
32	Ge	germanium	2.01	same		
33	As	arsenic	2.18	same		
34	Se	selenium	2.55	same		
35	Br	bromine	2.96	same		
36	Kr	krypton	3.00	3.00	no data	no data
37	Rb	rubidium	0.82	same		
38	Sr	strontium	0.95	same		
39	Y	yttrium	1.22	same		
40	Zr	zirconium	1.33	same		
41	Nb	niobium	1.6	same		
42	Mo	molybdenum	2.16	same		
43	Tc	technetium	1.9	1.9	2.10	2.10
44	Ru	ruthenium	2.2	same		
45	Rh	rhodium	2.28	same		
46	Pd	palladium	2.20	same		
47	Ag	silver	1.93	same		
48	Cd	cadmium	1.69	same		
49	In	indium	1.78	same		
50	Sn	tin	1.96	same		
51	Sb	antimony	2.05	same		
52	Te	tellurium	2.1	same		
53	I	iodine	2.66	same		
54	Xe	xenon	2.6	2.6	2.60	no data
55	Cs	caesium	0.79	same		
56	Ba	barium	0.89	same		
57	La	lanthanum	1.10	same		
58	Ce	cerium	1.12	same		
59	Pr	praseodymium	1.13	same		
60	Nd	neodymium	1.14	same		
61	Pm	promethium(lowest in range)	1.10	same		
61	Pm	promethium(highest in range)	1.20			
62	Sm	samarium	1.17	same		
63	Eu	europium(lowest in range)	1.1	same		
63	Eu	europium(highest in range)	1.2			
64	Gd	gadolinium	1.20	same		
65	Tb	terbium	1.1	same		
66	Dy	dysprosium	1.22	same		
67	Ho	holmium	1.23	same		
68	Er	erbium	1.24	same		
69	Tm	thulium	1.25	same		
70	Yb	ytterbium(lowest in range)	1.1	same		
70	Yb	ytterbium(highest in range)	1.2			
71	Lu	lutetium	1.27	1.27	1.0	1.0
72	Hf	hafnium	1.3	same		
73	Ta	tantalum	1.5	same		
74	W	tungsten	2.36	2.36	1.7	1.7
75	Re	rhenium	1.9	same		
76	Os	osmium	2.2	same		
77	Ir	iridium	2.20	2.20	2.2	2.2
78	Pt	platinum	2.28	2.28	2.2	2.2
79	Au	gold	2.54	2.54	2.4	2.4
80	Hg	mercury	2.00	2.00	1.9	1.9
81	Tl	thallium	1.62	1.62	1.8	1.8
82	Pb	lead	2.33	2.33	1.8	1.8
83	Bi	bismuth	2.02	2.02	1.9	1.9
84	Po	polonium	2.0	same		
85	At	astatine	2.2	same		
86	Rn	radon	no data	same		
87	Fr	francium	no data	0.7		
88	Ra	radium	0.9	same		
89	Ac	actinium	1.1	same		
90	Th	thorium	1.3	same		
91	Pa	protactinium	1.5	same		
92	U	uranium	1.38	1.38	1.7	1.7
93	Np	neptunium	1.36	1.36	1.3	1.3
94	Pu	plutonium	1.28	1.28	1.3	1.3
95	Am	americium	1.3	1.3	no data	1.3
96	Cm	curium	1.3	1.3	no data	1.3
97	Bk	berkelium	1.3	1.3	no data	1.3
98	Cf	californium	1.3	1.3	no data	1.3
99	Es	einsteinium	1.3	1.3	no data	1.3
100	Fm	fermium	1.3	1.3	no data	1.3
101	Md	mendelevium	1.3	1.3	no data	1.3
102	No	nobelium	1.3	1.3	no data	1.3

== Notes ==
- Separate values for each source are only given where one or more sources differ.
- Electronegativity is not a uniquely defined property and may depend on the definition. The suggested values are all taken from WebElements as a consistent set.
- Many of the highly radioactive elements have values that must be predictions or extrapolations, but are unfortunately not marked as such. This is especially problematic for francium, which by relativistic calculations can be shown to be less electronegative than caesium, but for which the only value (0.7) in the literature predates these calculations.

== Electronegativity (Allen scale) ==
Allen electronegativity is related to the average energy of the valence electrons in a free atom. Tabulations of values have been published.

Electronegativity using the Allen scale
Group →	1	2	3	4	5	6	7	8	9	10	11	12	13	14	15	16	17	18
↓ Period
1	H 2.300																	He; 4.160
2	Li; 0.912	Be; 1.576											B 2.051	C 2.544	N 3.066	O 3.610	F 4.193	Ne; 4.787
3	Na; 0.869	Mg; 1.293											Al; 1.613	Si; 1.916	P 2.253	S 2.589	Cl; 2.869	Ar; 3.242
4	K 0.734	Ca; 1.034	Sc; 1.19	Ti; 1.38	V 1.53	Cr; 1.65	Mn; 1.75	Fe; 1.80	Co; 1.84	Ni; 1.88	Cu; 1.85	Zn; 1.588	Ga; 1.756	Ge; 1.994	As; 2.211	Se; 2.424	Br; 2.685	Kr; 2.966
5	Rb; 0.706	Sr; 0.963	Y 1.12	Zr; 1.32	Nb; 1.41	Mo; 1.47	Tc; 1.51	Ru; 1.54	Rh; 1.56	Pd; 1.58	Ag; 1.87	Cd; 1.521	In; 1.656	Sn; 1.824	Sb; 1.984	Te; 2.158	I 2.359	Xe; 2.582
6	Cs; 0.659	Ba; 0.881	Lu; 1.09	Hf; 1.16	Ta; 1.34	W 1.47	Re; 1.60	Os; 1.65	Ir; 1.68	Pt; 1.72	Au; 1.92	Hg; 1.765	Tl; 1.789	Pb; 1.854	Bi; 2.01	Po; 2.19	At; 2.39	Rn; 2.60
7	Fr; 0.67	Ra; 0.89
See also: Electronegativities of the elements (data page)

Number	Symbol	Name	Electronegativity
1	H	hydrogen	2.300
2	He	helium	4.160
3	Li	lithium	0.912
4	Be	beryllium	1.576
5	B	boron	2.051
6	C	carbon	2.544
7	N	nitrogen	3.066
8	O	oxygen	3.610
9	F	fluorine	4.193
10	Ne	neon	4.787
11	Na	sodium	0.869
12	Mg	magnesium	1.293
13	Al	aluminium	1.613
14	Si	silicon	1.916
15	P	phosphorus	2.253
16	S	sulfur	2.589
17	Cl	chlorine	2.869
18	Ar	argon	3.242
19	K	potassium	0.734
20	Ca	calcium	1.034
21	Sc	scandium	1.19
22	Ti	titanium	1.38
23	V	vanadium	1.53
24	Cr	chromium	1.65
25	Mn	manganese	1.75
26	Fe	iron	1.80
27	Co	cobalt	1.84
28	Ni	nickel	1.88
29	Cu	copper	1.85
30	Zn	zinc	1.588
31	Ga	gallium	1.756
32	Ge	germanium	1.994
33	As	arsenic	2.211
34	Se	selenium	2.424
35	Br	bromine	2.685
36	Kr	krypton	2.966
37	Rb	rubidium	0.706
38	Sr	strontium	0.963
39	Y	yttrium	1.12
40	Zr	zirconium	1.32
41	Nb	niobium	1.41
42	Mo	molybdenum	1.47
43	Tc	technetium	1.51
44	Ru	ruthenium	1.54
45	Rh	rhodium	1.56
46	Pd	palladium	1.58
47	Ag	silver	1.87
48	Cd	cadmium	1.521
49	In	indium	1.656
50	Sn	tin	1.824
51	Sb	antimony	1.984
52	Te	tellurium	2.158
53	I	iodine	2.359
54	Xe	xenon	2.582
55	Cs	caesium	0.659
56	Ba	barium	0.881
71	Lu	lutetium	1.09
72	Hf	hafnium	1.16
73	Ta	tantalum	1.34
74	W	tungsten	1.47
75	Re	rhenium	1.60
76	Os	osmium	1.65
77	Ir	iridium	1.68
78	Pt	platinum	1.72
79	Au	gold	1.92
80	Hg	mercury	1.765
81	Tl	thallium	1.789
82	Pb	lead	1.854
83	Bi	bismuth	2.01
84	Po	polonium	2.19
85	At	astatine	2.39
86	Rn	radon	2.60
87	Fr	francium	0.67
88	Ra	radium	0.89

== Electronegativity (ReVEBE scale) ==
The values were published in 2026.

Electronegativity using the ReVEBE scale
Group →	1	2	3	4	5	6	7	8	9	10	11	12	13	14	15	16	17	18
↓ Period
1	H 2.30																	He; 4.16
2	Li; 0.91	Be; 1.58											B 1.93	C 2.36	N 2.85	O 3.14	F 3.93	Ne; 4.79
3	Na; 0.87	Mg; 1.29											Al; 1.54	Si; 1.83	P 2.16	S 2.31	Cl; 2.75	Ar; 3.24
4	K 0.73	Ca; 1.03	Sc; 1.20	Ti; 1.42	V 1.64	Cr; 1.35	Mn; 2.08	Fe; 1.66	Co; 1.87	Ni; 1.92	Cu; 1.65	Zn; 1.59	Ga; 1.68	Ge; 1.88	As; 2.12	Se; 2.24	Br; 2.58	Kr; 2.94
5	Rb; 0.71	Sr; 0.96	Y 1.06	Zr; 1.27	Nb; 1.18	Mo; 1.41	Tc; 1.36	Ru; 1.41	Rh; 1.54	Pd; 1.41	Ag; 1.83	Cd; 1.52	In; 1.57	Sn; 1.73	Sb; 1.89	Te; 2.02	I 2.26	Xe; 2.53
6	Cs; 0.66	Ba; 0.88	Lu; 1.08	Hf; 1.19	Ta; 1.32	W 1.45	Re; 1.53	Os; 1.55	Ir; 1.79	Pt; 1.58	Au; 1.81	Hg; 2.14	Tl; 1.72	Pb; 1.86	Bi; 1.87	Po; 2.19	At; 2.39	Rn; 2.60
7	Fr; 0.69	Ra; 0.89
1 asterisk				La; 1.02	Ce; 1.04	Pr; 0.92	Nd; 0.95	Pm; 0.99	Sm; 1.03	Eu; 1.08	Gd; 1.06	Tb; 1.05	Dy; 1.09	Ho; 1.12	Er; 1.08	Tm; 1.11	Yb; 1.21
1 asterisk				Ac; 0.98	Th; 1.08
See also: Electronegativities of the elements (data page)

Number	Symbol	Name	Electronegativity
1	H	hydrogen	2.30
2	He	helium	4.16
3	Li	lithium	0.91
4	Be	beryllium	1.58
5	B	boron	1.93
6	C	carbon	2.36
7	N	nitrogen	2.85
8	O	oxygen	3.14
9	F	fluorine	3.93
10	Ne	neon	4.79
11	Na	sodium	0.87
12	Mg	magnesium	1.29
13	Al	aluminium	1.54
14	Si	silicon	1.83
15	P	phosphorus	2.16
16	S	sulfur	2.31
17	Cl	chlorine	2.75
18	Ar	argon	3.24
19	K	potassium	0.73
20	Ca	calcium	1.03
21	Sc	scandium	1.20
22	Ti	titanium	1.42
23	V	vanadium	1.64
24	Cr	chromium	1.35
25	Mn	manganese	2.08
26	Fe	iron	1.66
27	Co	cobalt	1.87
28	Ni	nickel	1.92
29	Cu	copper	1.65
30	Zn	zinc	1.59
31	Ga	gallium	1.68
32	Ge	germanium	1.88
33	As	arsenic	2.12
34	Se	selenium	2.24
35	Br	bromine	2.58
36	Kr	krypton	2.94
37	Rb	rubidium	0.71
38	Sr	strontium	0.96
39	Y	yttrium	1.06
40	Zr	zirconium	1.27
41	Nb	niobium	1.18
42	Mo	molybdenum	1.41
43	Tc	technetium	1.36
44	Ru	ruthenium	1.41
45	Rh	rhodium	1.54
46	Pd	palladium	1.41
47	Ag	silver	1.83
48	Cd	cadmium	1.52
49	In	indium	1.57
50	Sn	tin	1.73
51	Sb	antimony	1.89
52	Te	tellurium	2.02
53	I	iodine	2.26
54	Xe	xenon	2.53
55	Cs	caesium	0.66
56	Ba	barium	0.88
57	La	lanthanum	1.02
58	Ce	cerium	1.04
59	Pr	praseodymium	0.92
60	Nd	neodymium	0.95
61	Pm	promethium	0.99
62	Sm	samarium	1.03
63	Eu	europium	1.08
64	Gd	gadolinium	1.06
65	Tb	terbium	1.05
66	Dy	dysprosium	1.09
67	Ho	holmium	1.12
68	Er	erbium	1.08
69	Tm	thulium	1.11
70	Yb	ytterbium	1.21
71	Lu	lutetium	1.08
72	Hf	hafnium	1.19
73	Ta	tantalum	1.32
74	W	tungsten	1.45
75	Re	rhenium	1.53
76	Os	osmium	1.55
77	Ir	iridium	1.79
78	Pt	platinum	1.58
79	Au	gold	1.81
80	Hg	mercury	2.14
81	Tl	thallium	1.72
82	Pb	lead	1.86
83	Bi	bismuth	1.87
84	Po	polonium	2.19
85	At	astatine	2.39
86	Rn	radon	2.60
87	Fr	francium	0.69
88	Ra	radium	0.89
89	Ac	actinium	0.98
90	Th	thorium	1.08
