= Group 9 =

Group 9 may refer to:

- Group 9 element
- Group 9 Rugby League
- "Group 9", Australian arts collective, whose members included John Dowie
