= Eugene G. Rochow =

American inorganic chemist

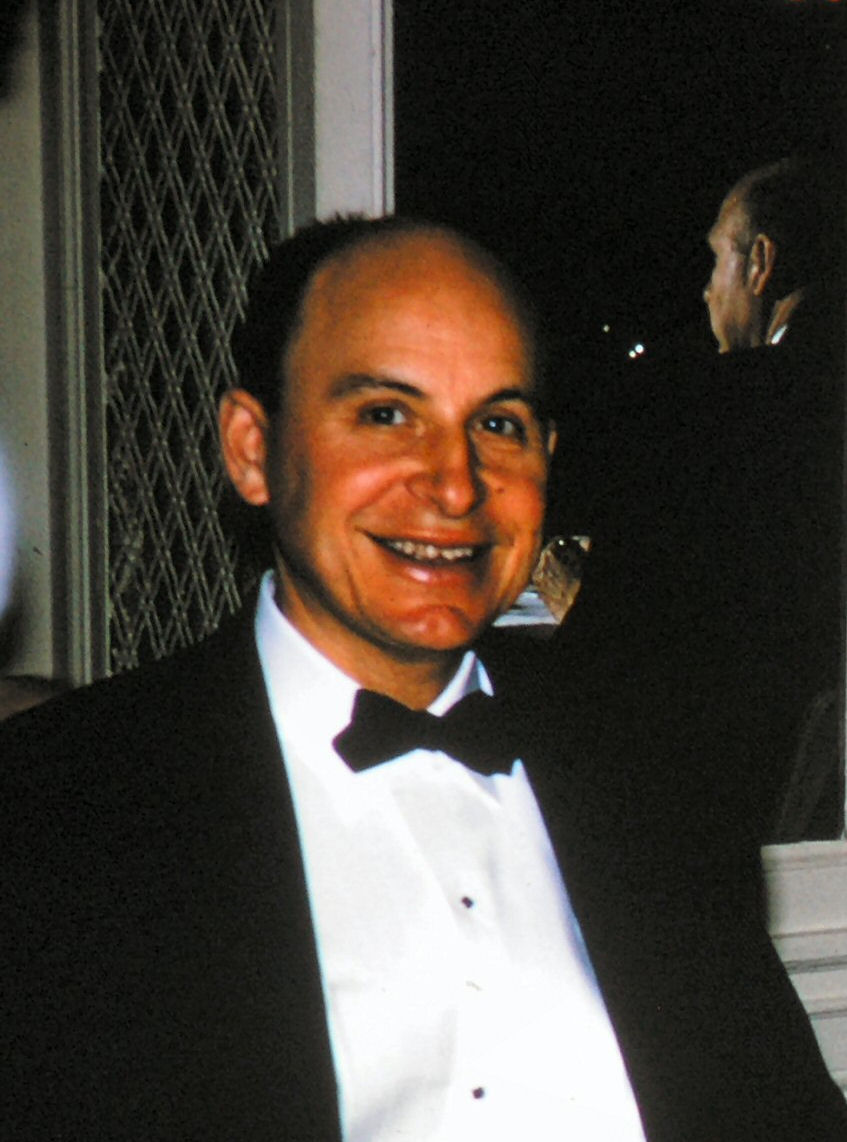
- Rochow in 1965 at the ACS meeting in Detroit
- Born: October 4, 1909
- Died: March 21, 2002 (aged 92)
- Education: Cornell University
- Awards: Perkin Medal (1962)
- Scientific career
- Fields: Inorganic chemistry

Eugene George Rochow (October 4, 1909 – March 21, 2002) was an American inorganic chemist. Rochow worked on organosilicon chemistry; in the 1940s, he described the direct process, also known as the Rochow process or Müller-Rochow process.

Born in Newark, New Jersey, Rochow grew up in Maplewood, New Jersey and attended Columbia High School, where teachers fostered his interest in math and chemistry. He obtained both B.S. and Ph.D. degrees from Cornell University in 1931 and 1935 respectively. Upon completion of his Ph.D., he began working for a General Electric subsidiary. In 1948, Rochow resigned from GE due to his Quaker beliefs. He joined the faculty at Harvard University where he remained until his retirement in 1970. He was elected a Fellow of the American Academy of Arts and Sciences in 1949. He is known for developing, with A. Louis Allred, the Allred-Rochow electronegativity scale. In 1962, he was awarded the Perkin Medal. Rochow died in Fort Myers, Florida aged 92.
