= Albert L. Allred =

American chemist (born 1931)

Albert Louis Allred
- Born: September 19, 1931 (age 95); Mount Airy, North Carolina, U.S.
- Education: University of North Carolina (B.A.); Harvard University (M.A., Ph.D.)
- Scientific career
- Fields: Inorganic chemistry; Electronegativity

Albert Louis Allred (born September 19, 1931) is an American chemist accomplished in the fields of inorganic chemistry and electronegativity. He was born in Mount Airy, North Carolina, United States.

== Education and career ==
Allred studied chemistry at the University of North Carolina and earned a bachelor's degree in 1953. He studied at Harvard University and earned a master's degree in 1955, followed by a doctorate in 1957. In 1956 he was an instructor, 1958 assistant professor, and 1969 professor at the College of Arts and Sciences of Northwestern University. From 1980 to 1986, he was chairman of the chemistry department. In 1992, he became acting vice president for research as well as dean of the graduate school.

In 1987, he was a visiting scholar at Cambridge University, in 1965 Honorary Research Associate at University College London and in 1967 at the University of Rome. From 1963 to 1965, he was a Sloan Research Fellow. He has been a Fellow of the American Association for the Advancement of Science since 1981.

Allred introduced the Allred-Rochow scale of electronegativity with Eugene G. Rochow in 1958. They predicted that electronegativity, should be related to the charge experienced by an electron on the "surface" of an atom. They calculated this formula for the electronegativity, χ, where "$Z_{\rm eff}$" is equal to the effective nuclear charge and "$r_{\rm cov}$" is the covalent radius. When the covalent radius is expressed in picometers:

$$\chi = 3590{{Z_{\rm eff}}\over{r^2_{\rm cov}}} + 0.744$$.

When expressed in Angstroms however, the value 3590, becomes .359.

$$\chi = .359{{Z_{\rm eff}}\over{r^2_{\rm cov}}} + 0.744$$

Allred has also since dealt with synthetic inorganic, organometallic chemistry, and electrochemistry.
