= Period 3 element =

Third row of the periodic table

A period 3 element is one of the chemical elements in the third row (or period) of the periodic table of the chemical elements. The periodic table is laid out in rows to illustrate recurring (periodic) trends in the chemical behavior of the elements as their atomic number increases: a new row is begun when chemical behavior begins to repeat, meaning that elements with similar behavior fall into the same vertical columns. The third period contains eight elements: sodium, magnesium, aluminium, silicon, phosphorus, sulfur, chlorine and argon. The first two, sodium and magnesium, are members of the s-block of the periodic table, while the others are members of the p-block. All of the period 3 elements occur in nature and have at least one stable isotope.

== Atomic structure ==
In a quantum mechanical description of atomic structure, this period corresponds to the buildup of electrons in the third (n = 3) shell, more specifically filling its 3s and 3p subshells. There is a 3d subshell, but—in compliance with the Aufbau principle—it is not filled until period 4. This makes all eight elements analogs of the period 2 elements in the same exact sequence. The octet rule generally applies to period 3 in the same way as to period 2 elements, because the 3d subshell is normally non-acting.

== Elements ==
Elements by number
Element	#	Symbol	Block	Electron configuration
Sodium	11	Na	s-block	[Ne] 3s^{1}
Magnesium	12	Mg	s-block	[Ne] 3s^{2}
Aluminium	13	Al	p-block	[Ne] 3s^{2} 3p^{1}
Silicon	14	Si	p-block	[Ne] 3s^{2} 3p^{2}
Phosphorus	15	P	p-block	[Ne] 3s^{2} 3p^{3}
Sulfur	16	S	p-block	[Ne] 3s^{2} 3p^{4}
Chlorine	17	Cl	p-block	[Ne] 3s^{2} 3p^{5}
Argon	18	Ar	p-block	[Ne] 3s^{2} 3p^{6}

=== Sodium ===
Sodium (symbol Na) is a soft, silvery-white, highly reactive metal and is a member of the alkali metals; its only stable isotope is ^{23}Na. It is an abundant element that exists in numerous minerals such as feldspars, sodalite and rock salt. Many salts of sodium are highly soluble in water and are thus present in significant quantities in the Earth's bodies of water, most abundantly in the oceans as sodium chloride.

Many sodium compounds are useful, such as sodium hydroxide (lye) for soapmaking, and sodium chloride for use as a deicing agent and a nutrient. The same ion is also a component of many minerals, such as sodium nitrate.

The free metal, elemental sodium, does not occur in nature but must be prepared from sodium compounds. Elemental sodium was first isolated by Humphry Davy in 1807 by the electrolysis of sodium hydroxide.

=== Magnesium ===
Magnesium (symbol Mg) is an alkaline earth metal and has common oxidation number +2. It is the eighth most abundant element in the Earth's crust and the ninth in the known universe as a whole. Magnesium is the fourth most common element in the Earth as a whole (behind iron, oxygen and silicon), making up 13% of the planet's mass and a large fraction of the planet's mantle. It is relatively abundant because it is easily built up in supernova stars by sequential additions of three helium nuclei to carbon (which in turn is made from three helium nuclei). Due to the magnesium ion's high solubility in water, it is the third most abundant element dissolved in seawater.

The free element (metal) is not found naturally on Earth, as it is highly reactive (though once produced, it is coated in a thin layer of oxide [see passivation], which partly masks this reactivity). The free metal burns with a characteristic brilliant white light, making it a useful ingredient in flares. The metal is now mainly obtained by electrolysis of magnesium salts obtained from brine. Commercially, the chief use for the metal is as an alloying agent to make aluminium-magnesium alloys, sometimes called "magnalium" or "magnelium". Since magnesium is less dense than aluminium, these alloys are prized for their relative lightness and strength.

Magnesium ions are sour to the taste, and in low concentrations help to impart a natural tartness to fresh mineral waters.

=== Aluminium ===
Aluminium (symbol Al) or aluminum (American English) is a silvery white member of the boron group of chemical elements and a p-block metal classified by some chemists as a post-transition metal. It is not soluble in water under normal circumstances. Aluminium is the third most abundant element (after oxygen and silicon), and the most abundant metal, in the Earth's crust. It makes up about 8% by weight of the Earth's solid surface. Aluminium metal is too reactive chemically to occur natively. Instead, it is found combined in over 270 different minerals. The chief ore of aluminium is bauxite.

Aluminium is remarkable for the metal's low density and for its ability to resist corrosion due to the phenomenon of passivation. Structural components made from aluminium and its alloys are vital to the aerospace industry and are important in other areas of transportation and structural materials. The most useful compounds of aluminium, at least on a weight basis, are the oxides and sulfates.

=== Silicon ===
Silicon (symbol Si) is a group 14 metalloid. It is less reactive than its chemical analog carbon, the nonmetal directly above it in the periodic table, but more reactive than germanium, the metalloid directly below it in the table. Controversy about silicon's character dates from its discovery: silicon was first prepared and characterized in pure form in 1824, and given the name silicium (from Latin: silicis, flints), with an -ium word-ending to suggest a metal. However, its final name, suggested in 1831, reflects the more chemically similar elements carbon and boron.

Silicon is the eighth most common element in the universe by mass, but very rarely occurs as the pure free element in nature. It is most widely distributed in dusts, sands, planetoids and planets as various forms of silicon dioxide (silica) or silicates. Over 90% of the Earth's crust is composed of silicate minerals, making silicon the second most abundant element in the Earth's crust (about 28% by mass) after oxygen.

Most silicon is used commercially without being separated, and indeed often with little processing of compounds from nature. These include direct industrial building use of clays, silica sand and stone. Silica is used in ceramic brick. Silicate goes into Portland cement for mortar and stucco, and combined with silica sand and gravel, to make concrete. Silicates are also in whiteware ceramics such as porcelain, and in traditional quartz-based soda–lime glass. More modern silicon compounds such as silicon carbide form abrasives and high-strength ceramics. Silicon is the basis of the ubiquitous synthetic silicon-based polymers called silicones.

Elemental silicon also has a large impact on the modern world economy. Although most free silicon is used in the steel refining, aluminum-casting, and fine chemical industries (often to make fumed silica), the relatively small portion of very highly purified silicon that is used in semiconductor electronics (< 10%) is perhaps even more critical. Because of wide use of silicon in integrated circuits, the basis of most computers, a great deal of modern technology depends on it.

=== Phosphorus ===
Phosphorus (symbol P) is a multivalent nonmetal of the nitrogen group, phosphorus as a mineral is almost always present in its maximally oxidized (pentavalent) state, as inorganic phosphate rocks. Elemental phosphorus exists in two major forms—white phosphorus and red phosphorus—but due to its high reactivity, phosphorus is never found as a free element on Earth.

The first form of elemental phosphorus to be produced (white phosphorus, in 1669) emits a faint glow upon exposure to oxygen – hence its name given from Greek mythology, Φωσφόρος meaning "light-bearer" (Latin: Lucifer), referring to the "Morning Star", the planet Venus. Although the term "phosphorescence", meaning glow after illumination, derives from this property of phosphorus, the glow of phosphorus originates from oxidation of the white (but not red) phosphorus and should be called chemiluminescence. It is also the lightest element to easily produce stable exceptions to the octet rule.

The vast majority of phosphorus compounds are consumed as fertilizers. Other applications include the role of organophosphorus compounds in detergents, pesticides, nerve agents and matches.

=== Sulfur ===
Sulfur (symbol S) is an abundant multivalent nonmetal, one of chalcogens. Under normal conditions, sulfur atoms form cyclic octatomic molecules with chemical formula S_{8}. Elemental sulfur is a bright yellow crystalline solid when at room temperature. Chemically, sulfur can react as either an oxidant or a reducing agent. It oxidizes most metals and several nonmetals, including carbon, which leads to its negative charge in most organosulfur compounds, but it reduces several strong oxidants, such as oxygen and fluorine.

In nature, sulfur can be found as the pure element and as sulfide and sulfate minerals. Elemental sulfur crystals are commonly sought after by mineral collectors for their brightly colored polyhedron shapes. Being abundant in native form, sulfur was known in ancient times, mentioned for its uses in ancient Greece, China and Egypt. Sulfur fumes were used as fumigants, and sulfur-containing medicinal mixtures were used as balms and antiparasitics. Sulfur is referenced in the Bible as brimstone in English, with this name still used in several nonscientific terms. Sulfur was considered important enough to receive its own alchemical symbol. It was needed to make the best quality of black gunpowder, and the bright yellow powder was hypothesized by alchemists to contain some of the properties of gold, which they sought to synthesize from it. In 1777, Antoine Lavoisier helped convince the scientific community that sulfur was a basic element, rather than a compound.

Elemental sulfur was once extracted from salt domes, where it sometimes occurs in nearly pure form, but this method has been obsolete since the late 20th century. Today, almost all elemental sulfur is produced as a byproduct of removing sulfur-containing contaminants from natural gas and petroleum. The element's commercial uses are primarily in fertilizers, because of the relatively high requirement of plants for it, and in the manufacture of sulfuric acid, a primary industrial chemical. Other well-known uses for the element are in matches, insecticides and fungicides. Many sulfur compounds are odiferous, and the smell of odorized natural gas, skunk scent, grapefruit, and garlic is due to sulfur compounds. Hydrogen sulfide produced by living organisms imparts the characteristic odor to rotting eggs and other biological processes.

=== Chlorine ===
Chlorine (symbol Cl) is the second-lightest halogen. The element forms diatomic molecules under standard conditions, called dichlorine. It has the highest electron affinity and the one of highest electronegativity of all the elements; thus chlorine is a strong oxidizing agent.

The most common compound of chlorine, sodium chloride (table salt), has been known since ancient times; however, around 1630, chlorine gas was obtained by the Belgian chemist and physician Jan Baptist van Helmont. The synthesis and characterization of elemental chlorine occurred in 1774 by Swedish chemist Carl Wilhelm Scheele, who called it "dephlogisticated muriatic acid air", as he thought he synthesized the oxide obtained from the hydrochloric acid, because acids were thought at the time to necessarily contain oxygen. A number of chemists, including Claude Berthollet, suggested that Scheele's "dephlogisticated muriatic acid air" must be a combination of oxygen and the yet undiscovered element, and Scheele named the supposed new element within this oxide as muriaticum. The suggestion that this newly discovered gas was a simple element was made in 1809 by Joseph Louis Gay-Lussac and Louis-Jacques. This was confirmed in 1810 by Sir Humphry Davy, who named it chlorine, from the Greek word χλωρός (chlōros), meaning "green-yellow".

Chlorine is a component of many other compounds. It is the second most abundant halogen and 21st most abundant element in Earth's crust. The great oxidizing power of chlorine led it to its bleaching and disinfectant uses, as well as being an essential reagent in the chemical industry. As a common disinfectant, chlorine compounds are used in swimming pools to keep them clean and sanitary. In the upper atmosphere, chlorine-containing molecules such as chlorofluorocarbons have been implicated in ozone depletion.

=== Argon ===
Argon (symbol Ar) is the third element in group 18, the noble gases. Argon is the third most common gas in the Earth's atmosphere, at 0.93%, making it more common than carbon dioxide. Nearly all of this argon is radiogenic argon-40 derived from the decay of potassium-40 in the Earth's crust. In the universe, argon-36 is by far the most common argon isotope, being the preferred argon isotope produced by stellar nucleosynthesis.

The name "argon" is derived from the Greek neuter adjective ἀργόν, meaning "lazy" or "the inactive one", as the element undergoes almost no chemical reactions. The complete octet (eight electrons) in the outer atomic shell makes argon stable and resistant to bonding with other elements. Its triple point temperature of 83.8058 K is a defining fixed point in the International Temperature Scale of 1990.

Argon is produced industrially by the fractional distillation of liquid air. Argon is mostly used as an inert shielding gas in welding and other high-temperature industrial processes where ordinarily non-reactive substances become reactive: for example, an argon atmosphere is used in graphite electric furnaces to prevent the graphite from burning. Argon gas also has uses in incandescent and fluorescent lighting, and other types of gas discharge tubes. Argon makes a distinctive blue–green gas laser.

== Biological roles ==
Sodium is an essential element for all animals and some plants. In animals, sodium ions are used against potassium ions to build up charges on cell membranes, allowing transmission of nerve impulses when the charge is dissipated; it is therefore classified as a dietary inorganic macromineral.

Magnesium is the eleventh most abundant element by mass in the human body; its ions are essential to all living cells, where they play a major role in manipulating important biological polyphosphate compounds like ATP, DNA, and RNA. Hundreds of enzymes thus require magnesium ions to function. Magnesium is also the metallic ion at the center of chlorophyll, and is thus a common additive to fertilizers. Magnesium compounds are used medicinally as common laxatives, antacids (e.g., milk of magnesia), and in a number of situations where stabilization of abnormal nerve excitation and blood vessel spasm is required (e.g., to treat eclampsia).

Despite its prevalence in the environment, aluminium salts are not known to be used by any form of life. In keeping with its pervasiveness, it is well tolerated by plants and animals. Because of their prevalence, potential beneficial (or otherwise) biological roles of aluminium compounds are of continuing interest.

Silicon is an essential element in biology, although only tiny traces of it appear to be required by animals, though various sea sponges need silicon in order to have structure. It is much more important to the metabolism of plants, particularly many grasses, and silicic acid (a type of silica) forms the basis of the striking array of protective shells of the microscopic diatoms.

Phosphorus is essential for life. As phosphate, it is a component of DNA, RNA, ATP, and also the phospholipids that form all cell membranes. Demonstrating the link between phosphorus and life, elemental phosphorus was historically first isolated from human urine, and bone ash was an important early phosphate source. Phosphate minerals are fossils. Low phosphate levels are an important limit to growth in some aquatic systems. Today, the most important commercial use of phosphorus-based chemicals is the production of fertilizers, to replace the phosphorus that plants remove from the soil.

Sulfur is an essential element for all life, and is widely used in biochemical processes. In metabolic reactions, sulfur compounds serve as both fuels and respiratory (oxygen-replacing) materials for simple organisms. Sulfur in organic form is present in the vitamins biotin and thiamine, the latter being named for the Greek word for sulfur. Sulfur is an important part of many enzymes and in antioxidant molecules like glutathione and thioredoxin. Organically bonded sulfur is a component of all proteins, as the amino acids cysteine and methionine. Disulfide bonds are largely responsible for the mechanical strength and insolubility of the protein keratin, found in outer skin, hair, and feathers, and the element contributes to their pungent odor when burned.

Elemental chlorine is extremely dangerous and poisonous for all lifeforms, and is used as a pulmonary agent in chemical warfare; however, chlorine is necessary to most forms of life, including humans, in the form of chloride ions.

Argon has no biological role. Like any gas besides oxygen, argon is an asphyxiant.

== Table of elements ==
Period 3 in the periodic table
	1	2	3	4	5	6	7	8	9	10	11	12	13	14	15	16	17	18
Group →
↓ Period
3	Sodium11Na22.990	Magnesium12Mg24.305											Aluminium13Al26.982	Silicon14Si28.085	Phosphorus15P30.974	Sulfur16S32.06	Chlorine17Cl35.45	Argon18Ar39.95
Primordial From decay Synthetic Border shows natural occurrence of the element: s-block / f-block / d-block / p-block
