= Electron affinity (data page) =

Chemical data page

This page deals with the electron affinity as a property of isolated atoms or molecules (i.e. in the gas phase). Solid state electron affinities are not listed here.

== Elements ==
Electron affinity can be defined in two equivalent ways. First, as the energy that is released by adding an electron to an isolated gaseous atom. The second (reverse) definition is that electron affinity is the energy required to remove an electron from a singly charged gaseous negative ion. The latter can be regarded as the ionization energy of the −1 ion or the zeroth ionization energy. Either convention can be used.

Negative electron affinities can be used in those cases where electron capture requires energy, i.e. when capture can occur only if the impinging electron has a kinetic energy large enough to excite a resonance of the atom-plus-electron system. Conversely electron removal from the anion formed in this way releases energy, which is carried out by the freed electron as kinetic energy. Negative ions formed in these cases are always unstable. They may have lifetimes of the order of microseconds to milliseconds, and invariably autodetach after some time.

† A quantum offset of the velocity imaging-based measurements was revealed in 2025, which could make a revision of all electron affinities marked with a dagger ^{†} necessary. The value of the downward correction to be applied is determined by the intensity of the electric field that was used in the experiment, which was not published with the original measurements, but can be estimated to be of the order of −20 μeV. However, subsequent studies have called both the magnitude and the very existence of such a quantum offset into question. A 2026 evaluation that combined simulations and high-precision experiments found no evidence for a quantum offset as large as 0.2 cm⁻¹ in properly analyzed slow‑electron velocity‑map imaging (SEVI) data. The original claim of a quantum offset in SEVI measurements rests on incorrect assumptions made in the LPM method. Moreover, the electron affinity of selenium determined by the LPM method deviates by approximately 0.5 cm⁻¹ from the values obtained with SEVI and with earlier laser photodetachment threshold (LPT) measurements. This discrepancy suggests that the LPM method alone may not provide a sufficiently reliable benchmark for validating other experimental techniques.

Z	Element	Name	Electron affinity (eV)	Electron affinity (kJ/mol)	References
1	^{1}H	Hydrogen	0.754 195(19)	72.769(2)	
1	^{2}H	Deuterium	0.754 67(4)	72.814(4)	
2	He	Helium	−0.5(2)	−48(20)	est.
3	Li	Lithium	0.618 049(22)	59.632 6(21)	
4	Be	Beryllium	−0.5(2)	−48(20)	est.
5	B	Boron	0.279 723(25)	26.989(3)	
6	^{12}C	Carbon	1.262 122 6(11)	121.776 3(1)	
6	^{13}C	Carbon	1.262 113 6(12)	121.775 5(2)	
7	N	Nitrogen	−0.07	−6.8	
8	^{16}O	Oxygen	1.461 112 97(9)	140.975 970(9)	
8	^{17}O	Oxygen	1.461 108(4)	140.975 5(3)	
8	^{18}O	Oxygen	1.461 105(3)	140.975 2(3)	
9	F	Fluorine	3.401 189 8(24)	328.164 9(3)	
10	Ne	Neon	−1.2(2)	−116(19)	est.
11	Na	Sodium	0.547 926(25)	52.867(3)	
12	Mg	Magnesium	−0.4(2)	−40(19)	est.
13	Al	Aluminium	0.432 83(5)	41.762(5)	
14	Si	Silicon	1.389 521 2(8)	134.068 4(1)	
15	P	Phosphorus	0.746 609(11)	72.037(1)	
16	^{32}S	Sulfur	2.077 104 2(6)	200.410 1(1)	
16	^{34}S	Sulfur	2.077 104 5(12)	200.410 1(2)	
17	Cl	Chlorine	3.612 725(28)	348.575(3)	
18	Ar	Argon	−1.0(2)	−96(20)	est.
19	K	Potassium	0.501 459(13)	48.383(2)	
20	Ca	Calcium	0.024 55(10)	2.37(1)	
21	Sc	Scandium	0.179 380(23)^{†}	17.307 6(22)	
22	Ti	Titanium	0.075 54(5)^{†}	7.289(5)	
23	V	Vanadium	0.527 66(20)^{†}	50.911(20)	
24	Cr	Chromium	0.675 928(27)^{†}	65.217 2(26)	
25	Mn	Manganese	−0.5(2)	−50(19)	est.
26	Fe	Iron	0.153 236(35)^{†}	14.785(4)	
27	Co	Cobalt	0.662 255(47)^{†}	63.897 9(45)	
28	Ni	Nickel	1.157 16(12)	111.65(2)	
29	Cu	Copper	1.235 78(4)	119.235(4)	
30	Zn	Zinc	−0.6(2)	−58(20)	est.
31	Ga	Gallium	0.301 166(15)^{†}	29.058 1(15)	
32	Ge	Germanium	1.232 676 4(13)	118.935 2(2)	
33	^{75}As	Arsenic	0.804 486(3)	77.621 1(3)	
34	Se	Selenium	2.020 667(5)	194.964 8(5)	
35	Br	Bromine	3.363 588(3)	324.536 9(3)	
36	Kr	Krypton	−1.0(2)	−96(20)	est.
37	Rb	Rubidium	0.485 916(21)	46.884(3)	
38	Sr	Strontium	0.052 06(6)	5.023(6)	
39	Y	Yttrium	0.311 29(22)^{†}	30.035(21)	
40	Zr	Zirconium	0.433 28(9)^{†}	41.806(9)	
41	Nb	Niobium	0.917 40(7)^{†}	88.516(7)	
42	Mo	Molybdenum	0.747 23(8)^{†}	72.097(8)	
43	Tc	Technetium	0.55(20)	53(20)	est.
44	Ru	Ruthenium	1.046 27(2)^{†}	100.950(3)	
45	Rh	Rhodium	1.142 89(20)	110.27(2)	
46	Pd	Palladium	0.562 14(12)	54.24(2)	
47	Ag	Silver	1.304 47(3)	125.862(3)	
48	Cd	Cadmium	−0.7(2)	−68(20)	est.
49	In	Indium	0.38392(6)	37.043(6)	
50	Sn	Tin	1.112 070(2)	107.298 4(3)	
51	Sb	Antimony	1.047 401(19)	101.059(2)	
52	Te	Tellurium	1.970 875(7)	190.161(1)	
53	^{127}I	Iodine	3.059 046 5(37)	295.153 1(4)	
53	^{128}I	Iodine	3.059 052(38)	295.154(4)	
54	Xe	Xenon	−0.8(2)	−77(20)	est.
55	Cs	Caesium	0.4715983(38)	45.5023(4)	
56	Ba	Barium	0.144 62(6)	13.954(6)	
57	La	Lanthanum	0.557 546(20)^{†}	53.795(2)	
58	Ce	Cerium	0.600 160(27)^{†}	57.906 7(26)	
59	Pr	Praseodymium	0.109 23(46)^{†}	10.539(45)	
60	Nd	Neodymium	0.097 49(33)^{†}	9.406(32)	
61	Pm	Promethium	0.129	12.45	
62	Sm	Samarium	0.162	15.63	
63	Eu	Europium	0.116(13)	11.2(13)	
64	Gd	Gadolinium	0.212(30)^{†}	20.5(29)	
65	Tb	Terbium	0.131 31(80)^{†}	12.670(77)	
66	Dy	Dysprosium	0.015(3)	1.45(30)	
67	Ho	Holmium	0.338	32.61	
68	Er	Erbium	0.312	30.10	
69	Tm	Thulium	1.029(22)	99(3)	
70	Yb	Ytterbium	−0.02	−1.93	est.
71	Lu	Lutetium	0.238 8(7)^{†}	23.04(7)	
72	Hf	Hafnium	0.178 0(7)^{†}	17.18(7)	
73	Ta	Tantalum	0.328 859(23)^{†}	31.730 1(22)	
74	W	Tungsten	0.816 500(82)^{†}	78.780 3(80)	
75	Re	Rhenium	0.060 396(64)^{†}	5.827 3(62)	
76	Os	Osmium	1.077 661(24)^{†}	103.978 5(24)	
77	Ir	Iridium	1.564 057(12)^{†}	150.908 6(12)	
78	Pt	Platinum	2.125 10(5)	205.041(5)	
79	Au	Gold	2.308 610(25)	222.747(3)	
80	Hg	Mercury	−0.5(2)	−48(20)	est.
81	Tl	Thallium	0.320 053(19)	30.880 4(19)	
82	Pb	Lead	0.356 721(2)	34.418 3(3)	
83	Bi	Bismuth	0.942 362(13)	90.924(2)	
84	Po	Polonium	1.40(7)	136(7)	calc.
85	At	Astatine	2.415 78(7)	233.087(8)	
86	Rn	Radon	−0.7(2)	−68(20)	est.
87	Fr	Francium	0.486	46.89	est.
88	Ra	Radium	0.10	9.648 5	est.
89	Ac	Actinium	0.35	33.77	est.
90	Th	Thorium	0.607 69(6)^{†}	58.633(6)	
91	Pa	Protactinium	0.55	53.03	est.
92	U	Uranium	0.314 97(9)^{†}	30.390(9)	
93	Np	Neptunium	0.48	45.85	est.
94	Pu	Plutonium	−0.50	−48.33	est.
95	Am	Americium	0.10	9.93	est.
96	Cm	Curium	0.28	27.17	est.
97	Bk	Berkelium	−1.72	−165.24	est.
98	Cf	Californium	−1.01	−97.31	est.
99	Es	Einsteinium	−0.30	−28.60	est.
100	Fm	Fermium	0.35	33.96	est.
101	Md	Mendelevium	0.98	93.91	est.
102	No	Nobelium	−2.33	−223.22	est.
103	Lr	Lawrencium	−0.31	−30.04	est.
111	Rg	Roentgenium	1.565	151.0	calc.
113	Nh	Nihonium	0.69	66.6	calc.
115	Mc	Moscovium	0.366	35.3	calc.
116	Lv	Livermorium	0.776	74.9	calc.
117	Ts	Tennessine	1.719	165.9	calc.
118	Og	Oganesson	0.080(6)	7.72(58)	calc.
119	Uue	Ununennium	0.662	63.87	calc.
120	Ubn	Unbinilium	0.021	2.03	calc.
121	Ubu	Unbiunium	0.57	55	calc.

== Molecules ==
The electron affinities E_{ea} of some molecules are given in the table below, from the lightest to the heaviest. Many more have been listed by Rienstra-Kiracofe et al. (2002). The electron affinities of the radicals OH and SH are the most precisely known of all molecular electron affinities.

Molecule	Name	E_{ea} (eV)	E_{ea} (kJ/mol)	References
Diatomics
^{16}OH	Hydroxyl	1.827 6488(11)	176.3413(2)	Goldfarb et al. (2005)
^{16}OD		1.825 53(4)	176.137(5)	Schulz et al. (1982)
C_{2}	Dicarbon	3.269(6)	315.4(6)	Ervin & Lineberger (1991)
BO	Boron oxide	2.508(8)	242.0(8)	Wenthold et al. (1997)
NO	Nitric oxide	0.026(5)	2.5(5)	Travers, Cowles & Ellison (1989)
O_{2}	Dioxygen	0.450(2)	43.42(20)	Schiedt & Weinkauf (1995)
^{32}SH	Sulfhydryl	2.314 7283(17)	223.3373(2)	Chaibi et al. (2006)
F_{2}	Difluorine	3.08(10)	297(10)	Janousek & Brauman (1979)
Cl_{2}	Dichlorine	2.35(8)	227(8)	Janousek & Brauman (1979)
Br_{2}	Dibromine	2.53(8)	244(8)	Janousek & Brauman (1979)
I_{2}	Diiodine	2.524(5)	243.5(5)	Zanni et al. (1997)
IBr	Iodine monobromide	2.512(3)	242.4(4)	Sheps, Miller & Lineberger (2009)
LiCl	Lithium chloride	0.593(10)	57.2(10)	Miller et al. (1986)
FeO	Iron(II) oxide	1.4950(5)	144.25(6)	Kim, Weichman & Neumark (2015)
CN	Cyano radical	3.862(4)	372.6263	
Triatomics
NO_{2}	Nitrogen dioxide	2.273(5)	219.3(5)	Ervin, Ho & Lineberger (1988)
O_{3}	Ozone	2.1028(25)	202.89(25)	Novick et al. (1979)
SO_{2}	Sulfur dioxide	1.107(8)	106.8(8)	Nimlos & Ellison (1986)
Larger polyatomics
CH_{2}CHO	Vinyloxy	1.8248(+2-6)	176.07(+3-7)	Rienstra-Kiracofe et al. (2002) after Mead et al. (1984)
C_{6}H_{6}	Benzene	−0.70(14)	−68(14)	Ruoff et al. (1995)
C_{6}H_{4}O_{2}	p-Benzoquinone	1.860(5)	179.5(6)	Schiedt & Weinkauf (1999)
BF_{3}	Boron trifluoride	2.65(10)	256(10)	Page & Goode (1969)
HNO_{3}	Nitric acid	0.57(15)	55(14)	Janousek & Brauman (1979)
CH_{3}NO_{2}	Nitromethane	0.172(6)	16.6(6)	Adams et al. (2009)
POCl_{3}	Phosphoryl chloride	1.41(20)	136(20)	Mathur et al. (1976)
SF_{6}	Sulfur hexafluoride	1.03(5)	99.4(49)	Troe, Miller & Viggiano (2012)
C_{2}(CN)_{4}	Tetracyanoethylene	3.17(20)	306(20)	Chowdhury & Kebarle (1986)
WF_{6}	Tungsten hexafluoride	3.5(1)	338(10)	George & Beauchamp (1979)
UF_{6}	Uranium hexafluoride	5.06(20)	488(20)	NIST chemistry webbook after Borshchevskii et al. (1988)
C_{60}	Buckminsterfullerene	2.6835(6)	258.92(6)	Huang et al. (2014)

== Second and third electron affinity ==
Z	Element	Name	Electron affinity (eV)	Electron affinity (kJ/mol)	References
7	N^{−}	Nitrogen	−6.98	−673	
7	N^{2−}	Nitrogen	−11.09	−1070	
8	O^{−}	Oxygen	−7.71	−744	
15	P^{−}	Phosphorus	−4.85	−468	
15	P^{2−}	Phosphorus	−9.18	−886	
16	S^{−}	Sulfur	−4.73	−456	
33	As^{−}	Arsenic	−4.51	−435	
33	As^{2−}	Arsenic	−8.31	−802	
34	Se^{−}	Selenium	−4.25	−410	

== Bibliography ==
- Janousek, Bruce K.; Brauman, John I. (1979), "Electron affinities", in Bowers, M. T. (ed.), Gas Phase Ion Chemistry, vol. 2, New York: Academic Press, p. 53.
- Rienstra-Kiracofe, J.C.; Tschumper, G.S.; Schaefer, H.F.; Nandi, S.; Ellison, G.B. (2002), "Atomic and molecular electron affinities: Photoelectron experiments and theoretical computations", Chem. Rev., vol. 102, no. 1, pp. 231–282, doi:10.1021/cr990044u, PMID 11782134.
- Updated values can be found in the NIST chemistry webbook for around three dozen elements and close to 400 compounds.

=== Specific molecules ===
- Adams, C.L.; Schneider, H.; Ervin, K.M.; Weber, J.M. (2009), "Low-energy photoelectron imaging spectroscopy of nitromethane anions: Electron affinity, vibrational features, anisotropies, and the dipole-bound state", J. Chem. Phys., 130 (7): 074307, Bibcode:2009JChPh.130g4307A, doi:10.1063/1.3076892, PMID 19239294
- Borshchevskii, A.Ya.; Boltalina, O.V.; Sorokin, I.D.; Sidorov, L.N. (1988), "Thermochemical quantities for gas-phase iron, uranium, and molybdenum fluorides, and their negative ions", J. Chem. Thermodyn., 20 (5): 523, Bibcode:1988JChTh..20..523B, doi:10.1016/0021-9614(88)90080-8
- Chaibi, W.; Delsart, C.; Drag, C.; Blondel, C. (2006), "High precision measurement of the ^{32}SH electron affinity by laser detachment microscopy", J. Mol. Spectrosc., 239 (1): 11, Bibcode:2006JMoSp.239...11C, doi:10.1016/j.jms.2006.05.012
- Chowdhury, S.; Kebarle, P. (1986), "Electron affinities of di- and tetracyanoethylene and cyanobenzenes based on measurements of gas-phase electron-transfer equilibria", J. Am. Chem. Soc., 108 (18): 5453, Bibcode:1986JAChS.108.5453C, doi:10.1021/ja00278a014
- Ervin, K.M.; Ho, J.; Lineberger, W.C. (1988), "Ultraviolet photoelectron spectrum of nitrite anion", J. Phys. Chem., 92 (19): 5405, doi:10.1021/j100330a017
- Ervin, K.M.; Lineberger, W.C. (1991), "Photoelectron spectra of C^{−}_{2} and C_{2}H^{−}", J. Phys. Chem., 95 (3): 1167, doi:10.1021/j100156a026
- George, P.M.; Beauchamp, J.L. (1979), "The electron and fluoride affinities of tungsten hexafluoride by ion cyclotron resonance spectroscopy", Chem. Phys., 36 (3): 345, Bibcode:1979CP.....36..345G, doi:10.1016/0301-0104(79)85018-1
- Goldfarb, F.; Drag, C.; Chaibi, W.; Kröger, S.; Blondel, C.; Delsart, C. (2005), "Photodetachment microscopy of the P, Q, and R branches of the OH^{−}(v=0) to OH(v=0) detachment threshold", J. Chem. Phys., 122 (1): 014308, Bibcode:2005JChPh.122a4308G, doi:10.1063/1.1824904, PMID 15638660
- Huang, Dao-Ling; Dau, Phuong Diem; Liu, Hong-Tao; Wang, Lai-Sheng (2014), "High-resolution photoelectron imaging of cold C^{−}_{60} anions and accurate determination of the electron affinity of C_{60}", J. Chem. Phys., 140 (22): 224315, Bibcode:2014JChPh.140v4315H, doi:10.1063/1.4881421, PMID 24929396, S2CID 1061364
- Kim, J.B.; Weichman, M.L.; Neumark, D.M. (2015), "Low-lying states of FeO and FeO^{−} by slow photoelectron spectroscopy", Mol. Phys., 113 (15–16): 2105, Bibcode:2015MolPh.113.2105K, doi:10.1080/00268976.2015.1005706, S2CID 13868986
- Mathur, B.P.; Rothe, E.W.; Tang, S.Y.; Reck, G.P. (1976), "Negative ions from phosphorus halides due to cesium charge exchange", J. Chem. Phys., 65 (2): 565, Bibcode:1976JChPh..65..565M, doi:10.1063/1.433109
- Mead, R.D.; Lykke, K.R.; Lineberger, W.C.; Marks, J.; Brauman, J.I. (1984), "Spectroscopy and dynamics of the dipole-bound state of acetaldehyde enolate", J. Chem. Phys., 81 (11): 4883, Bibcode:1984JChPh..81.4883M, doi:10.1063/1.447515
- Miller, T.M.; Leopold, D.G.; Murray, K.K.; Lineberger, W.C. (1986), "Electron affinities of the alkali halides and the structure of their negative ions", J. Chem. Phys., 85 (5): 2368, Bibcode:1986JChPh..85.2368M, doi:10.1063/1.451091
- Nimlos, Mark R.; Ellison, G. Barney (1986), "Photoelectron spectroscopy of sulfur-containing anions (SO^{−}_{2}, S^{−}_{3}, and S_{2}O^{−})", J. Phys. Chem., 90 (12): 2574, doi:10.1021/j100403a007
- Novick, S.E.; Engelking, P.C.; Jones, P.L.; Futrell, J.H.; Lineberger, W.C. (1979), "Laser photoelectron, photodetachment, and photodestruction spectra of O^{−}_{3}", J. Chem. Phys., 70 (6): 2652, Bibcode:1979JChPh..70.2652N, doi:10.1063/1.437842
- Page, F. M.; Goode, G. C. (1969), Negative ions and the magnetron, John Wiley & Sons
- Ruoff, R.S.; Kadish, K.M.; Boulas, P.; Chen, E.C.M. (1995), "Relationship between the Electron Affinities and Half-Wave Reduction Potentials of Fullerenes, Aromatic Hydrocarbons, and Metal Complexes", J. Phys. Chem., 99 (21): 8843, doi:10.1021/j100021a060
- Schiedt, J.; Weinkauf, R. (1995), "Spin-orbit coupling in the O^{−}_{2} anion", Z. Naturforsch. A, 50 (11): 1041, Bibcode:1995ZNatA..50.1041S, doi:10.1515/zna-1995-1110, S2CID 197275321
- Schiedt, J.; Weinkauf, R. (1999), "Resonant photodetachment via shape and Feshbach resonances: p-benzoquinone anions as a model system", J. Chem. Phys., 110 (1): 304, Bibcode:1999JChPh.110..304S, doi:10.1063/1.478066
- Schulz, P.A.; Mead, R.D.; Jones, P.L.; Lineberger, W.C. (1982), "OH^{−} and OD^{−} threshold photodetachment", J. Chem. Phys., 77 (3): 1153, Bibcode:1982JChPh..77.1153S, doi:10.1063/1.443980
- Sheps, L.; Miller, E.M.; Lineberger, W.C. (2009), "Photoelectron spectroscopy of small IBr^{−}(CO_{2})_{n}(n=0–3) cluster anions", J. Chem. Phys., 131 (6): 064304, Bibcode:2009JChPh.131f4304S, doi:10.1063/1.3200941, PMID 19691385
- Travers, M.J.; Cowles, D.C.; Ellison, G.B. (1989), "Reinvestigation of the electron affinities of O_{2} and NO", Chem. Phys. Lett., 164 (5): 449, Bibcode:1989CPL...164..449T, doi:10.1016/0009-2614(89)85237-6
- Troe, J.; Miller, T.M.; Viggiano, A.A. (2012), "Communication:Revised electron affinity of SF_{6} from kinetic data", J. Chem. Phys., 136 (2): 121102, Bibcode:2012JChPh.136l1102T, doi:10.1063/1.3698170, hdl:11858/00-001M-0000-000F-A0CD-D, PMID 22462826
- Wenthold, P.G.; Kim, J.B.; Jonas, K.-L.; Lineberger, W.C. (1997), "An Experimental and Computational Study of the Electron Affinity of Boron Oxide", J. Phys. Chem. A, 101 (24): 4472, Bibcode:1997JPCA..101.4472W, doi:10.1021/jp970645u
- Zanni, M.T.; Taylor, T.R.; Greenblatt, B.J.; Soep, B.; Neumark, D.M. (1997), "Characterization of the I^{−}_{2} anion ground state using conventional and femtosecond photoelectron spectroscopy", J. Chem. Phys., 107 (19): 7613, Bibcode:1997JChPh.107.7613Z, doi:10.1063/1.475110
