= Group 9 element =

Group of chemical elements

Group 9 in the periodic table
Hydrogen																															Helium
Lithium	Beryllium																									Boron	Carbon	Nitrogen	Oxygen	Fluorine	Neon
Sodium	Magnesium																									Aluminium	Silicon	Phosphorus	Sulfur	Chlorine	Argon
Potassium	Calcium															Scandium	Titanium	Vanadium	Chromium	Manganese	Iron	Cobalt	Nickel	Copper	Zinc	Gallium	Germanium	Arsenic	Selenium	Bromine	Krypton
Rubidium	Strontium															Yttrium	Zirconium	Niobium	Molybdenum	Technetium	Ruthenium	Rhodium	Palladium	Silver	Cadmium	Indium	Tin	Antimony	Tellurium	Iodine	Xenon
Caesium	Barium	Lanthanum	Cerium	Praseodymium	Neodymium	Promethium	Samarium	Europium	Gadolinium	Terbium	Dysprosium	Holmium	Erbium	Thulium	Ytterbium	Lutetium	Hafnium	Tantalum	Tungsten	Rhenium	Osmium	Iridium	Platinum	Gold	Mercury (element)	Thallium	Lead	Bismuth	Polonium	Astatine	Radon
Francium	Radium	Actinium	Thorium	Protactinium	Uranium	Neptunium	Plutonium	Americium	Curium	Berkelium	Californium	Einsteinium	Fermium	Mendelevium	Nobelium	Lawrencium	Rutherfordium	Dubnium	Seaborgium	Bohrium	Hassium	Meitnerium	Darmstadtium	Roentgenium	Copernicium	Nihonium	Flerovium	Moscovium	Livermorium	Tennessine	Oganesson
group 8 ← → group 10
IUPAC group number	9
Name by element	cobalt group
CAS group number (US, pattern A-B-A)	part of VIIIB
old IUPAC number (Europe, pattern A-B)	part of VIII

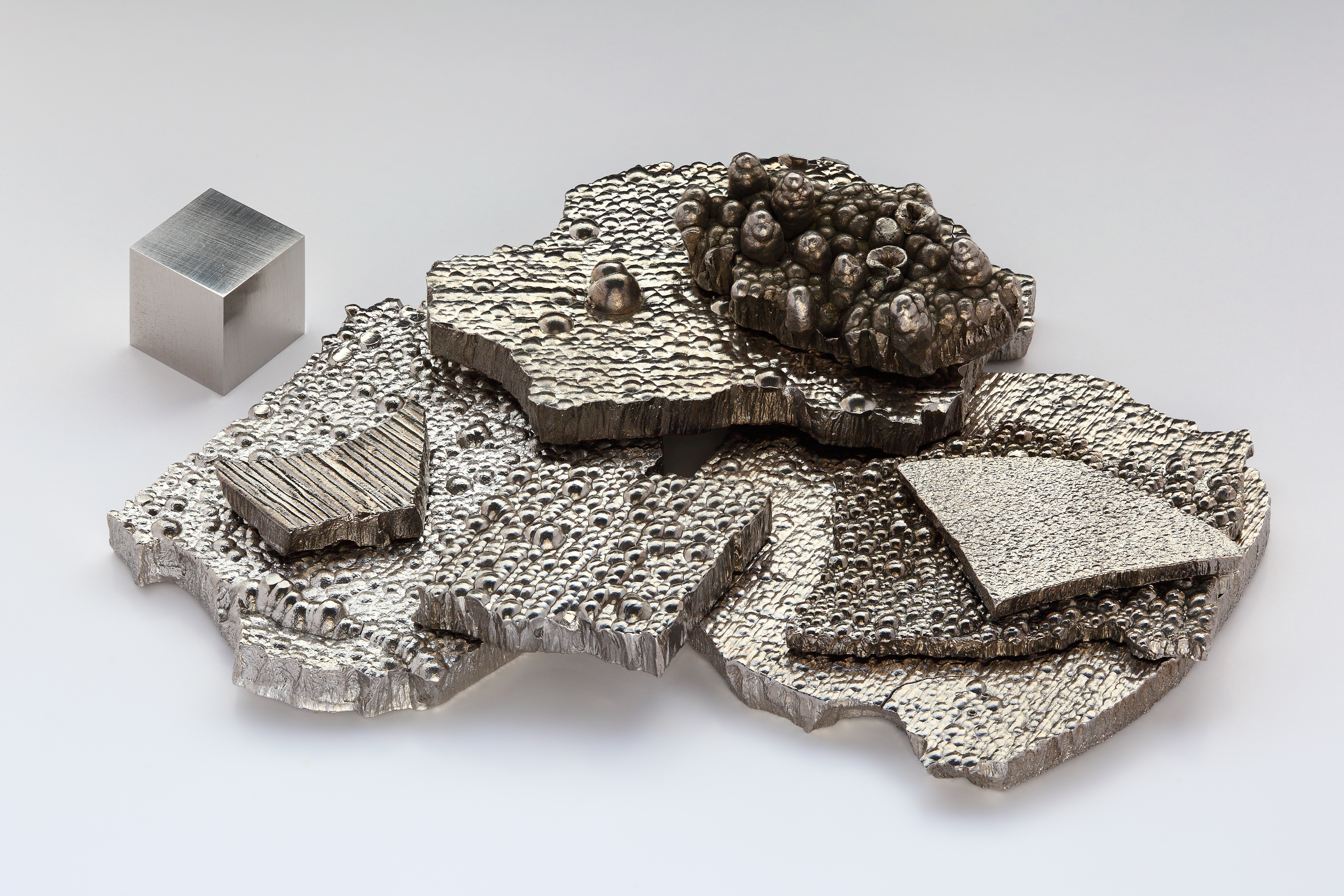
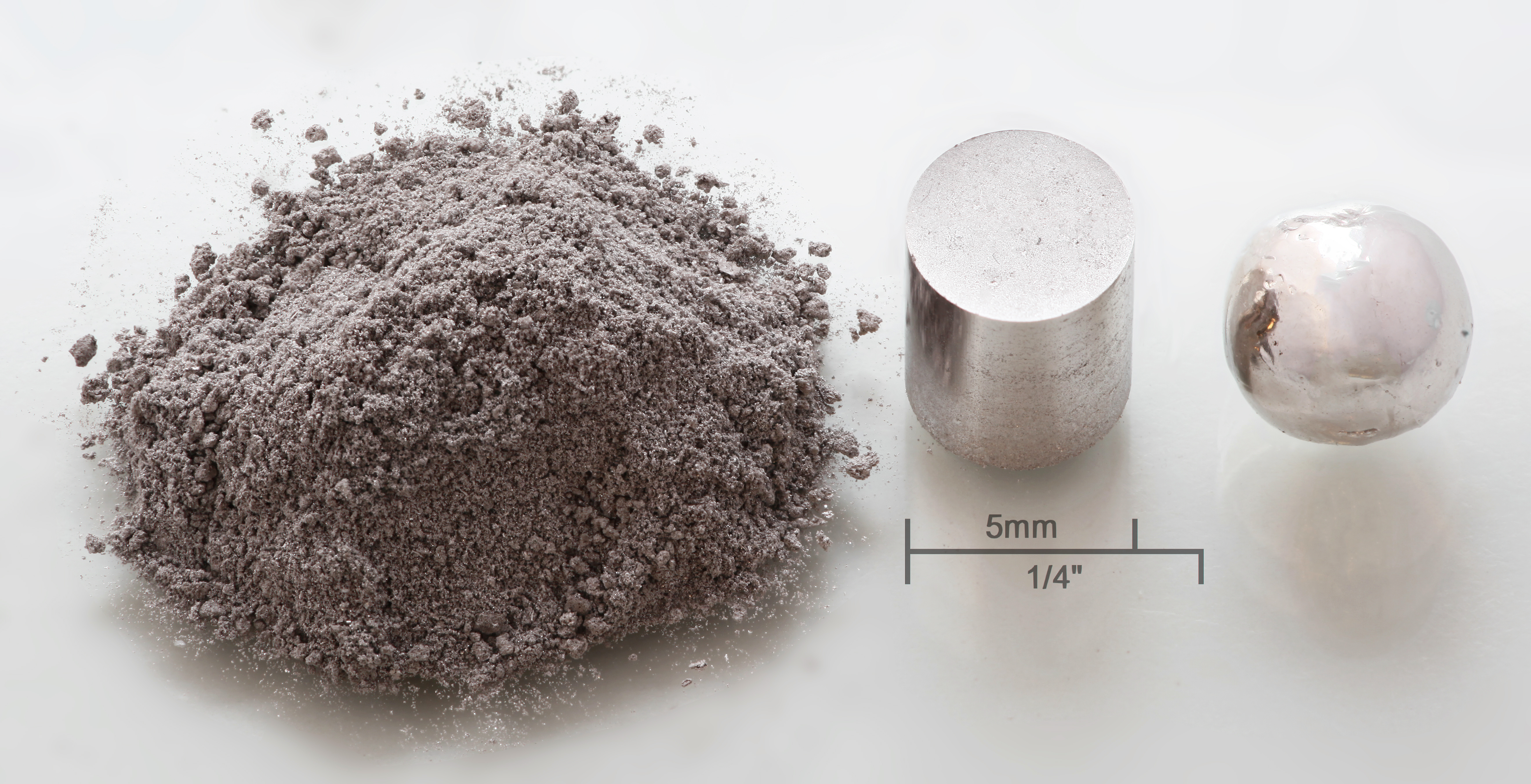
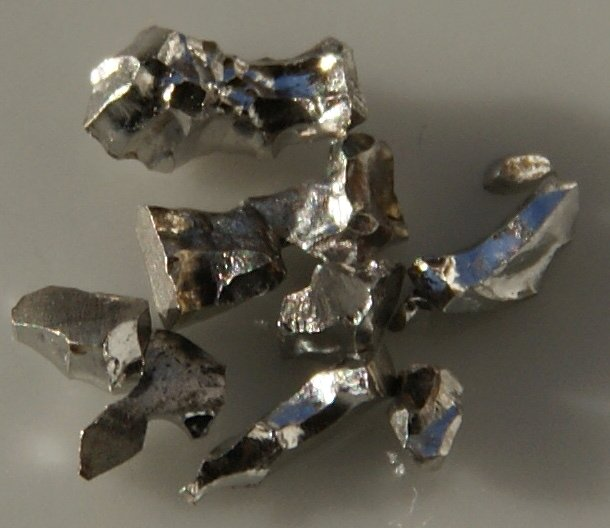
↓ Period
4	Cobalt (Co); 27 Transition metal
5	Rhodium (Rh); 45 Transition metal
6	Iridium (Ir); 77 Transition metal
7	Meitnerium (Mt); 109 unknown chemical properties
Legend primordial element synthetic element

Group 9, by modern IUPAC numbering, is a group (column) of chemical elements in the d-block of the periodic table. Members of Group 9 include cobalt (Co), rhodium (Rh), iridium (Ir) and meitnerium (Mt). These elements are among the rarest of the transition metals, and as of 2025 rhodium and iridium are the only non-radioactive metals with higher prices per weight than gold.

Like other groups, the members of this family show patterns in electron configuration, especially in the outermost shells, resulting in trends in chemical behavior; however, rhodium deviates from the pattern.

== History ==
"Group 9" is the modern standard designation for this group, adopted by the IUPAC in 1990. In the older group naming systems, this group was combined with group 8 (iron, ruthenium, osmium, and hassium) and group 10 (nickel, palladium, platinum, and darmstadtium) and called group "VIIIB" in the Chemical Abstracts Service (CAS) "U.S. system", or "VIII" in the old IUPAC (pre-1990) "European system" (and in Mendeleev's original table).

=== Cobalt ===
Cobalt compounds have been used for centuries to impart a rich blue color to glass, glazes, and ceramics. Cobalt has been detected in Egyptian sculpture, Persian jewelry from the third millennium BC, in the ruins of Pompeii, destroyed in 79 AD, and in China, dating from the Tang dynasty (618–907 AD) and the Ming dynasty (1368–1644 AD).

Swedish chemist Georg Brandt (1694–1768) is credited with discovering cobalt c. 1735, showing it to be a previously unknown element, distinct from bismuth and other traditional metals. Brandt called it a new "semi-metal". He showed that compounds of cobalt metal were the source of the blue color in glass, which previously had been attributed to the bismuth found with cobalt. Cobalt became the first metal to be discovered since the pre-historical period. All other known metals (iron, copper, silver, gold, zinc, mercury, tin, lead and bismuth) had no recorded discoverers.

=== Rhodium ===
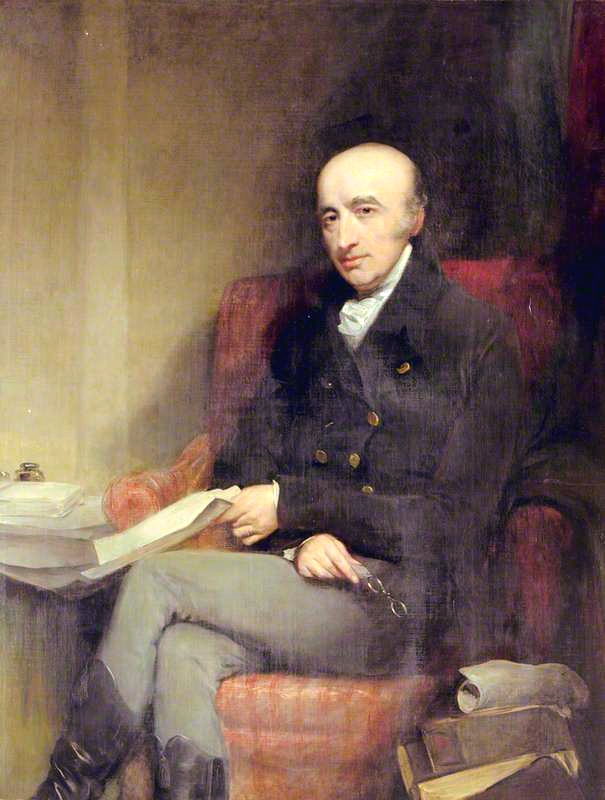
William Hyde Wollaston

Rhodium was discovered in 1803 by William Hyde Wollaston, soon after he discovered palladium. He used crude platinum ore presumably obtained from South America. His procedure dissolved the ore in aqua regia and neutralized the acid with sodium hydroxide (NaOH). He then precipitated the platinum as ammonium chloroplatinate by adding ammonium chloride (NH_{4}Cl). Most other metals like copper, lead, palladium, and rhodium were precipitated with zinc. Diluted nitric acid dissolved all but palladium and rhodium. Of these, palladium dissolved in aqua regia but rhodium did not, and the rhodium was precipitated by the addition of sodium chloride as Na_{3}[RhCl_{6}]·nH_{2}O. After being washed with ethanol, the rose-red precipitate was reacted with zinc, which displaced the rhodium in the ionic compound and thereby released the rhodium as free metal.

=== Iridium ===
Chemists who studied platinum dissolved it in aqua regia (a mixture of hydrochloric and nitric acids) to create soluble salts. They always observed a small amount of a dark, insoluble residue. In 1803, British scientist Smithson Tennant (1761–1815) analyzed the insoluble residue and concluded that it must contain a new metal. Vauquelin treated the powder alternately with alkali and acids and obtained a volatile new oxide, which he believed to be of this new metal—which he named ptene, from the Greek word πτηνός ptēnós, "winged". Tennant, who had the advantage of a much greater amount of residue, continued his research and identified the two previously undiscovered elements in the black residue, iridium and osmium. He obtained dark red crystals (probably of Na_{2}[IrCl_{6}]·nH_{2}O) by a sequence of reactions with sodium hydroxide and hydrochloric acid. He named iridium after Iris (Ἶρις), the Greek winged goddess of the rainbow and the messenger of the Olympian gods, because many of the salts he obtained were strongly colored. (Note: Iridium literally means "of rainbows".) Discovery of the new elements was documented in a letter to the Royal Society on June 21, 1804.

=== Meitnerium ===
Meitnerium was first synthesized on August 29, 1982, by a German research team led by Peter Armbruster and Gottfried Münzenberg at the Institute for Heavy Ion Research (Gesellschaft für Schwerionenforschung) in Darmstadt. The team bombarded a target of bismuth-209 with accelerated nuclei of iron-58 and detected a single atom of the isotope meitnerium-266:

^{209}_{83}Bi + ^{58}_{26}Fe → ^{266}_{109}Mt + n

This work was confirmed three years later at the Joint Institute for Nuclear Research at Dubna (then in the Soviet Union).

== Properties ==
Z	Element	Electrons per shell	M.P.	B.P.	Year of Discovery	Discoverer
27	cobalt	2, 8, 15, 2	1768 K 1495 °C	3200 K 2927 °C	~1735	Georg Brandt
45	rhodium	2, 8, 18, 16, 1	2237 K 1964 °C	3968 K 3695 °C	1803	W. H. Wollaston
77	iridium	2, 8, 18, 32, 15, 2	2719 K 2446 °C	4403 K 4130 °C	1803	S. Tennant
109	meitnerium	2, 8, 18, 32, 32, 15, 2^{[*]}	—	—	1982	P. Armbruster and G. Münzenberg

[*] Predicted.

The first three elements are hard silvery-white metals:

- Cobalt is a metallic element that can be used to turn glass a deep blue color. Cobalt is primarily used in lithium-ion batteries, and in the manufacture of magnetic, wear-resistant and high-strength alloys. The compounds cobalt silicate and cobalt(II) aluminate (CoAl_{2}O_{4}, cobalt blue) give a distinctive deep blue color to glass, ceramics, inks, paints and varnishes. Cobalt occurs naturally as only one stable isotope, cobalt-59. Cobalt-60 is a commercially important radioisotope, used as a radioactive tracer and for the production of high-energy gamma rays. Cobalt is also used in the petroleum industry as a catalyst when refining crude oil. This is to clean it of its sulfur content, which is very polluting when burned and causes acid rain.
- Rhodium can be used in jewelry as a shiny metal. Rhodium is a hard, silvery, durable metal that has a high reflectance. Rhodium metal does not normally form an oxide, even when heated. Oxygen is absorbed from the atmosphere only at the melting point of rhodium but is released on solidification. Rhodium has both a higher melting point and lower density than platinum. It is not attacked by most acids as it is completely insoluble in nitric acid and dissolves slightly in aqua regia.
- Iridium is mainly used as a hardening agent for platinum alloys. Iridium is the most corrosion-resistant metal known as it is not attacked by acids, including aqua regia. In the presence of oxygen, it reacts with cyanide salts. Traditional oxidants also react, including the halogens and oxygen at higher temperatures. Iridium also reacts directly with sulfur at atmospheric pressure to yield iridium disulfide.

All known isotopes of meitnerium are radioactive with short half-lives. Only minute quantities have been synthesized in laboratories. It has not been isolated in pure form, and its physical and chemical properties have not been determined yet. Based on what is known, meitnerium is considered a homologue to iridium.

== Biological role ==
Of the group 9 elements, only cobalt has a biological role. It is a key constituent of cobalamin, also known as vitamin B_{12}, the primary biological reservoir of cobalt as an ultratrace element. Bacteria in the stomachs of ruminant animals convert cobalt salts into vitamin B_{12}, a compound which can only be produced by bacteria or archaea. A minimal presence of cobalt in soils therefore markedly improves the health of grazing animals, and an uptake of 0.20 mg/kg a day is recommended, because they have no other source of vitamin B_{12}.

Proteins based on cobalamin use corrin to hold the cobalt. Coenzyme B_{12} features a reactive C-Co bond that participates in the reactions. In humans, B_{12} has two types of alkyl ligand: methyl and adenosyl. MeB_{12} promotes methyl (−CH_{3}) group transfers. The adenosyl version of B_{12} catalyzes rearrangements in which a hydrogen atom is directly transferred between two adjacent atoms with concomitant exchange of the second substituent, X, which may be a carbon atom with substituents, an oxygen atom of an alcohol, or an amine. Methylmalonyl coenzyme A mutase (MUT) converts MMl-CoA to Su-CoA, an important step in the extraction of energy from proteins and fats.

== See also ==
- Iron group
- Platinum group
