= Group 8 element =

Group of chemical elements in the periodic table

Group 8 in the periodic table
Hydrogen																															Helium
Lithium	Beryllium																									Boron	Carbon	Nitrogen	Oxygen	Fluorine	Neon
Sodium	Magnesium																									Aluminium	Silicon	Phosphorus	Sulfur	Chlorine	Argon
Potassium	Calcium															Scandium	Titanium	Vanadium	Chromium	Manganese	Iron	Cobalt	Nickel	Copper	Zinc	Gallium	Germanium	Arsenic	Selenium	Bromine	Krypton
Rubidium	Strontium															Yttrium	Zirconium	Niobium	Molybdenum	Technetium	Ruthenium	Rhodium	Palladium	Silver	Cadmium	Indium	Tin	Antimony	Tellurium	Iodine	Xenon
Caesium	Barium	Lanthanum	Cerium	Praseodymium	Neodymium	Promethium	Samarium	Europium	Gadolinium	Terbium	Dysprosium	Holmium	Erbium	Thulium	Ytterbium	Lutetium	Hafnium	Tantalum	Tungsten	Rhenium	Osmium	Iridium	Platinum	Gold	Mercury (element)	Thallium	Lead	Bismuth	Polonium	Astatine	Radon
Francium	Radium	Actinium	Thorium	Protactinium	Uranium	Neptunium	Plutonium	Americium	Curium	Berkelium	Californium	Einsteinium	Fermium	Mendelevium	Nobelium	Lawrencium	Rutherfordium	Dubnium	Seaborgium	Bohrium	Hassium	Meitnerium	Darmstadtium	Roentgenium	Copernicium	Nihonium	Flerovium	Moscovium	Livermorium	Tennessine	Oganesson
group 7 ← → group 9
IUPAC group number	8
Name by element	iron group (nonstandard)
CAS group number (US, pattern A-B-A)	part of VIIIB
old IUPAC number (Europe, pattern A-B)	part of VIII

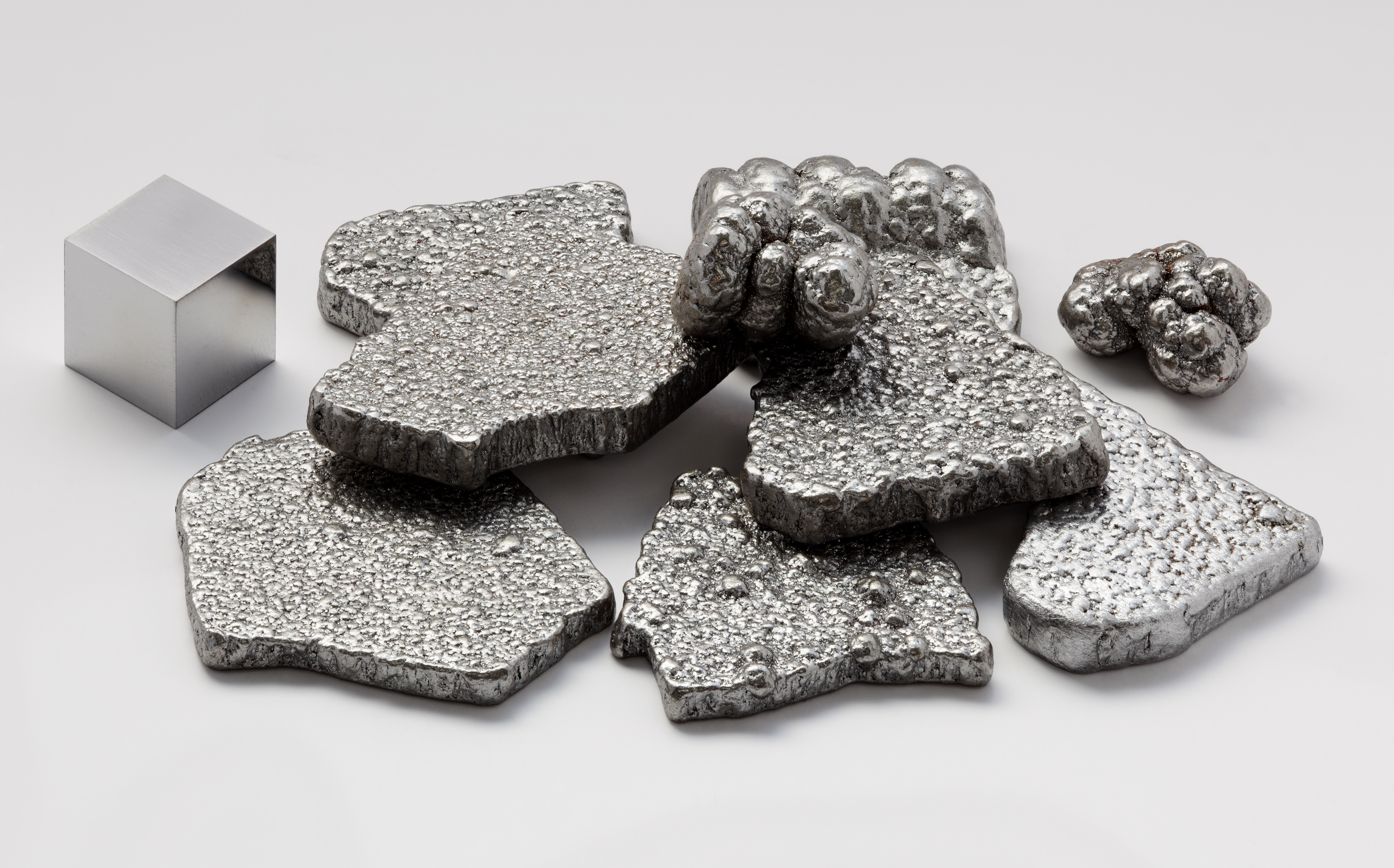
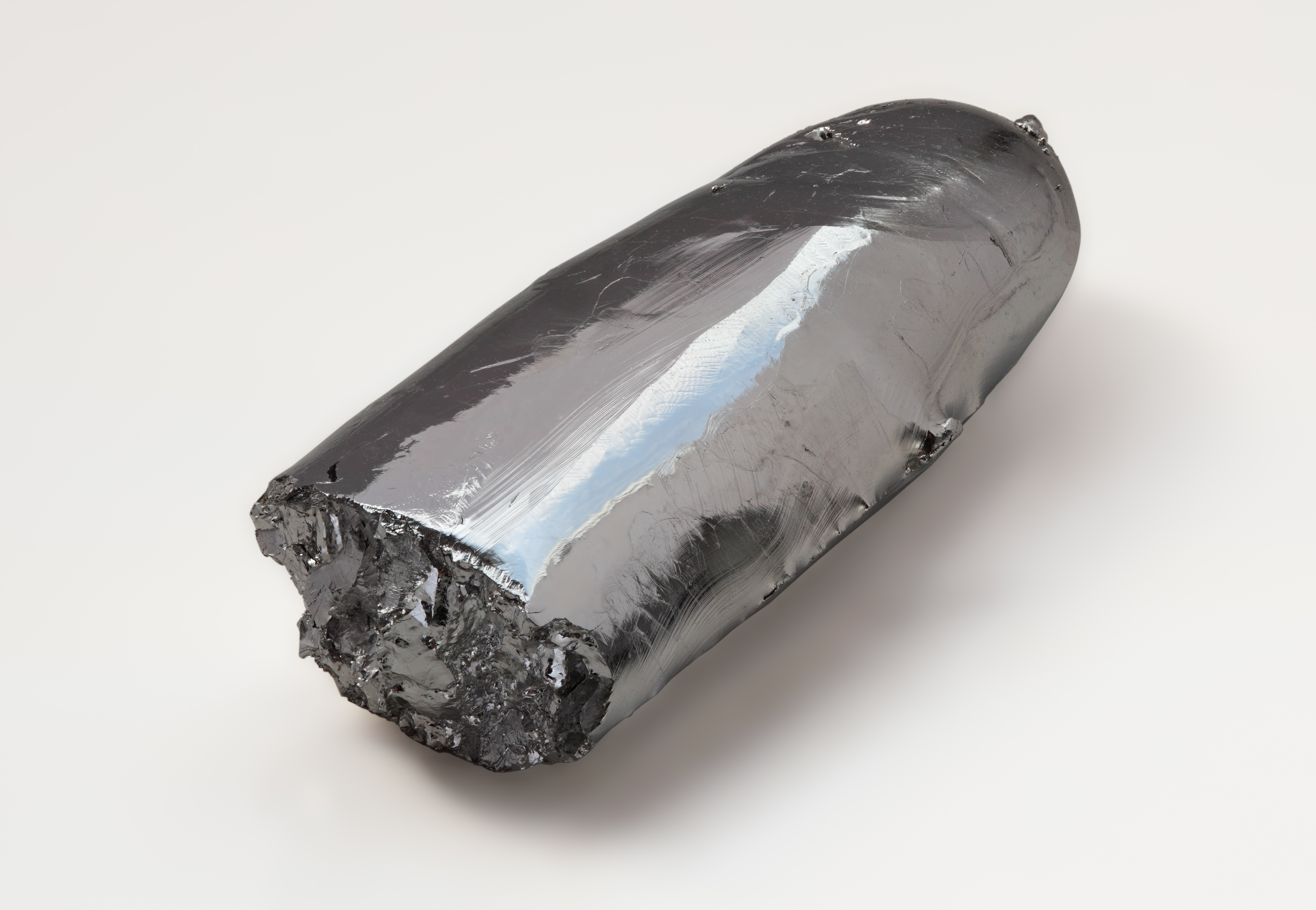
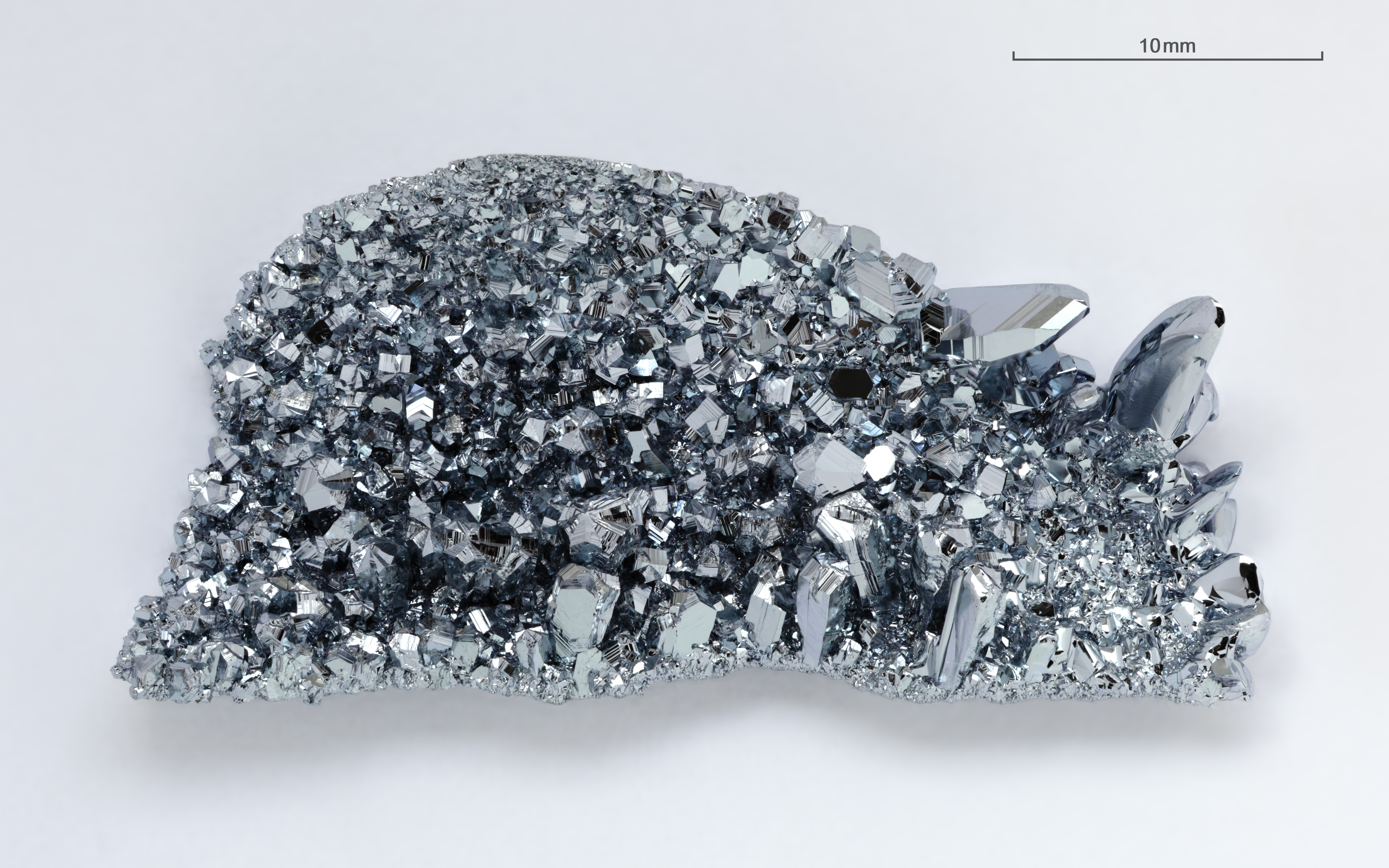
↓ Period
4	Iron (Fe); 26 Transition metal
5	Ruthenium (Ru); 44 Transition metal
6	Osmium (Os); 76 Transition metal
7	Hassium (Hs); 108 Transition metal
Legend primordial element synthetic element

Group 8 is a group (column) of chemical elements in the periodic table. It consists of iron (Fe), ruthenium (Ru), osmium (Os) and hassium (Hs). "Group 8" is the modern standard designation for this group, adopted by the IUPAC in 1990. It should not be confused with "group VIIIA" in the CAS system, which is group 18 (current IUPAC), the noble gases. In the older group naming systems, this group was combined with groups 9 and 10 and called group "VIIIB" in the Chemical Abstracts Service (CAS) "U.S. system", or "VIII" in the old IUPAC (pre-1990) "European system" (and in Mendeleev's original table). The elements in this group are all transition metals that lie in the d-block of the periodic table.

While groups (columns) of the periodic table are usually named after their lightest member (as in "the oxygen group" for group 16), iron group has historically been used differently; most often, it means a set of adjacent elements on period (row) 4 of the table that includes iron, such as chromium, manganese, iron, cobalt, and nickel, or only the last three, or some other set, depending on the context.

Like other groups, the members of this family show patterns in electron configuration, especially in the outermost shells, resulting in trends in chemical behavior.

== Basic properties ==
Z	Element	Electrons per shell	M.P.	B.P.	Year of discovery	Discoverer
26	Iron	2, 8, 14, 2	1811 K 1538 °C	3134 K 2862 °C	<3000 BCE	Unknown
44	Ruthenium	2, 8, 18, 15, 1	2607 K 2334 °C	4423 K 4150 °C	1844	K. E. Claus
76	Osmium	2, 8, 18, 32, 14, 2	3306 K 3033 °C	5285 K 5012 °C	1803	S. Tennant and W. H. Wollaston
108	Hassium	2, 8, 18, 32, 32, 14, 2	—	—	1984	P. Armbruster and G. Münzenberg

^{The following is copied from the pages of Iron, Ruthenium, Osmium, and Hassium respectively.}

Pristine and smooth pure iron surfaces are a mirror-like silvery-gray. Iron reacts readily with oxygen and water to produce brown-to-black hydrated iron oxides, commonly known as rust. Unlike the oxides of some other metals that form passivating layers, rust occupies more volume than the metal and thus flakes off, exposing more fresh surfaces for corrosion. High-purity irons (e.g. electrolytic iron) are more resistant to corrosion.

Because it hardens platinum and palladium alloys, ruthenium is used in electrical contacts, where a thin film is sufficient to achieve the desired durability. With its similar properties to and lower cost than rhodium, electric contacts are a major use of ruthenium. The ruthenium plate is applied to the electrical contact and electrode base metal by electroplating or sputtering.

Osmium is a hard but brittle metal that remains lustrous even at high temperatures. It has a very low compressibility. Correspondingly, its bulk modulus is extremely high, reported between 395 and 462 GPa, which rivals that of diamond (443 GPa). The hardness of osmium is moderately high at 4 GPa. Because of its hardness, brittleness, low vapor pressure (the lowest of the platinum-group metals), and very high melting point (the fourth highest of all elements, after carbon, tungsten, and rhenium), solid osmium is difficult to machine, form, or work.

Very few properties of hassium or its compounds have been measured; this is due to its extremely limited and expensive production and the fact that hassium (and its parents) decays very quickly. A few singular chemistry-related properties have been measured, such as enthalpy of adsorption of hassium tetroxide, but properties of hassium metal remain unknown and only predictions are available. Though despite its radioactivity, chemists have formed hassium tetroxide and sodium hassate(VII) through various means.

== Occurrence and production ==
In terms of mass, iron is the fourth most common element within the Earth's crust. It is found in many minerals, such as hematite, magnetite, and taconite. Iron is commercially produced by heating these minerals in a blast furnace with coke and calcium carbonate.

Ruthenium is a very rare metal in Earth's crust. It is often found in minerals such as pentlandite and pyroxinite. It can be commercially obtained as a waste product from refining nickel.

Osmium is found in osmiridium. It can also be obtained as a waste product from refining nickel.

Hassium is extremely radioactive, and as such is not found naturally in the Earth's crust. It is produced via the bombardment of lead-208 atoms with iron-58 atoms.

== Biological role ==
Iron is a mineral used in the human body that is essential for good health. It is a component in the proteins of hemoglobin and myoglobin, both of which are responsible for transporting oxygen around the body. Iron is a part of some hormones as well. A lack of iron in the body can cause iron deficiency anemia, and an excess of iron in the body can be toxic.

Some ruthenium-containing molecules may be used to fight cancer. Normally, however, ruthenium plays no role in the human body.

Both osmium and hassium have no known biological roles.
