= Group 12 element =

Group of chemical elements

Group 12 in the periodic table
Hydrogen																															Helium
Lithium	Beryllium																									Boron	Carbon	Nitrogen	Oxygen	Fluorine	Neon
Sodium	Magnesium																									Aluminium	Silicon	Phosphorus	Sulfur	Chlorine	Argon
Potassium	Calcium															Scandium	Titanium	Vanadium	Chromium	Manganese	Iron	Cobalt	Nickel	Copper	Zinc	Gallium	Germanium	Arsenic	Selenium	Bromine	Krypton
Rubidium	Strontium															Yttrium	Zirconium	Niobium	Molybdenum	Technetium	Ruthenium	Rhodium	Palladium	Silver	Cadmium	Indium	Tin	Antimony	Tellurium	Iodine	Xenon
Caesium	Barium	Lanthanum	Cerium	Praseodymium	Neodymium	Promethium	Samarium	Europium	Gadolinium	Terbium	Dysprosium	Holmium	Erbium	Thulium	Ytterbium	Lutetium	Hafnium	Tantalum	Tungsten	Rhenium	Osmium	Iridium	Platinum	Gold	Mercury (element)	Thallium	Lead	Bismuth	Polonium	Astatine	Radon
Francium	Radium	Actinium	Thorium	Protactinium	Uranium	Neptunium	Plutonium	Americium	Curium	Berkelium	Californium	Einsteinium	Fermium	Mendelevium	Nobelium	Lawrencium	Rutherfordium	Dubnium	Seaborgium	Bohrium	Hassium	Meitnerium	Darmstadtium	Roentgenium	Copernicium	Nihonium	Flerovium	Moscovium	Livermorium	Tennessine	Oganesson
group 11 ← → boron group
IUPAC group number	12
Name by element	zinc group
CAS group number (US, pattern A-B-A)	IIB
old IUPAC number (Europe, pattern A-B)	IIB

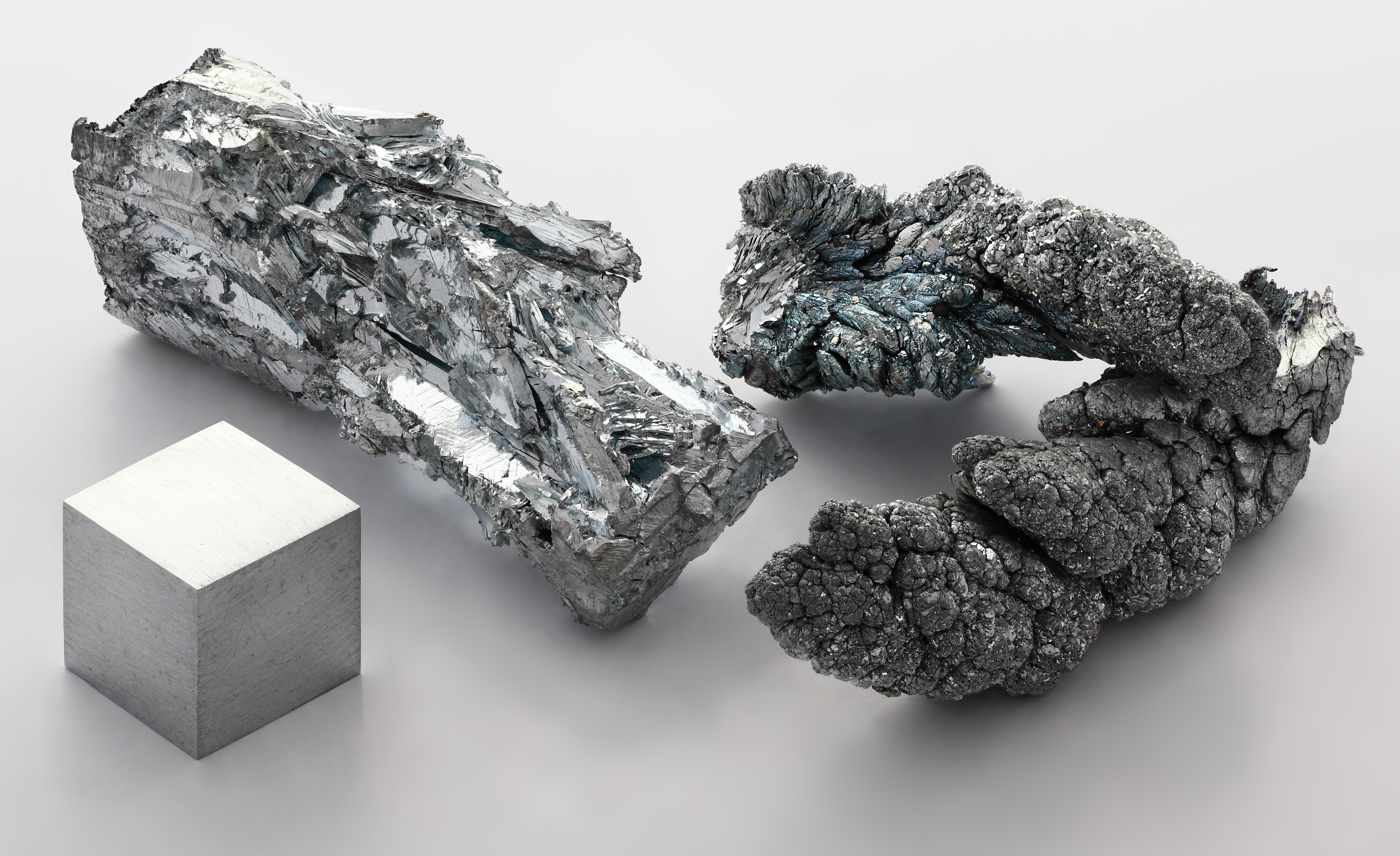
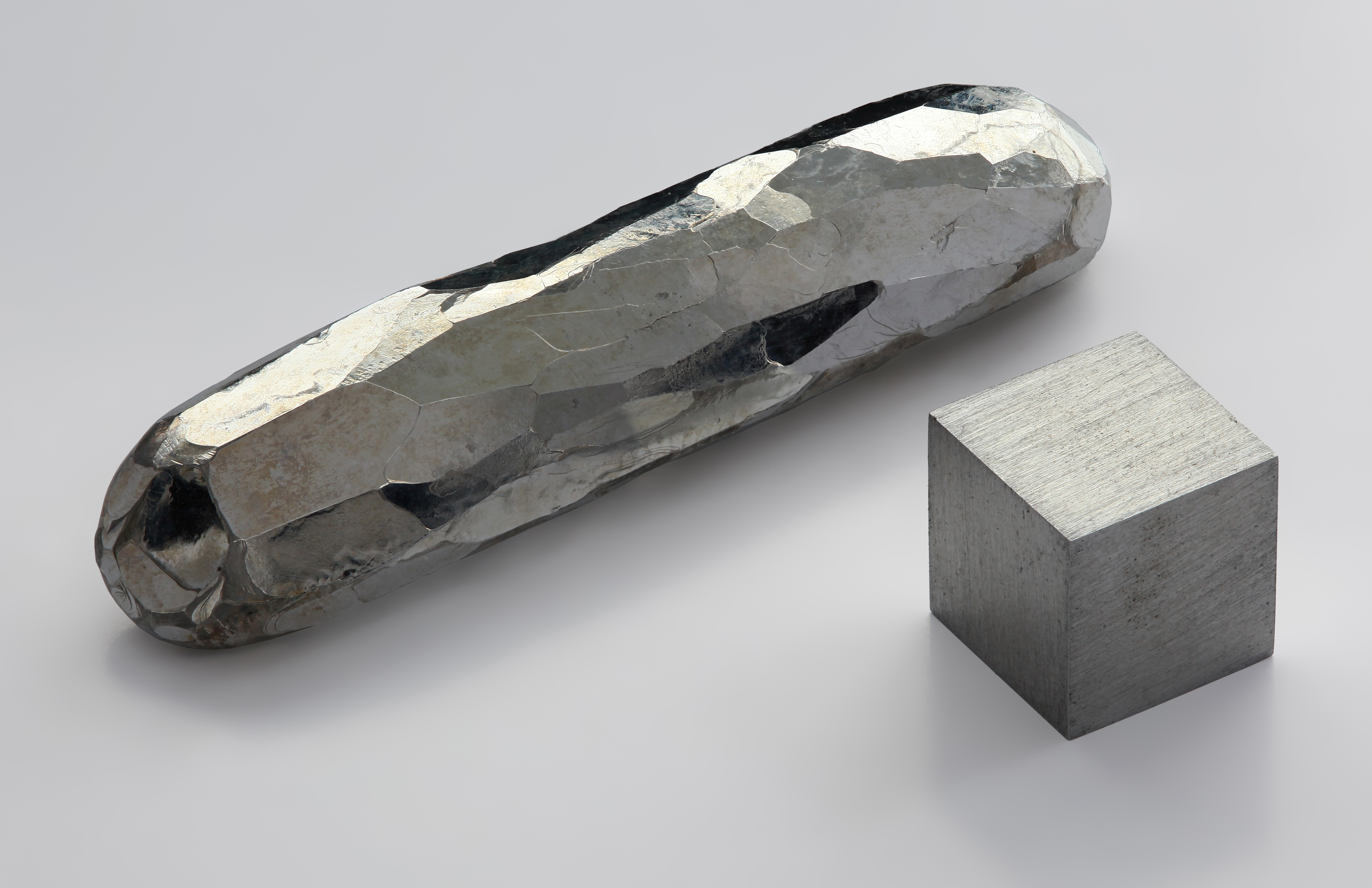
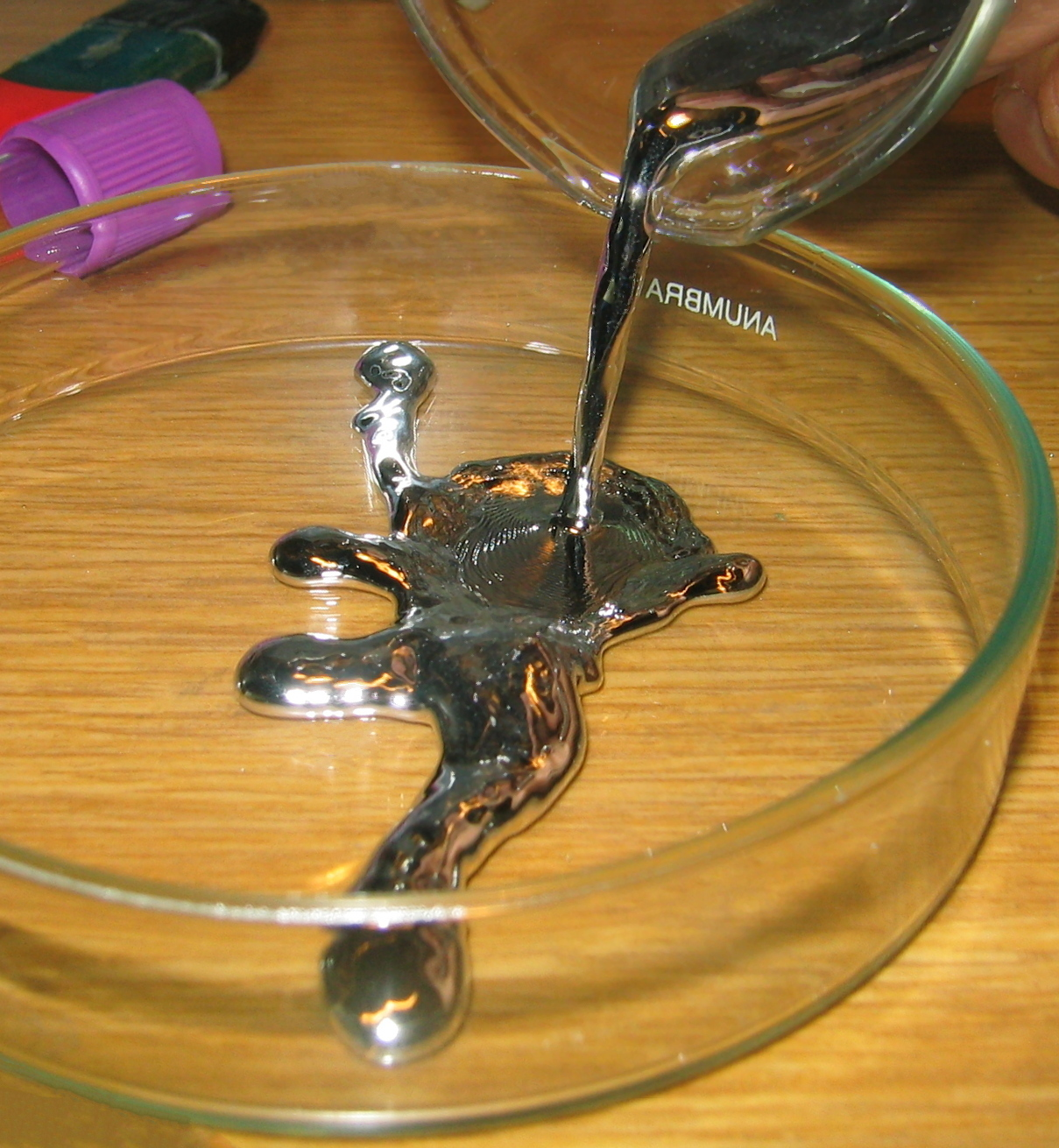
↓ Period
4	Zinc (Zn); 30 Transition metal
5	Cadmium (Cd); 48 Transition metal
6	Mercury (Hg); 80 Transition metal
7	Copernicium (Cn); 112 transition metal
Legend primordial element synthetic element

Group 12, by modern IUPAC numbering, is a group of chemical elements in the periodic table. It includes zinc (Zn), cadmium (Cd), mercury (Hg), and copernicium (Cn). Formerly this group was named IIB (pronounced as "group two B", as the "II" is a Roman numeral) by CAS and old IUPAC system. (Note: The name volatile metals for group 12 has occasionally been used, although this much more commonly refers to any metal having a high volatility.)

The three group 12 elements that occur naturally are zinc, cadmium and mercury. They are all widely used in electric and electronic applications, as well as in various alloys. The first two members of the group share similar properties as they are solid metals under standard conditions. Mercury is the only metal that is known to be a liquid at room temperature – as copernicium's boiling point has not yet been measured accurately enough, (Note: 340±10 K predicted, 357+112 −108 K experimentally) it is not yet known whether it is a liquid or a gas under standard conditions. While zinc is very important in the biochemistry of living organisms, cadmium and mercury are both highly toxic. As copernicium does not occur in nature, it has to be synthesized in the laboratory.

Due to their complete d-shell they are sometimes excluded from the transition metals.

== Physical and atomic properties ==
Like other groups of the periodic table, the members of group 12 show patterns in its electron configuration, especially the outermost shells, which result in trends in their chemical behavior:

Z	Element	Electrons per shell
30	zinc	2, 8, 18, 2
48	cadmium	2, 8, 18, 18, 2
80	mercury	2, 8, 18, 32, 18, 2
112	copernicium	2, 8, 18, 32, 32, 18, 2 (predicted)

The group 12 elements are all soft, diamagnetic, divalent metals. They have the lowest melting points among all transition metals. Zinc is bluish-white and lustrous, though most common commercial grades of the metal have a dull finish. Zinc is also referred to in nonscientific contexts as spelter. Cadmium is soft, malleable, ductile, and with a bluish-white color. Mercury is a liquid, heavy, silvery-white metal. It is the only common liquid metal at ordinary temperatures, and as compared to other metals, it is a poor conductor of heat, but a fair conductor of electricity.

The table below is a summary of the key physical properties of the group 12 elements. The data for copernicium is based on relativistic density-functional theory simulations.

Properties of the group 12 elements
Name	Zinc	Cadmium	Mercury	Copernicium
Melting point	693 K (420 °C)	594 K (321 °C)	234 K (−39 °C)	283±11 K (10 °C)
Boiling point	1180 K (907 °C)	1040 K (767 °C)	630 K (357 °C)	340±10 K (60 °C)
Density	7.14 g·cm^{−3}	8.65 g·cm^{−3}	13.534 g·cm^{−3}	14.0 g·cm^{−3}
Appearance	silvery bluish-gray	silver-gray	silvery	?
Atomic radius	135 pm	155 pm	150 pm	? 147 pm

Zinc is somewhat less dense than iron and has a hexagonal crystal structure. The metal is hard and brittle at most temperatures but becomes malleable between 100 and 150 °C (212 and 302 °F). Above 210 °C (410 °F), the metal becomes brittle again and can be pulverized by beating. Zinc is a fair conductor of electricity. For a metal, zinc has relatively low melting (419.5 °C, 787.1 °F) and boiling points (907 °C, 1,665 °F). Cadmium is similar in many respects to zinc but forms complex compounds. Unlike other metals, cadmium is resistant to corrosion and as a result it is used as a protective layer when deposited on other metals. As a bulk metal, cadmium is insoluble in water and is not flammable; however, in its powdered form it may burn and release toxic fumes. Mercury has an exceptionally low melting temperature for a d-block metal. A complete explanation of this fact requires a deep excursion into quantum physics, but it can be summarized as follows: mercury has a unique electronic configuration where electrons fill up all the available 1s, 2s, 2p, 3s, 3p, 3d, 4s, 4p, 4d, 4f, 5s, 5p, 5d and 6s subshells. As such configuration strongly resists removal of an electron, mercury behaves similarly to noble gas elements, which form weak bonds and thus easily melting solids. The stability of the 6s shell is due to the presence of a filled 4f shell. An f shell poorly screens the nuclear charge that increases the attractive Coulomb interaction of the 6s shell and the nucleus (see lanthanide contraction). The absence of a filled inner f shell is the reason for the somewhat higher melting temperature of cadmium and zinc, although both these metals still melt easily and, in addition, have unusually low boiling points. Gold has atoms with one less 6s electron than mercury. Those electrons are more easily removed and are shared between the gold atoms forming relatively strong metallic bonds.

Zinc, cadmium and mercury form a large range of alloys. Among the zinc containing ones, brass is an alloy of zinc and copper. Other metals long known to form binary alloys with zinc are aluminium, antimony, bismuth, gold, iron, lead, mercury, silver, tin, magnesium, cobalt, nickel, tellurium and sodium. While neither zinc nor zirconium are ferromagnetic, their alloy ZrZn_{2} exhibits ferromagnetism below 35 K. Cadmium is used in many kinds of solder and bearing alloys, due to a low coefficient of friction and fatigue resistance. It is also found in some of the lowest-melting alloys, such as Wood's metal. Because it is a liquid, mercury dissolves other metals and the alloys that are formed are called amalgams. For example, such amalgams are known with gold, zinc, sodium, and many other metals. Because iron is an exception, iron flasks have been traditionally used to trade mercury. Other metals that do not form amalgams with mercury include tantalum, tungsten and platinum. Sodium amalgam is a common reducing agent in organic synthesis, and is also used in high-pressure sodium lamps. Mercury readily combines with aluminium to form a mercury-aluminium amalgam when the two pure metals come into contact. Since the amalgam reacts with air to give aluminium oxide, small amounts of mercury corrode aluminium. For this reason, mercury is not allowed aboard an aircraft under most circumstances because of the risk of it forming an amalgam with exposed aluminium parts in the aircraft.

== Chemistry ==
Most of the chemistry has been observed only for the first three members of group 12. The chemistry of copernicium is not well established and therefore the rest of the section deals only with zinc, cadmium and mercury.

=== Periodic trends ===
All elements in this group are metals. The similarity of the metallic radii of cadmium and mercury is an effect of the lanthanide contraction. So, the trend in this group is unlike the trend in group 2, the alkaline earths, where metallic radius increases smoothly from top to bottom of the group. All three metals have relatively low melting and boiling points, indicating that the metallic bond is relatively weak, with relatively little overlap between the valence band and the conduction band. Thus, zinc is close to the boundary between metallic and metalloid elements, which is usually placed between gallium and germanium, though gallium participates in semi-conductors such as gallium arsenide.

Zinc and cadmium are electropositive while mercury is not. As a result, zinc and cadmium metal are good reducing agents. The elements of group 12 have an oxidation state of +2 in which the ions have the rather stable d^{10} electronic configuration, with a full sub-shell. However, mercury can easily be reduced to the +1 oxidation state; usually, as in the ion Hg^{2+}_{2}, two mercury(I) ions come together to form a metal-metal bond and a diamagnetic species. Cadmium can also form species such as [Cd_{2}Cl_{6}]^{4−} in which the metal's oxidation state is +1. Just as with mercury, the formation of a metal-metal bond results in a diamagnetic compound in which there are no unpaired electrons; thus, making the species very reactive. Zinc(I) is known mostly in the gas phase, in such compounds as linear Zn_{2}Cl_{2}, analogous to calomel. In the solid phase, the rather exotic compound decamethyldizincocene (Cp*Zn–ZnCp*) is known.

=== Classification ===
The elements in group 12 are usually considered to be d-block elements, but not transition elements as the d-shell is full. Some authors classify these elements as main-group elements because the valence electrons are in ns^{2} orbitals. Nevertheless, they share many characteristics with the neighboring group 11 elements on the periodic table, which are almost universally considered to be transition elements. For example, zinc shares many characteristics with the neighboring transition metal, copper. Zinc complexes merit inclusion in the Irving-Williams series as zinc forms many complexes with the same stoichiometry as complexes of copper(II), albeit with smaller stability constants. There is little similarity between cadmium and silver as compounds of silver(II) are rare and those that do exist are very strong oxidizing agents. Likewise the common oxidation state for gold is +3, which precludes there being much common chemistry between mercury and gold, though there are similarities between mercury(I) and gold(I) such as the formation of linear dicyano complexes, [M(CN)_{2}]^{−}. According to IUPAC's definition of transition metal as an element whose atom has an incomplete d sub-shell, or which can give rise to cations with an incomplete d sub-shell, zinc and cadmium are not transition metals, while mercury is. This is because only mercury is known to have a compound where its oxidation state is higher than +2, in mercury(IV) fluoride (though its existence is disputed, as later experiments trying to confirm its synthesis could not find evidence of HgF_{4}). However, this classification is based on one highly atypical compound seen at non-equilibrium conditions and is at odds to mercury's more typical chemistry, and Jensen has suggested that it would be better to regard mercury as not being a transition metal.

=== Relationship with the alkaline earth metals ===
Although group 12 lies in the d-block of the modern 18-column periodic table, the d electrons of zinc, cadmium, and (almost always) mercury behave as core electrons and do not take part in bonding. This behavior is similar to that of the main-group elements, but is in stark contrast to that of the neighboring group 11 elements (copper, silver, and gold), which also have filled d-subshells in their ground-state electron configuration but behave chemically as transition metals. For example, the bonding in chromium(II) sulfide (CrS) involves mainly the 3d electrons; that in iron(II) sulfide (FeS) involves both the 3d and 4s electrons; but that of zinc sulfide (ZnS) involves only the 4s electrons and the 3d electrons behave as core electrons. Indeed, useful comparison can be made between their properties and the first two members of group 2, beryllium and magnesium, and in earlier short-form periodic table layouts, this relationship is illustrated more clearly. For instance, zinc and cadmium are similar to beryllium and magnesium in their atomic radii, ionic radii, electronegativities, and also in the structure of their binary compounds and their ability to form complex ions with many nitrogen and oxygen ligands, such as complex hydrides and amines. However, beryllium and magnesium are small atoms, unlike the heavier alkaline earth metals and like the group 12 elements (which have a greater nuclear charge but the same number of valence electrons), and the periodic trends down group 2 from beryllium to radium (similar to that of the alkali metals) are not as smooth when going down from beryllium to mercury (which is more similar to that of the p-block main groups) due to the d-block and lanthanide contractions. It is also the d-block and lanthanide contractions that give mercury many of its distinctive properties.

Comparison of the properties of the alkaline earth metals and the group 12 elements (predictions for copernicium)
Name	Beryllium	Magnesium	Calcium	Strontium	Barium	Radium
Valence electron configuration	2s^{2}	3s^{2}	4s^{2}	5s^{2}	6s^{2}	7s^{2}
Core electron configuration	[He]	[Ne]	[Ar]	[Kr]	[Xe]	[Rn]
Oxidation states (Note: See list of oxidation states of the elements. Oxidation states in bold are common.)	+2, +1	+2, +1	+2, +1	+2, +1	+2	+2
Melting point	1560 K (1287 °C)	923 K (650 °C)	1115 K (842 °C)	1050 K (777 °C)	1000 K (727 °C)	973 K (700 °C)
Boiling point	2742 K (2469 °C)	1363 K (1090 °C)	1757 K (1484 °C)	1655 K (1382 °C)	2170 K (1897 °C)	2010 K (1737 °C)
Appearance	white-gray metallic	shiny gray metallic	dull silver-gray	silvery white metallic	silvery gray	silvery white metallic
Density	1.85 g·cm^{−3}	1.738 g·cm^{−3}	1.55 g·cm^{−3}	2.64 g·cm^{−3}	3.51 g·cm^{−3}	5.5 g·cm^{−3}
Pauling electronegativity	1.57	1.31	1.00	0.95	0.89	0.9
Atomic radius	105 pm	150 pm	180 pm	200 pm	215 pm	215 pm
Crystal ionic radius	59 pm	86 pm	114 pm	132 pm	149 pm	162 pm
Flame test color	white	brilliant white	brick-red	crimson	apple green	crimson red (Note: The color of the flame test of pure radium has never been observed; the crimson red color is an extrapolation from the flame test color of its compounds.)
Organometallic chemistry	good	good	poor	very poor	very poor	extremely poor
Hydroxide	amphoteric	basic	basic	strongly basic	strongly basic	strongly basic
Oxide	amphoteric	strongly basic	strongly basic	strongly basic	strongly basic	strongly basic
Name	Beryllium	Magnesium	Zinc	Cadmium	Mercury	Copernicium
Valence electron configuration	2s^{2}	3s^{2}	4s^{2}	5s^{2}	6s^{2}	? 7s^{2}
Core electron configuration	[He]	[Ne]	[Ar]3d^{10}	[Kr]4d^{10}	[Xe]4f^{14}5d^{10}	? [Rn]5f^{14}6d^{10}
Oxidation states	+2, +1	+2, +1	+2, +1	+2, +1	+2, +1	? +4, +2, +1, 0
Melting point	1560 K (1287 °C)	923 K (650 °C)	693 K (420 °C)	594 K (321 °C)	234 K (−39 °C)	283±11 K (10 °C)
Boiling point	2742 K (2469 °C)	1363 K (1090 °C)	1180 K (907 °C)	1040 K (767 °C)	630 K (357 °C)	340±10 K (60 °C)
Appearance	white-gray metallic	shiny gray metallic	silvery bluish-gray metallic	silver-gray	silvery	?
Density	1.85 g·cm^{−3}	1.738 g·cm^{−3}	7.14 g·cm^{−3}	8.65 g·cm^{−3}	13.534 g·cm^{−3}	14.0 g·cm^{−3}
Pauling electronegativity	1.57	1.31	1.65	1.69	2.00	?
Atomic radius	105 pm	150 pm	135 pm	155 pm	150 pm	? 147 pm
Crystal ionic radius	59 pm	86 pm	88 pm	109 pm	116 pm	? 75 pm
Flame test color	white	brilliant white	bluish-green (Note: Sometimes reported as white.)	?	?	?
Organometallic chemistry	good	good	good	good	good	?
Hydroxide	amphoteric	basic	amphoteric	weakly basic	?	?
Oxide	amphoteric	strongly basic	amphoteric	mildly basic	mildly basic	?

=== Compounds ===
All three metal ions form many tetrahedral species, such as MCl^{2−}_{4}. Both zinc and cadmium can also form octahedral complexes such as the aqua ions [M(H_{2}O)_{6}]^{2+} which are present in aqueous solutions of salts of these metals. Covalent character is achieved by using the s and p orbitals. Mercury, however, rarely exceeds a coordination number of four. Coordination numbers of 2, 3, 5, 7 and 8 are also known.

== History ==
The elements of group 12 have been found throughout history, being used since ancient times to being discovered in laboratories. The group itself has not acquired a trivial name, but it has been called group IIB in the past.

=== Zinc ===
Zinc has been found being used in impure forms in ancient times as well as in alloys such as brass that have been found to be over 2000 years old. Zinc was distinctly recognized as a metal under the designation of Fasada in the medical Lexicon ascribed to the Hindu king Madanapala (of Taka dynasty) and written about the year 1374. The metal was also of use to alchemists. The name of the metal was first documented in the 16th century, and is probably derived from the German zinke for the needle-like appearance of metallic crystals.

Alchemical symbol for the element zinc

The isolation of metallic zinc in the West may have been achieved independently by several people in the 17th century. German chemist Andreas Marggraf is usually given credit for discovering pure metallic zinc in a 1746 experiment by heating a mixture of calamine and charcoal in a closed vessel without copper to obtain a metal. Experiments on frogs by the Italian doctor Luigi Galvani in 1780 with brass paved the way for the discovery of electrical batteries, galvanization and cathodic protection. In 1799, Galvani's friend, Alessandro Volta, invented the Voltaic pile. The biological importance of zinc was not discovered until 1940 when carbonic anhydrase, an enzyme that scrubs carbon dioxide from blood, was shown to have zinc in its active site.

=== Cadmium ===
In 1817, cadmium was discovered in Germany as an impurity in zinc carbonate minerals (calamine) by Friedrich Stromeyer and Karl Samuel Leberecht Hermann. It was named after the Latin cadmia for "calamine", a cadmium-bearing mixture of minerals, which was in turn named after the Greek mythological character, Κάδμος Cadmus, the founder of Thebes. Stromeyer eventually isolated cadmium metal by roasting and reduction of the sulfide.

In 1927, the International Conference on Weights and Measures redefined the meter in terms of a red cadmium spectral line (1 m = 1,553,164.13 wavelengths). This definition has since been changed (see krypton). At the same time, the International Prototype Meter was used as standard for the length of a meter until 1960, when at the General Conference on Weights and Measures the meter was defined in terms of the orange-red emission line in the electromagnetic spectrum of the krypton-86 atom in vacuum.

=== Mercury ===
The symbol for the planet Mercury (☿) has been used since ancient times to represent the element.

Mercury has been found in Egyptian tombs which have been dated back to 1500 BC, where mercury was used in cosmetics. It was also used by the ancient Chinese who believed it would improve and prolong health. By 500 BC mercury was used to make amalgams (Medieval Latin amalgama, "alloy of mercury") with other metals. Alchemists thought of mercury as the First Matter from which all metals were formed. They believed that different metals could be produced by varying the quality and quantity of sulfur contained within the mercury. The purest of these was gold, and mercury was called for in attempts at the transmutation of base (or impure) metals into gold, which was the goal of many alchemists.

Hg is the modern chemical symbol for mercury. It comes from hydrargyrum, a Latinized form of the Greek word Ύδραργυρος (hydrargyros), which is a compound word meaning "water-silver" (hydr- = water, argyros = silver) — since it is liquid like water and shiny like silver. The element was named after the Roman god Mercury, known for speed and mobility. It is associated with the planet Mercury; the astrological symbol for the planet is also one of the alchemical symbols for the metal. Mercury is the only metal for which the alchemical planetary name became the common name.

=== Copernicium ===
The heaviest known group 12 element, copernicium, was first created on February 9, 1996, at the Gesellschaft für Schwerionenforschung (GSI) in Darmstadt, Germany, by Sigurd Hofmann, Victor Ninov et al. It was then officially named by the International Union of Pure and Applied Chemistry (IUPAC) after Nicolaus Copernicus on February 19, 2010, the 537th anniversary of Copernicus' birth.

== Occurrence ==
Like in most other d-block groups, the abundance in Earth's crust of group 12 elements decreases with higher atomic number. Zinc is with 65 parts per million (ppm) the most abundant in the group while cadmium with 0.1 ppm and mercury with 0.08 ppm are orders of magnitude less abundant. Copernicium, as a synthetic element with a half-life of a few minutes, may only be present in the laboratories where it was produced.

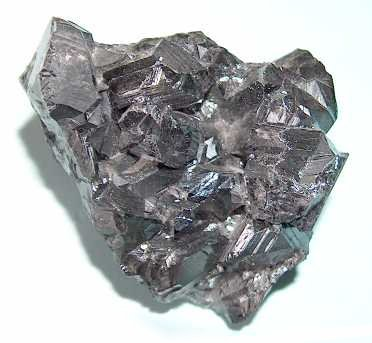
Sphalerite (ZnS), an important zinc ore

Group 12 metals are chalcophiles, meaning the elements have low affinities for oxides and prefer to bond with sulfides. Chalcophiles formed as the crust solidified under the reducing conditions of the early Earth's atmosphere. The commercially most important minerals of group 12 elements are sulfide minerals. Sphalerite, which is a form of zinc sulfide, is the most heavily mined zinc-containing ore because its concentrate contains 60–62% zinc. No significant deposits of cadmium-containing ores are known. Greenockite (CdS), the only cadmium mineral of importance, is nearly always associated with sphalerite (ZnS). This association is caused by the geochemical similarity between zinc and cadmium which makes geological separation unlikely. As a consequence, cadmium is produced mainly as a byproduct from mining, smelting, and refining sulfidic ores of zinc, and, to a lesser degree, lead and copper. One place where metallic cadmium can be found is the Vilyuy River basin in Siberia. Although mercury is an extremely rare element in the Earth's crust, because it does not blend geochemically with those elements that constitute the majority of the crustal mass, mercury ores can be highly concentrated considering the element's abundance in ordinary rock. The richest mercury ores contain up to 2.5% mercury by mass, and even the leanest concentrated deposits are at least 0.1% mercury (12,000 times average crustal abundance). It is found either as a native metal (rare) or in cinnabar (HgS), corderoite, livingstonite and other minerals, with cinnabar being the most common ore.

While mercury and zinc minerals are found in large enough quantities to be mined, cadmium is too similar to zinc and therefore is always present in small quantities in zinc ores from where it is recovered. Identified world zinc resources total about 1.9 billion tonnes. Large deposits are in Australia, Canada and the United States with the largest reserves in Iran. At the current rate of consumption, these reserves are estimated to be depleted sometime between 2027 and 2055. About 346 million tonnes have been extracted throughout history to 2002, and one estimate found that about 109 million tonnes of that remains in use. In 2005, China was the top producer of mercury with almost two-thirds global share followed by Kyrgyzstan. Several other countries are believed to have unrecorded production of mercury from copper electrowinning processes and by recovery from effluents. Because of the high toxicity of mercury, both the mining of cinnabar and refining for mercury are hazardous and historic causes of mercury poisoning.

== Production ==
Zinc is the fourth most common metal in use, trailing only iron, aluminium, and copper with an annual production of about 10 million tonnes. Worldwide, 95% of the zinc is mined from sulfidic ore deposits, in which sphalerite (ZnS) is nearly always mixed with the sulfides of copper, lead and iron. Zinc metal is produced using extractive metallurgy. Roasting converts the zinc sulfide concentrate produced during processing to zinc oxide. For further processing two basic methods are used: pyrometallurgy or electrowinning. Pyrometallurgy processing reduces zinc oxide with carbon or carbon monoxide at 950 °C (1,740 °F) into the metal, which is distilled as zinc vapor. The zinc vapor is collected in a condenser. Electrowinning processing leaches zinc from the ore concentrate by sulfuric acid. After this step electrolysis is used to produce zinc metal.

Cadmium is a common impurity in zinc ores, and it is most isolated during the production of zinc. Some zinc ores concentrates from sulfidic zinc ores contain up to 1.4% of cadmium. Cadmium is isolated from the zinc produced from the flue dust by vacuum distillation if the zinc is smelted, or cadmium sulfate is precipitated out of the electrolysis solution.

The richest mercury ores contain up to 2.5% mercury by mass, and even the leanest concentrated deposits are at least 0.1% mercury, with cinnabar (HgS) being the most common ore in the deposits. Mercury is extracted by heating cinnabar in a current of air and condensing the vapor.

Superheavy elements such as copernicium are produced by bombarding lighter elements in particle accelerators that induces fusion reactions. Whereas most of the isotopes of copernicium can be synthesized directly this way, some heavier ones have only been observed as decay products of elements with higher atomic numbers. The first fusion reaction to produce copernicium was performed by GSI in 1996, who reported the detection of two decay chains of copernicium-277 (though one was later retracted, as it had been based on data fabricated by Victor Ninov):

^{208}_{82}Pb + ^{70}_{30}Zn → ^{277}_{112}Cn + n

== Applications ==
Due to the physical similarities which they share, the group 12 elements can be found in many common situations. Zinc and cadmium are commonly used as anti-corrosion (galvanization) agents as they will attract all local oxidation until they completely corrode. These protective coatings can be applied to other metals by hot-dip galvanizing a substance into the molten form of the metal, or through the process of electroplating which may be passivated by the use of chromate salts. Group 12 elements are also used in electrochemistry as they may act as an alternative to the standard hydrogen electrode in addition to being a secondary reference electrode.

In the US, zinc is used predominantly for galvanizing (55%) and for brass, bronze and other alloys (37%). The relative reactivity of zinc and its ability to attract oxidation to itself makes it an efficient sacrificial anode in cathodic protection (CP). For example, cathodic protection of a buried pipeline can be achieved by connecting anodes made from zinc to the pipe. Zinc acts as the anode (negative terminus) by slowly corroding away as it passes electric current to the steel pipeline. (Note: Electric current will naturally flow between zinc and steel but in some circumstances inert anodes are used with an external DC source.) Zinc is used to cathodically protect metals that are exposed to sea water from corrosion. Zinc is used as an anode material for batteries such as in zinc–carbon batteries or zinc–air battery/fuel cells. A widely used alloy which contains zinc is brass, in which copper is alloyed with anywhere from 3% to 45% zinc, depending upon the type of brass. Brass is generally more ductile and stronger than copper and has superior corrosion resistance. These properties make it useful in communication equipment, hardware, musical instruments, and water valves. Other widely used alloys that contain zinc include nickel silver, typewriter metal, soft and aluminium solder, and commercial bronze. Alloys of primarily zinc with small amounts of copper, aluminium, and magnesium are useful in die casting as well as spin casting, especially in the automotive, electrical, and hardware industries. These alloys are marketed under the name Zamak. Roughly one quarter of all zinc output in the United States (2009) is consumed in the form of zinc compounds, a variety of which are used industrially.

Cadmium has many common industrial uses as it is a key component in battery production, is present in cadmium pigments, coatings, and is commonly used in electroplating. In 2009, 86% of cadmium was used in batteries, predominantly in rechargeable nickel-cadmium batteries. The European Union banned the use of cadmium in electronics in 2004 with several exceptions but reduced the allowed content of cadmium in electronics to 0.002%. Cadmium electroplating, consuming 6% of the global production, can be found in the aircraft industry due to the ability to resist corrosion when applied to steel components.

Mercury is used primarily for the manufacture of industrial chemicals or for electrical and electronic applications. It is used in some thermometers, especially ones which are used to measure high temperatures. A still increasing amount is used as gaseous mercury in fluorescent lamps, while most of the other applications are slowly phased out due to health and safety regulations, and is in some applications replaced with less toxic but considerably more expensive Galinstan alloy. Mercury and its compounds have been used in medicine, although they are much less common today than they once were, now that the toxic effects of mercury and its compounds are more widely understood. It is still used as an ingredient in dental amalgams. In the late 20th century the largest use of mercury was in the mercury cell process (also called the Castner-Kellner process) in the production of chlorine and caustic soda.

Copernicium has no use other than research due to its very high radioactivity.

== Biological role and toxicity ==
The group 12 elements have multiple effects on biological organisms as cadmium and mercury are toxic while zinc is required by most plants and animals in trace amounts.

Zinc is an essential trace element, necessary for plants, animals, and microorganisms. It is "typically the second most abundant transition metal in organisms" after iron and it is the only metal which appears in all enzyme classes. There are 2–4 grams of zinc distributed throughout the human body, and it plays "ubiquitous biological roles". A 2006 study estimated that about 10% of human proteins (2800) potentially bind zinc, in addition to hundreds which transport and traffic zinc. In the U.S., the Recommended Dietary Allowance (RDA) is 8 mg/day for women and 11 mg/day for men. Harmful excessive supplementation may be a problem and should probably not exceed 20 mg/day in healthy people, although the U.S. National Research Council set a Tolerable Upper Intake of 40 mg/day.

Mercury and cadmium are toxic and may cause environmental damage if they enter rivers or rain water. This may result in contaminated crops as well as the bioaccumulation of mercury in a food chain leading to an increase in illnesses caused by mercury and cadmium poisoning.

== Bibliography ==
- Cotton, F. Albert; Wilkinson, Geoffrey; Murillo, Carlos A.; Bochmann, Manfred (1999). Advanced Inorganic Chemistry (6th ed.). New York: John Wiley & Sons, Inc. ISBN 978-0-471-19957-1.
- Emsley, John (2001). "Zinc". Nature's Building Blocks: An A-Z Guide to the Elements. Oxford, England, UK: Oxford University Press. pp. 499–505. ISBN 978-0-19-850340-8.
- Greenwood, Norman N.; Earnshaw, Alan (1997). Chemistry of the Elements (2nd ed.). Butterworth-Heinemann. doi:10.1016/C2009-0-30414-6. ISBN 978-0-08-037941-8.
- Lehto, R. S. (1968). "Zinc". In Clifford A. Hampel (ed.). The Encyclopedia of the Chemical Elements. New York: Reinhold Book Corporation. pp. 822–830. ISBN 978-0-442-15598-8. LCCN 68-29938.
- Stwertka, Albert (1998). "Zinc". Guide to the Elements (Revised ed.). Oxford University Press. ISBN 978-0-19-508083-4.
- Weeks, Mary Elvira (1933). "III. Some Eighteenth-Century Metals". The Discovery of the Elements. Easton, PA: Journal of Chemical Education. ISBN 978-0-7661-3872-8.
