= Low valent magnesium compounds =

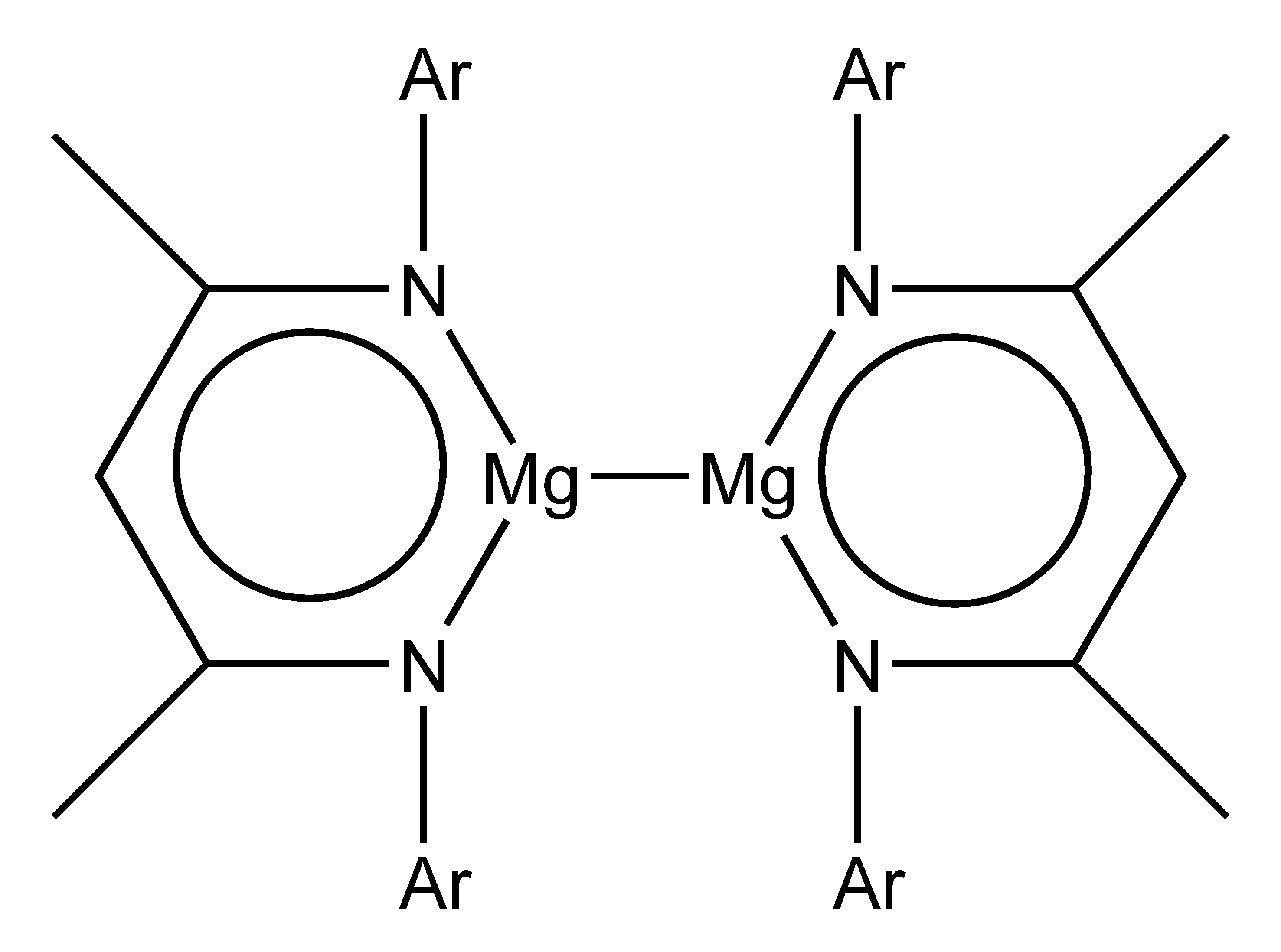
An example (doesn't reflect bond angle)

A number of stable low valent magnesium compounds containing a metal-metal, Mg-Mg, bond, where magnesium exhibits the formal oxidation state of +1 are known. These compounds generally have the formula L_{2}Mg_{2}, where L represents a bulky ligand. The first examples of these stable magnesium(I) compounds were reported in 2007. The chemistry of Mg is dominated by the +2 oxidation state and prior to 2007 only examples of crystalline compounds with short Mg-Mg distances that may indicate an Mg-Mg bond were known, such as the ternary metal hydrides Mg_{2}RuH_{4}, Mg_{3}RuH_{3}, and Mg_{4}IrH_{5} and magnesium diboride, Calculations had also indicated the stability of the Mg_{2}^{2+} cation.

The preparation of the first compounds made involved the reduction of Mg^{II} iodine complexes with potassium metal and the bulky ligands were:

- a guanidinate, "priso", [(Ar)NC(NPr^{i}_{2})N(Ar)]^{−} where Ar = 2,6-diisopropylphenyl and Pr^{i} = iso-propyl
- a ketiminate, "nacnac", {[(Ar)NC(Me)]_{2}CH}^{−},- where Ar = 2,6-diisopropylphenyl and Me = methyl

Both examples have the formula L_{2}Mg_{2}, where L represents the bulky anionic bidentate ligand. X-ray crystallographic studies showed an Mg-Mg bond length of 285.1 pm and 284.6 pm. Theoretical studies indicate an essentially ionic formulation Mg_{2}^{2+}(L^{−})_{2}. The Mg_{2}^{2+} ion is the group 2 analogue of the group 12 Hg_{2}^{2+} (present in e.g. mercury(I) chloride) and Cd_{2}^{2+} ions (present in cadmium(I) tetrachloroaluminate).

Since then a variety of stable Mg(I) compounds have been prepared, some melting over 200 °C, some colorless, others colored, but all involving very bulky ligands. Also complexes of the LMgMgL with monodentate ligands have been prepared and in these the coordination of the Mg atom increases from three to four. The magnesium(I) dimers have proved to be useful reducing agents, for example in the preparation of tin(I) compounds.
