= Cadmium =

Cadmium, _{48}Cd
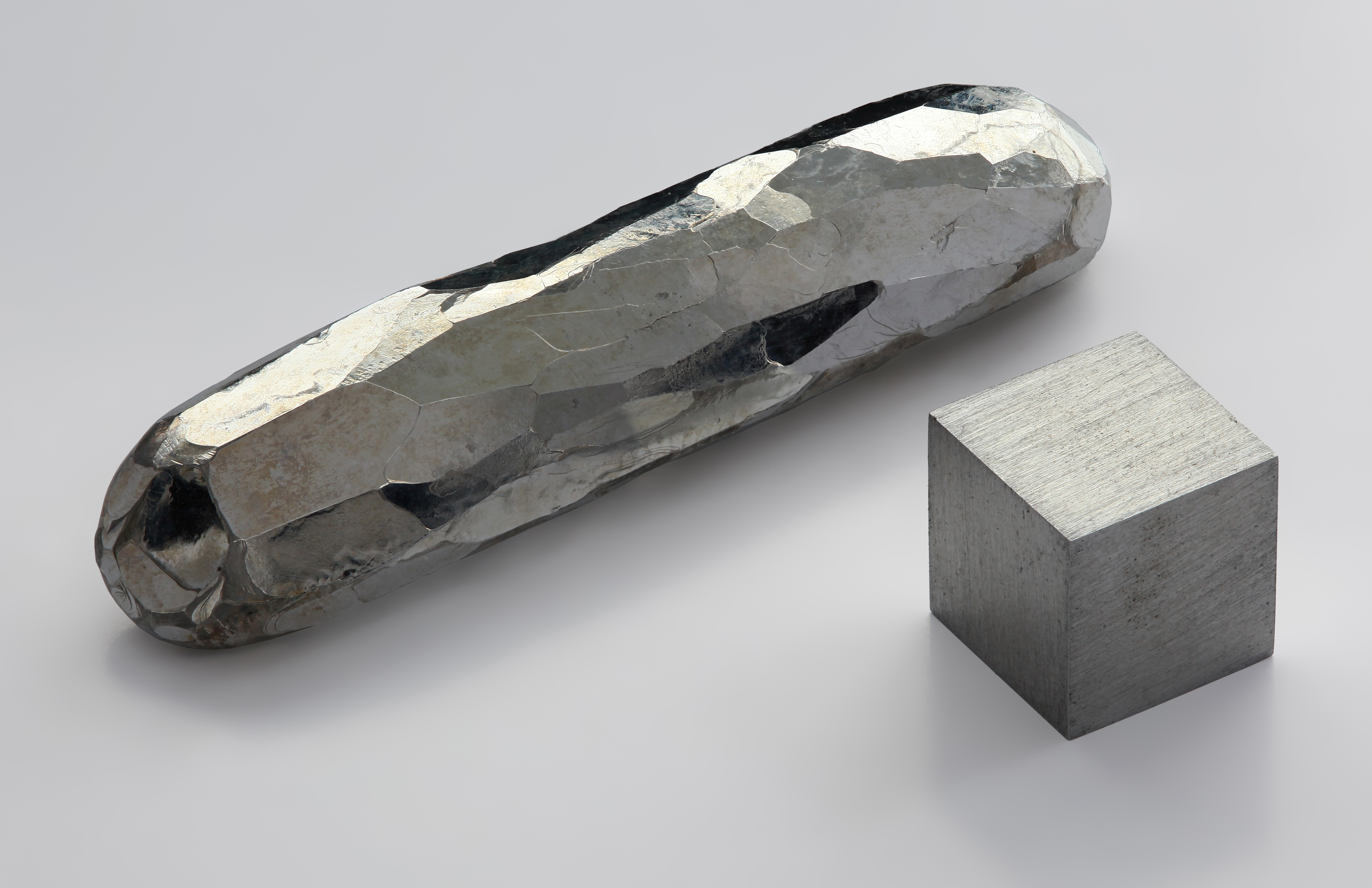

Cadmium
- Pronunciation: /ˈkædmiəm/ (KAD-mee-əm)
- Appearance: silvery bluish-gray metallic

Standard atomic weight A_{r}°(Cd)
- 112.414±0.004; 112.41±0.01 (abridged)

Cadmium in the periodic table
| Hydrogen | | | | | | | | | | | | | | | | | | | | | | | | | | | | | | | Helium |
| Lithium | Beryllium | | | | | | | | | | | | | | | | | | | | | | | | | Boron | Carbon | Nitrogen | Oxygen | Fluorine | Neon |
| Sodium | Magnesium | | | | | | | | | | | | | | | | | | | | | | | | | Aluminium | Silicon | Phosphorus | Sulfur | Chlorine | Argon |
| Potassium | Calcium | | | | | | | | | | | | | | | Scandium | Titanium | Vanadium | Chromium | Manganese | Iron | Cobalt | Nickel | Copper | Zinc | Gallium | Germanium | Arsenic | Selenium | Bromine | Krypton |
| Rubidium | Strontium | | | | | | | | | | | | | | | Yttrium | Zirconium | Niobium | Molybdenum | Technetium | Ruthenium | Rhodium | Palladium | Silver | Cadmium | Indium | Tin | Antimony | Tellurium | Iodine | Xenon |
| Caesium | Barium | Lanthanum | Cerium | Praseodymium | Neodymium | Promethium | Samarium | Europium | Gadolinium | Terbium | Dysprosium | Holmium | Erbium | Thulium | Ytterbium | Lutetium | Hafnium | Tantalum | Tungsten | Rhenium | Osmium | Iridium | Platinum | Gold | Mercury (element) | Thallium | Lead | Bismuth | Polonium | Astatine | Radon |
| Francium | Radium | Actinium | Thorium | Protactinium | Uranium | Neptunium | Plutonium | Americium | Curium | Berkelium | Californium | Einsteinium | Fermium | Mendelevium | Nobelium | Lawrencium | Rutherfordium | Dubnium | Seaborgium | Bohrium | Hassium | Meitnerium | Darmstadtium | Roentgenium | Copernicium | Nihonium | Flerovium | Moscovium | Livermorium | Tennessine | Oganesson |
Zn
↑
Cd
↓
Hg
silver ← cadmium → indium
- Atomic number (Z): 48
- Group: group 12
- Period: period 5
- Block: d-block
- Electron configuration: [Kr] 4d^{10} 5s^{2}
- Electrons per shell: 2, 8, 18, 18, 2

Physical properties
- Phase at STP: solid
- Melting point: 594.22 K (321.07 °C, 609.93 °F)
- Boiling point: 1040 K (767 °C, 1413 °F)
- Density (at 20° C): 8.649 g/cm^{3}
- when liquid (at m.p.): 7.996 g/cm^{3}
- Heat of fusion: 6.21 kJ/mol
- Heat of vaporization: 99.87 kJ/mol
- Molar heat capacity: 26.020 J/(mol·K)
- Specific heat capacity: 231.474 J/(kg·K)
Vapor pressure
| P (Pa) | 1 | 10 | 100 | 1 k | 10 k | 100 k |
|---|---|---|---|---|---|---|
| at T (K) | 530 | 583 | 654 | 745 | 867 | 1040 |

Atomic properties
- Oxidation states: common: +2 −2, 0, +1
- Electronegativity: Pauling scale: 1.69
- Ionization energies: 1st: 867.8 kJ/mol; 2nd: 1631.4 kJ/mol; 3rd: 3616 kJ/mol
- Atomic radius: empirical: 151 pm
- Covalent radius: 144±9 pm
- Van der Waals radius: 158 pm
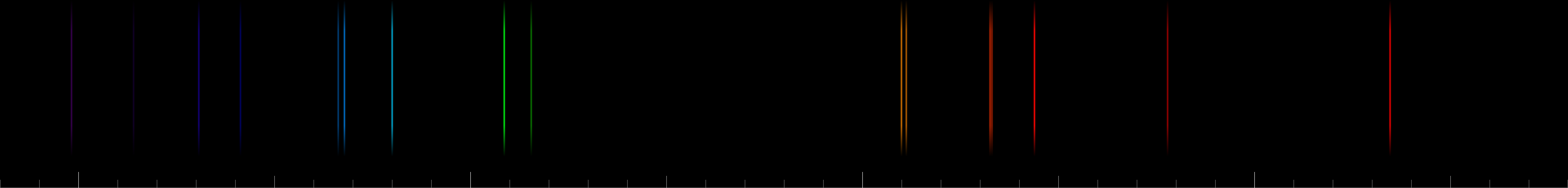
- Spectral lines of cadmium

Other properties
- Natural occurrence: primordial
- Crystal structure: hexagonal close-packed (hcp) (hP2)
- Lattice constants: a = 297.89 pm c = 561.66 pm (at 20 °C)
- Thermal expansion: 30.95×10^{−6}/K (at 20 °C) (Note: The thermal expansion is anisotropic: the parameters (at 20 °C) for each crystal axis are α_{a} = 18.91×10^{−6}/K, α_{c} = 55.03×10^{−6}/K, and α_{average} = α_{V}/3 = 30.95×10^{−6}/K.)
- Thermal conductivity: 96.6 W/(m⋅K)
- Electrical resistivity: 72.7 nΩ⋅m (at 22 °C)
- Magnetic ordering: diamagnetic
- Molar magnetic susceptibility: −19.8×10^{−6} cm^{3}/mol
- Young's modulus: 50 GPa
- Shear modulus: 19 GPa
- Bulk modulus: 42 GPa
- Speed of sound thin rod: 2310 m/s (at 20 °C)
- Poisson ratio: 0.30
- Mohs hardness: 2.0
- Brinell hardness: 203–220 MPa
- CAS Number: 7440-43-9

History
- Naming: after calamine, in which it was found, itself named after Cadmea
- Discovery and first isolation: Karl Samuel Leberecht Hermann and Friedrich Stromeyer (1817)
- Named by: Friedrich Stromeyer (1817)

Isotopes of cadmium
| Main isotopes | | | Decay | |
| Isotope | abundance | half-life (t_{1/2}) | mode | product |
|---|---|---|---|---|
| ^{106}Cd | 1.25% | stable | | |
| ^{108}Cd | 0.89% | stable | | |
| ^{109}Cd | synth | 461.3 d | ε | ^{109}Ag |
| ^{110}Cd | 12.47% | stable | | |
| ^{111}Cd | 12.80% | stable | | |
| ^{112}Cd | 24.11% | stable | | |
| ^{113}Cd | 12.23% | 8.04×10^{15} y | β^{−} | ^{113}In |
| ^{113m}Cd | synth | 13.9 y | β^{−} | ^{113}In |
| ^{113m}Cd | synth | 13.9 y | IT | ^{113}Cd |
| ^{114}Cd | 28.75% | stable | | |
| ^{115m}Cd | synth | 44.56 d | β^{−} | ^{115}In |
| ^{116}Cd | 7.51% | 2.69×10^{19} y | β^{−}β^{−} | ^{116}Sn |

Cadmium is a chemical element; it has symbol Cd and atomic number 48. This soft, silvery-white metal is chemically similar to the two other stable metals in group 12, zinc and mercury. Like zinc, it demonstrates oxidation state +2 in most of its compounds, and like mercury, it has a lower melting point than the transition metals in groups 3 through 11. Cadmium and its congeners in group 12 are often not considered transition metals, in that they do not have partly filled d or f electron shells in the elemental or common oxidation states. The average concentration of cadmium in Earth's crust is between 0.1 and 0.5 parts per million (ppm). It was discovered in 1817 simultaneously by Stromeyer and Hermann, both in Germany, as an impurity in zinc carbonate.

Cadmium occurs as a minor component in most zinc ores and is a byproduct of zinc production. It was used for a long time in the 1900s as a corrosion-resistant plating on steel, and cadmium compounds are used as red, orange, and yellow pigments, to color glass, and to stabilize plastic. Cadmium's use is generally decreasing because it is toxic, and nickel–cadmium batteries have been replaced with nickel–metal hydride and lithium-ion batteries. Because it is a neutron poison, cadmium is also used as a component of control rods in nuclear fission reactors. One of its few new uses is in cadmium telluride solar panels.

Although cadmium has no known biological function in most organisms, a cadmium-dependent carbonic anhydrase has been found in certain diatoms.

== Characteristics ==
=== Physical properties ===
Cadmium is a soft, malleable, ductile, silvery-white divalent metal. It is similar in many respects to zinc but forms complex compounds. Unlike most other metals, cadmium is resistant to corrosion and is used as a protective plate on other metals. As a bulk metal, cadmium is insoluble in water and is not flammable; however, in its powdered form it may burn and release toxic fumes.

=== Chemical properties ===
Although cadmium usually has an oxidation state of +2, it also exists in the +1 state. Cadmium and its congeners are not always considered transition metals, in that they do not have partly filled d or f electron shells in the elemental or common oxidation states. Cadmium burns in air to form brown amorphous cadmium oxide (CdO); the crystalline form of this compound is a dark red which changes color when heated, similar to zinc oxide. Hydrochloric acid, sulfuric acid, and nitric acid dissolve cadmium by forming cadmium chloride (CdCl_{2}), cadmium sulfate (CdSO_{4}), and cadmium nitrate (Cd(NO_{3})_{2}) respectively. The oxidation state +1 can be produced by dissolving cadmium in a mixture of cadmium chloride and aluminium chloride, forming the Cd^{2+}_{2} cation as cadmium(I) tetrachloroaluminate, which is similar to the Hg^{2+}_{2} cation in mercury(I) chloride.

Cd + CdCl_{2} + 2 AlCl_{3} → Cd_{2}(AlCl_{4})_{2}

The structures of many cadmium complexes with nucleobases, amino acids, and vitamins have been determined.

=== Isotopes ===
Naturally occurring cadmium is composed of eight isotopes. Two of them are radioactive, and three are expected to decay but have not measurably done so under laboratory conditions. The two natural radioactive isotopes are ^{113}Cd (beta decay, half-life is 8.04×10^{15} y) and ^{116}Cd (double beta decay, half-life is 2.69×10^{19} y). The other three are ^{106}Cd, ^{108}Cd (both double electron capture), and ^{114}Cd (double beta decay); only lower limits on these half-lives have been determined. At least three isotopes – ^{110}Cd, ^{111}Cd, and ^{112}Cd – are stable. Among the isotopes that do not occur naturally, the most long-lived are ^{109}Cd with a half-life of 461.3 days, and ^{115}Cd with a half-life of 53.46 hours. All of the remaining radioactive isotopes have half-lives of less than 7 hours, and the majority have half-lives of less than 5 minutes. Cadmium has 8 known meta states, with the most stable being ^{113m}Cd (t_{1/2} = 13.9 years), ^{115m}Cd (t_{1/2} = 44.6 days), and ^{117m}Cd (t_{1/2} = 3.44 hours).

The known isotopes of cadmium range from ^{95}Cd to ^{132}Cd. For isotopes lighter than ^{112}Cd, the primary decay mode is electron capture and the dominant decay product is element 47 (silver). Heavier isotopes decay mostly through beta emission producing element 49 (indium).

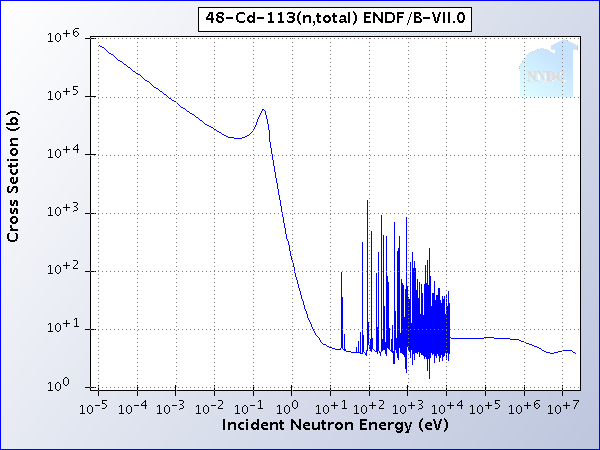
The cadmium-113 total cross section clearly showing the cadmium cut-off

One isotope of cadmium, ^{113}Cd, absorbs neutrons with high selectivity: With very high probability, neutrons with energy below the cadmium cut-off will be absorbed; those higher than the cut-off will be transmitted. The cadmium cut-off is about 0.5 eV, and neutrons below that level are deemed slow neutrons, distinct from intermediate and fast neutrons.

== History ==
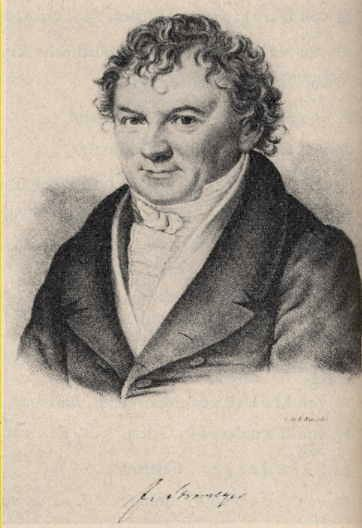
Friedrich Stromeyer

Cadmium (Latin cadmia, Greek καδμεία meaning "calamine", a cadmium-bearing mixture of minerals that was named after the Greek mythological character Κάδμος, Cadmus, the founder of Thebes) was discovered in contaminated zinc compounds sold in pharmacies in Germany in 1817 by Friedrich Stromeyer. Karl Samuel Leberecht Hermann simultaneously investigated the discoloration in zinc oxide and found an impurity, first suspected to be arsenic, because of the yellow precipitate with hydrogen sulfide. Additionally Stromeyer discovered that one supplier sold zinc carbonate instead of zinc oxide. Stromeyer found the new element as an impurity in zinc carbonate (calamine), and, for 100 years, Germany remained the only important producer of the metal. The metal was named after the Latin word for calamine, because it was found in this zinc ore. Stromeyer noted that some impure samples of calamine changed color when heated but pure calamine did not. He was persistent in studying these results and eventually isolated cadmium metal by roasting and reducing the sulfide. The potential for cadmium yellow as pigment was recognized in the 1840s, but the early scarcity of cadmium limited this application.

Even though cadmium and its compounds are toxic in certain forms and concentrations, the British Pharmaceutical Codex from 1907 states that cadmium iodide was used as a medication to treat "enlarged joints, scrofulous glands, and chilblains".

In 1907, the International Astronomical Union defined the international ångström in terms of a red cadmium spectral line (1 wavelength = 6438.46963 Å). This was adopted by the 7th General Conference on Weights and Measures in 1927. In 1960, the definitions of both the metre and ångström were changed to use krypton.

After the industrial scale production of cadmium started in the 1930s and 1940s, the major application of cadmium was the coating of iron and steel to prevent corrosion; in 1944, 62% and in 1956, 59% of the cadmium in the United States was used for plating. In 1956, 24% of the cadmium in the United States was used for a second application in red, orange and yellow pigments from sulfides and selenides of cadmium.

The stabilizing effect of cadmium chemicals like the carboxylates cadmium laurate and cadmium stearate on PVC led to an increased use of those compounds in the 1970s and 1980s. The demand for cadmium in pigments, coatings, stabilizers, and alloys declined as a result of environmental and health regulations in the 1980s and 1990s; in 2006, only 7% of total cadmium consumption was used for plating, and only 10% was used for pigments. At the same time, these decreases in consumption were compensated by a growing demand for cadmium for nickel–cadmium batteries, which accounted for 81% of the cadmium consumption in the United States in 2006.

== Occurrence ==
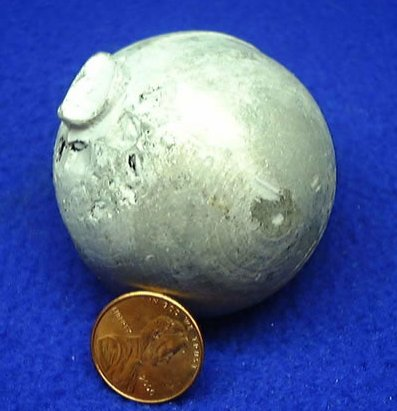
Cadmium metal

Cadmium makes up about 0.1 ppm of Earth's crust and is the 65th most abundant element. It is much rarer than zinc, which makes up about 65 ppm. No significant deposits of cadmium-containing ores are known. The only cadmium mineral of importance, greenockite (CdS), is nearly always associated with sphalerite (ZnS). This association is caused by geochemical similarity between zinc and cadmium, with no geological process likely to separate them. Thus, cadmium is produced mainly as a byproduct of mining, smelting, and refining sulfidic ores of zinc, and, to a lesser degree, lead and copper. Small amounts of cadmium, about 10% of consumption, are produced from secondary sources, mainly from dust generated by recycling iron and steel scrap. Production in the United States began in 1907, but wide use began after World War I.

Metallic cadmium can be found in the Vilyuy River basin in Siberia.

Rocks mined for phosphate fertilizers contain varying amounts of cadmium, resulting in a cadmium concentration of as much as 300 mg/kg in the fertilizers and a high cadmium content in agricultural soils. Coal can contain significant amounts of cadmium, which ends up mostly in coal fly ash.

Cadmium in soil can be absorbed by crops such as rice and cocoa. In 2002, the Chinese ministry of agriculture measured that 28% of rice it sampled had excess lead and 10% had excess cadmium above limits defined by law. Consumer Reports tested 28 brands of dark chocolate sold in the United States in 2022, and found cadmium in all of them, with 13 exceeding the California Maximum Allowable Dose level.

Some plants such as willow trees and poplars have been found to clean both lead and cadmium from soil.

Typical background concentrations of cadmium do not exceed 5 ng/m^{3} in the atmosphere; 2 mg/kg in soil; 1 μg/L in freshwater and 50 ng/L in seawater. Concentrations of cadmium above 10 μg/L may be stable in water having low total solute concentrations and pH and can be difficult to remove by conventional water treatment processes.

== Production ==
Refined cadmium production

Cadmium is a common impurity in zinc ores, and it is most often isolated during the production of zinc. Some zinc ores concentrates from zinc sulfate ores contain up to 1.4% of cadmium. In the 1970s, the output of cadmium was 2.9 kilograms (6.5 lb) per ton of zinc. Zinc sulfide ores are roasted in the presence of oxygen, converting the zinc sulfide to the oxide. Zinc metal is produced either by smelting the oxide with carbon or by electrolysis in sulfuric acid. Cadmium is isolated from the zinc metal by vacuum distillation if the zinc is smelted, or cadmium sulfate is precipitated from the electrolysis solution.

The British Geological Survey reports that in 2001, China was the top producer of cadmium with almost one-sixth of the world's production, closely followed by South Korea and Japan.

History of the world production of cadmium

== Applications ==
Cadmium is a common component of electric batteries, pigments, coatings, and electroplating.

=== Batteries ===
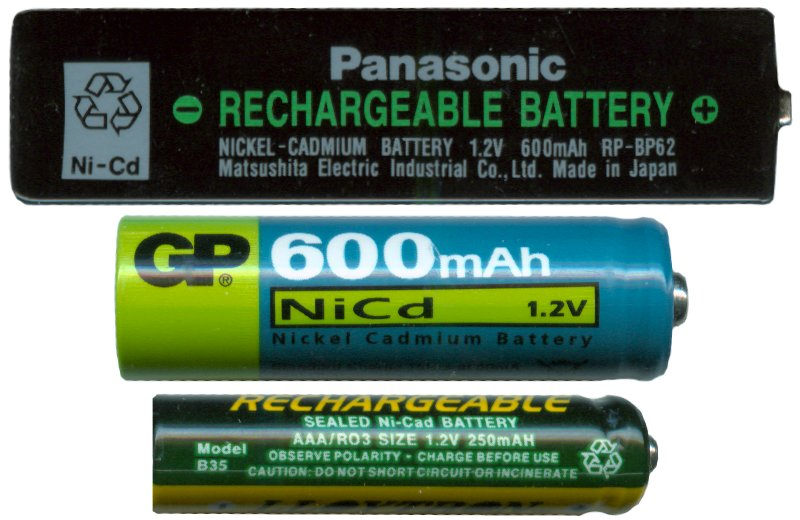
Ni–Cd batteries

In 2009, 86% of cadmium was used in batteries, predominantly in rechargeable nickel–cadmium batteries. Nickel–cadmium cells have a nominal cell potential of 1.2 V. The cell consists of a positive nickel hydroxide electrode and a negative cadmium electrode plate separated by an alkaline electrolyte (potassium hydroxide). The European Union put a limit on cadmium in electronics in 2004 of 0.01%, with some exceptions, and in 2006 limited portable batteries to 0.002% cadmium by weight. The same limit for portable batteries has applied since 18 February 2024 under Regulation (EU) 2023/1542, which replaced the 2006 directive. Another type of battery based on cadmium is the silver–cadmium battery.

=== Electroplating ===
Cadmium electroplating, consuming 6% of the global production, is used in the aircraft industry to reduce corrosion of steel components. This coating is passivated by chromate salts. A limitation of cadmium plating is hydrogen embrittlement of high-strength steels from the electroplating process. Therefore, steel parts heat-treated to tensile strength above 1300 MPa (200 ksi) should be coated by an alternative method (such as special low-embrittlement cadmium electroplating processes or physical vapor deposition).

Titanium embrittlement from cadmium-plated tool residues resulted in banishment of those tools (and the implementation of routine tool testing to detect cadmium contamination) in the A-12/SR-71, U-2, and subsequent aircraft programs that use titanium.

=== Nuclear technology ===
Cadmium is used in the control rods of nuclear reactors, acting as a very effective neutron poison to control neutron flux in nuclear fission. When cadmium rods are inserted in the core of a nuclear reactor, cadmium absorbs neutrons, preventing them from creating additional fission events, thus controlling the amount of reactivity. The pressurized water reactor designed by Westinghouse Electric Company uses an alloy consisting of 80% silver, 15% indium, and 5% cadmium.

=== Televisions ===
QLED TVs have been starting to include cadmium in construction. Some companies have been looking to reduce the environmental impact of human exposure and pollution of the material in televisions during production.

=== Anticancer drugs ===
Complexes based on cadmium and other heavy metals have potential for the treatment of cancer, but their use is often limited due to toxic side effects.

=== Compounds ===
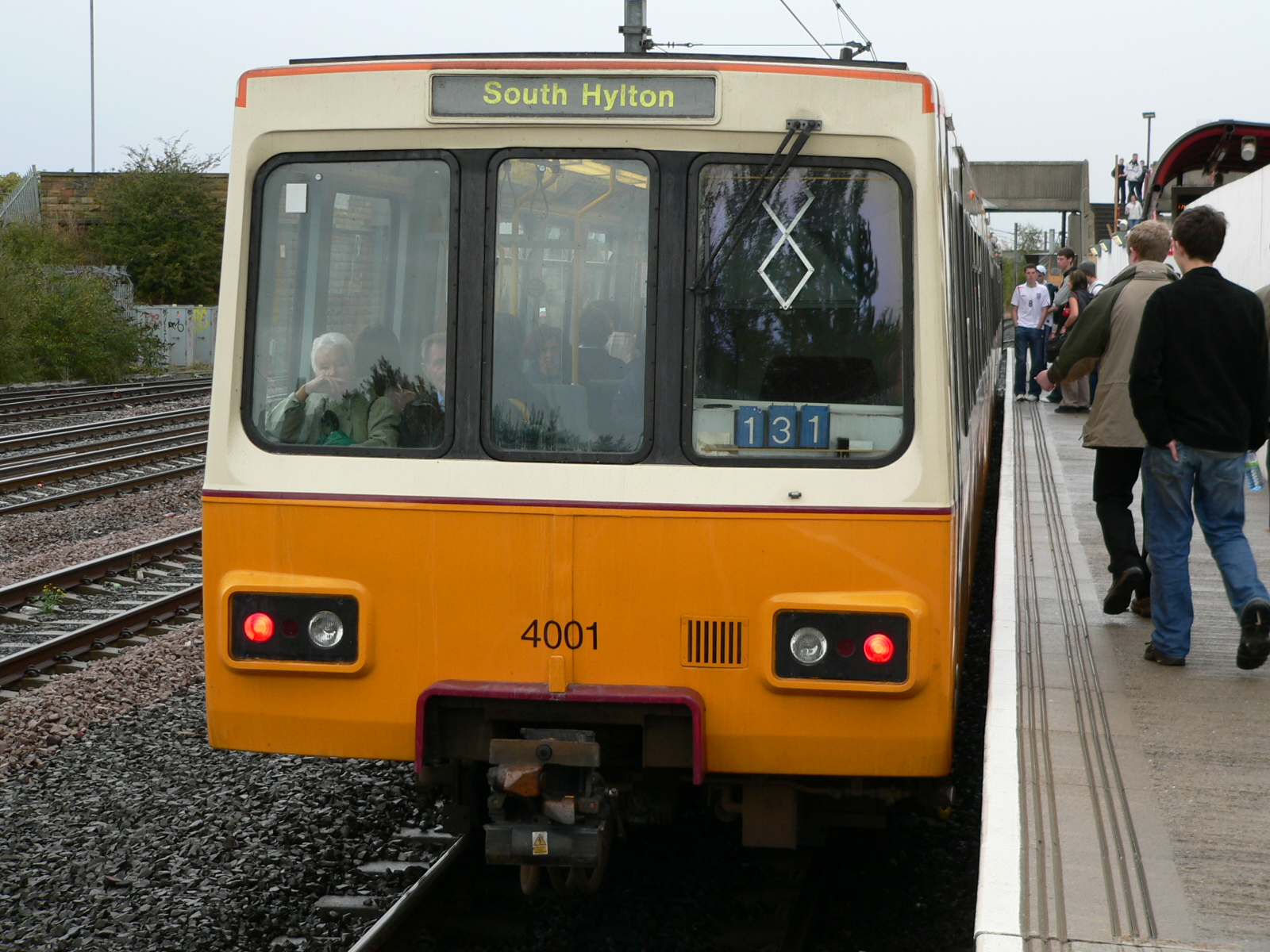
Train painted with cadmium orange

Cadmium oxide was used in black and white television phosphors and in the blue and green phosphors of color television cathode ray tubes. Cadmium sulfide (CdS) is used as a photoconductive surface coating for photocopier drums.

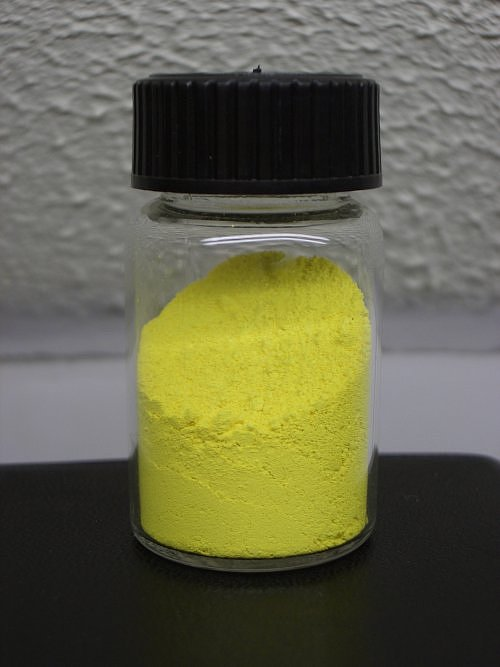
Cadmium sulfide

Various cadmium salts are used in paint pigments, with CdS as a yellow pigment being the most common. Cadmium selenide is a red pigment, commonly called cadmium red. To painters who work with the pigment, cadmium provides the most brilliant and durable yellows, oranges, and reds – so much so that during production, these colors are significantly toned down before they are ground with oils and binders or blended into watercolors, gouaches, acrylics, and other paint and pigment formulations. Because these pigments are potentially toxic, for safety users normally use a barrier cream on the hands to prevent absorption through the skin even though the amount of cadmium absorbed into the body through the skin is reported to be less than 1%.

In PVC, cadmium was used as heat, light, and weathering stabilizers. Currently, cadmium stabilizers have been completely replaced with barium-zinc, calcium-zinc and organo-tin stabilizers. Cadmium is used in many kinds of solder and bearing alloys, because it has a low coefficient of friction and fatigue resistance. It is also found in some of the lowest-melting alloys, such as Wood's metal.

=== Semiconductors ===
Cadmium is an element in some semiconductor materials. Cadmium sulfide, cadmium selenide, and cadmium telluride are used in some photodetectors and solar cells. HgCdTe detectors are sensitive to mid-infrared light and used in some motion detectors.

=== Laboratory uses ===
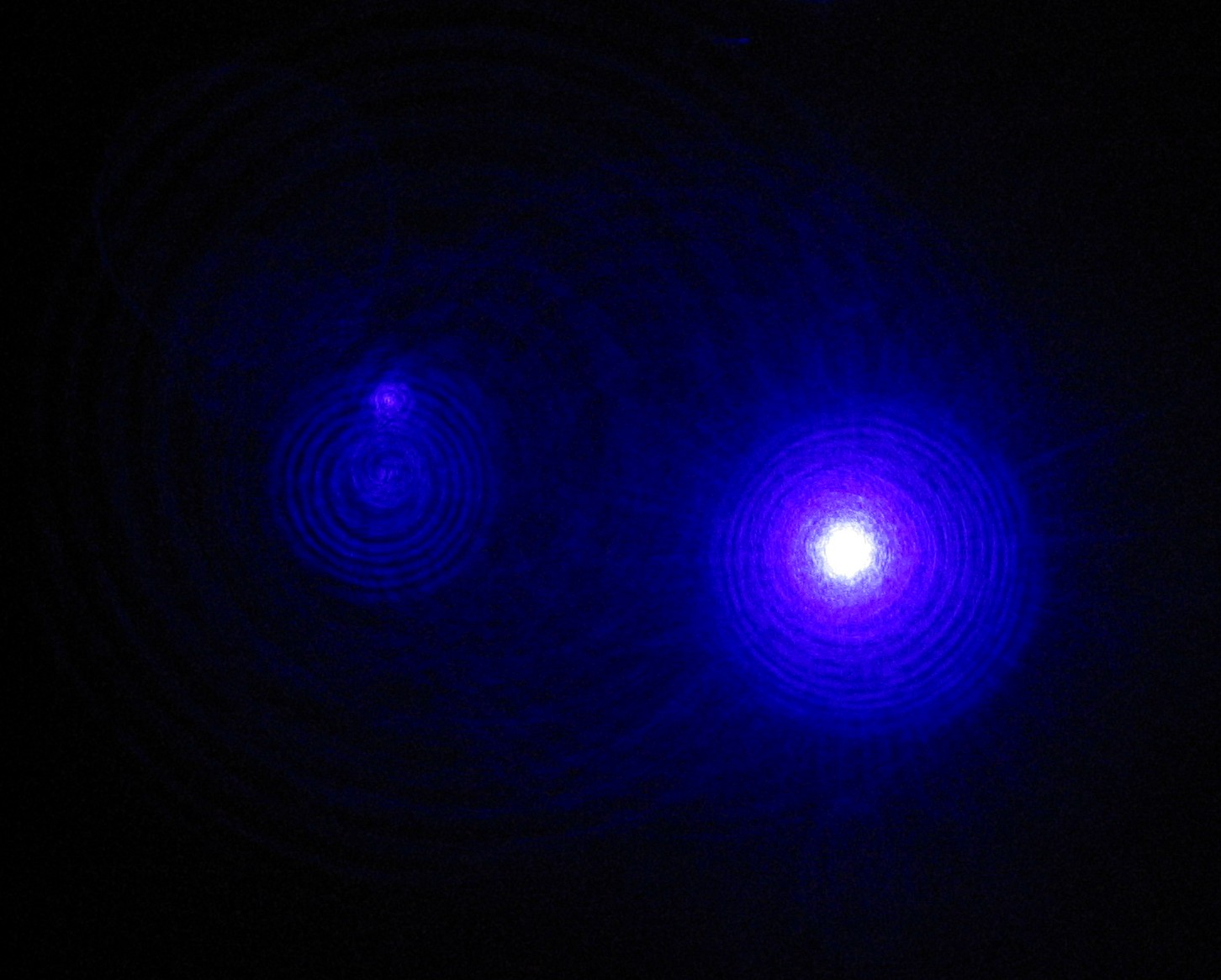
Violet light from a helium cadmium metal vapor laser. The highly monochromatic color arises from the 441.563 nm transition line of cadmium.

Helium–cadmium lasers are a common source of blue or ultraviolet laser light. Lasers at wavelengths of 325, 354 and 442 nm are made using this gain medium; some models can switch between these wavelengths. They are notably used in fluorescence microscopy as well as various laboratory uses requiring laser light at these wavelengths.

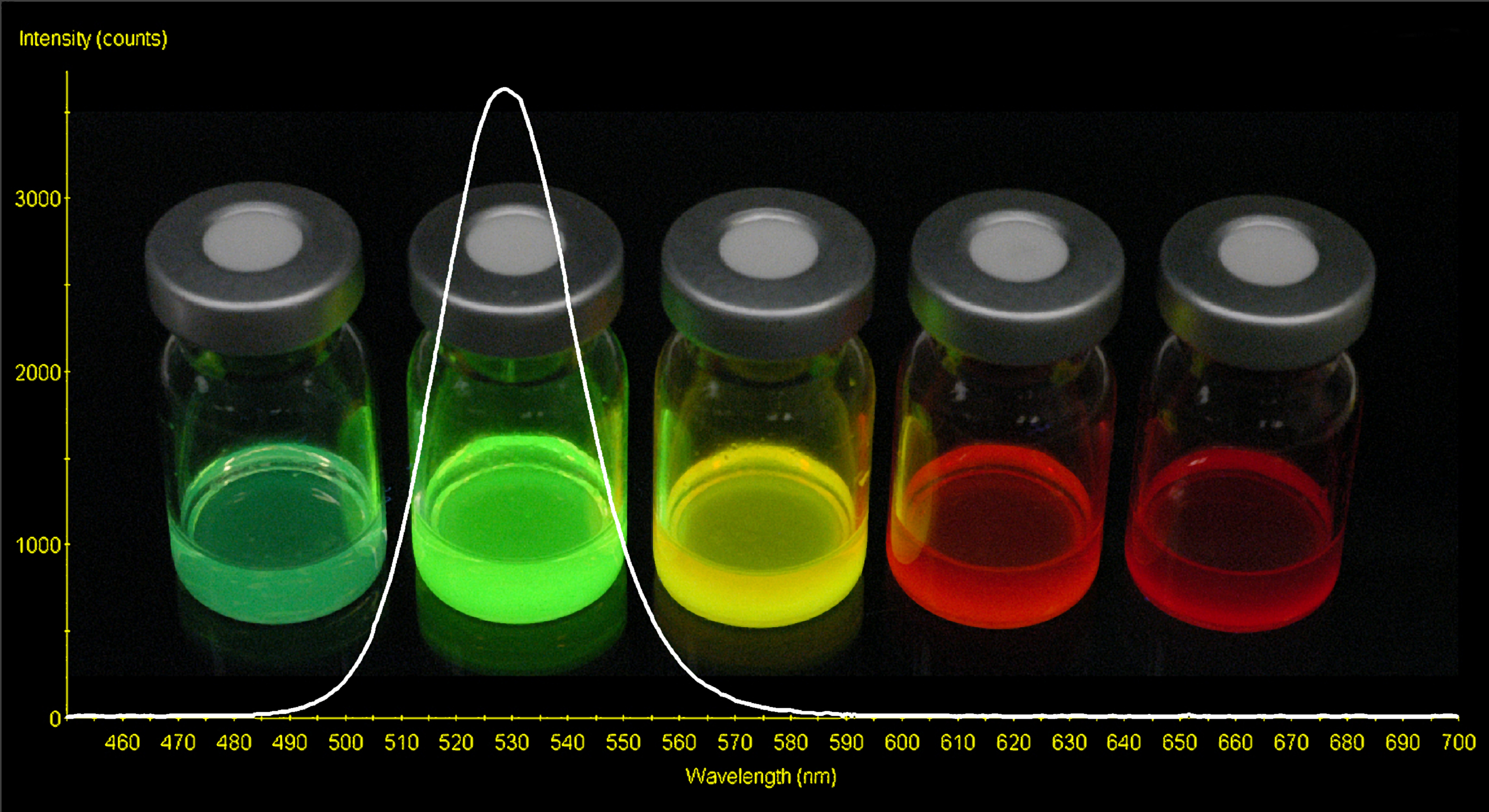
A photograph and representative spectrum of photoluminescence from colloidal CdSe quantum dots

Cadmium selenide quantum dots emit bright luminescence under UV excitation (He–Cd laser, for example). The color of this luminescence can be green, yellow or red depending on the particle size. Colloidal solutions of those particles are used for imaging of biological tissues and solutions with a fluorescence microscope.

In molecular biology, cadmium is used to block voltage-dependent calcium channels from fluxing calcium ions, as well as in hypoxia research to stimulate proteasome-dependent degradation of Hif-1α.

Cadmium-selective sensors based on the fluorophore BODIPY have been developed for imaging and sensing of cadmium in cells. One powerful method for monitoring cadmium in aqueous environments involves electrochemistry. By employing a self-assembled monolayer one can obtain a cadmium selective electrode with a ppt-level sensitivity.

=== Jewelry ===
In August 2025, within the course of a joint project with the European Commission monitoring online marketplaces such as Temu, AliExpress and Shein, the Latvian Consumer Rights Protection Centre, while testing a selection of best-selling jewelry goods, discovered extreme quantities of cadmium in 60% of the tested products. Some of the items were found to consist mostly of cadmium, at a purity of 80% or higher, in one case — a ring from AliExpress shaped like a snake — an impressive 92% cadmium alloy, evidencing that there is at least one jewelry manufacturer that has been using cadmium at some point as the primary material for its products and may still be doing so.

== Biological role ==
Cadmium has no known function in most organisms, and is toxic. Cadmium is considered an environmental pollutant hazardous to living organisms. A cadmium-dependent carbonic anhydrase has been found in some marine diatoms, which live in environments with low zinc concentrations.

Exposure to cadmium leads to raised levels in the blood cells for a number of months. In vertebrates cadmium is preferentially absorbed in the kidneys but also in the liver and bones. Up to about 30 mg of cadmium is commonly inhaled throughout human childhood and adolescence. Cadmium is eliminated from the body in very small amounts and mainly through urine resulting in a biological half-life of 20 to 40 years.

Cadmium is under research for its potential toxicity to increase the risk of cancer, cardiovascular disease, and osteoporosis.

=== Environmental impact ===
The biogeochemistry of cadmium and its release to the environment is under research. However, cadmium has been found in the blubber of whales with levels increasing with age. This poses a potential risk to peoples who consume and rely on whale meat.

== Safety ==
Cadmium
Hazards
- GHS labelling
| Pictograms | (GHS06: Toxic) (GHS08: Health hazard) (GHS09: Environmental hazard) |
| Signal word | Danger |
| Hazard statements | H301, H330, H341, H350, H361fd, H372, H410 |
| Precautionary statements | P201, P202, P260, P264, P273, P304+P340+P310 |
| NFPA 704 (fire diamond) | 4 0 0 |

Individuals and organizations have been reviewing cadmium's bioinorganic aspects for its toxicity. The most dangerous form of occupational exposure to cadmium is inhalation of fine dust and fumes, or ingestion of highly soluble cadmium compounds. Inhalation of cadmium fumes can result initially in metal fume fever, but may progress to chemical pneumonitis, pulmonary edema, necrosis and death.

Cadmium is also an environmental hazard. Human exposure is primarily from fossil fuel combustion, phosphate fertilizers, natural sources, iron and steel production, cement production and related activities, nonferrous metals production, and municipal solid waste incineration. Other sources of cadmium include bread, root crops, and vegetables.

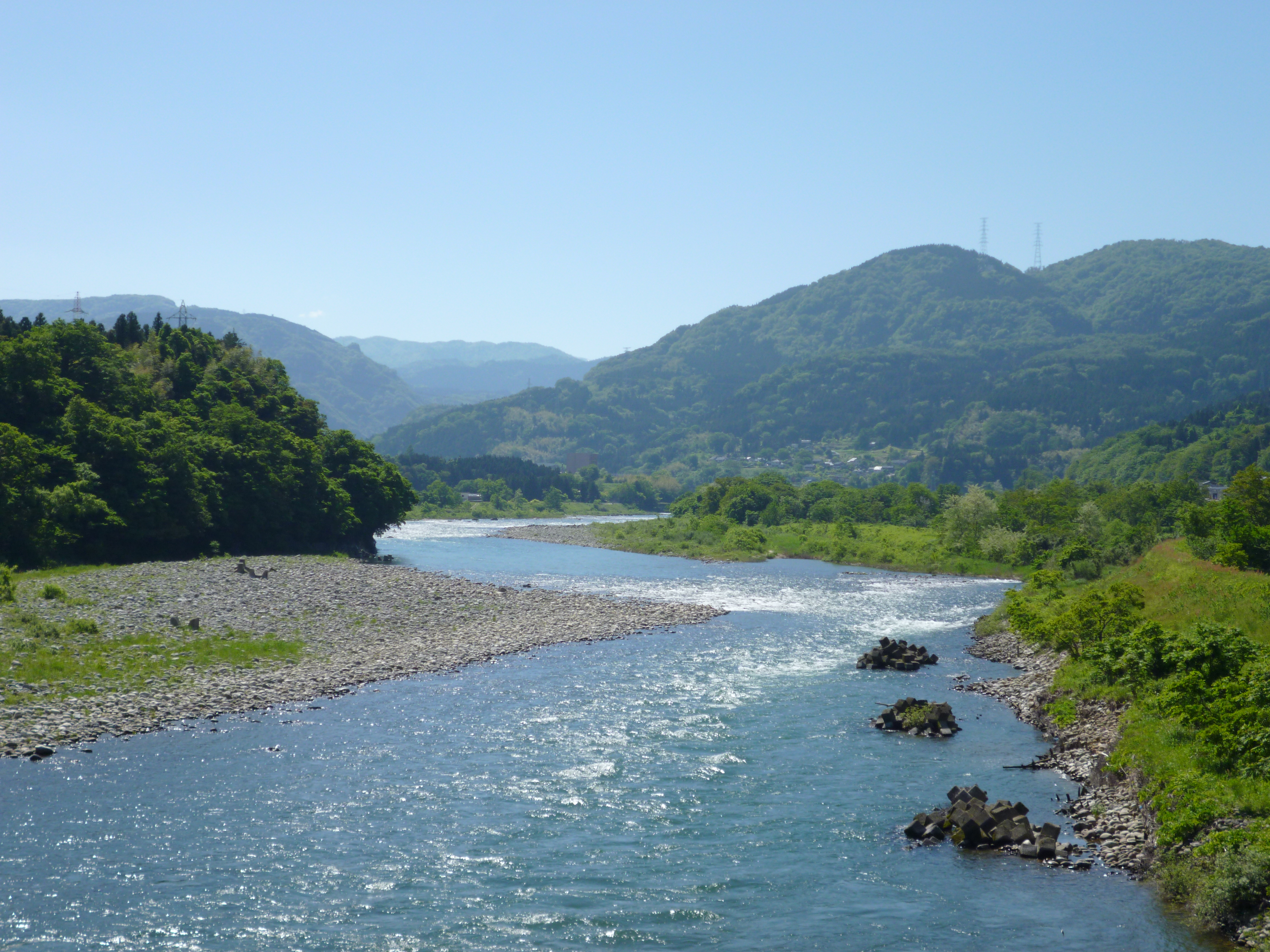
Jinzū River area, which was contaminated with cadmium

There have been a few instances of general population poisoning as the result of long-term exposure to cadmium in contaminated food and water. Research into an estrogen mimicry that may induce breast cancer is ongoing, as of 2012. In the decades leading up to World War II, mining operations contaminated the Jinzū River in Japan with cadmium and traces of other toxic metals. As a consequence, cadmium accumulated in the rice crops along the riverbanks downstream of the mines. Some members of the local agricultural communities consumed the contaminated rice and developed itai-itai disease and renal abnormalities, including proteinuria and glucosuria. The victims of this poisoning were almost exclusively post-menopausal women with low iron and low body stores of other minerals. Similar general population cadmium exposures in other parts of the world have not resulted in the same health problems because the populations maintained sufficient iron and other mineral levels. Thus, although cadmium is a major factor in the itai-itai disease in Japan, most researchers have concluded that it was one of several factors.

Cadmium is one of ten substances banned by the European Union's Restriction of Hazardous Substances (RoHS) directive, which regulates hazardous substances in electrical and electronic equipment, but allows for certain exemptions and exclusions from the scope of the law.

The International Agency for Research on Cancer has classified cadmium and cadmium compounds as carcinogenic to humans. Although occupational exposure to cadmium is linked to lung and prostate cancer, there is still uncertainty about the carcinogenicity of cadmium in low environmental exposure. Recent data from epidemiological studies suggest that intake of cadmium through diet is associated with a higher risk of endometrial, breast, and prostate cancer as well as with osteoporosis in humans. A recent study has demonstrated that endometrial tissue is characterized by higher levels of cadmium in current and former smoking females.

Cadmium exposure is associated with a large number of illnesses including kidney disease, early atherosclerosis, hypertension, and cardiovascular diseases. Although studies show a significant correlation between cadmium exposure and occurrence of disease in human populations, a molecular mechanism has not yet been identified. One hypothesis holds that cadmium is an endocrine disruptor and some experimental studies have shown that it can interact with different hormonal signaling pathways. For example, cadmium can bind to the estrogen receptor alpha, and affect signal transduction along the estrogen and MAPK signaling pathways at low doses.

The tobacco plant absorbs and accumulates heavy metals such as cadmium from the surrounding soil into its leaves. Following tobacco smoke inhalation, these are readily absorbed into the body of users. Tobacco smoking is the most important single source of cadmium exposure in the general population. An estimated 10% of the cadmium content of a cigarette is inhaled through smoking. Absorption of cadmium through the lungs is more effective than through the gut. As much as 50% of the cadmium inhaled in cigarette smoke may be absorbed. On average, cadmium concentrations in the blood of smokers is 4 to 5 times greater than non-smokers and in the kidney, 2–3 times greater than in non-smokers. Despite the high cadmium content in cigarette smoke, there seems to be little exposure to cadmium from passive smoking.

In a non-smoking population, food accounts for around 90% of cadmium uptake. High quantities of cadmium can be found in crustaceans, mollusks, offal, frog legs, cocoa powder, bitter and semi-bitter chocolate, seaweed, fungi and algae products. However, grains, vegetables, and starchy roots and tubers are consumed in much greater quantity in the U.S., and are the source of the greatest dietary exposure there.

Most plants bio-accumulate metal toxins such as cadmium and when composted to form organic fertilizers, yield a product that often can contain high amounts (e.g., over 0.5 mg) of metal toxins for every kilogram of fertilizer. Fertilizers made from animal dung (e.g., cow dung) or urban waste can contain similar amounts of cadmium. The cadmium added to the soil from fertilizers (rock phosphates or organic fertilizers) become bio-available and toxic only if the soil pH is low (i.e., acidic soils). In the European Union, an analysis of almost 22,000 topsoil samples with LUCAS survey concluded that 5.5% of samples have concentrations higher than 1 mg kg^{−1}.

Zinc, copper, calcium, and iron ions, and selenium with vitamin C are used to treat cadmium intoxication, although it is not easily reversed.

=== Regulations ===
Because of the adverse effects of cadmium on the environment and human health, the supply and use of cadmium is restricted in Europe under the REACH Regulation.

The EFSA Panel on Contaminants in the Food Chain specifies that 2.5 μg/kg body weight is a tolerable weekly intake for humans. The Joint FAO/WHO Expert Committee on Food Additives has declared 7 μg/kg body weight to be the provisional tolerable weekly intake level. The state of California requires a food label to carry a warning about potential exposure to cadmium on products such as cocoa powder. The European Commission has put in place the EU regulation (2019/1009) on fertilizing products (EU, 2019), adopted in June 2019 and fully applicable as of July 2022. It sets a Cd limit value in phosphate fertilizers to 60 mg kg^{−1} of P_{2}O_{5}.

The U.S. Occupational Safety and Health Administration (OSHA) has set the permissible exposure limit (PEL) for cadmium at a time-weighted average (TWA) of 0.005 ppm. The National Institute for Occupational Safety and Health (NIOSH) has not set a recommended exposure limit (REL) and has designated cadmium as a known human carcinogen. The IDLH (immediately dangerous to life and health) level for cadmium is 9 mg/m^{3}.

| Lethal dose | Organism | Route | Time |
|---|---|---|---|
| LD_{50}: 225 mg/kg | rat | oral | n/a |
| LD_{50}: 890 mg/kg | mouse | oral | n/a |
| LC_{50}: 25 mg/m^{3} | rat | airborne | 30 min |

In addition to mercury, the presence of cadmium in some batteries has led to the requirement of proper disposal (or recycling) of batteries.

=== Product recalls ===
In May 2006, a sale of the seats from Arsenal F.C.'s old stadium, Highbury in London, England was cancelled when the seats were discovered to contain trace amounts of cadmium. Reports of high levels of cadmium use in children's jewelry in 2010 led to a US Consumer Product Safety Commission investigation. The U.S. CPSC issued specific recall notices for cadmium content in jewelry sold by Claire's and Wal-Mart stores.

In June 2010, McDonald's voluntarily recalled more than 12 million promotional Shrek Forever After 3D Collectible Drinking Glasses because of the cadmium levels in paint pigments on the glassware. The glasses were manufactured by Arc International, of Millville, New Jersey, USA.

== See also ==
- Red List building materials
- Toxic heavy metal
