= Karl Samuel Leberecht Hermann =

German chemist (1765-1846)

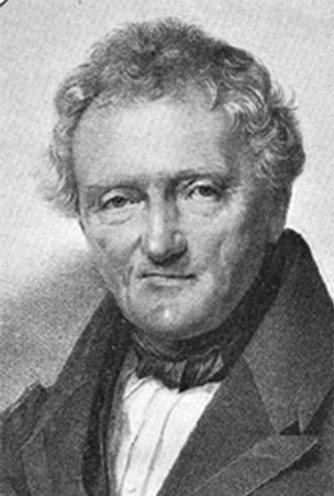
- Born: 20 January 1765; Königerode, Prussia
- Died: 1 September 1846 (aged 81); Schönebeck, Prussia

Karl Samuel Leberecht Hermann (20 January 1765 – 1 September 1846) was a German chemist who helped discover cadmium in 1817.

Cadmium was discovered in 1817 by a physician, Friedrich Stromeyer (1776–1835). The element was first found in the condensation of vapors (mixed with soot and zinc oxide) that rose out of a furnace in which zinc oxide was being roasted. Cadmium’s discovery is also loosely attributed to K.S.L. Hermann and J.C.H. Roloff who may have found cadmium in zinc oxide during the same year. A historical debate still remains as to who actually discovered the pure form of the element first. The phase of scientific history in which Stromeyer was active was one in which chemical discovery was being accomplished primarily by pharmacists, apothecaries and physicians. The practice of alchemy was dying out, and chemistry was just beginning to emerge as a separate science. Stromeyer, a professor at the University of Göttingen, was testing zinc oxide, a medicine in those days, for purity.

The name of the element was derived from the Latin “cadmia” and the Greek “kadmeia,” both ancient names for calamine (zinc carbonate).
