= Group 11 element =

Group of elements in the periodic table

Group 11 in the periodic table
Hydrogen																															Helium
Lithium	Beryllium																									Boron	Carbon	Nitrogen	Oxygen	Fluorine	Neon
Sodium	Magnesium																									Aluminium	Silicon	Phosphorus	Sulfur	Chlorine	Argon
Potassium	Calcium															Scandium	Titanium	Vanadium	Chromium	Manganese	Iron	Cobalt	Nickel	Copper	Zinc	Gallium	Germanium	Arsenic	Selenium	Bromine	Krypton
Rubidium	Strontium															Yttrium	Zirconium	Niobium	Molybdenum	Technetium	Ruthenium	Rhodium	Palladium	Silver	Cadmium	Indium	Tin	Antimony	Tellurium	Iodine	Xenon
Caesium	Barium	Lanthanum	Cerium	Praseodymium	Neodymium	Promethium	Samarium	Europium	Gadolinium	Terbium	Dysprosium	Holmium	Erbium	Thulium	Ytterbium	Lutetium	Hafnium	Tantalum	Tungsten	Rhenium	Osmium	Iridium	Platinum	Gold	Mercury (element)	Thallium	Lead	Bismuth	Polonium	Astatine	Radon
Francium	Radium	Actinium	Thorium	Protactinium	Uranium	Neptunium	Plutonium	Americium	Curium	Berkelium	Californium	Einsteinium	Fermium	Mendelevium	Nobelium	Lawrencium	Rutherfordium	Dubnium	Seaborgium	Bohrium	Hassium	Meitnerium	Darmstadtium	Roentgenium	Copernicium	Nihonium	Flerovium	Moscovium	Livermorium	Tennessine	Oganesson
group 10 ← → group 12
IUPAC group number	11
Name by element	copper group
Trivial name	coinage metals
CAS group number (US, pattern A-B-A)	IB
old IUPAC number (Europe, pattern A-B)	IB

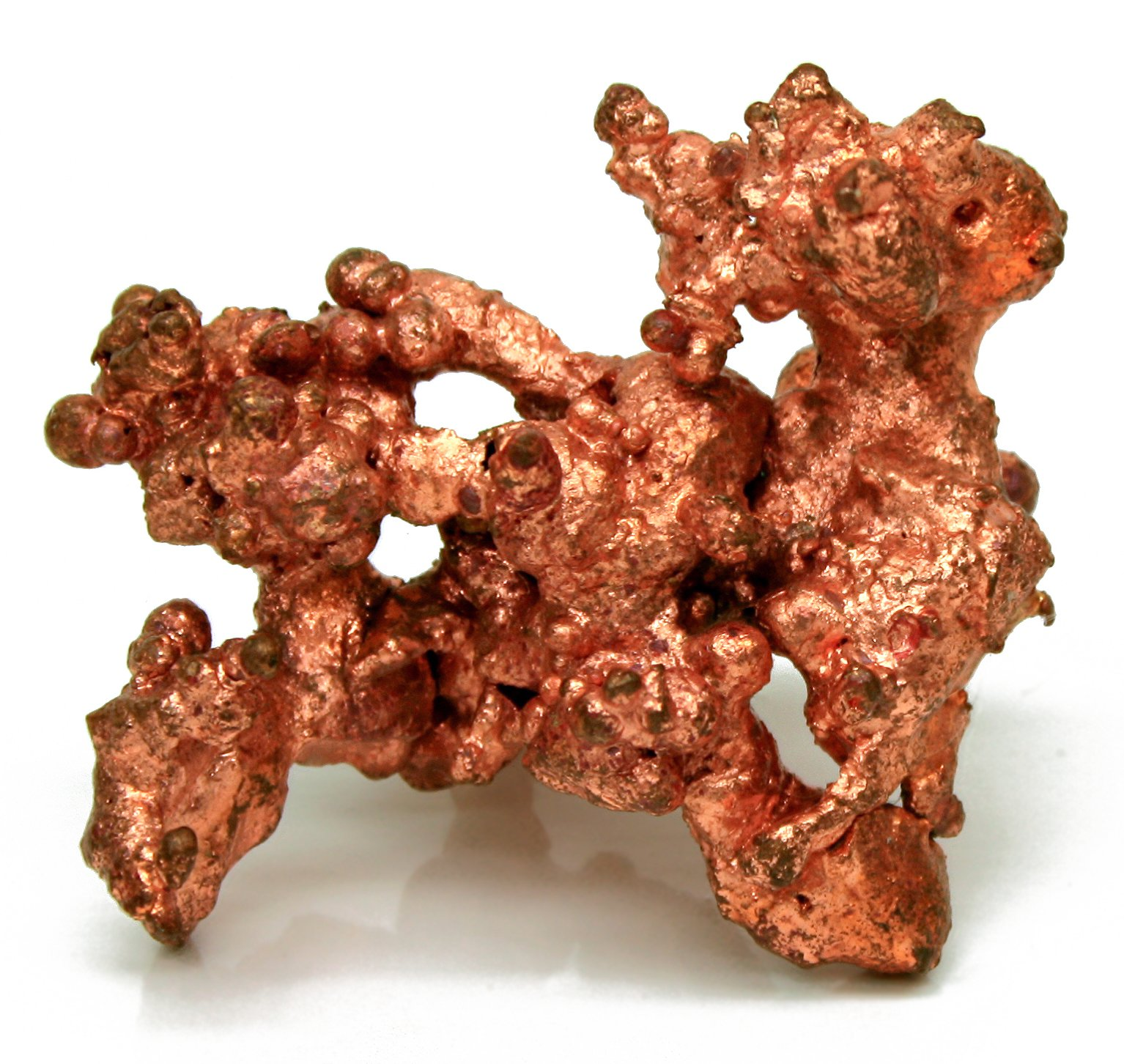
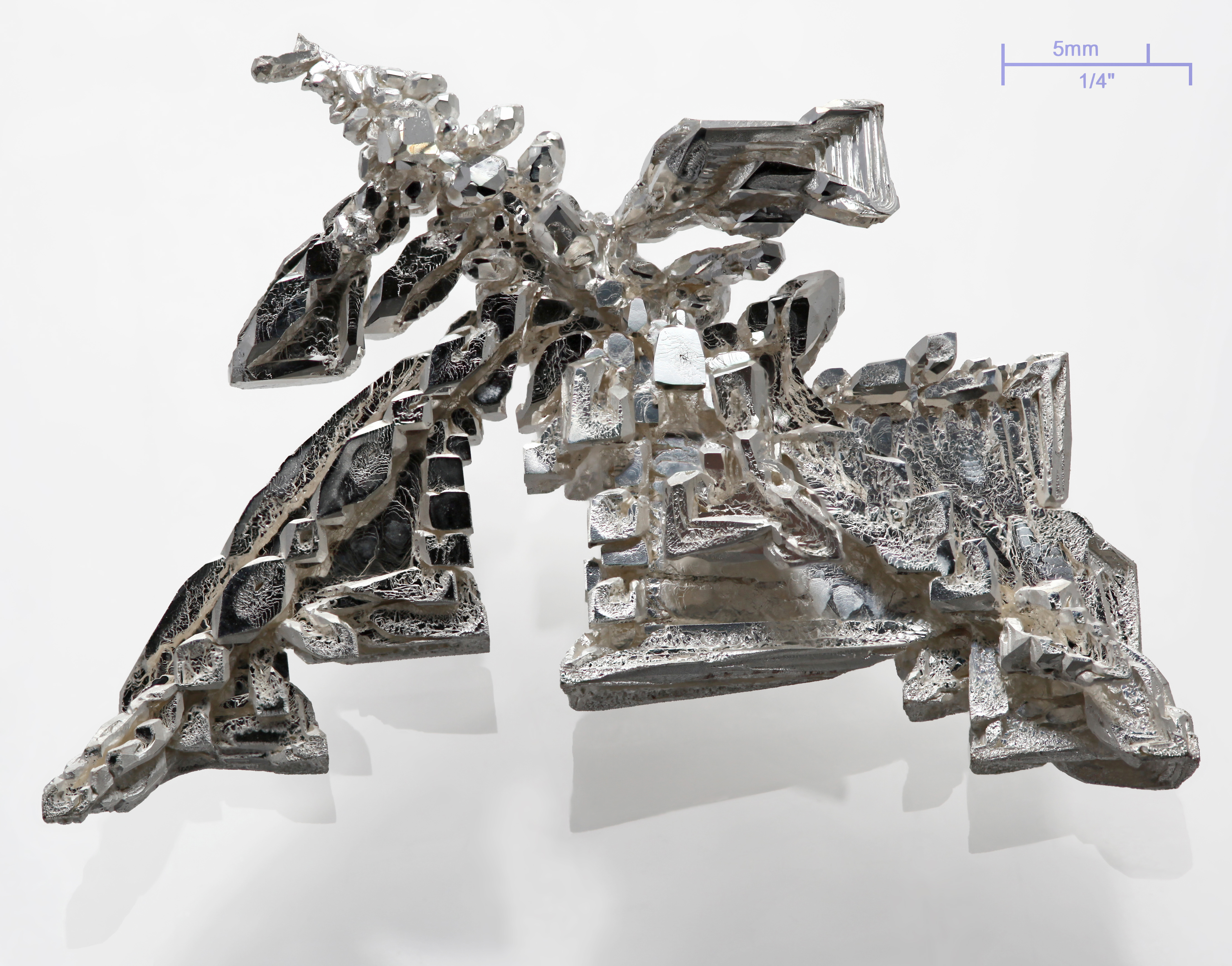
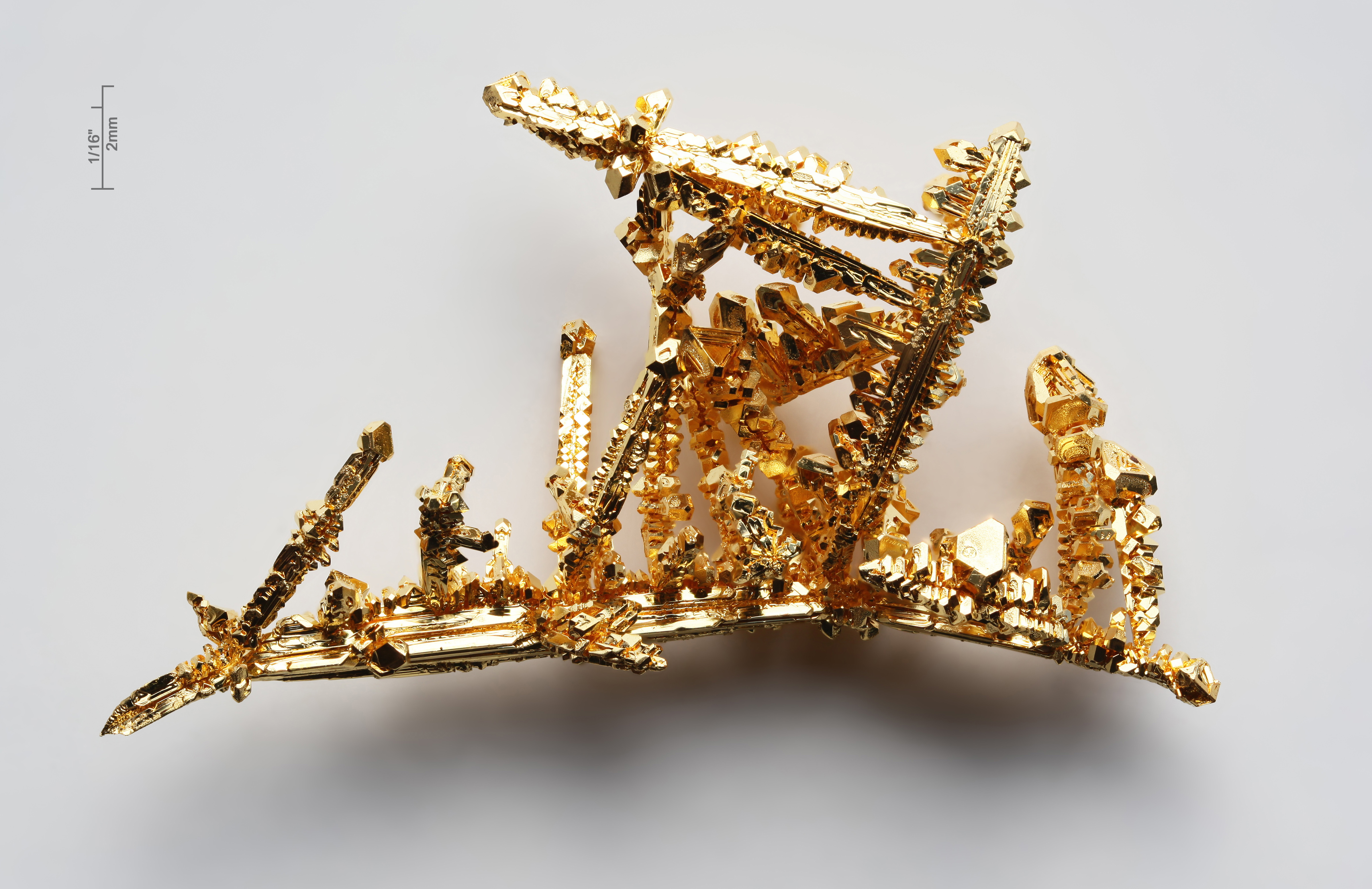
↓ Period
4	Copper (Cu); 29 Transition metal
5	Silver (Ag); 47 Transition metal
6	Gold (Au); 79 Transition metal
7	Roentgenium (Rg); 111 unknown chemical properties
Legend primordial element synthetic element

Group 11, by modern IUPAC numbering, is a group of chemical elements in the periodic table, consisting of copper (Cu), silver (Ag), gold (Au), and roentgenium (Rg), although no chemical experiments have yet been carried out to confirm that roentgenium behaves like the heavier homologue to gold. Group 11, more specifically the first three members, are also known as the coinage metals, due to their usage in minting coins—while the rise in metal prices means that silver and gold are no longer used for circulating currency, remaining in use for bullion, copper remains a common metal in coins to date, either in the form of copper clad coinage or as part of the cupronickel alloy. They were most likely the first three elements discovered. Copper, silver, and gold all occur naturally in elemental form.

== History ==
All three stable elements of the group have been known since prehistoric times, as all of them occur in metallic form in nature and no extraction metallurgy is necessary to produce them.

Copper was known and used around 4000 BC and many items, weapons and materials were made and used with copper.

The first evidence of silver mining dates back to 3000 BC, in Turkey and Greece, according to the RSC. Ancient people even figured out how to refine silver.

The earliest recorded metal employed by humans appears to be gold, which can be found free or "native". Small amounts of natural gold have been found in Spanish caves used during the late Paleolithic period, c. 40,000 BC. Gold artifacts made their first appearance at the very beginning of the pre-dynastic period in Egypt, at the end of the fifth millennium BC and the start of the fourth, and smelting was developed during the course of the 4th millennium BC; gold artifacts appear in the archeology of Lower Mesopotamia during the early 4th millennium BC.

Roentgenium was made in 1994 by bombarding nickel-64 atoms into bismuth-209 to make roentgenium-272.

== Characteristics ==
Like other groups, the members of this family show patterns in electron configuration, especially in the outermost shells, resulting in trends in chemical behavior, although roentgenium is probably an exception:

Z	Element	Electrons per shell
29	copper	2, 8, 18, 1
47	silver	2, 8, 18, 18, 1
79	gold	2, 8, 18, 32, 18, 1
111	roentgenium	2, 8, 18, 32, 32, 17, 2 (predicted)

All group 11 elements are relatively inert, corrosion-resistant metals. Copper and gold are colored, but silver is not. Roentgenium is expected to be silvery, though it has not been produced in large enough amounts to confirm this.

These elements have low electrical resistivity so they are used for wiring. Copper is the cheapest and most widely used. Bond wires for integrated circuits are usually gold. Silver and silver-plated copper wiring are found in some special applications.

== Occurrence ==
Copper occurs in its native form in Chile, China, Mexico, Russia and the USA. Various natural ores of copper are: copper pyrites (CuFeS_{2}), cuprite or ruby copper (Cu_{2}O), copper glance (Cu_{2}S), malachite (Cu(OH)_{2}CuCO_{3}), and azurite (Cu(OH)_{2}2CuCO_{3}).

Copper pyrite is the principal ore, and yields nearly 76% of the world production of copper.

== Production ==
Silver is found in native form, as an alloy with gold (electrum), and in ores containing sulfur, arsenic, antimony or chlorine. Ores include argentite (Ag_{2}S), chlorargyrite (AgCl) which includes horn silver, and pyrargyrite (Ag_{3}SbS_{3}). Silver is extracted using the Parkes process.

== Applications ==
These metals, especially silver, have unusual properties that make them essential for industrial applications outside of their monetary or decorative value. They are all excellent conductors of electricity. The most conductive (by volume) of all metals are silver, copper and gold in that order. Silver is also the most thermally conductive element, and the most light-reflecting element. Silver also has the unusual property that the tarnish that forms on silver is still highly electrically conductive.

Copper is used extensively in electrical wiring and circuitry. Gold contacts are sometimes found in precision equipment for their ability to remain corrosion-free. Silver is used widely in mission-critical applications as electrical contacts and is also used in photography (because silver nitrate reverts to metal on exposure to light), agriculture, medicine, sound reproduction and scientific applications.

Gold, silver, and copper are quite soft metals and so are easily damaged in daily use as coins. Precious metal may also be easily abraded and worn away through use. In their numismatic functions these metals must be alloyed with other metals to afford coins greater durability. The alloying with other metals makes the resulting coins harder, less likely to become deformed and more resistant to wear.

Gold coins: Gold coins are typically produced as either 90% gold (e.g. with pre-1933 US coins), or 22 carat (91.66%) gold (e.g. current collectible coins and Krugerrands), with copper and silver making up the remaining weight in each case. Bullion gold coins are being produced with up to 99.999% gold (in the Canadian Gold Maple Leaf series).

Silver coins: Silver coins are typically produced as either 90% silver – in the case of pre-1965 US minted coins (which were circulated in many countries), or sterling silver (92.5%) coins for pre-1920 British Commonwealth and other silver coinage, with copper making up the remaining weight in each case. Old European coins were commonly produced with 83.5% silver. Modern silver bullion coins are often produced with purity varying from 99.9% to 99.999%.

Copper coins: Copper coins are often of quite high purity, around 97%, and are usually alloyed with small amounts of zinc and tin.

Inflation has caused the face value of coins to fall below the hard currency value of the historically used metals. This had led to most modern coins being made of base metals – copper nickel (around 80:20, silver in color) is popular as are nickel-brass (copper (75), nickel (5) and zinc (20), gold in color), manganese-brass (copper, zinc, manganese, and nickel), bronze, or simple plated steel.

== Biological role and toxicity ==
Copper, although toxic in excessive amounts, is essential for life. It can be found in hemocyanin, cytochrome c oxidase and in superoxide dismutase. Copper is shown to have antimicrobial properties which make it useful for hospital doorknobs to keep diseases from being spread. Eating food in copper containers is known to increase the risk of copper toxicity. Wilson's disease is a genetic condition in which a protein important for excretion of excess copper is mutated such that copper builds up in body tissues, causing symptoms including vomiting, weakness, tremors, anxiety, and muscle stiffness.

Elemental gold and silver have no known toxic effects or biological use, although gold salts can be toxic to liver and kidney tissue. Like copper, silver also has antimicrobial properties. The prolonged use of preparations containing gold or silver can also lead to the accumulation of these metals in body tissue; the results of which are irreversible but apparently harmless pigmentation conditions known as chrysiasis and argyria respectively.

Due to being short lived and radioactive, roentgenium has no biological use but it is likely extremely harmful due to its radioactivity.
