= Corderoite =

Extremely rare mercury sulfide chloride mineral

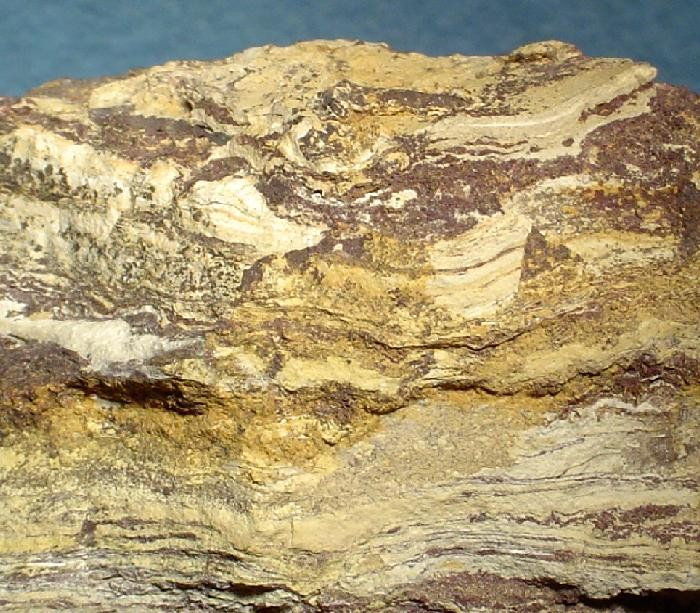
- Dark red bands of cinnabar alternate with layers of tan limonite. The corderoite are the yellow-tan microcrystals.

General
- Category: Halide mineral
- Formula: Hg_{3}S_{2}Cl_{2}
- IMA symbol: Cde
- Strunz classification: 2.FC.15a
- Crystal system: Cubic
- Crystal class: Tetartoidal (23) (same H-M symbol)
- Space group: I2_{1}3
- Unit cell: a = 8.940(5) Å; Z = 4

Identification
- Color: Pale orange-pink to salmon-pink; on exposure to light, rapidly darkening to pale gray, then black
- Crystal habit: Rare as cubic crystals; as rims and replacements of cinnabar
- Mohs scale hardness: 3
- Diaphaneity: Transparent
- Specific gravity: 6.845 calc.
- Optical properties: Isotropic
- Refractive index: n > 2.5

Corderoite is an extremely rare mercury sulfide chloride mineral with formula Hg_{3}S_{2}Cl_{2}. It crystallizes in the isometric crystal system. It is soft, 1.5 to 2 on the Mohs scale, and varies in color from light gray to black and rarely pink or yellow.

It was first described in 1974 for occurrences in the McDermitt Mercury mine in Humboldt County, Nevada. The name is from the old name of the mine, the Old Cordero Mine.

== Structure ==
The structure of Hg_{3}S_{2}Cl_{2} was determined in the 1960s before it was found in nature. It has crankshaft chains that are crosswise linked by additional Hg²+. The crystals are chiral (existing in two enantiomorphic forms), in space group I2_{1}3 (no. 199). The chloride ions form a lattice similar to a primitive cubic lattice (but with the ions slightly displaced along three-fold axes), and the sulfide ions form a similar lattice by occupying positions near the centres of the cubes of chloride ions, also on three-fold rotation axes. This gives eight chloride and eight sulfide ions per unit cell. The mercury ions are located on two-fold rotation axes that do not intersect the three-fold rotation axes. They occupy positions close to the centres of the faces of the chloride cubes, but only half of such positions are occupied, giving 12 mercury ions per unit cell. The closest neighbors of a mercury ion are two sulfide ions, at a distance of 2.422 Å, the S-Hg-S angle being 165.1°. Each sulfide ion has three mercury ions near it, with the Hg-S-Hg angles being 94.1°. The nearest neighbors of a chloride ion are six mercury ions, at two somewhat different distances. A diagram can be seen on line, with blue balls representing mercury, green chlorine, and yellow sulfur. Various sulfide halides of Hg share the feature of being face-sharing [HgS_{2}X_{4}]^{−6} polyhedral, with X=Cl in the case of corderoite.

== Geologic occurrence ==
The main occurrence of corderoite in the type locality is in the Upper Miocene playa sediments within a thick zone, around 5–7 m (16–23 ft), sub parallel to bedding. Lake sediments including altered rhyolitic tuff and ash were deposited on the Tertiary rhyolitic volcanic rocks. Corderoite occurs as isolated grains or with cinnabar as replacements. Corderoite occurs as a low temperature supergene mineral.
