= Chromium(II) sulfide =

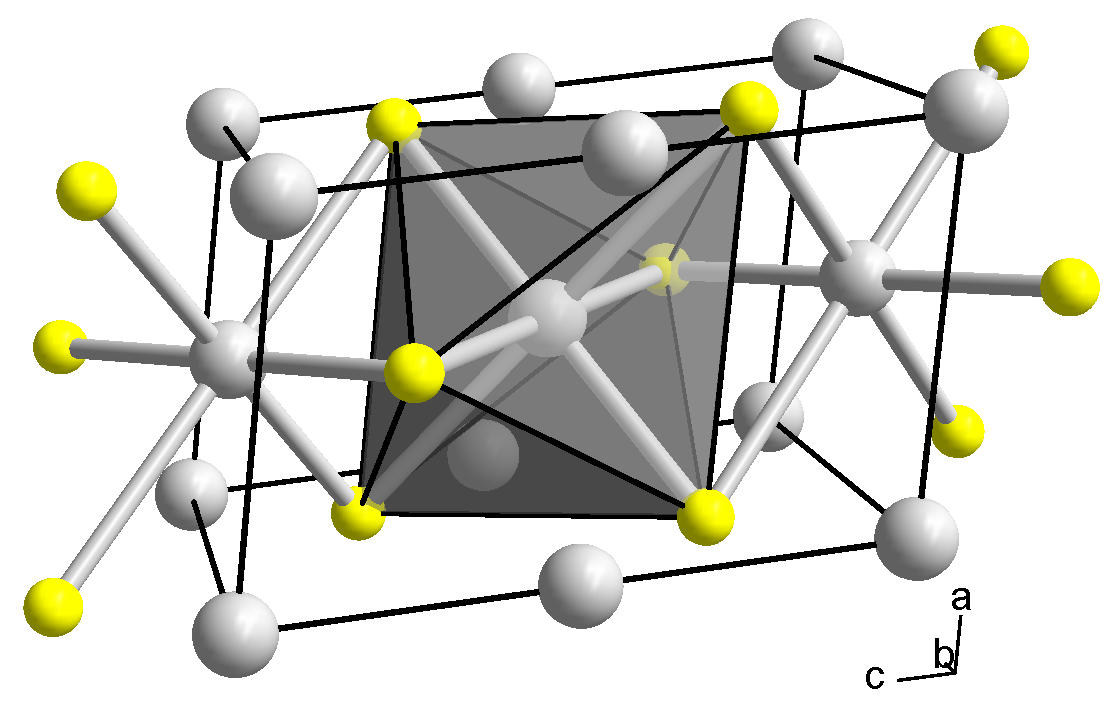

Identifiers
| CAS Number | 12018-06-3 |
| 3D model (JSmol) | Interactive image |
| ChemSpider | 10129648 |
| PubChem CID | 11955372 |
| CompTox Dashboard (EPA) | DTXSID10923256 |
- InChI: InChI=1S/Cr.S/q+2;-2 Key: LXEAUGDQDABWTN-UHFFFAOYSA-N
- SMILES: [S-2].[Cr+2]

Properties
| Chemical formula | CrS |
| Molar mass | 84.061 g/mol |
| Appearance | Black crystals |
| Melting point | 1,550 °C (2,820 °F; 1,820 K) |
| Solubility in water | Insoluble |

Related compounds
| Related compounds | Chromium(III) sulfide |
- Except where otherwise noted, data are given for materials in their standard state (at 25 °C [77 °F], 100 kPa). Infobox references

Chromium(II) sulfide is an inorganic compound of chromium and sulfur with the chemical formula CrS. The compound forms black hexagonal crystals, insoluble in water. It is a semiconductor, and is also used as a catalyst.

== Structure ==
Chromium(II) sulfide forms black paramagnetic crystals of two crystalline modifications:

- α-CrS, superstructured phase, hexagonal system, cell parameters a = 1.200 nm, c = 1.152 nm.
- β-CrS, monoclinic system, cell parameters a = 0.594 nm, b = 0.341 nm, c = 0.563 nm, β = 91.73°.

== Synthesis ==
Chromium(II) sulfide may be formed by reaction of chromium metal with sulfur or hydrogen sulfide at high temperature. It may also be formed by reacting chromium(III) chloride with H_{2}S, reducing chromium(III) sulfide with hydrogen, or by double replacement reaction of lithium sulfide with chromium(II) chloride.

Cr + S → CrS
Cr + H_{2}S → CrS + H_{2}
2 CrCl_{3} + 3 H_{2}S → 2 CrS + S + 6 HCl
Cr_{2}S_{3} + H_{2} → 2 CrS + H_{2}S
Li_{2}S + CrCl_{2} → 2 LiCl + CrS

== Reactions ==
Chromium(II) sulfide slowly oxidizes in air:

2 CrS + 7 O_{2} → 2 Cr_{2}O_{3} + 4 SO_{2}
