= Cadmium(I) tetrachloroaluminate =

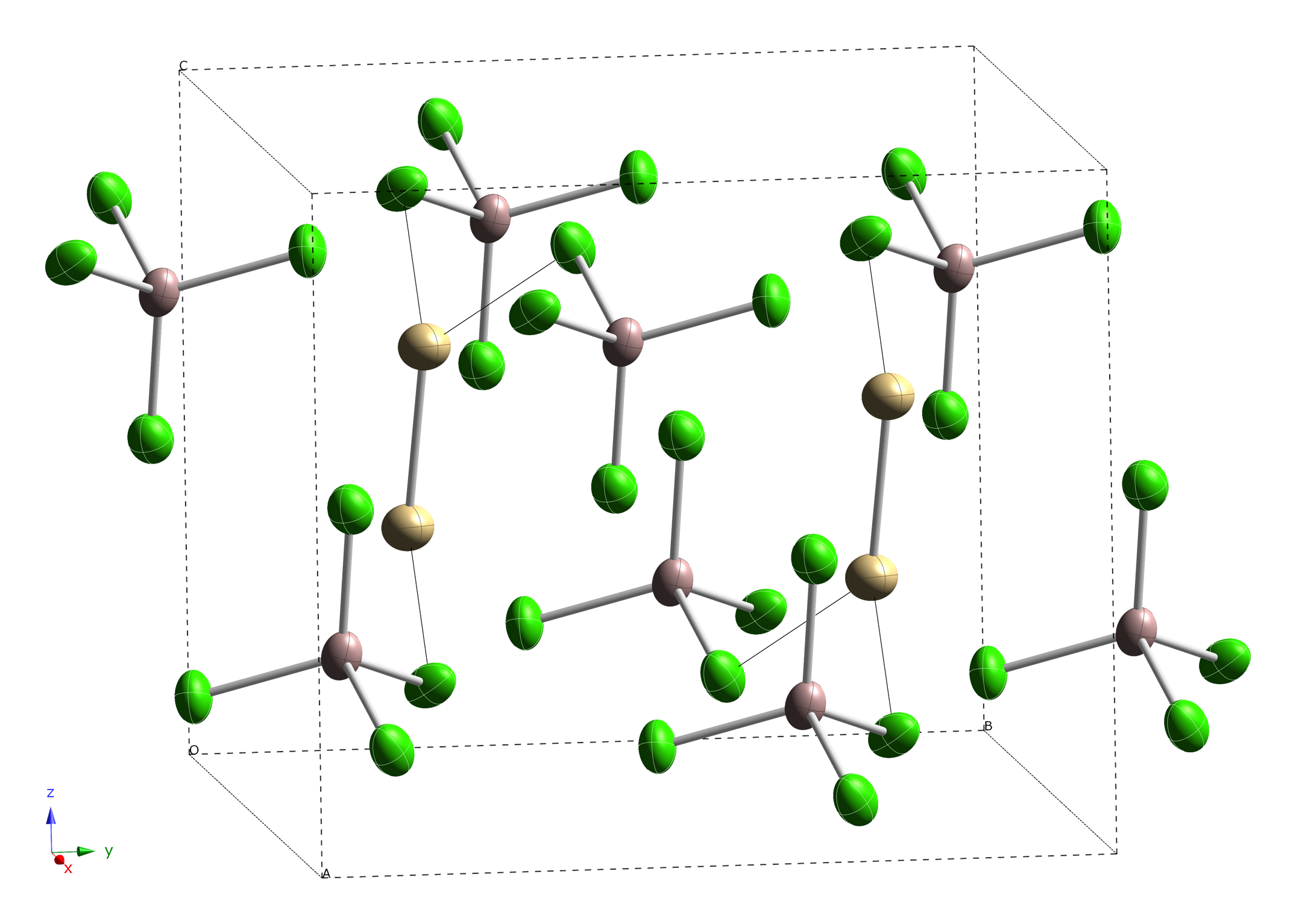

Names
- IUPAC name dicadmium(2+) bis( tetrachoridoaluminate(1−))

Identifiers
CAS Number	103823-00-3
3D model (JSmol)	Interactive image
- InChI: InChI=1S/2Al.2Cd.8ClH/h;;;;8*1H/q2*+3;2*+1;;;;;;;;/p-8 Key: MVYUNQSYEKWWLE-UHFFFAOYSA-F
- SMILES: [Cd+][Cd+].Cl[Al-](Cl)(Cl)Cl.Cl[Al-](Cl)(Cl)Cl

Properties
Chemical formula	Cd_{2}[AlCl_{4}]_{2}
Molar mass	562.4123 g/mol
Appearance	white crystal
Melting point	227 ° (decomp)

Hazards
- NIOSH (US health exposure limits)
PEL (Permissible)	[1910.1027] TWA 0.005 mg/m^{3} (as Cd)
REL (Recommended)	Ca
IDLH (Immediate danger)	Ca [9 mg/m^{3} (as Cd)]
- Except where otherwise noted, data are given for materials in their standard state (at 25 °C [77 °F], 100 kPa). verify (what is ?) Infobox references

Cadmium(I) tetrachloroaluminate is the inorganic compound with the formula Cd_{2}[AlCl_{4}]_{2}, a tetrachloroaluminate of cadmium(I). It was the first compound reported (1961) that contained cadmium in the +1 oxidation state and features a cadmium–cadmium bond.

== Preparation and properties ==
Cd_{2}[AlCl_{4}]_{2} was originally prepared by dissolving Cd metal in molten CdCl_{2} followed by the addition of AlCl_{3}.

CdCl_{2} + Cd → Cd_{2}Cl_{2}
Cd_{2}Cl_{2} + 2 AlCl_{3} → Cd_{2}[AlCl_{4}]_{2}

Subsequent studies of the Raman vibrational spectrum indicated the presence of a cadmium–cadmium bond, which was confirmed by two separate X-ray diffraction studies of single crystals. The compound can therefore be compared to mercury(I) (mercurous) compounds (such as mercury(I) chloride), which contain Hg^{2+}_{2}. The Cd−Cd single bonds are part of ethane-like Cd_{2}Cl_{6} units sharing vertices with AlCl_{4} units, with a Cd−Cd bond length reported as 257.6 pm or 256.1pm.

Cd_{2}[AlCl_{4}]_{2} is diamagnetic. It contains no unpaired electrons and reacts readily with water disproportionating to give Cd metal and Cd^{2+}.

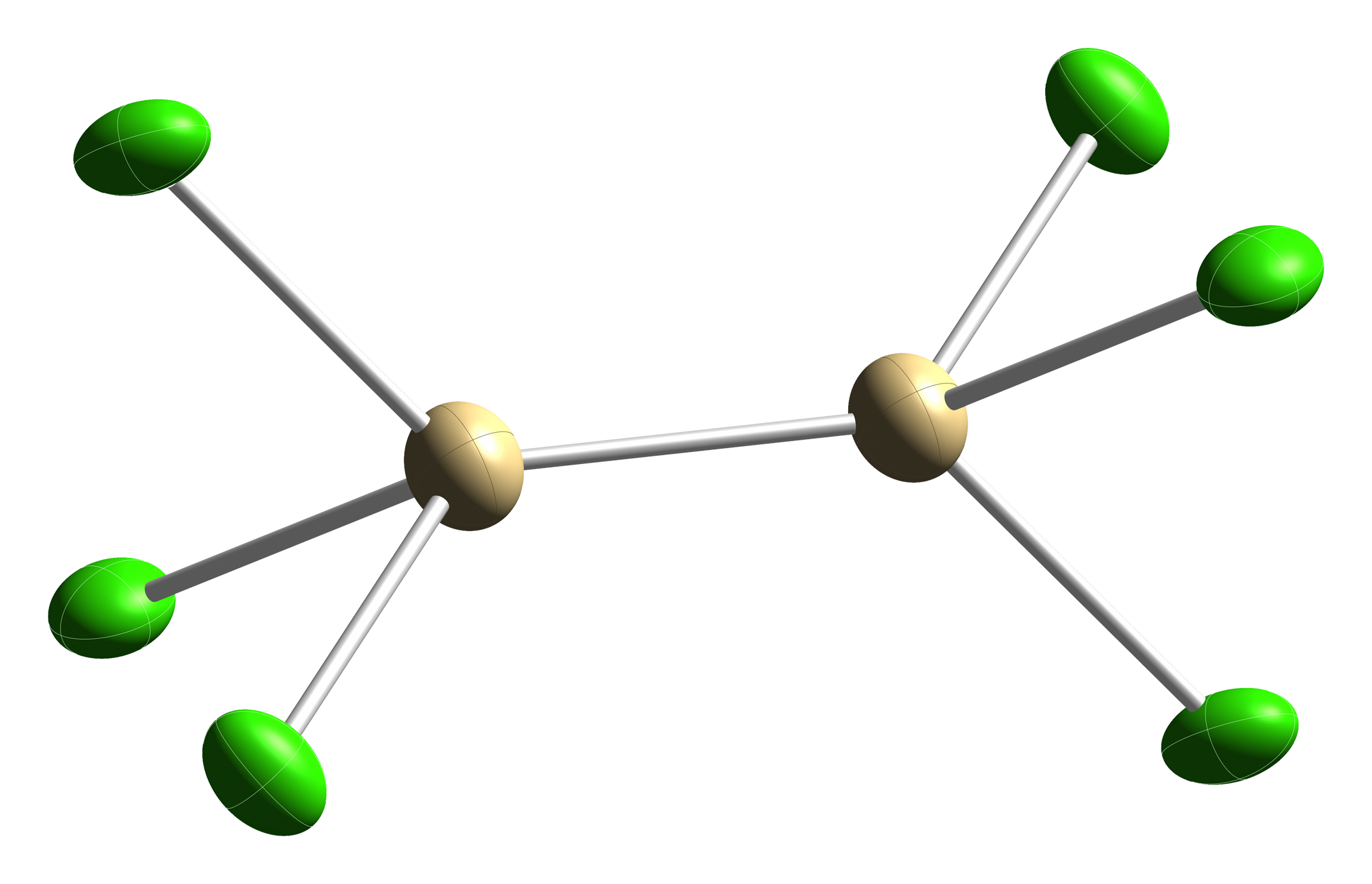
Thermal ellipsoid plot of a Cd_{2}Cl_{6} unit
