= Friedrich Stromeyer =

German chemist (1776–1835)

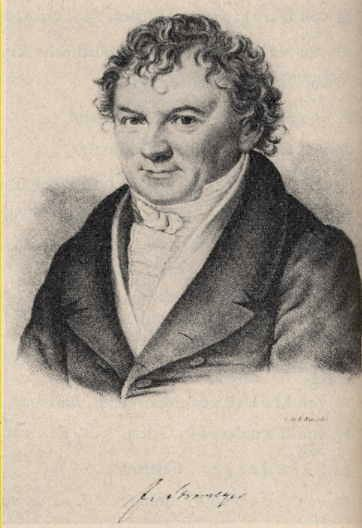
- Stromeyer, c. 1820
- Born: 2 August 1776; Göttingen, Electorate of Hanover
- Died: 18 August 1835 (aged 59); Göttingen, Kingdom of Hanover
- Education: University of Göttingen
- Known for: Discovery of Cadmium; Iodine–starch test
- Awards: FRSE (1826); ForMemRS (1827)
- Scientific career
- Fields: Chemist
- Workplaces: University of Göttingen
- Doctoral advisor: Johann Friedrich Gmelin
- Other academic advisors: Louis Nicolas Vauquelin
- Doctoral students: Robert Bunsen; Eilhard Mitscherlich

Friedrich Stromeyer (2 August 1776 – 18 August 1835) was a German chemist. He was the discoverer of cadmium.

From 1982, the Friedrich Stromeyer Prize has been awarded for chemical achievement in Germany.

== Biography ==
He was born in Göttingen on 2 August 1776 the eldest son of Dr Ernerst Johann Friedrich Stromeyer, professor of medicine at Göttingen University, and his wife, Marie Magdalena Johanne von Blum.

Stromeyer studied Chemistry and Medicine at Göttingen and Paris and received an MD degree from the University of Göttingen in 1800, studying under Johann Friedrich Gmelin and Louis Nicolas Vauquelin. He was then a professor at the university, and also served as an inspector of apothecaries. His students included Robert Bunsen.

In 1817, whilst studying compounds of zinc carbonate, Stromeyer discovered the element cadmium. Cadmium is a common impurity of zinc compounds, though often found only in minute quantities. He was also the first to recommend starch as a reagent for free iodine and he studied chemistry of arsine and bismuthate salts.

In 1819, he was the first scientist to describe the mineral eudialyte.

In 1826, he was elected a Fellow of the Royal Society of Edinburgh his proposer being Edward Turner. As his fellowship was Ordinary (rather than Foreign or Honorary) this means he was physically present in Edinburgh at that time. The following year he was elected a Foreign Fellow of the Royal Society of London.

In 1832, the mineral stromeyerite was named in his honour by mineralogist François Sulpice Beudant.

He died in Göttingen on 18 August 1835, aged 59.
