= Zinc carbonate =

- Zn^{2+} [CO_{3}^{2−}]

Identifiers
CAS Number	3486-35-9; basic: 5263-02-5
3D model (JSmol)	Interactive image
ChemSpider	17943; monohydrate: 11570234; basic: 10129674
ECHA InfoCard	100.020.435
EC Number	222-477-6; basic: 226-076-7
PubChem CID	19005; basic: 11955398
UNII	K8290PTQ4F
UN number	9157
CompTox Dashboard (EPA)	DTXSID5049817
- InChI: InChI=1S/CH2O3.Zn/c2-1(3)4;/h(H2,2,3,4);/q;+2/p-2 Key: FMRLDPWIRHBCCC-UHFFFAOYSA-L
- SMILES: C(=O)([O-])[O-].[Zn+2]

Properties
Chemical formula	ZnCO_{3}
Molar mass	125.39 g·mol^{−1}
Appearance	white solid
Density	4.434 g/cm^{3}
Melting point	140 °C (284 °F; 413 K) (decomposes)
Solubility in water	0.91 mg/L
Solubility product (K_{sp})	1.46×10^{−10}
Magnetic susceptibility (χ)	−34×10^{−6} cm^{3}/mol
Refractive index (n_{D})	n_{1}=1.621, n_{2}=1.848

Structure
Crystal structure	Calcite, hR30, No. 167
Space group	R3̅c
Lattice constant	a = 4.6528 Å, c = 15.025 Å
Formula units (Z)	6

Hazards
- GHS labelling
Pictograms	(GHS09: Environmental hazard)
Signal word	Warning
Hazard statements	H319, H410, H411
Precautionary statements	P264, P273, P280, P302+P352, P305+P351+P338, P321, P332+P313, P337+P313, P362, P391, P501
- Except where otherwise noted, data are given for materials in their standard state (at 25 °C [77 °F], 100 kPa). Infobox references

Zinc carbonate is the inorganic compound with the formula ZnCO_{3}. It is a white solid that is insoluble in water. It exists in nature as the mineral smithsonite. It is prepared by treating cold solutions of zinc sulfate with potassium bicarbonate. Upon warming, it converts to basic zinc carbonate (Zn_{5}(CO_{3})_{2}(OH)_{6}).

== Structure ==
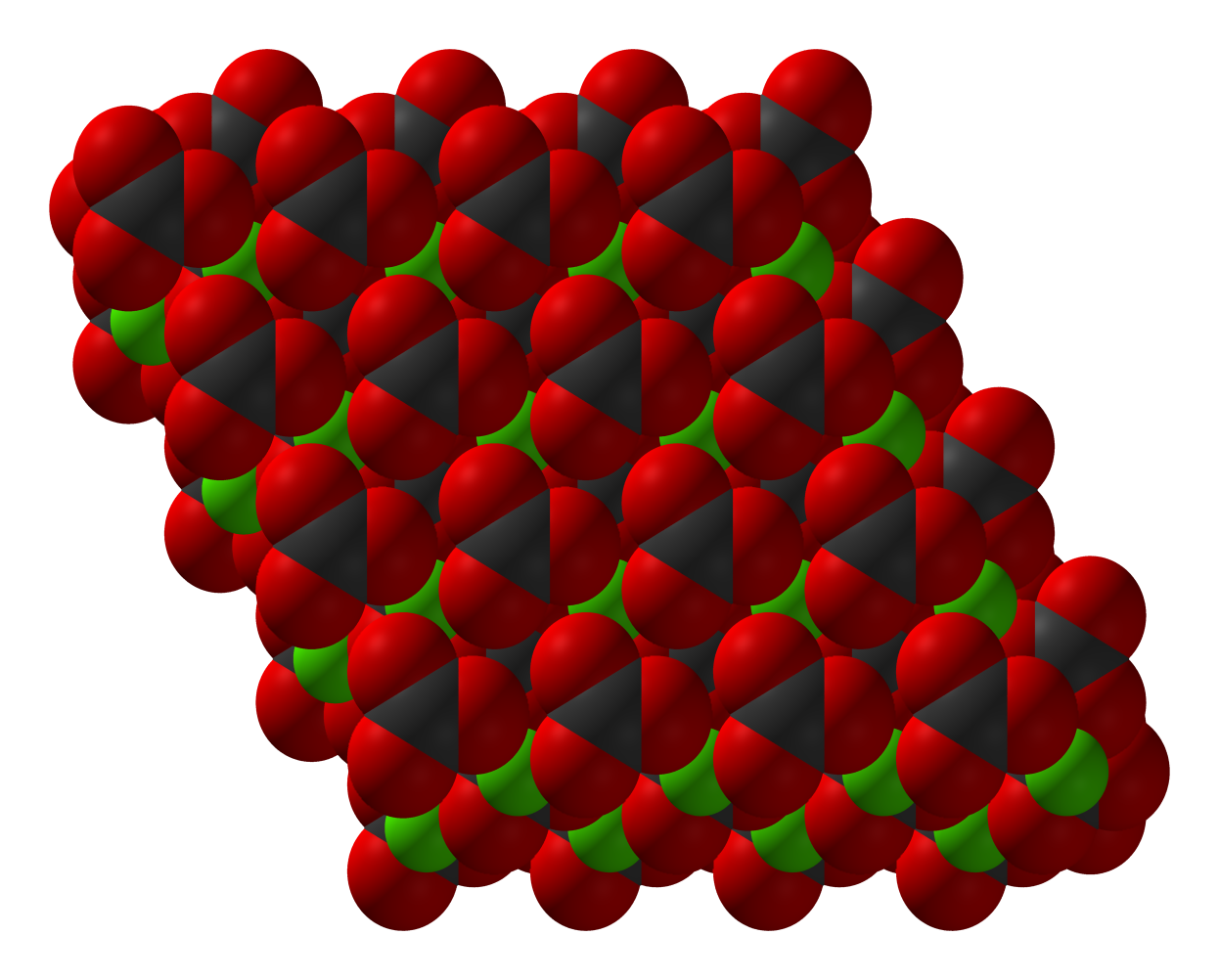
Zinc carbonate crystallizes in the same dense motif as calcium carbonate. Color code: red = O, green = Zn.

Zinc carbonate adopts the same structure as calcite (calcium carbonate). Zinc is octahedral and each carbonate is bonded to six Zn centers such that oxygen atoms are three-coordinate.

== Cited sources ==
- Haynes, William M., ed. (2016). CRC Handbook of Chemistry and Physics (97th ed.). CRC Press. ISBN 9781498754293.
