= Vanadium compounds =

Type of chemical compound

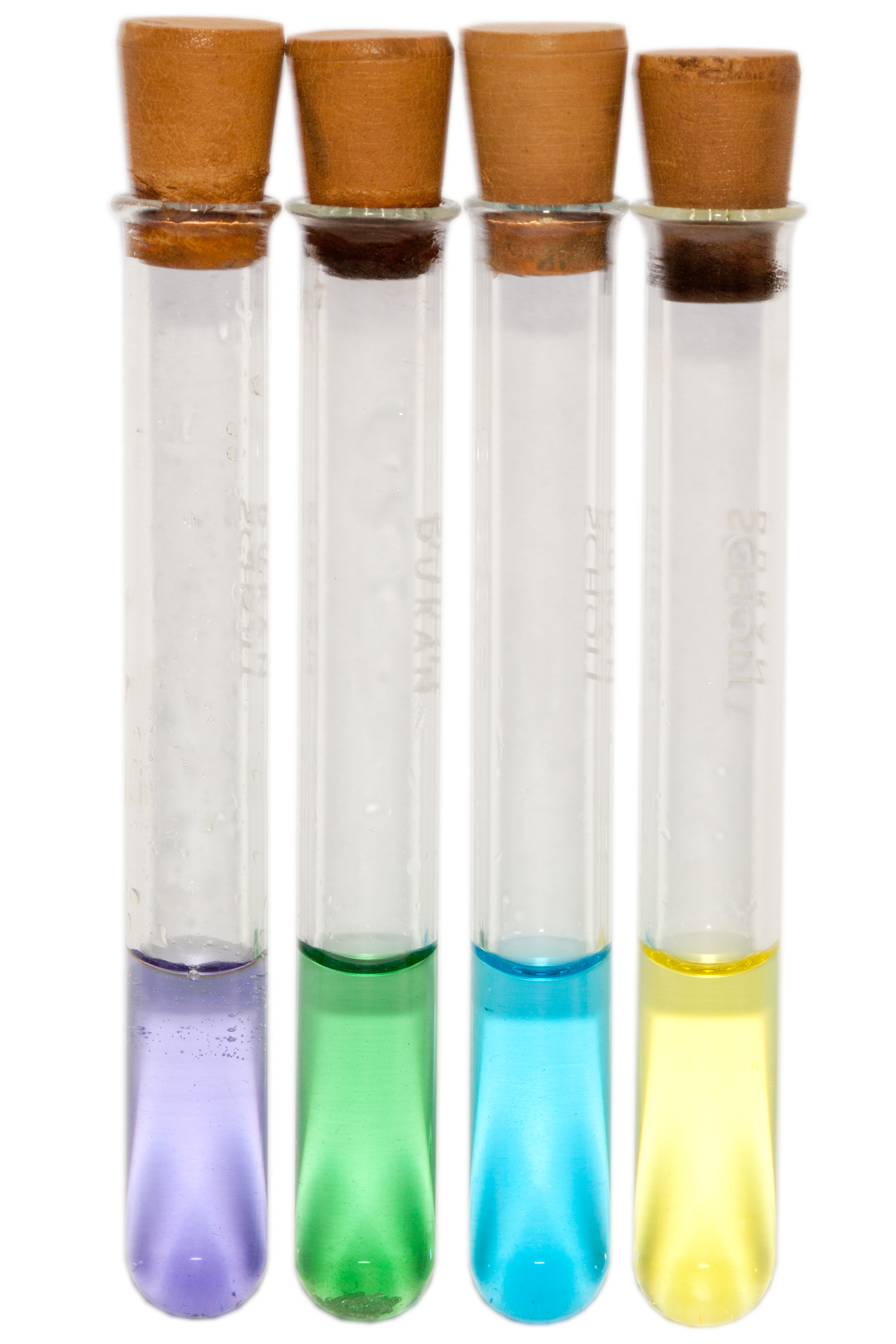
From left: [V(H_{2}O)_{6}]^{2+} (lilac), [V(H_{2}O)_{6}]^{3+} (green), [VO(H_{2}O)_{5}]^{2+} (blue) and [VO(H_{2}O)_{5}]^{3+} (yellow).

Vanadium compounds are compounds formed by the element vanadium (V). The chemistry of vanadium is noteworthy for the accessibility of the four adjacent oxidation states 2–5, whereas the chemistry of the other group 5 elements, niobium and tantalum, are somewhat more limited to the +5 oxidation state. In aqueous solution, vanadium forms metal aquo complexes of which the colours are lilac [V(H_{2}O)_{6}]^{2+}, green [V(H_{2}O)_{6}]^{3+}, blue [VO(H_{2}O)_{5}]^{2+}, yellow-orange oxides [VO(H_{2}O)_{5}]^{3+}, the formula for which depends on pH. Vanadium(II) compounds are reducing agents, and vanadium(V) compounds are oxidizing agents. Vanadium(IV) compounds often exist as vanadyl derivatives, which contain the VO^{2+} center.

Ammonium vanadate(V) (NH_{4}VO_{3}) can be successively reduced with elemental zinc to obtain the different colors of vanadium in these four oxidation states. Lower oxidation states occur in compounds such as V(CO)_{6}, [V(CO)_{6}]^{−} and substituted derivatives.

Vanadium pentoxide is a commercially important catalyst for the production of sulfuric acid, a reaction that exploits the ability of vanadium oxides to undergo redox reactions.

The vanadium redox battery utilizes all four oxidation states: one electrode uses the +5/+4 couple and the other uses the +3/+2 couple. Conversion of these oxidation states is illustrated by the reduction of a strongly acidic solution of a vanadium(V) compound with zinc dust or amalgam. The initial yellow color characteristic of the pervanadyl ion [VO_{2}(H_{2}O)_{4}]^{+} is replaced by the blue color of [VO(H_{2}O)_{5}]^{2+}, followed by the green color of [V(H_{2}O)_{6}]^{3+} and then the violet color of [V(H_{2}O)_{6}]^{2+}.

== Oxyanions ==
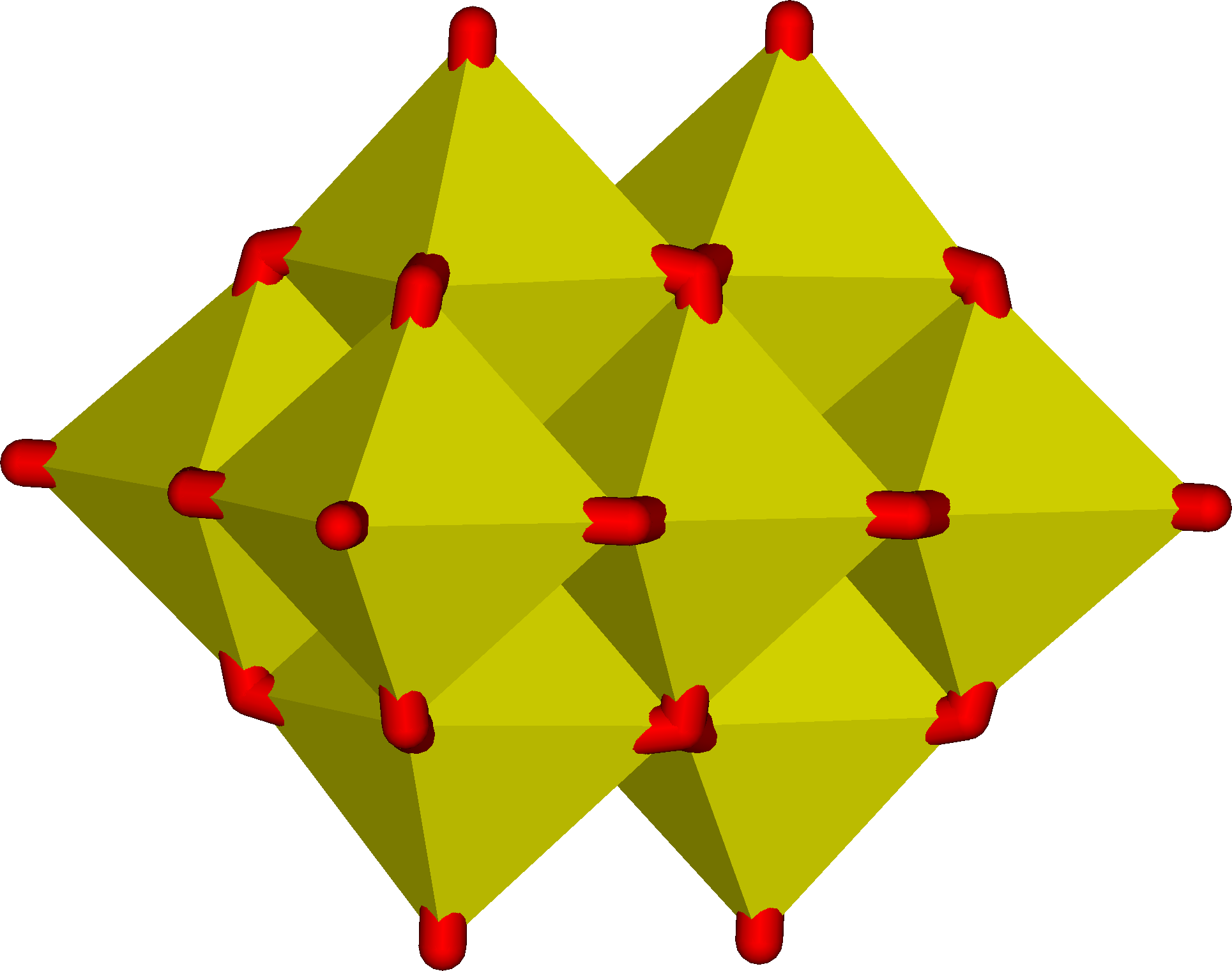
The decavanadate structure

In aqueous solution, vanadium(V) forms an extensive family of oxyanions as established by ^{51}V NMR spectroscopy. The interrelationships in this family are described by the predominance diagram, which shows at least 11 species, depending on pH and concentration. The tetrahedral orthovanadate ion, VO^{3−}_{4}, is the principal species present at pH 12–14. Similar in size and charge to phosphorus(V), vanadium(V) also parallels its chemistry and crystallography. Orthovanadate VO^{3−}_{4} is used in protein crystallography to study the biochemistry of phosphate. Beside that, this anion also has been shown to interact with activity of some specific enzymes. The tetrathiovanadate [VS_{4}]^{3−} is analogous to the orthovanadate ion.

At lower pH values, the monomer [HVO_{4}]^{2−} and dimer [V_{2}O_{7}]^{4−} are formed, with the monomer predominant at vanadium concentration of less than c. 10^{−2}M (pV > 2, where pV is equal to the minus value of the logarithm of the total vanadium concentration/M). The formation of the divanadate ion is analogous to the formation of the dichromate ion. As the pH is reduced, further protonation and condensation to polyvanadates occur: at pH 4-6 [H_{2}VO_{4}]^{−} is predominant at pV greater than ca. 4, while at higher concentrations trimers and tetramers are formed. Between pH 2-4 decavanadate predominates, its formation from orthovanadate is represented by this condensation reaction:

10 [VO_{4}]^{3−} + 24 H^{+} → [V_{10}O_{28}]^{6−} + 12 H_{2}O

In decavanadate, each V(V) center is surrounded by six oxide ligands. Vanadic acid, H_{3}VO_{4} exists only at very low concentrations because protonation of the tetrahedral species [H_{2}VO_{4}]^{−} results in the preferential formation of the octahedral [VO_{2}(H_{2}O)_{4}]^{+} species. In strongly acidic solutions, pH < 2, [VO_{2}(H_{2}O)_{4}]^{+} is the predominant species, while the oxide V_{2}O_{5} precipitates from solution at high concentrations. The oxide is formally the acid anhydride of vanadic acid. The structures of many vanadate compounds have been determined by X-ray crystallography.

The Pourbaix diagram for vanadium in water, which shows the redox potentials between various vanadium species in different oxidation states.

Vanadium(V) forms various peroxo complexes, most notably in the active site of the vanadium-containing bromoperoxidase enzymes. The species VO(O)_{2}(H_{2}O)_{4}^{+} is stable in acidic solutions. In alkaline solutions, species with 2, 3 and 4 peroxide groups are known; the last forms violet salts with the formula M_{3}V(O_{2})_{4} nH_{2}O (M= Li, Na, etc.), in which the vanadium has an 8-coordinate dodecahedral structure.

== Halide derivatives ==
Twelve binary halides, compounds with the formula VX_{n} (n=2..5), are known. VI_{4}, VCl_{5}, VBr_{5}, and VI_{5} do not exist or are extremely unstable. In combination with other reagents, VCl_{4} is used as a catalyst for polymerization of dienes. Like all binary halides, those of vanadium are Lewis acidic, especially those of V(IV) and V(V). Many of the halides form octahedral complexes with the formula VX_{n}L_{6−n} (X= halide; L= other ligand).

Many vanadium oxyhalides (formula VO_{m}X_{n}) are known. The oxytrichloride and oxytrifluoride (VOCl_{3} and VOF_{3}) are the most widely studied. Akin to POCl_{3}, they are volatile, adopt tetrahedral structures in the gas phase, and are Lewis acidic.

== Coordination compounds ==
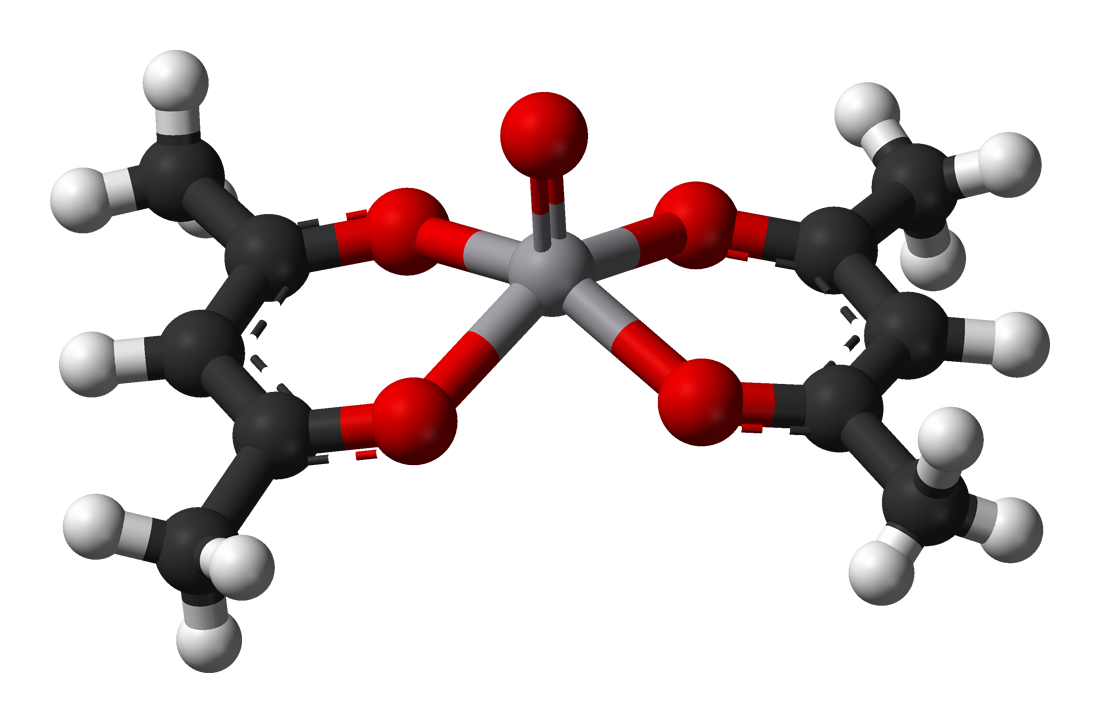
A ball-and-stick model of VO(O_{2}C_{5}H_{7})_{2}.

Complexes of vanadium(II) and (III) are relatively exchange inert and reducing. Those of V(IV) and V(V) are oxidants. Vanadium ion is rather large and some complexes achieve coordination numbers greater than 6, as is the case in [V(CN)_{7}]^{4−}. Oxovanadium(V) also forms 7 coordinate coordination complexes with tetradentate ligands and peroxides and these complexes are used for oxidative brominations and thioether oxidations. The coordination chemistry of V^{4+} is dominated by the vanadyl center, VO^{2+}, which binds four other ligands strongly and one weakly (the one trans to the vanadyl center). An example is vanadyl acetylacetonate (V(O)(O_{2}C_{5}H_{7})_{2}). In this complex, the vanadium is 5-coordinate, distorted square pyramidal, meaning that a sixth ligand, such as pyridine, may be attached, though the association constant of this process is small. Many 5-coordinate vanadyl complexes have a trigonal bipyramidal geometry, such as VOCl_{2}(NMe_{3})_{2}. The coordination chemistry of V^{5+} is dominated by the relatively stable dioxovanadium coordination complexes which are often formed by aerial oxidation of the vanadium(IV) precursors indicating the stability of the +5 oxidation state and ease of interconversion between the +4 and +5 states.

== Organometallic compounds ==
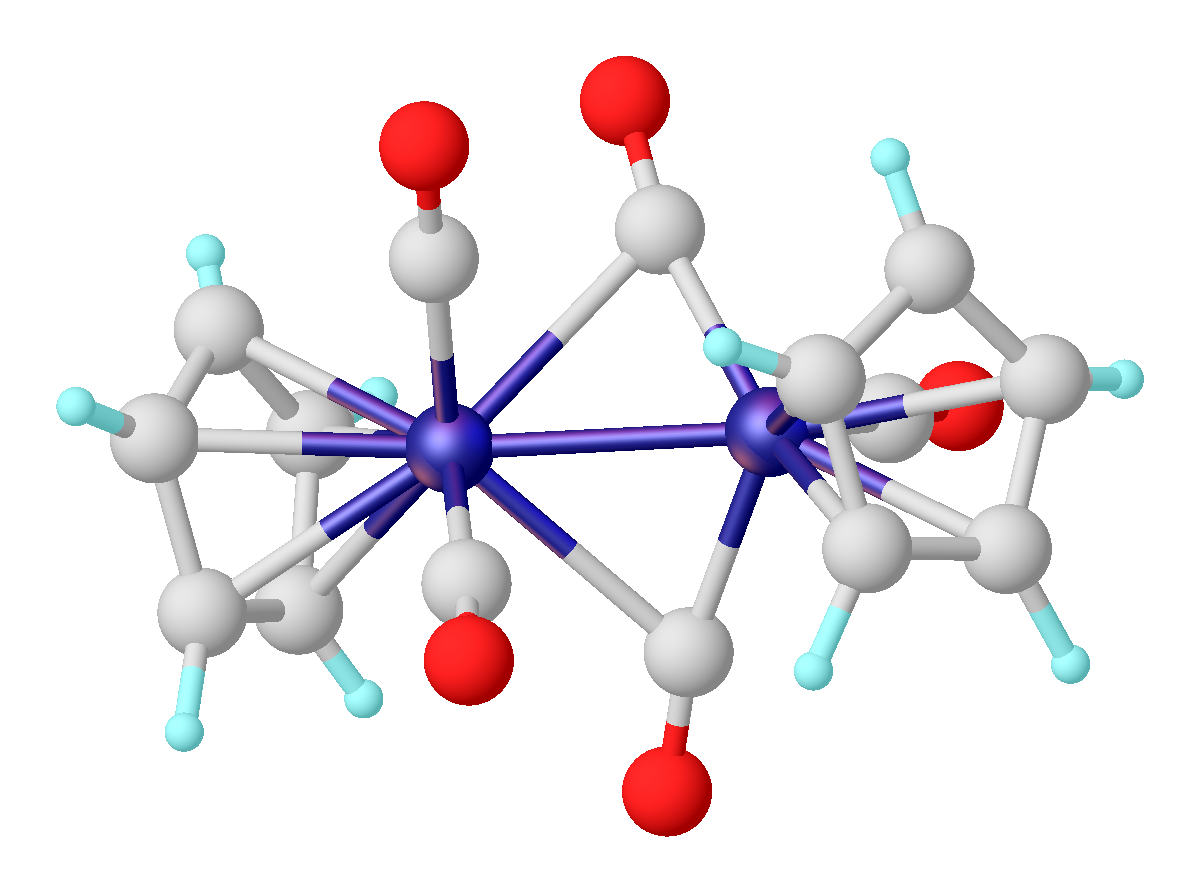
Cp_{2}V_{2}(CO)_{5} featuring a pair of semi-bridging CO ligands.

Organovanadium chemistry is the chemistry of organometallic compounds containing a carbon (C) to vanadium (V) chemical bond. Organovanadium compounds find only minor use as reagents in organic synthesis but are significant for polymer chemistry as catalysts. Vanadocene dichloride is a versatile starting reagent and has applications in organic chemistry. Vanadium carbonyl, V(CO)_{6}, is a rare example of a paramagnetic metal carbonyl. Reduction yields V(CO)^{−}_{6} (isoelectronic with Cr(CO)_{6}), which may be further reduced with sodium in liquid ammonia to yield V(CO)^{3−}_{5} (isoelectronic with Fe(CO)_{5}).

Vanadocene is the lightest transition metal metallocene that is isolable at room temperature. Vanadocene reacts with high pressures of carbon monoxide to give CpV(CO)_{4}. Photolysis of the tetracarbonyl gives Cp_{2}V_{2}(CO)_{5}.

Well-defined vanadium compounds do not appear as catalysts in any commercial process. However organovanadium species are clearly implicated as catalysts for the production of butadiene-based rubbers. These catalysts are generated in situ by treating soluble coordination complexes such as vanadium(III) acetylacetonate with organoaluminium activators.

== See also ==
- Titanium compounds
- Chromium compounds
