= Vanadium(III) acetylacetonate =

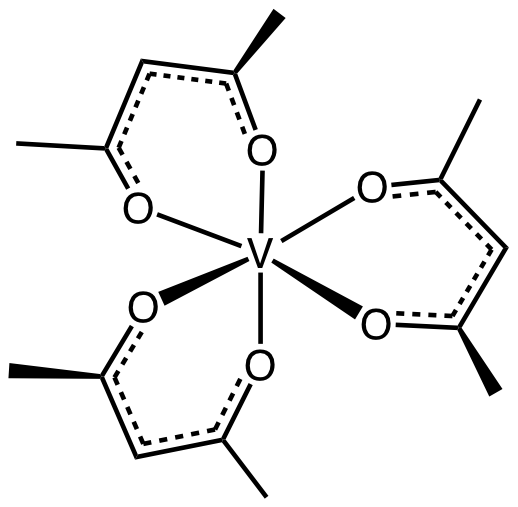

Names
- IUPAC name Tris(acetylacetonato)vanadium(III)
- Systematic IUPAC name Tris[(Z)-4-oxopent-2-en-2-olato-κ^{2}O,O′]vanadium(III)
- Other names: Vanadium tris(2,4-pentanedionate); Tris(2,4-pentanedionato) vanadium; Vanadium acetylacetonate; Vanadium tris(acetylacetonate)

Identifiers
CAS Number	13476-99-8
3D model (JSmol)	Interactive image
ChemSpider	22199456
ECHA InfoCard	100.033.403
EC Number	236-759-1
PubChem CID	5377225
UNII	2B8X59QLY5
- InChI: InChI=1S/3C5H8O2.V/c3*1-4(6)3-5(2)7;/h3*3,6H,1-2H3;/b3*4-3-; Key: MFWFDRBPQDXFRC-LNTINUHCSA-N
- SMILES: CC(=CC(=O)C)O.CC(=CC(=O)C)O.CC(=CC(=O)C)O.[V]

Properties
Chemical formula	C_{15}H_{21}O_{6}V
Molar mass	348.269 g·mol^{−1}
Appearance	Brown solid
Density	1.334 g/cm^{3}
Melting point	184 °C (363 °F; 457 K)

Hazards
- GHS labelling
Pictograms	(GHS05: Corrosive) (GHS06: Toxic) (GHS07: Exclamation mark)
Signal word	Danger
Hazard statements	H301, H311, H315, H318, H319, H330, H335
Precautionary statements	P260, P264, P270, P271, P280, P284, P301+P310, P302+P352, P304+P340, P305+P351+P338, P310, P312, P320, P321, P330, P332+P313, P337+P313, P361, P362, P363, P403+P233, P405, P501
- Except where otherwise noted, data are given for materials in their standard state (at 25 °C [77 °F], 100 kPa). Infobox references

Vanadium(III) acetylacetonate is the coordination compound with the formula V(C_{5}H_{7}O_{2})_{3}, sometimes designated as V(acac)_{3}. It is an orange-brown solid that is soluble in organic solvents.

== Structure and synthesis ==
The complex has idealized D_{3} symmetry. Like other V(III) compounds, it has a triplet ground state.

The compound is prepared by reduction of ammonium vanadate in the presence of acetylacetone.

== Applications and research ==
V(acac)_{3} is a common precatalyst for the production of EPDM polymers.

It has also been shown to be a precursor to vanadium pentoxide nanostructures.
