= Vanadium =

Vanadium, _{23}V
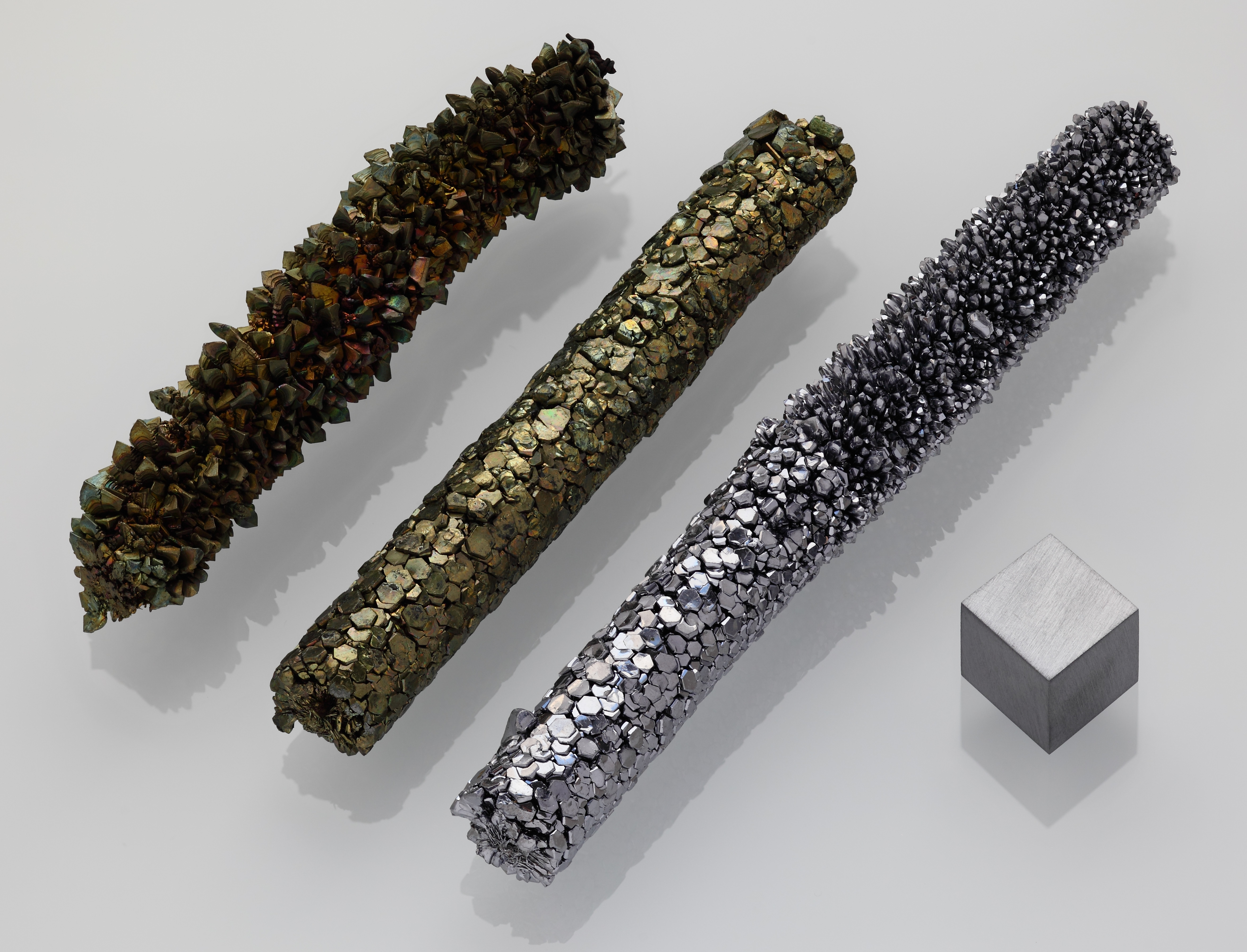

Vanadium
- Pronunciation: /vəˈneɪdiəm/ (və-NAY-dee-əm)
- Appearance: blue-silver-grey metal

Standard atomic weight A_{r}°(V)
- 50.9415±0.0001; 50.942±0.001 (abridged)

Vanadium in the periodic table
| Hydrogen | | | | | | | | | | | | | | | | | | | | | | | | | | | | | | | Helium |
| Lithium | Beryllium | | | | | | | | | | | | | | | | | | | | | | | | | Boron | Carbon | Nitrogen | Oxygen | Fluorine | Neon |
| Sodium | Magnesium | | | | | | | | | | | | | | | | | | | | | | | | | Aluminium | Silicon | Phosphorus | Sulfur | Chlorine | Argon |
| Potassium | Calcium | | | | | | | | | | | | | | | Scandium | Titanium | Vanadium | Chromium | Manganese | Iron | Cobalt | Nickel | Copper | Zinc | Gallium | Germanium | Arsenic | Selenium | Bromine | Krypton |
| Rubidium | Strontium | | | | | | | | | | | | | | | Yttrium | Zirconium | Niobium | Molybdenum | Technetium | Ruthenium | Rhodium | Palladium | Silver | Cadmium | Indium | Tin | Antimony | Tellurium | Iodine | Xenon |
| Caesium | Barium | Lanthanum | Cerium | Praseodymium | Neodymium | Promethium | Samarium | Europium | Gadolinium | Terbium | Dysprosium | Holmium | Erbium | Thulium | Ytterbium | Lutetium | Hafnium | Tantalum | Tungsten | Rhenium | Osmium | Iridium | Platinum | Gold | Mercury (element) | Thallium | Lead | Bismuth | Polonium | Astatine | Radon |
| Francium | Radium | Actinium | Thorium | Protactinium | Uranium | Neptunium | Plutonium | Americium | Curium | Berkelium | Californium | Einsteinium | Fermium | Mendelevium | Nobelium | Lawrencium | Rutherfordium | Dubnium | Seaborgium | Bohrium | Hassium | Meitnerium | Darmstadtium | Roentgenium | Copernicium | Nihonium | Flerovium | Moscovium | Livermorium | Tennessine | Oganesson |
–
↑
V
↓
Nb
titanium ← vanadium → chromium
- Atomic number (Z): 23
- Group: group 5
- Period: period 4
- Block: d-block
- Electron configuration: [Ar] 3d^{3} 4s^{2}
- Electrons per shell: 2, 8, 11, 2

Physical properties
- Phase at STP: solid
- Melting point: 2183 K (1910 °C, 3470 °F)
- Boiling point: 3680 K (3407 °C, 6165 °F)
- Density (at 20° C): 6.099 g/cm^{3}
- when liquid (at m.p.): 5.5 g/cm^{3}
- Heat of fusion: 21.5 kJ/mol
- Heat of vaporization: 444 kJ/mol
- Molar heat capacity: 24.89 J/(mol·K)
- Specific heat capacity: 488.595 J/(kg·K)
Vapor pressure
| P (Pa) | 1 | 10 | 100 | 1 k | 10 k | 100 k |
|---|---|---|---|---|---|---|
| at T (K) | 2101 | 2289 | 2523 | 2814 | 3187 | 3679 |

Atomic properties
- Oxidation states: common: +5 −3, −1, 0, +1, +2, +3, +4
- Electronegativity: Pauling scale: 1.63
- Ionization energies: 1st: 650.9 kJ/mol; 2nd: 1414 kJ/mol; 3rd: 2830 kJ/mol; (more)
- Atomic radius: empirical: 134 pm
- Covalent radius: 153±8 pm
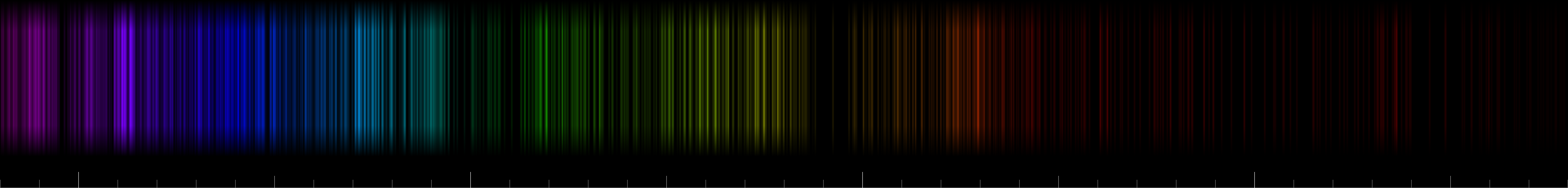
- Spectral lines of vanadium

Other properties
- Natural occurrence: primordial
- Crystal structure: body-centered cubic (bcc) (cI2)
- Lattice constant: a = 302.72 pm (at 20 °C)
- Thermal expansion: 8.77×10^{−6}/K (at 20 °C)
- Thermal conductivity: 30.7 W/(m⋅K)
- Electrical resistivity: 197 nΩ⋅m (at 20 °C)
- Magnetic ordering: paramagnetic
- Molar magnetic susceptibility: +255.0×10^{−6} cm^{3}/mol (298 K)
- Young's modulus: 128 GPa
- Shear modulus: 47 GPa
- Bulk modulus: 160 GPa
- Speed of sound thin rod: 4560 m/s (at 20 °C)
- Poisson ratio: 0.37
- Mohs hardness: 6.7
- Vickers hardness: 628–640 MPa
- Brinell hardness: 600–742 MPa
- CAS Number: 7440-62-2

History
- Naming: after Vanadís, the Norse goddess of beauty, because of the wide range of its compounds' colors
- Discovery: Andrés Manuel del Río (1801)
- First isolation: Henry Enfield Roscoe (1867)
- Named by: Nils Gabriel Sefström (1830)

Isotopes of vanadium
| Main isotopes | | | Decay | |
| Isotope | abundance | half-life (t_{1/2}) | mode | product |
|---|---|---|---|---|
| ^{48}V | synth | 15.97 d | β^{+} | ^{48}Ti |
| ^{49}V | synth | 330 d | ε | ^{49}Ti |
| ^{50}V | 0.25% | 2.71×10^{17} y | β^{+} | ^{50}Ti |
| ^{51}V | 99.75% | stable | | |

Vanadium is a chemical element; it has symbol V and atomic number 23. It is a hard, silvery-grey, malleable transition metal. The elemental metal is rarely found in nature, but once isolated artificially, the formation of an oxide layer (passivation) somewhat stabilizes the free metal against further oxidation.

Spanish scientist Andrés Manuel del Río discovered compounds of vanadium in 1801 by analyzing a new lead-bearing mineral he called "brown lead". Though he initially presumed its qualities were due to the presence of a new element, he was later erroneously convinced by French chemist Hippolyte Victor Collet-Descotils that the element was just chromium. Then in 1830, Nils Gabriel Sefström generated chlorides of vanadium, thus proving there was a new element, and named it "vanadium" after the Scandinavian goddess of beauty and fertility, Vanadís (Freyja). The name was based on the wide range of colors found in vanadium compounds. Del Río's lead mineral was ultimately named vanadinite for its vanadium content. In 1867, Henry Enfield Roscoe obtained the pure element.

Vanadium occurs naturally in about 65 minerals and fossil fuel deposits. It is produced in China and Russia from steel smelter slag. Other countries produce it either from magnetite directly, flue dust of heavy oil, or as a byproduct of uranium mining. It is mainly used to produce specialty steel alloys such as high-speed tool steels, and some aluminium alloys. The most important industrial vanadium compound, vanadium pentoxide, is used as a catalyst for the production of sulfuric acid. The vanadium redox battery for energy storage may be an important application in the future.

Large amounts of vanadium ions are found in a few organisms, possibly as a toxin. The oxide and some other salts of vanadium have moderate toxicity. Particularly in the ocean, vanadium is used by some life forms as an active center of enzymes, such as the vanadium bromoperoxidase of some ocean algae.

== History ==
Vanadium was discovered in Mexico in 1801 by the Spanish mineralogist Andrés Manuel del Río. Del Río extracted the element from a sample of Mexican "brown lead" ore, later named vanadinite. He found that its salts exhibit a wide variety of colors, and as a result, he named the element panchromium (Greek: παγχρώμιο "all colors"). Later, del Río renamed the element erythronium (Greek: ερυθρός "red") because most of the salts turned red upon heating. In 1805, French chemist Hippolyte Victor Collet-Descotils, backed by del Río's friend Baron Alexander von Humboldt, incorrectly declared that del Río's new element was an impure sample of chromium. Del Río accepted Collet-Descotils' statement and retracted his claim.

In 1831 Swedish chemist Nils Gabriel Sefström rediscovered the element in a new oxide he found while working with iron ores. Later that year, Friedrich Wöhler confirmed that this element was identical to that found by del Río and hence confirmed del Río's earlier work. Sefström chose a name beginning with V, which had not yet been assigned to any element. He called the element vanadium after Old Norse Vanadís (another name for the Norse Vanir goddess Freyja, whose attributes include beauty and fertility), because of the many beautifully colored chemical compounds it produces. On learning of Wöhler's findings, del Río began to passionately argue that his old claim be recognized, but the element kept the name vanadium. In 1831, the geologist George William Featherstonhaugh suggested that vanadium should be renamed "rionium" after del Río, but this suggestion was not followed.

As vanadium is usually found combined with other elements, the isolation of vanadium metal was difficult. In 1831, Berzelius reported the production of the metal, but Henry Enfield Roscoe showed that Berzelius had produced the nitride, vanadium nitride (VN). Roscoe eventually produced the metal in 1867 by reduction of vanadium(II) chloride, VCl_{2}, with hydrogen. In 1927, pure vanadium was produced by reducing vanadium pentoxide with calcium.

The first large-scale industrial use of vanadium was in the steel alloy chassis of the Ford Model T, inspired by French race cars. Vanadium steel allowed reduced weight while increasing tensile strength (c. 1905). For the first decade of the 20th century, most vanadium ore was mined by the American Vanadium Company from the Minas Ragra in Peru. Later, the demand for uranium rose, leading to increased mining of that metal's ores. One major uranium ore was carnotite, which also contains vanadium. Thus, vanadium became available as a by-product of uranium production. Eventually, uranium mining began to supply a large share of the demand for vanadium.

In 1911, German chemist Martin Henze discovered vanadium in the hemovanadin proteins found in blood cells (or coelomic cells) of Ascidiacea (sea squirts).

== Characteristics ==
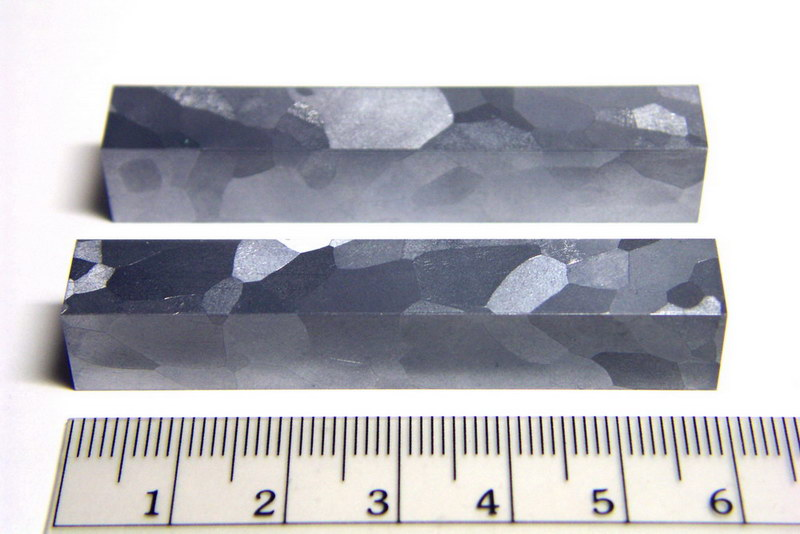
Polycrystalline high-purity (99.95%) vanadium cuboids, ebeam remelted and macro-etched

Vanadium is an average-hard, ductile, steel-blue metal. Vanadium is usually described as "soft", because it is ductile, malleable, and not brittle. Vanadium is harder than most metals and steels (see Hardnesses of the elements (data page) and iron). It has good resistance to corrosion and it is stable against alkalis and sulfuric and hydrochloric acids. It is oxidized in air at about 933 K (660 °C, 1220 °F), although an oxide passivation layer forms even at room temperature. It also reacts with hydrogen peroxide.

=== Isotopes ===
Naturally occurring vanadium is composed of one stable isotope, ^{51}V, and one radioactive isotope, ^{50}V. The latter has a half-life of 2.71×10^{17} years and a natural abundance of 0.25%. ^{51}V has a nuclear spin of 7/2 and can be used for NMR spectroscopy. Twenty-five artificial radioisotopes have been characterized, ranging in mass number from 42 to 68. The most stable of these isotopes are ^{49}V with a half-life of 330 days, and ^{48}V with a half-life of 15.97 days. The remaining radioactive isotopes have half-lives shorter than an hour, most below 10 seconds. Electron capture is the main decay mode for isotopes lighter than ^{51}V. For the heavier ones, the most common mode is beta decay.

== Compounds ==
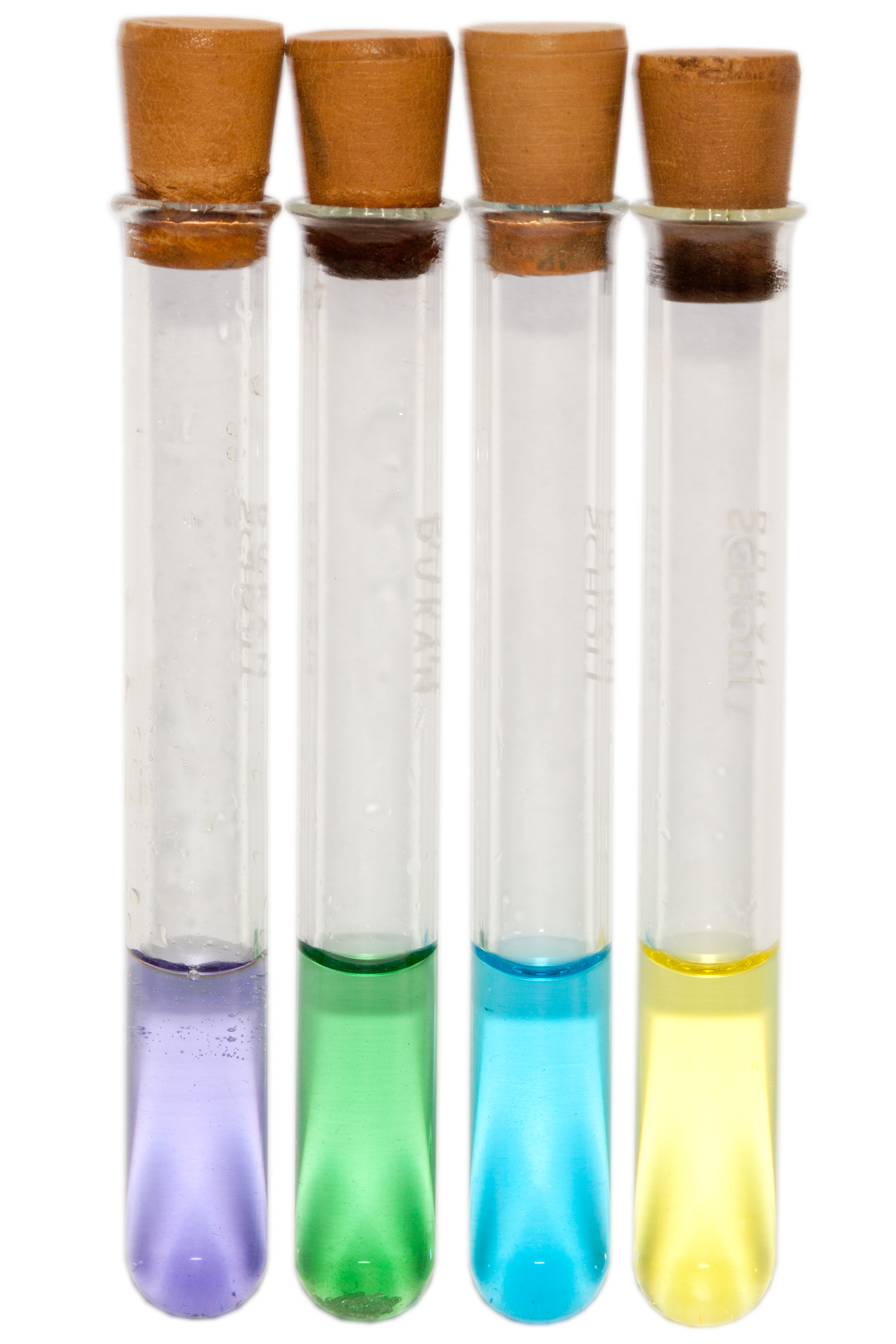
From left: [V(H_{2}O)_{6}]^{2+} (lilac), [V(H_{2}O)_{6}]^{3+} (green), [VO(H_{2}O)_{5}]^{2+} (blue) and [VO(H_{2}O)_{5}]^{3+} (yellow)

The chemistry of vanadium is noteworthy for the accessibility of the four adjacent oxidation states 2–5. In an aqueous solution, vanadium forms metal aquo complexes of which the colors are lilac [V(H_{2}O)_{6}]^{2+}, green [V(H_{2}O)_{6}]^{3+}, blue [VO(H_{2}O)_{5}]^{2+}, yellow-orange oxides [VO(H_{2}O)_{5}]^{3+}, the formula for which depends on pH. Vanadium(II) compounds are reducing agents, and vanadium(V) compounds are oxidizing agents. Vanadium(IV) compounds often exist as vanadyl derivatives, which contain the VO^{2+} center.

Ammonium vanadate(V) (NH_{4}VO_{3}) can be successively reduced with elemental zinc to obtain the different colors of vanadium in these four oxidation states. Lower oxidation states occur in compounds such as V(CO)_{6}, [V(CO)_{6}]^{−} and substituted derivatives.

Vanadium pentoxide is a commercially important catalyst for the production of sulfuric acid, a reaction that exploits the ability of vanadium oxides to undergo redox reactions.

The vanadium redox battery utilizes all four oxidation states: one electrode uses the +5/+4 couple and the other uses the +3/+2 couple. Conversion of these oxidation states is illustrated by the reduction of a strongly acidic solution of a vanadium(V) compound with zinc dust or amalgam. The initial yellow color characteristic of the pervanadyl ion [VO_{2}(H_{2}O)_{4}]^{+} is replaced by the blue color of [VO(H_{2}O)_{5}]^{2+}, followed by the green color of [V(H_{2}O)_{6}]^{3+} and then the violet color of [V(H_{2}O)_{6}]^{2+}. Another potential vanadium battery based on VB_{2} uses multiple oxidation state to allow for 11 electrons to be released per VB_{2}, giving it a higher energy capacity than gasoline, and an order of magnitude higher than Li-ion batteries. VB_{2} batteries can be further enhanced as air batteries, allowing for even higher energy density and lower weight than lithium battery or gasoline, even though recharging remains a challenge.

=== Oxyanions ===
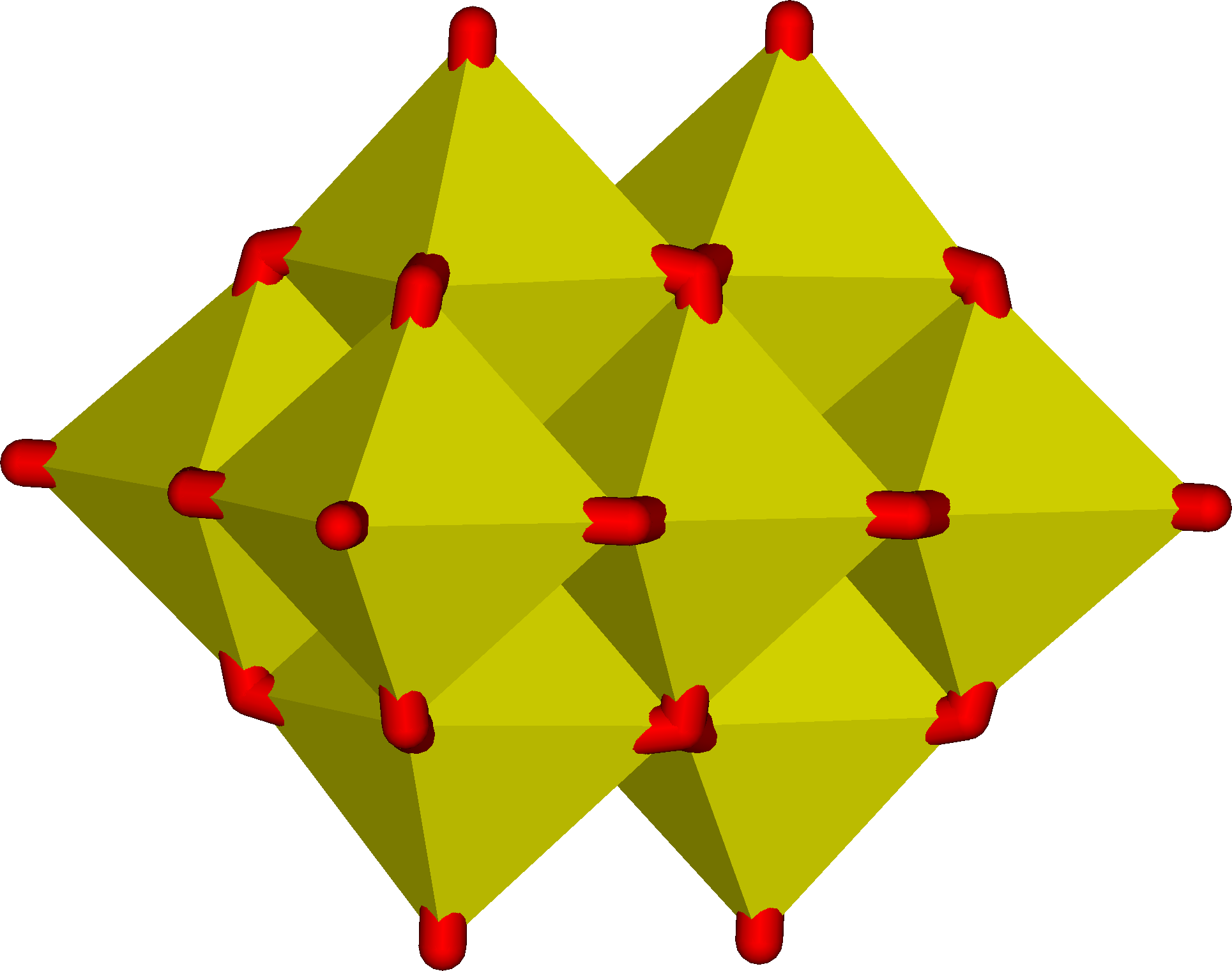
The decavanadate structure

In an aqueous solution, vanadium(V) forms an extensive family of oxyanions as established by ^{51}V NMR spectroscopy. The interrelationships in this family are described by the predominance diagram, which shows at least 11 species, depending on pH and concentration. The tetrahedral orthovanadate ion, VO_{4}^{3−}, is the principal species present at pH 12–14. Similar in size and charge to phosphorus(V), vanadium(V) also parallels its chemistry and crystallography. Orthovanadate Na_{3}VO_{4} is used in protein crystallography to study the biochemistry of phosphate. Besides that, this anion also has been shown to interact with the activity of some specific enzymes. The tetrathiovanadate VS_{4}^{3−} is analogous to the orthovanadate ion.

At lower pH values, the monomer HVO_{4}^{2−} and dimer V_{2}O_{7}^{4−} are formed, with the monomer predominant at a vanadium concentration of less than c. 10^{−2}M (pV > 2, where pV is equal to the minus value of the logarithm of the total vanadium concentration/M). The formation of the divanadate ion is analogous to the formation of the dichromate ion. As the pH is reduced, further protonation and condensation to polyvanadates occur: at pH 4–6 H_{2}VO_{4}^{−} is predominant at pV greater than ca. 4, while at higher concentrations trimers and tetramers are formed. Between pH 2–4 decavanadate predominates, its formation from orthovanadate is represented by this condensation reaction:

10 VO_{4}^{3−} + 24 H^{+} → V_{10}O_{28}^{6−} + 12 H_{2}O

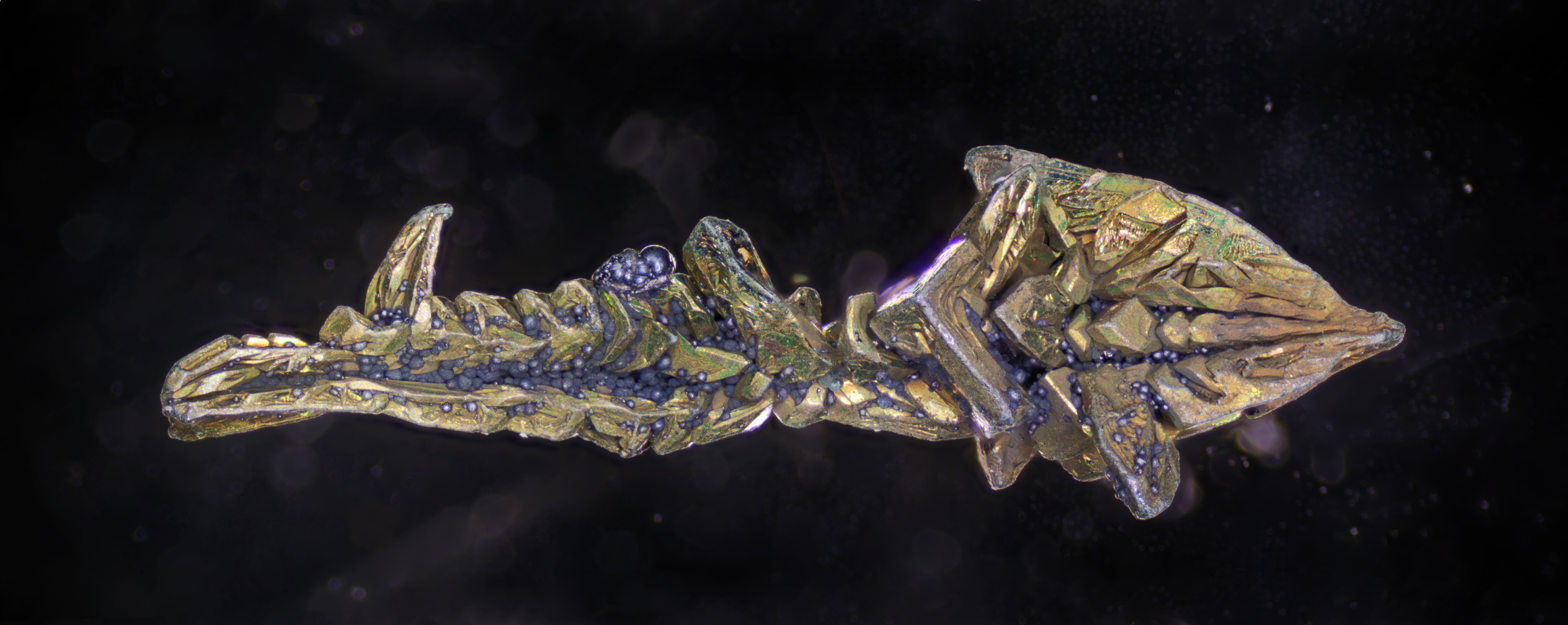
Vanadium crystal

In decavanadate, each V(V) center is surrounded by six oxide ligands. Vanadic acid, H_{3}VO_{4}, exists only at very low concentrations because protonation of the tetrahedral species H_{2}VO_{4}^{−} results in the preferential formation of the octahedral [VO_{2}(H_{2}O)_{4}]^{+} species. In strongly acidic solutions, pH < 2, [VO_{2}(H_{2}O)_{4}]^{+} is the predominant species, while the oxide V_{2}O_{5} precipitates from solution at high concentrations. The oxide is formally the acid anhydride of vanadic acid. The structures of many vanadate compounds have been determined by X-ray crystallography.

The Pourbaix diagram for vanadium in water, which shows the redox potentials between various vanadium species in different oxidation states

Vanadium(V) forms various peroxo complexes, most notably in the active site of the vanadium-containing bromoperoxidase enzymes. The species [VO(O_{2})(H_{2}O)_{4}]^{+} is stable in acidic solutions. In alkaline solutions, species with 2, 3 and 4 peroxide groups are known; the last forms violet salts with the formula M_{3}V(O_{2})_{4}·nH_{2}O (M= Li, Na, etc.), in which the vanadium has an 8-coordinate dodecahedral structure.

=== Halide derivatives ===
Twelve binary halides, compounds with the formula VX_{n} (n=2..5), are known. VI_{4}, VBr_{5}, and VI_{5} do not exist or are extremely unstable. In combination with other reagents, VCl_{4} is used as a catalyst for the polymerization of dienes. Like all binary halides, those of vanadium are Lewis acidic, especially those of V(IV) and V(V). Many of the halides form octahedral complexes with the formula VX_{n}L_{(6−n)} (X= halide; L= other ligand).

Many vanadium oxyhalides (formula VO_{m}X_{n)}) are known. The oxytrichloride and oxytrifluoride (VOCl_{3} and VOF_{3}) are the most widely studied. Akin to POCl_{3}, they are volatile, adopt tetrahedral structures in the gas phase, and are Lewis acidic.

=== Coordination compounds ===
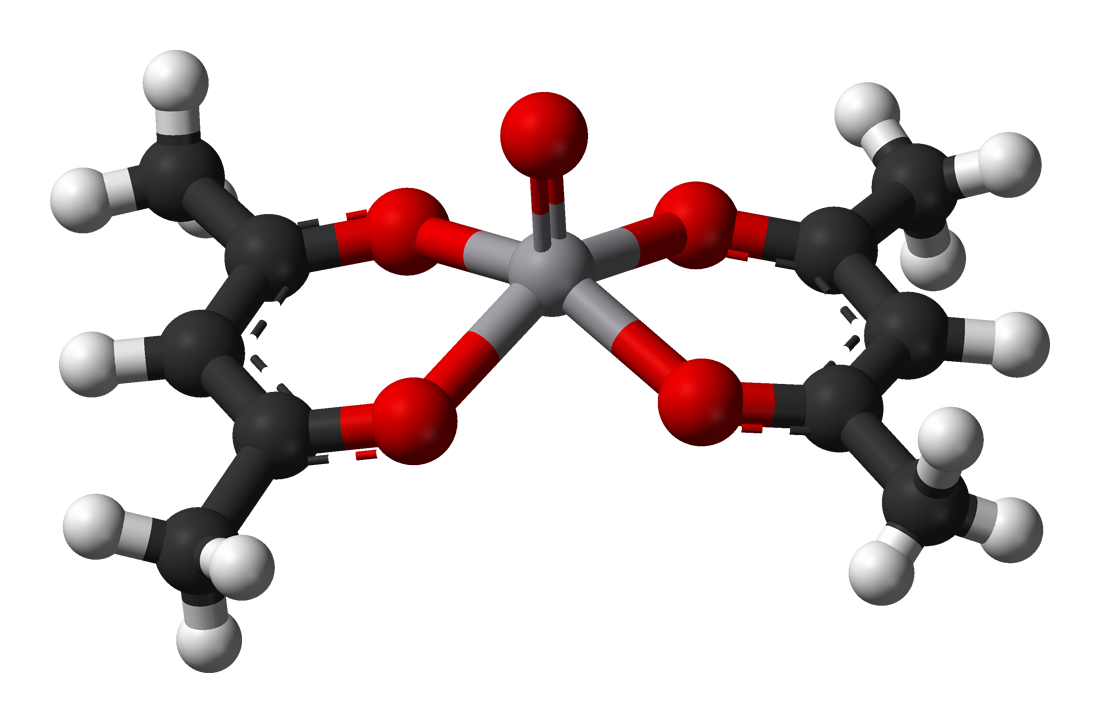
A ball-and-stick model of VO(O_{2}C_{5}H_{7})_{2}

Complexes of vanadium(II) and (III) are reducing, while those of V(IV) and V(V) are oxidants. The vanadium ion is rather large and some complexes achieve coordination numbers greater than 6, as is the case in [V(CN)_{7}]^{4−}. Oxovanadium(V) also forms 7 coordinate coordination complexes with tetradentate ligands and peroxides and these complexes are used for oxidative brominations and thioether oxidations. The coordination chemistry of V^{4+} is dominated by the vanadyl center, VO^{2+}, which binds four other ligands strongly and one weakly (the one trans to the vanadyl center). An example is vanadyl acetylacetonate (V(O)(O_{2}C_{5}H_{7})_{2}). In this complex, the vanadium is 5-coordinate, distorted square pyramidal, meaning that a sixth ligand, such as pyridine, may be attached, though the association constant of this process is small. Many 5-coordinate vanadyl complexes have a trigonal bipyramidal geometry, such as VOCl_{2}(NMe_{3})_{2}. The coordination chemistry of V^{5+} is dominated by the relatively stable dioxovanadium coordination complexes which are often formed by aerial oxidation of the vanadium(IV) precursors indicating the stability of the +5 oxidation state and ease of interconversion between the +4 and +5 states.

=== Organometallic compounds ===
The organometallic chemistry of vanadium is well–developed. Vanadocene dichloride is a versatile starting reagent and has applications in organic chemistry. Vanadium carbonyl, V(CO)_{6}, is a rare example of a paramagnetic metal carbonyl. Reduction yields [V(CO)_{6}]^{−} (isoelectronic with Cr(CO)_{6}), which may be further reduced with sodium in liquid ammonia to yield [V(CO)_{5}]^{3−} (isoelectronic with Fe(CO)_{5}).

== Occurrence ==
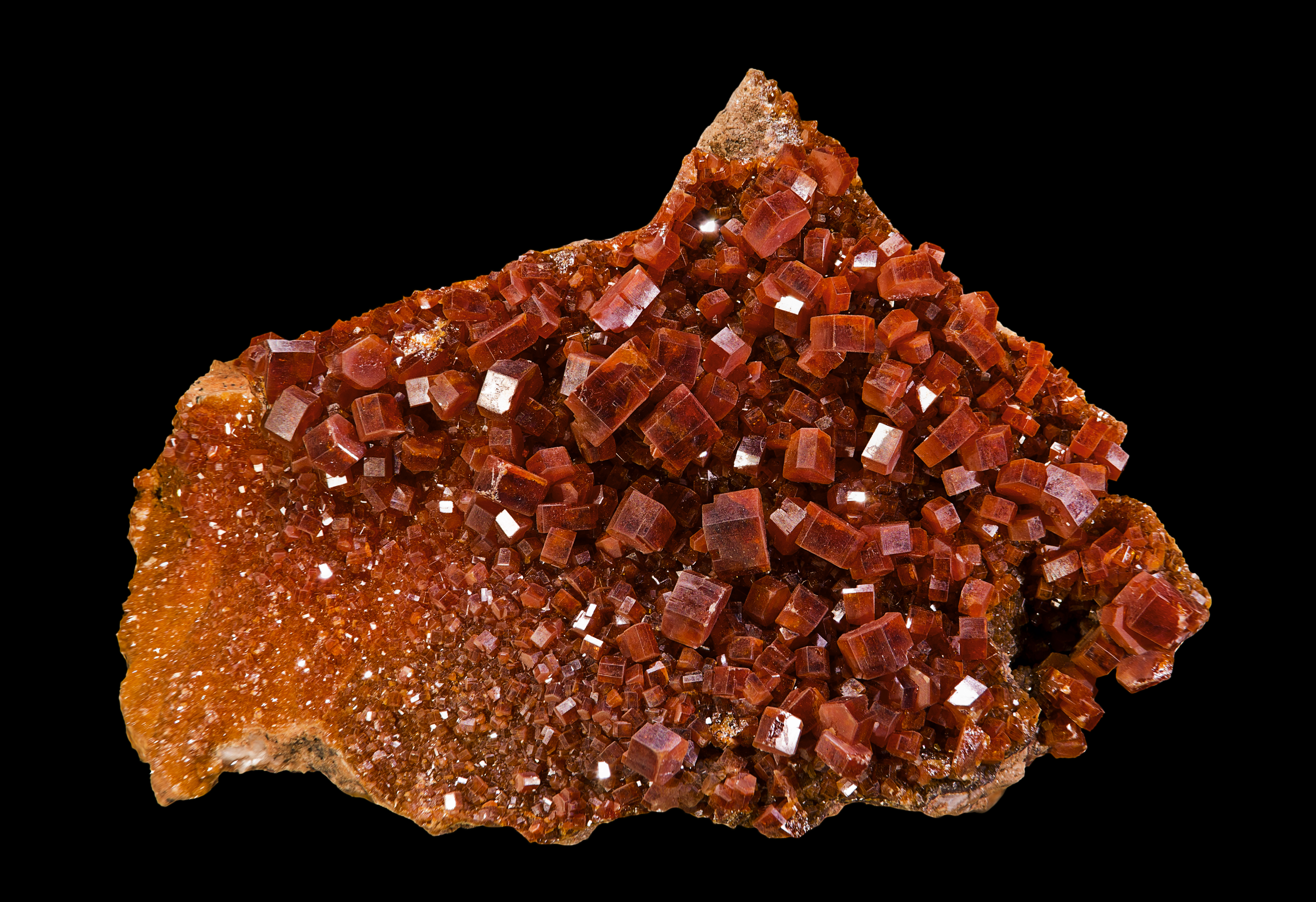
Vanadinite

Metallic vanadium is rare in nature (known as native vanadium), having been found among fumaroles of the Colima Volcano, but vanadium compounds occur naturally in about 65 different minerals.

Vanadium began to be used in the manufacture of special steels in 1896. At that time, very few deposits of vanadium ores were known. Between 1899 and 1906, the main deposits exploited were the mines of Santa Marta de los Barros (Badajoz), Spain. Vanadinite was extracted from these mines. At the beginning of the 20th century, a large deposit of vanadium ore was discovered near Junín, Cerro de Pasco, Peru (now the Minas Ragra vanadium mine). For several years this patrónite (VS_{4}) deposit was an economically significant source for vanadium ore. In 1920 roughly two-thirds of the worldwide production was supplied by the mine in Peru. With the production of uranium in the 1910s and 1920s from carnotite (K_{2}(UO_{2})_{2}(VO_{4})_{2}·3H_{2}O) vanadium became available as a side product of uranium production. Vanadinite (Pb_{5}(VO_{4})_{3}Cl) and other vanadium-bearing minerals are only mined in exceptional cases. With the rising demand, much of the world's vanadium production is now sourced from vanadium-bearing magnetite found in ultramafic gabbro bodies. If this titanomagnetite is used to produce iron, most of the vanadium goes to the slag and is extracted from it. About 10% of world vanadium production is by primary extraction from ore, and 90% recovered from leftover slag after manufacturing steel. The vanadium content in ore can be only 0.3%, so primary extraction creates large amounts of waste.

Vanadium is produced mostly in China, South Africa and eastern Russia. In 2022 these three countries produced more than 96% of the 100,000 tons of produced vanadium, with China providing 70% mostly as a byproduct of its steel industry.

Fumaroles of Colima are known of being vanadium-rich, depositing other vanadium minerals, that include shcherbinaite (V_{2}O_{5}) and colimaite (K_{3}VS_{4}).

Vanadium is also present in bauxite and deposits of crude oil, coal, oil shale, and tar sands. In crude oil, concentrations up to 1200 ppm have been reported. When such oil products are burned, traces of vanadium may cause corrosion in engines and boilers. An estimated 110,000 tons of vanadium per year are released into the atmosphere by burning fossil fuels. Black shales are also a potential source of vanadium. During WWII some vanadium was extracted from alum shales in the south of Sweden.

In the universe, the cosmic abundance of vanadium is 0.0001%, making the element nearly as common as copper or zinc. Vanadium is the 19th most abundant element in the crust. It is detected spectroscopically in light from the Sun and sometimes in the light from other stars. The vanadyl ion is also abundant in seawater, having an average concentration of 30 nM (1.5 mg/m^{3}). Some mineral water springs also contain the ion in high concentrations. For example, springs near Mount Fuji contain as much as 54 μg per liter.

== Production ==
Vanadium production

Vanadium is most commonly produced initially as vanadium pentoxide (V_{2}O_{5}), an intermediate compound that can subsequently be reduced to produce vanadium metal or ferrovanadium alloys. In 2024, global vanadium production reached approximately 135,000 metric tonnes, of which 59% was obtained through co-production or by-product recovery associated with steelmaking and other metallurgical processes, 24% from primary mining, and 17% from secondary recovery of industrial residues, including flue, fly ash and spent catalysts. Global production is geographically concentrated, with China, Russia, South Africa, and Brazil collectively accounting for over 90% of the global supply since the beginning of the 21st century.

Vanadium production trend

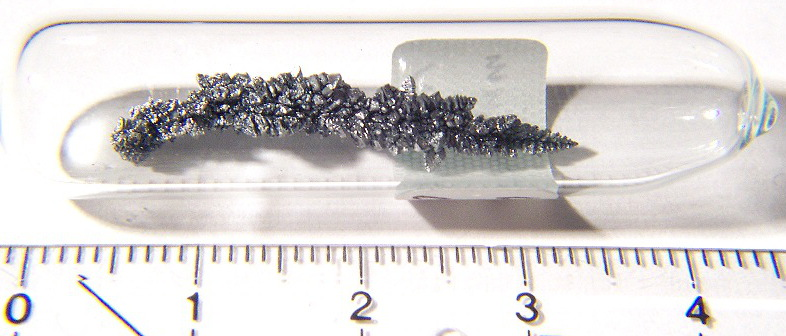
Vacuum sublimed vanadium dendritic crystals (99.9%)

Vanadium metal is obtained by a multistep process that begins with roasting crushed ore with NaCl or Na_{2}CO_{3} at about 850 °C to give sodium metavanadate (NaVO_{3}). An aqueous extract of this solid is acidified to produce "red cake", a polyvanadate salt, which is reduced with calcium metal. As an alternative for small-scale production, vanadium pentoxide is reduced with hydrogen or magnesium. Many other methods are also used, in all of which vanadium is produced as a byproduct of other processes. Purification of vanadium is possible by the crystal bar process developed by Anton Eduard van Arkel and Jan Hendrik de Boer in 1925. It involves the formation of the metal iodide, in this example vanadium(III) iodide, and the subsequent decomposition to yield pure metal:

2 V + 3 I_{2} ⇌ 2 VI_{3}

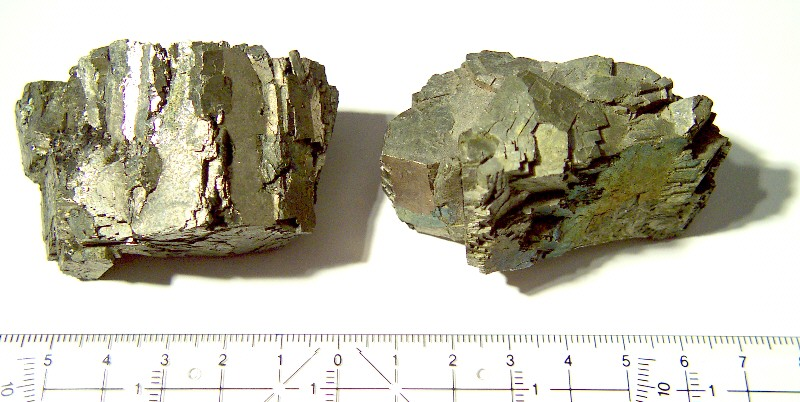
Ferrovanadium chunks

Most vanadium is used as a steel alloy called ferrovanadium. Ferrovanadium is produced directly by reducing a mixture of vanadium oxide, iron oxides and iron in an electric furnace. The vanadium ends up in pig iron produced from vanadium-bearing magnetite. Depending on the ore used, the slag contains up to 25% of vanadium.

== Applications ==
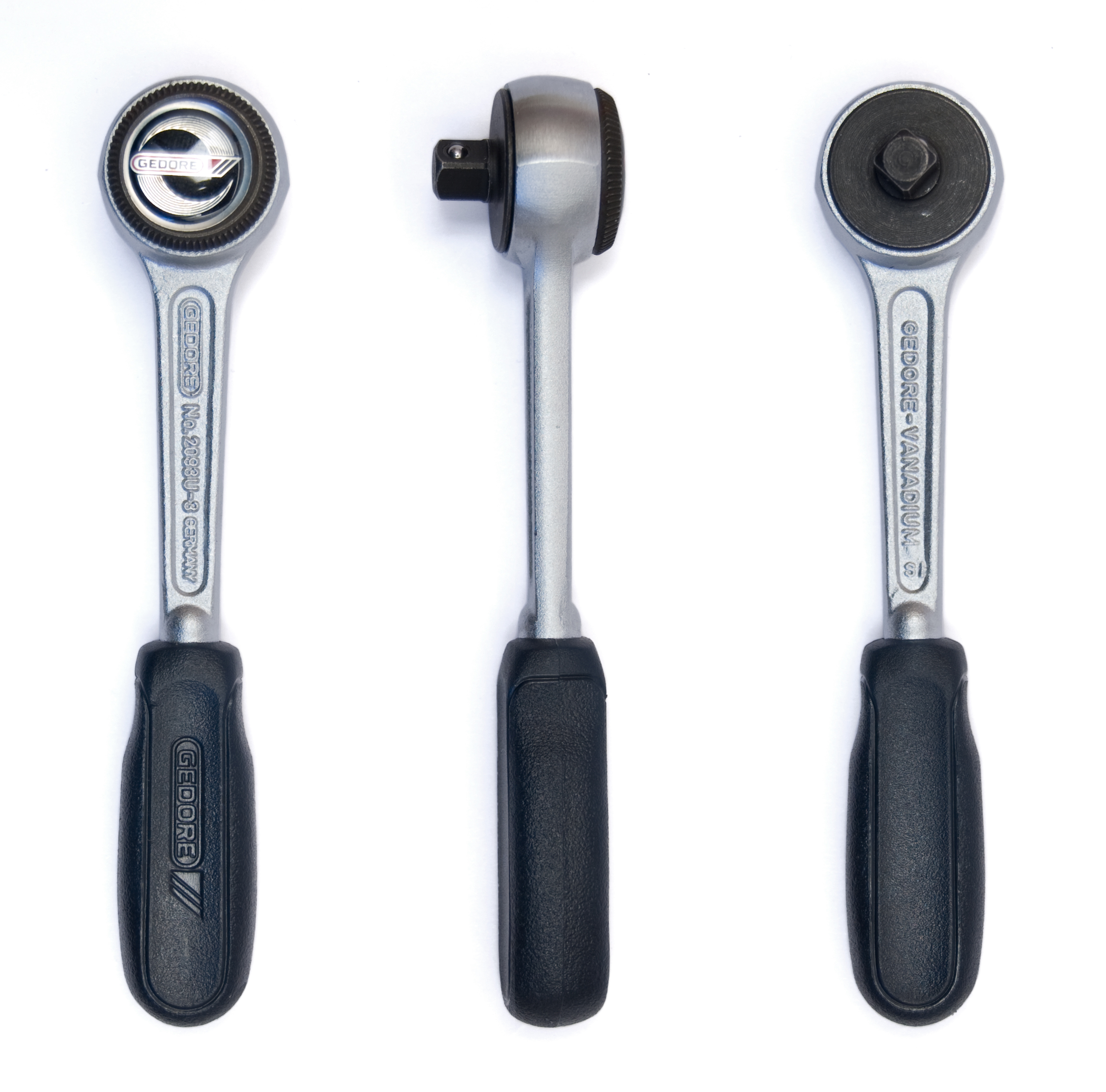
Tool made from vanadium steel

=== Alloys ===
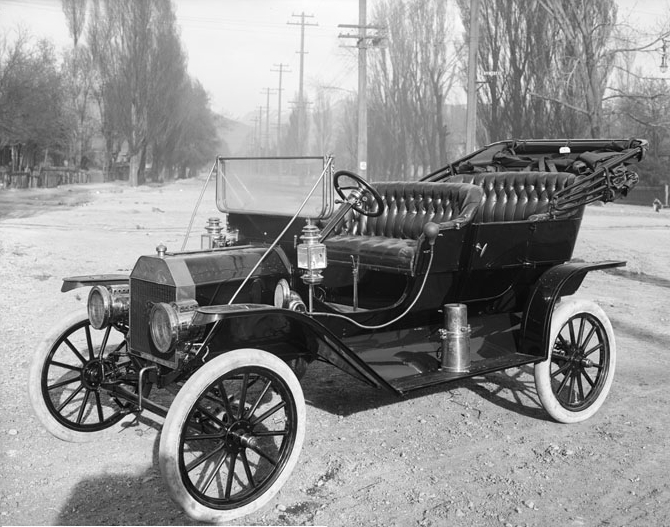
The Model T used vanadium steel in its chassis.

Approximately 85% of the vanadium produced is used as ferrovanadium or as a steel additive. The considerable increase of strength in steel containing small amounts of vanadium was discovered in the early 20th century. Vanadium forms stable nitrides and carbides, resulting in a significant increase in the strength of steel. From that time on, vanadium steel was used for applications in axles, bicycle frames, crankshafts, gears, and other critical components. There are two groups of vanadium steel alloys. Vanadium high-carbon steel alloys contain 0.15–0.25% vanadium, and high-speed tool steels (HSS) have a vanadium content of 1–5%. For high-speed tool steels, a hardness above HRC 60 can be achieved. HSS steel is used in surgical instruments and tools. Powder-metallurgic alloys contain up to 18% percent vanadium. The high content of vanadium carbides in those alloys increases wear resistance significantly. One application for those alloys is tools and knives.

Vanadium stabilizes the beta form of titanium and increases the strength and temperature stability of titanium. Mixed with aluminium in titanium alloys, it is used in jet engines, high-speed airframes and dental implants. The most common alloy for seamless tubing is Titanium 3/2.5 containing 2.5% vanadium, the titanium alloy of choice in the aerospace, defense, and bicycle industries. Another common alloy, primarily produced in sheets, is Titanium 6AL-4V, a titanium alloy with 6% aluminium and 4% vanadium.

Several vanadium alloys show superconducting behavior. The first A15 phase superconductor was a vanadium compound, V_{3}Si, which was discovered in 1952. Vanadium-gallium tape is used in superconducting magnets (17.5 teslas or 175,000 gauss). The structure of the superconducting A15 phase of V_{3}Ga is similar to that of the more common Nb_{3}Sn and Nb_{3}Ti.

It has been found that a small amount, 40 to 270 ppm, of vanadium in Wootz steel significantly improved the strength of the product, and gave it distinctive patterning. The source of the vanadium in the original Wootz steel ingots remains unknown.

Vanadium can be used as a substitute for molybdenum in armor steel, though the alloy produced is far more brittle and prone to spalling on non-penetrating impacts. Nazi Germany was one of the most prominent users of such alloys, in armored vehicles like Tiger II or Jagdtiger.

=== Catalysts ===
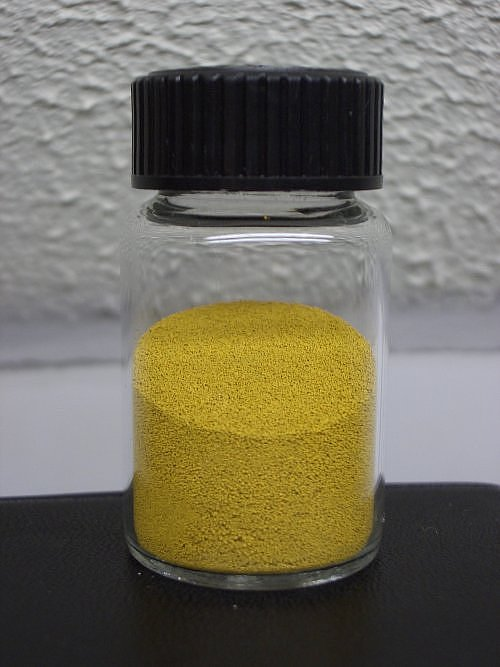
Vanadium(V) oxide is a catalyst in the contact process for producing sulfuric acid.

Vanadium compounds are used extensively as catalysts; Vanadium pentoxide V_{2}O_{5}, is used as a catalyst in manufacturing sulfuric acid by the contact process In this process sulfur dioxide (SO_{2}) is oxidized to the trioxide (SO_{3}): In this redox reaction, sulfur is oxidized from +4 to +6, and vanadium is reduced from +5 to +4:

V_{2}O_{5} + SO_{2} → 2 VO_{2} + SO_{3}

The catalyst is regenerated by oxidation with air:

4 VO_{2} + O_{2} → 2 V_{2}O_{5}

Similar oxidations are used in the production of maleic anhydride:

2 C_{4}H_{10} + 7 O_{2} → 2 C_{4}H_{2}O_{3} + 8 H_{2}O

Phthalic anhydride and several other bulk organic compounds are produced similarly. These green chemistry processes convert inexpensive feedstocks to highly functionalized, versatile intermediates.

Vanadium is an important component of mixed metal oxide catalysts used in the oxidation of propane and propylene to acrolein, acrylic acid or the ammoxidation of propylene to acrylonitrile.

=== Other uses ===
The vanadium redox battery, a type of flow battery, is an electrochemical cell consisting of aqueous vanadium ions in different oxidation states. Batteries of this type were first proposed in the 1930s and developed commercially from the 1980s onwards. Cells use +5 and +2 formal oxidization state ions. Vanadium redox batteries are used commercially for grid energy storage.

Vanadate can be used for protecting steel against rust and corrosion by conversion coating. Vanadium foil is used in cladding titanium to steel because it is compatible with both iron and titanium. The moderate thermal neutron-capture cross-section and the short half-life of the isotopes produced by neutron capture makes vanadium a suitable material for the inner structure of a fusion reactor.

Vanadium can be added in small quantities < 5% to LFP battery cathodes to increase ionic conductivity.

==== Proposed ====
Lithium vanadium oxide has been proposed for use as a high-energy-density anode for lithium-ion batteries, at 745 Wh/L when paired with a lithium cobalt oxide cathode. Vanadium phosphates have been proposed as the cathode in the lithium vanadium phosphate battery, another type of lithium-ion battery.

Sodium vanadium phosphate has also been proposed as an alternative to lithium-ion batteries. The new material is proposed by the Canepa Research Laboratory at the University of Houston, who claim that since sodium is around 50 times cheaper than lithium, a sodium-ion alternative with similar energy density could lead to cheaper batteries with a simpler resource chain.

== Biological role ==
Vanadium has a more significant role in marine environments than terrestrial ones.

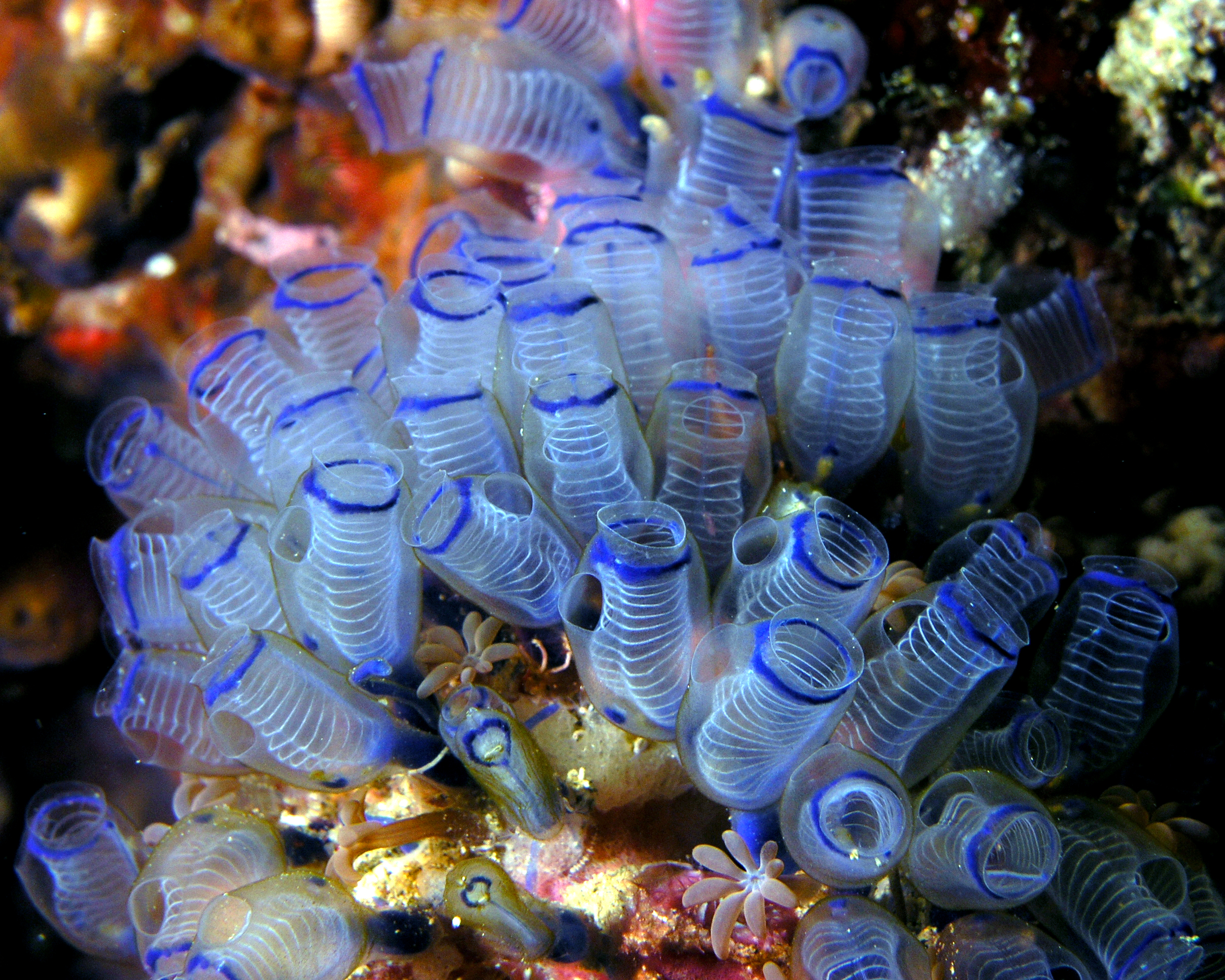
Tunicates such as this bluebell tunicate contain vanadium as vanabins.

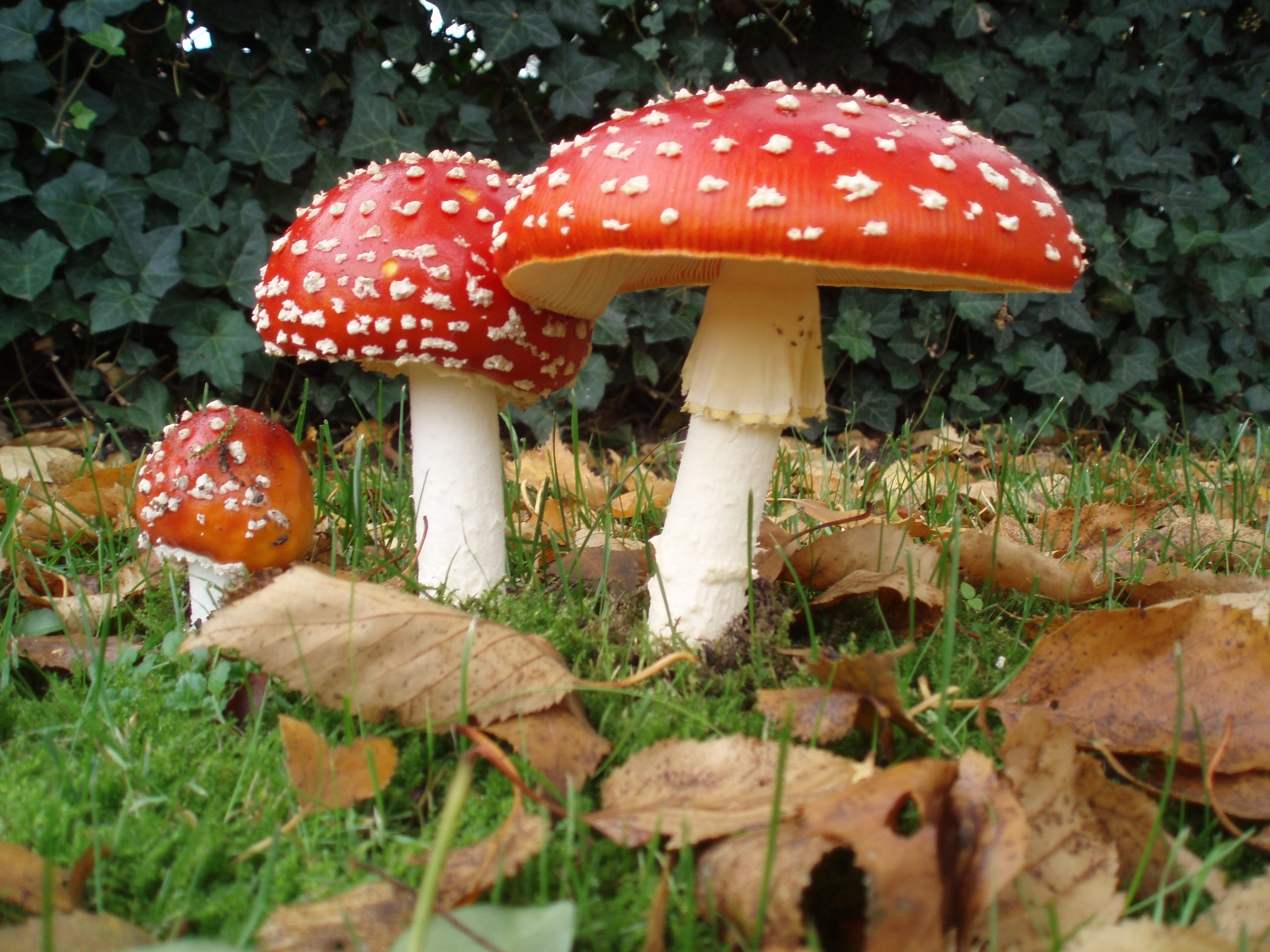
Amanita muscaria contains amavadin.

=== Vanadoenzymes ===
Several species of marine algae produce vanadium bromoperoxidase as well as the closely related chloroperoxidase (which may use a heme or vanadium cofactor) and iodoperoxidases. The bromoperoxidase produces an estimated 1–2 million tons of bromoform and 56,000 tons of bromomethane annually. Most naturally occurring organobromine compounds are produced by this enzyme, catalyzing the following reaction (R-H is hydrocarbon substrate):

R−H + Br^{−} + H_{2}O_{2} → R−Br + H_{2}O + OH^{−}

A vanadium nitrogenase is used by some nitrogen-fixing micro-organisms, such as Azotobacter. In this role, vanadium serves in place of the more common molybdenum or iron, and gives the nitrogenase slightly different properties.

=== Vanadium accumulation in tunicates ===
Vanadium is essential to tunicates, where it is stored in the highly acidified vacuoles of certain blood cell types, designated vanadocytes. Vanabins (vanadium-binding proteins) have been identified in the cytoplasm of such cells. The concentration of vanadium in the blood of ascidian tunicates is as much as ten million times higher than the surrounding seawater, which normally contains 1 to 2 μg/L. The function of this vanadium concentration system and these vanadium-bearing proteins is still unknown, but the vanadocytes are later deposited just under the outer surface of the tunic, where they may deter predation.

=== Fungi ===
Amanita muscaria and related species of macrofungi accumulate vanadium (up to 500 mg/kg in dry weight). Vanadium is present in the coordination complex amavadin in fungal fruit-bodies. The biological importance of the accumulation is unknown. Toxic or peroxidase enzyme functions have been suggested.

=== Mammals ===
Deficiencies in vanadium result in reduced growth in rats. The U.S. Institute of Medicine has not confirmed that vanadium is an essential nutrient for humans, so neither a Recommended Dietary Intake nor an Adequate Intake have been established. Dietary intake is estimated at 6 to 18 μg/day, with less than 5% absorbed. The Tolerable Upper Intake Level (UL) of dietary vanadium, beyond which adverse effects may occur, is set at 1.8 mg/day.

=== Research ===
Vanadyl sulfate as a dietary supplement has been researched as a means of increasing insulin sensitivity or otherwise improving glycemic control in people who are diabetic. Some of the trials had significant treatment effects but were deemed as being of poor study quality. The amounts of vanadium used in these trials (30 to 150 mg) far exceeded the safe upper limit. The conclusion of the systemic review was "There is no rigorous evidence that oral vanadium supplementation improves glycaemic control in type 2 diabetes. The routine use of vanadium for this purpose cannot be recommended."

In astrobiology, it has been suggested that discrete vanadium accumulations on Mars could be a potential microbial biosignature when used in conjunction with Raman spectroscopy and morphology.

== Safety ==
All vanadium compounds should be considered toxic. Tetravalent VOSO_{4} has been reported to be at least 5 times more toxic than trivalent V_{2}O_{3}. The US Occupational Safety and Health Administration (OSHA) has set an exposure limit of 0.05 mg/m^{3} for vanadium pentoxide dust and 0.1 mg/m^{3} for vanadium pentoxide fumes in workplace air for an 8-hour workday, 40-hour work week. The US National Institute for Occupational Safety and Health (NIOSH) has recommended that 35 mg/m^{3} of vanadium be considered immediately dangerous to life and health, that is, likely to cause permanent health problems or death. Vanadium has been identified as a carcinogenic component of PM2.5 pollution, explaining a proportion of cancers and death caused by it.

Vanadium compounds are poorly absorbed through the gastrointestinal system. Inhalation of vanadium and vanadium compounds results primarily in adverse effects on the respiratory system. Quantitative data are, however, insufficient to derive a subchronic or chronic inhalation reference dose. Other effects have been reported after oral or inhalation exposures on blood parameters, liver, neurological development, and other organs in rats.

There is little evidence that vanadium or vanadium compounds are reproductive toxins or teratogens. Vanadium pentoxide was reported to be carcinogenic in male rats and in male and female mice by inhalation in an NTP study, although the interpretation of the results has been disputed a few years after the report. The carcinogenicity of vanadium has not been determined by the United States Environmental Protection Agency.

Vanadium traces in diesel fuels are the main fuel component in high temperature corrosion. During combustion, vanadium oxidizes and reacts with sodium and sulfur, yielding vanadate compounds with melting points as low as 530 °C (986 °F), which attack the passivation layer on steel and render it susceptible to corrosion. The solid vanadium compounds also abrade engine components.

== See also ==
- Flow battery – Type of electrochemical cell
- Green Giant mine – Vanadium mine in Madagascar
- Grid energy storage – Large scale electricity supply management
- Vanadium carbide – Extremely hard refractory ceramic material
- Vanadium redox battery – Type of rechargeable flow battery
- Vanadium tetrachloride – Chemical reagent used to produce other vanadium compounds
- Vanadium(V) oxide – Precursor to vanadium alloys and industrial catalyst
- International Vanadium Symposium – Biennial interdisciplinary event
- Vanadium cycle – Exchange of vanadium between continental crust and seawater
