= Vanadium(V) oxide =

Precursor to vanadium alloys and industrial catalyst

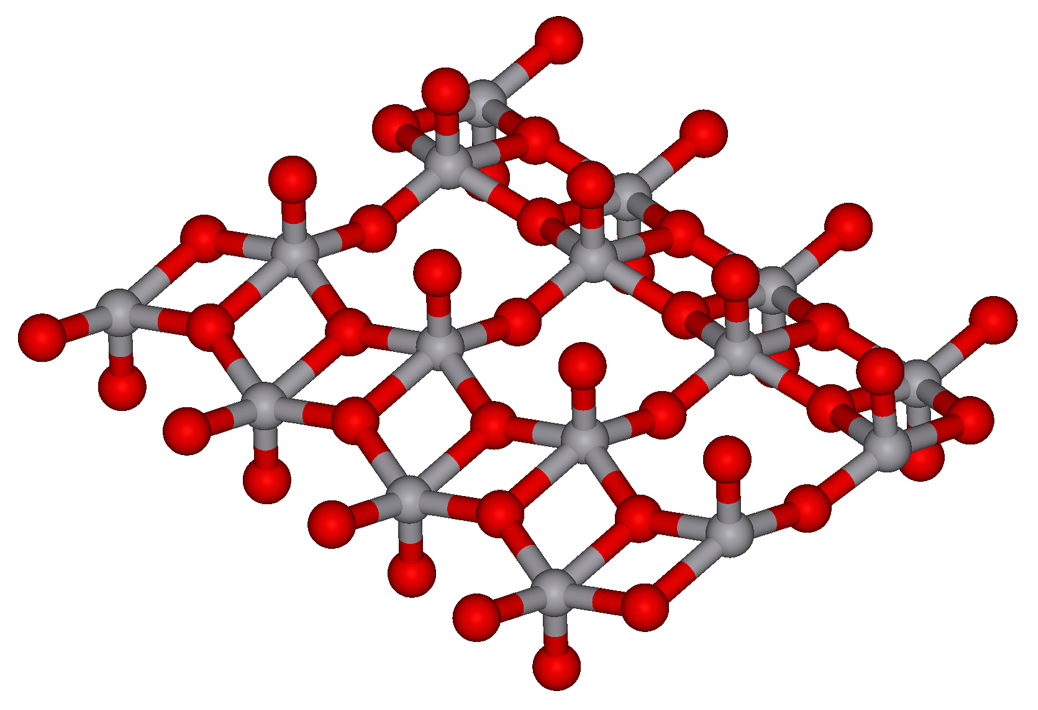
- Vanadium pentoxide monolayer

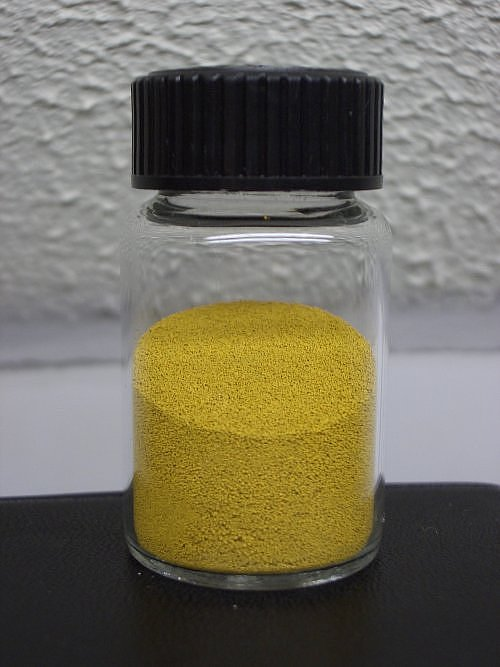
- Vanadium(V) oxide

Names
- IUPAC name Divanadium pentaoxide
- Other names Vanadium pentoxide Vanadic anhydride Divanadium pentoxide

Identifiers
CAS Number	1314-62-1
3D model (JSmol)	Interactive image
ChEBI	CHEBI:30045
ChemSpider	14130
ECHA InfoCard	100.013.855
EC Number	215-239-8
KEGG	C19308
PubChem CID	14814
RTECS number	YW2450000
UNII	BVG363OH7A
UN number	2862
CompTox Dashboard (EPA)	DTXSID2023806
- InChI: InChI=1S/5O.2V Key: GNTDGMZSJNCJKK-UHFFFAOYSA-N; InChI=1/5O.2V/rO5V2/c1-6(2)5-7(3)4 Key: GNTDGMZSJNCJKK-HHIHJEONAP
- SMILES: O=[V](=O)O[V](=O)=O

Properties
Chemical formula	V_{2}O_{5}
Molar mass	181.8800 g/mol
Appearance	Yellow solid
Density	3.35 g/cm^{3}
Melting point	681 °C (1,258 °F; 954 K)
Boiling point	1,750 °C (3,180 °F; 2,020 K) (decomposes)
Solubility in water	0.7 g/L (20 °C)
Magnetic susceptibility (χ)	+128.0×10^{−6} cm^{3}/mol

Structure
Crystal structure	Orthorhombic
Space group	Pmmn, No. 59
Lattice constant	a = 1151 pm, b = 355.9 pm, c = 437.1 pm
Coordination geometry	Distorted trigonal bipyramidal (V)

Thermochemistry
Heat capacity (C)	127.7 J/(mol·K)
Std molar entropy (S^{⦵}_{298})	131.0 J/(mol·K)
Std enthalpy of formation (Δ_{f}H^{⦵}_{298})	−1550.6 kJ/mol
Gibbs free energy (Δ_{f}G^{⦵})	−1419.5 kJ/mol

Hazards
- GHS labelling
Pictograms	
Signal word	Danger
Hazard statements	H302, H332, H335, H341, H361, H372, H411
NFPA 704 (fire diamond)	4 0 0
Flash point	Non-flammable
- Lethal dose or concentration (LD, LC)
LD_{50} (median dose)	10 mg/kg (rat, oral); 23 mg/kg (mouse, oral)
LC_{Lo} (lowest published)	500 mg/m^{3} (cat, 23 min); 70 mg/m^{3} (rat, 2 hr)
- NIOSH (US health exposure limits)
PEL (Permissible)	C 0.5 mg V_{2}O_{5}/m^{3} (resp) (solid) C 0.1 mg V_{2}O_{5}/m^{3} (fume)
Safety data sheet (SDS)	ICSC 0596

Related compounds
Other anions	Vanadium oxytrichloride
Other cations	Niobium(V) oxide Tantalum(V) oxide
Related vanadium oxides	Vanadium(II) oxide Vanadium(III) oxide Vanadium(IV) oxide
- Except where otherwise noted, data are given for materials in their standard state (at 25 °C [77 °F], 100 kPa). verify (what is ?) Infobox references

Vanadium(V) oxide (vanadia) is the inorganic compound with the formula V_{2}O_{5}. Commonly known as vanadium pentoxide, it is a dark yellow solid, although when freshly precipitated from aqueous solution, its colour is deep orange. Because of its high oxidation state, it is both an amphoteric oxide and an oxidizing agent. From the industrial perspective, it is the most important compound of vanadium, being the principal precursor to alloys of vanadium and is a widely used industrial catalyst.

The mineral form of this compound, shcherbinaite, is extremely rare, almost always found among fumaroles. A mineral trihydrate, V_{2}O_{5}·3H_{2}O, is also known under the name of navajoite.

== Chemical properties ==
=== Reduction to lower oxides ===
Upon heating a mixture of vanadium(V) oxide and vanadium(III) oxide, comproportionation occurs to give vanadium(IV) oxide, as a deep-blue solid:

V_{2}O_{5} + V_{2}O_{3} → 4 VO_{2}

The reduction can also be effected by oxalic acid, carbon monoxide, and sulfur dioxide. Further reduction using hydrogen or excess CO can lead to complex mixtures of oxides such as V_{4}O_{7} and V_{5}O_{9} before black V_{2}O_{3} is reached.

=== Acid-base reactions ===
V_{2}O_{5} is an amphoteric oxide, and unlike most transition metal oxides, it is slightly water soluble, giving a pale yellow, acidic solution. Thus V_{2}O_{5} reacts with strong non-reducing acids to form solutions containing the pale yellow salts containing dioxovanadium(V) centers:

V_{2}O_{5} + 2 HNO_{3} → 2 VO_{2}(NO_{3}) + H_{2}O

It also reacts with strong alkali to form polyoxovanadates, which have a complex structure that depends on pH. If excess aqueous sodium hydroxide is used, the product is a colourless salt, sodium orthovanadate, Na_{3}VO_{4}. If acid is slowly added to a solution of Na_{3}VO_{4}, the colour gradually deepens through orange to red before brown hydrated V_{2}O_{5} precipitates around pH 2. These solutions contain mainly the ions HVO_{4}^{2−} and V_{2}O_{7}^{4−} between pH 9 and pH 13, but below pH 9 more exotic species such as V_{4}O_{12}^{4−} and HV_{10}O_{28}^{5−} (decavanadate) predominate.

Upon treatment with thionyl chloride, it converts to the volatile liquid vanadium oxychloride, VOCl_{3}:

V_{2}O_{5} + 3 SOCl_{2} → 2 VOCl_{3} + 3 SO_{2}

=== Other redox reactions ===
Hydrochloric acid and hydrobromic acid are oxidised to the corresponding halogen, e.g.,

V_{2}O_{5} + 6 HCl + 7 H_{2}O → 2 [VO(H_{2}O)_{5}]^{2+} + 4 Cl^{−} + Cl_{2}

Vanadates or vanadyl compounds in acid solution are reduced by zinc amalgam through the colourful pathway:

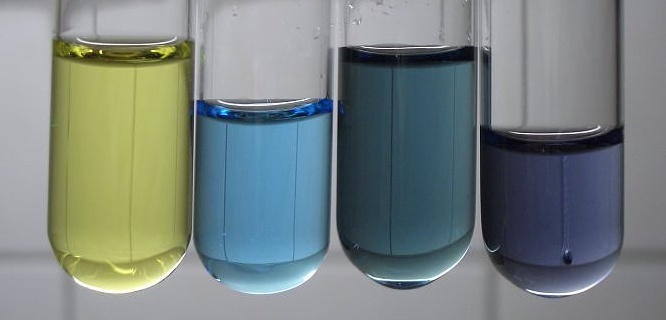
→ → →

The ions are all hydrated to varying degrees.

== Preparation ==
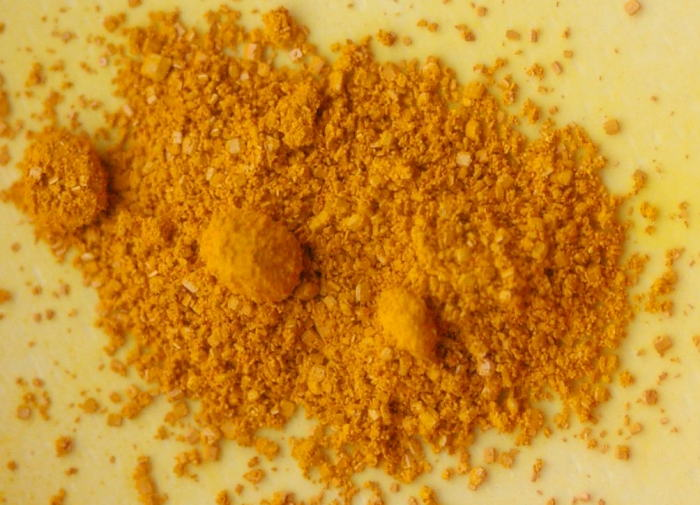
The orange, partly hydrated form of V_{2}O_{5}

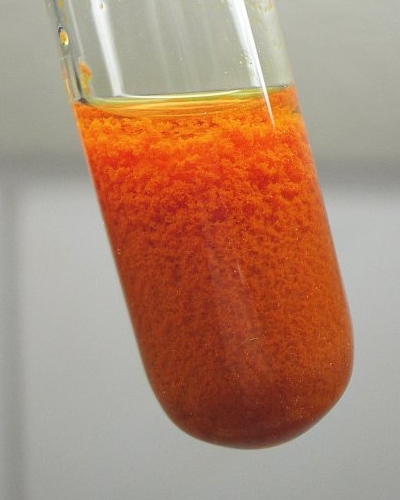
Precipitate of "red cake", which is hydrous V_{2}O_{5}

Technical grade V_{2}O_{5} is produced as a black powder used for the production of vanadium metal and ferrovanadium. A vanadium ore or vanadium-rich residue is treated with sodium carbonate and an ammonium salt to produce sodium metavanadate, NaVO_{3}. This material is then acidified to pH 2–3 using H_{2}SO_{4} to yield a precipitate of "red cake" (see above). The red cake is then melted at 690 °C to produce the crude V_{2}O_{5}.

Vanadium(V) oxide is produced when vanadium metal is heated with excess oxygen, but this product is contaminated with other, lower oxides. A more satisfactory laboratory preparation involves the decomposition of ammonium metavanadate at 500–550 °C:

2 NH_{4}VO_{3} → V_{2}O_{5} + 2 NH_{3} + H_{2}O

== Uses ==
=== Ferrovanadium production ===
In terms of quantity, the dominant use for vanadium(V) oxide is in the production of ferrovanadium (see above). The oxide is heated with scrap iron and ferrosilicon, with lime added to form a calcium silicate slag. Aluminium may also be used, producing the iron-vanadium alloy along with alumina as a byproduct.

=== Sulfuric acid production ===
Proposed mechanism for the oxidation of sulfur dioxide over vanadium oxide catalysts

Vanadium(V) oxide is used as the oxygen-transfer catalyst in the contact process, the only process now used for the industrial production of sulfuric acid. The catalyst phase is a molten salt formed from vanadium(V) oxide and added alkali metal sulfates acting as co-catalysts. In this melt, the reactive complex [(VO)_{2}O(SO_{_{4}})_{4}]^{4−}, which is regarded as the actual catalytic species, is formed. Oxygen and sulfur dioxide coordinate to this complex and react to form sulfur trioxide without a change in the oxidation state of vanadium.

The overall reaction is:
2 SO_{2} + O_{2} ⇌ 2 SO_{3}

The reaction is carried out at about 420 to 620 °C; at lower temperatures the catalyst is deactivated by formation of vanadium(IV) compounds, while at higher temperatures it begins to decompose. Industrial conversion is performed in multi-bed contact furnaces, in which the catalyst is arranged in four superposed layers and the process gas is cooled between the beds to maintain the required temperature range.

=== Other oxidations ===
Proposed early steps in the vanadium-catalyzed oxidation of naphthalene to phthalic anhydride, with V_{2}O_{5} represented as a molecule vs its true extended structure

Maleic anhydride is produced by the V_{2}O_{5}-catalysed oxidation of butane with air:

C_{4}H_{10} + 4 O_{2} → C_{2}H_{2}(CO)_{2}O + 8 H_{2}O

Maleic anhydride is used for the production of polyester resins and alkyd resins.

Phthalic anhydride is produced similarly by V_{2}O_{5}-catalysed oxidation of ortho-xylene or naphthalene at 350–400 °C. The equation for the vanadium oxide-catalysed oxidation of o-xylene to phthalic anhydride:

C_{6}H_{4}(CH_{3})_{2} + 3 O_{2} → C_{6}H_{4}(CO)_{2}O + 3 H_{2}O

The equation for the vanadium oxide-catalysed oxidation of naphthalene to phthalic anhydride:

2 C_{10}H_{8} + 9 O_{2} → 2 C_{6}H_{4}(CO)_{2}O + 4 CO_{2} + 4 H_{2}O

Phthalic anhydride is a precursor to plasticisers, used for conferring pliability to polymers.

A variety of other industrial compounds are produced similarly, including adipic acid, acrylic acid, oxalic acid, and anthraquinone.

=== Other applications ===
Due to its high coefficient of thermal resistance, vanadium(V) oxide finds use as a detector material in bolometers and microbolometer arrays for thermal imaging. It also finds application as an ethanol sensor in ppm levels (up to 0.1 ppm).

Vanadium redox batteries are a type of flow battery used for energy storage, including large power facilities such as wind farms. Vanadium oxide is also used as a cathode in lithium-ion batteries.

Vanadium pentoxide is often used as a component in glazes where it produces a wide range of colours from greens and yellows to blues and grays.

== Biological activity ==
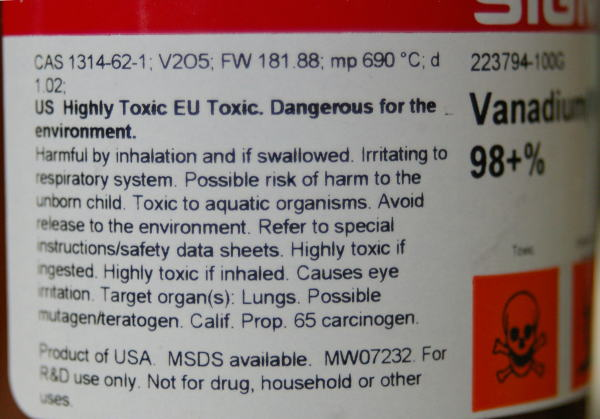

Vanadium(V) oxide exhibits very modest acute toxicity to humans, with an LD_{50} of about 470 mg/kg. The greater hazard is with inhalation of the dust, where the LD_{50} ranges from 4–11 mg/kg for a 14-day exposure. Vanadate (VO_{4}^{3−}), formed by hydrolysis of V_{2}O_{5} at high pH, appears to inhibit enzymes that process phosphate (PO_{4}^{3−}). However the mode of action remains elusive.

== Cited sources ==
- Brauer, G. (1963). "Vanadium, Niobium, Tantalum". In Brauer, G. (ed.). Handbook of Preparative Inorganic Chemistry, 2nd Ed. NY: Academic Press.
- Haynes, William M., ed. (2016). CRC Handbook of Chemistry and Physics (97th ed.). CRC Press. ISBN 978-1-4987-5429-3.
