= Vanadium-51 nuclear magnetic resonance =

Vanadium-51 nuclear magnetic resonance (^{51}V NMR spectroscopy) is a method for the characterization of vanadium-containing compounds and materials. ^{51}V comprises 99.75% of natural vanadium. The nucleus is quadrupolar with I = 7/2, which is not favorable for NMR spectroscopy, though its quadrupole moment and thus the linewidths are unusually small, while its magnetogyric ratio is relatively high (+7.0492 rad T^{−1}s^{−1}), so that ^{51}V has 38% receptivity vs ^{1}H. Its resonance frequency is close to that of ^{13}C (gyromagnetic ratio = 6.728284 rad T^{−1}s^{−1}).

The chemical shift dispersion is great, as illustrated by this series: 0 for VOCl_{3} (chemical shift standard), −309 for VOCl_{2}(O-i-Pr), −506 VOCl(O-i-Pr)_{2}, and −629 VO(O-i-Pr)_{3}. For vanadates, the parent orthovanadate and its conjugate acid absorb at −541 ([VO_{4}]^{3-}) and 534 ([HVO_{4}]^{2-}). For decavanadate, three shifts are observed in accord with the number of nonequivalent sites: −422, −502, −519.
