= Vanadate =

Coordination complex of vanadium

Structure of the orthovanadate anion

In chemistry, a vanadate is an anionic coordination complex of vanadium. Often vanadate refers to oxoanions of vanadium, most of which exist in its highest oxidation state of +5. The complexes [V(CN)_{6}]^{3−} and [V_{2}Cl_{9}]^{3−} are referred to as hexacyanovanadate(III) and nonachlorodivanadate(III), respectively.

A simple vanadate ion is the tetrahedral orthovanadate anion, VO^{3−}_{4} (which is also called vanadate(V)), which is present in e.g. sodium orthovanadate and in solutions of V_{2}O_{5} in strong base (pH > 13). Conventionally this ion is represented with a single double bond, however this is a resonance form as the ion is a regular tetrahedron with four equivalent oxygen atoms.

Additionally a range of polyoxovanadate ions exist which include discrete ions and "infinite" polymeric ions. There are also vanadates, such as rhodium vanadate, RhVO_{4}, which has a statistical rutile structure where the Rh^{3+} and V^{5+} ions randomly occupy the Ti^{4+} positions in the rutile lattice, that do not contain a lattice of cations and balancing vanadate anions but are mixed oxides.

In chemical nomenclature when vanadate forms part of the name, it indicates that the compound contains an anion with a central vanadium atom, e.g. ammonium hexafluorovanadate is a common name for the compound (NH_{4})_{3}VF_{6} with the IUPAC name of ammonium hexafluoridovanadate(III).

== Examples of oxovanadate ions ==
Some examples of discrete ions are

- VO_{4}^{3−} "orthovanadate", tetrahedral.
- V_{2}O_{7}^{4−} "pyrovanadate", corner-shared VO_{4} tetrahedra, similar to the dichromate ion
- V_{3}O_{9}^{3−}, cyclic with corner-shared VO_{4} tetrahedra
- V_{4}O_{12}^{4−}, cyclic with corner-shared VO_{4} tetrahedra
- V_{5}O_{14}^{3−}, corner shared VO_{4} tetrahedra
- V_{6}O_{18}^{6−}, ring.
- V_{10}O_{28}^{6−} "decavanadate", edge- and corner-shared VO_{6} octahedra
- V_{12}O_{32}^{4−}
- V_{13}O_{34}^{3−}, fused VO_{6} octahedra
- V_{18}O_{42}^{12−}

Some examples of polymeric "infinite" ions are

- [VO_{3}]_{n}^{n−} in e.g. NaVO_{3}, sodium metavanadate
- [V_{3}O_{8}]_{n}^{n−} in CaV_{6}O_{16}

metavanadate chains	V_{5}O_{14}	decavanadate ion

In these ions vanadium exhibits tetrahedral, square pyramidal and octahedral coordination. In this respect vanadium shows similarities to tungstate and molybdate, whereas chromium however has a more limited range of ions.

== Aqueous solutions ==
Dissolution of vanadium pentoxide in strongly basic aqueous solution gives the colourless VO^{3−}_{4} ion. On acidification, this solution's colour gradually darkens through orange to red at around pH 7. Brown hydrated V_{2}O_{5} precipitates around pH 2, redissolving to form a light yellow solution containing the [VO_{2}(H_{2}O)_{4}]^{+} ion. The number and identity of the oxyanions that exist between pH 13 and 2 depend on pH as well as concentration. For example, protonation of vanadate initiates a series of condensations to produce polyoxovanadate ions:

- pH 9–12: HVO_{4}^{2−}, V_{2}O_{7}^{4−}
- pH 4–9: H_{2}VO_{4}^{−}, V_{4}O_{12}^{4−}, HV_{10}O_{28}^{5−}
- pH 2–4: H_{3}VO_{4}, H_{2}V_{10}O_{28}^{4−}

== Pharmacological properties ==
Vanadate is a potent inhibitor of certain plasma membrane ATPases, such as Na^{+}/K^{+}-ATPase and Ca^{2+}-ATPase (PMCA). Acting as a transition-state analog of phosphate, vanadate undergoes nucleophillic attack by water during phosphoryl transfer, essentially "trapping" P-type ATPases in their phosphorylated E2 state. It also inhibits skeletal muscle actomyosin MgATPase activity and calcium activated force generation by actomyosin in the intact skeletal muscle contractile apparatus. However, it does not inhibit other ATPases, such as SERCA (sarco/endoplasmic reticulum Ca^{2+}-ATPase) or mitochondrial ATPase.
