= Sodium orthovanadate =

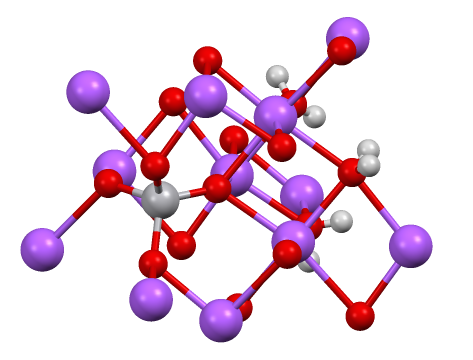

Names
- IUPAC name Sodium vanadate(V)
- Other names Sodium vanadium oxide

Identifiers
CAS Number	13721-39-6 (anhydrous)
3D model (JSmol)	Interactive image; dihydrate: Interactive image
Beilstein Reference	12153548
ChEBI	CHEBI:35607
ChEMBL	ChEMBL179166
ChemSpider	55575
ECHA InfoCard	100.033.883
Gmelin Reference	38128
PubChem CID	61671
RTECS number	YW1120000
UNII	7845MV6C8V
CompTox Dashboard (EPA)	DTXSID2037269
- InChI: InChI=1S/3Na.4O.V/q3*+1;;3*-1; Key: IHIXIJGXTJIKRB-UHFFFAOYSA-N; dihydrate: InChI=1S/3Na.2H2O.4O.V/h;;;2*1H2;;;;;/q3*+1;;;;3*-1; Key: SCZLKQJGLSYFKI-UHFFFAOYSA-N
- SMILES: [O-][V](=O)([O-])[O-].[Na+].[Na+].[Na+]; dihydrate: O.O.[O-][V](=O)([O-])[O-].[Na+].[Na+].[Na+]

Properties
Chemical formula	Na_{3}VO_{4}
Molar mass	183.908 g/mol
Appearance	white powder
Density	2.16 g/cm^{3}, solid
Melting point	858 °C (1,576 °F; 1,131 K)
Solubility in water	22.17 g/100 mL
Solubility	insoluble in ethanol

Structure
Crystal structure	cubic

Thermochemistry
Heat capacity (C)	164.8 J/mol K
Std molar entropy (S^{⦵}_{298})	190 J/mol K
Std enthalpy of formation (Δ_{f}H^{⦵}_{298})	−1757 kJ/mol

Hazards
- GHS labelling
Pictograms	(GHS07: Exclamation mark)
Signal word	Warning
Hazard statements	H302, H312, H332
Precautionary statements	P261, P264, P270, P271, P280, P301+P317, P302+P352, P304+P340, P317, P321, P330, P362+P364, P501
NFPA 704 (fire diamond)	3 0 0
Flash point	Non-flammable
- Lethal dose or concentration (LD, LC)
LD_{50} (median dose)	330 mg/kg (oral, rat)

Related compounds
Related compounds	Sodium metavanadate; Sodium decavanadate
- Except where otherwise noted, data are given for materials in their standard state (at 25 °C [77 °F], 100 kPa). verify (what is ?) Infobox references

Sodium orthovanadate is the inorganic compound with the chemical formula Na_{3}VO_{4}. It forms a dihydrate Na_{3}VO_{4}·2H_{2}O. Sodium orthovanadate is a salt of the VO_{4}^{3−} oxyanion. It is a colorless, water-soluble solid.

== Synthesis and structure ==
Sodium orthovanadate is produced by dissolving vanadium(V) oxide in a solution of sodium hydroxide:

V_{2}O_{5} + 6 NaOH → 2 Na_{3}VO_{4} + 3 H_{2}O

The salt features tetrahedral VO_{4}^{3−} anion centers linked to octahedral Na^{+} cation sites.

== Condensation equilibria ==
Like many oxometalates, orthovanadate is subject to a number of reactions, which have been analyzed by ^{51}V NMR studies. At high pH, VO_{4}^{3−} ions exist in equilibrium with HVO_{4}^{2−}. At lower pH's, condensation ensues to give various polyoxovanadates. Ultimately, decavanadate is formed.

== Biochemistry ==
Vanadates exhibit a variety of biological activities, in part because they serve as structural mimics of phosphates. It acts as a competitive inhibitor of ATPases, alkaline and acid phosphatases, and protein-phosphotyrosine phosphatases, and its inhibitory effects can be reversed by dilution or the addition of ethylenediaminetetraacetic acid (EDTA).

Orthovanadate is activated by boiling and adjusting pH to ~10; this depolymerizes decavanadate into the active inhibitor, monovanadate.
