= Sodium metavanadate =

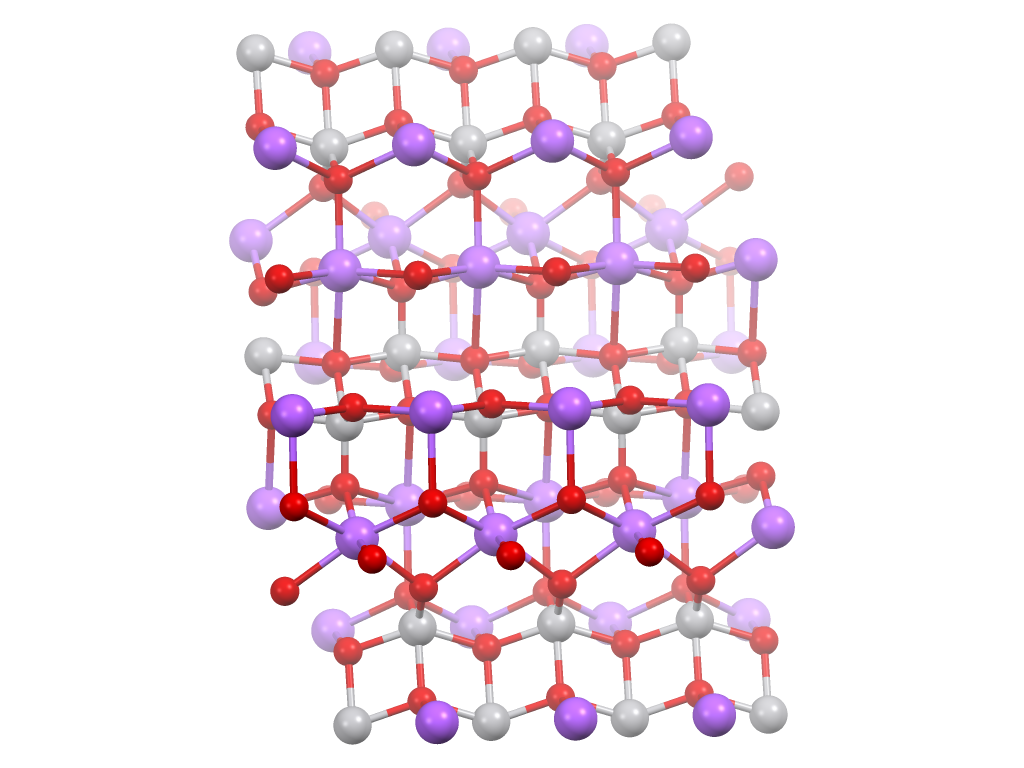

Names
- IUPAC name Sodium trioxovanadate(V)

Identifiers
| CAS Number | 13718-26-8 |
| 3D model (JSmol) | Interactive image |
| ChEBI | CHEBI:75221 |
| ChemSpider | 24427 |
| DrugBank | DB14702 |
| ECHA InfoCard | 100.033.869 |
| EC Number | 237-272-7 |
| PubChem CID | 4148882 |
| RTECS number | YW1050000 |
| UNII | 252S9L5606 |
| UN number | 3285 (SODIUM VANADATE) |
| CompTox Dashboard (EPA) | DTXSID3044336 |
- InChI: Key: CMZUMMUJMWNLFH-UHFFFAOYSA-N; InChI=1S/Na.3O.V/q+1;;;-1;
- SMILES: [O-][V](=O)=O.[Na+]

Properties
| Chemical formula | NaVO_{3} |
| Molar mass | 121.9295 g/mol |
| Appearance | yellow crystalline solid |
| Density | 2.84g/cm^{3} |
| Melting point | 630 °C (1,166 °F; 903 K) |
| Solubility in water | 19.3 g/100 mL (20 °C); 40.8 g/100 mL (80 °C) |

Thermochemistry
| Heat capacity (C) | 97.6 J/mol K |
| Std molar entropy (S^{⦵}_{298}) | 113.8 J/mol K |
| Std enthalpy of formation (Δ_{f}H^{⦵}_{298}) | −1148 kJ/mol |

Hazards
- Occupational safety and health (OHS/OSH)
| Main hazards | Toxic, irritant |
- GHS labelling
| Pictograms | (GHS06: Toxic) (GHS07: Exclamation mark) (GHS08: Health hazard) (GHS09: Environmental hazard) |
| Signal word | Danger |
| Hazard statements | H301, H315, H319, H332, H335, H361, H361d, H372, H411 |
| Precautionary statements | P203, P260, P264, P264+P265, P270, P271, P273, P280, P301+P316, P302+P352, P304+P340, P305+P351+P338, P317, P318, P319, P321, P330, P332+P317, P337+P317, P362+P364, P391, P403+P233, P405, P501 |
| NFPA 704 (fire diamond) | 2 0 0 |
| Flash point | Non-flammable |
- Lethal dose or concentration (LD, LC)
| LD_{50} (median dose) | 98 mg/kg (rat, oral) |

Related compounds
| Other anions | Sodium orthovanadate; Sodium decavanadate |
| Other cations | Ammonium metavanadate |
- Except where otherwise noted, data are given for materials in their standard state (at 25 °C [77 °F], 100 kPa). verify (what is ?) Infobox references

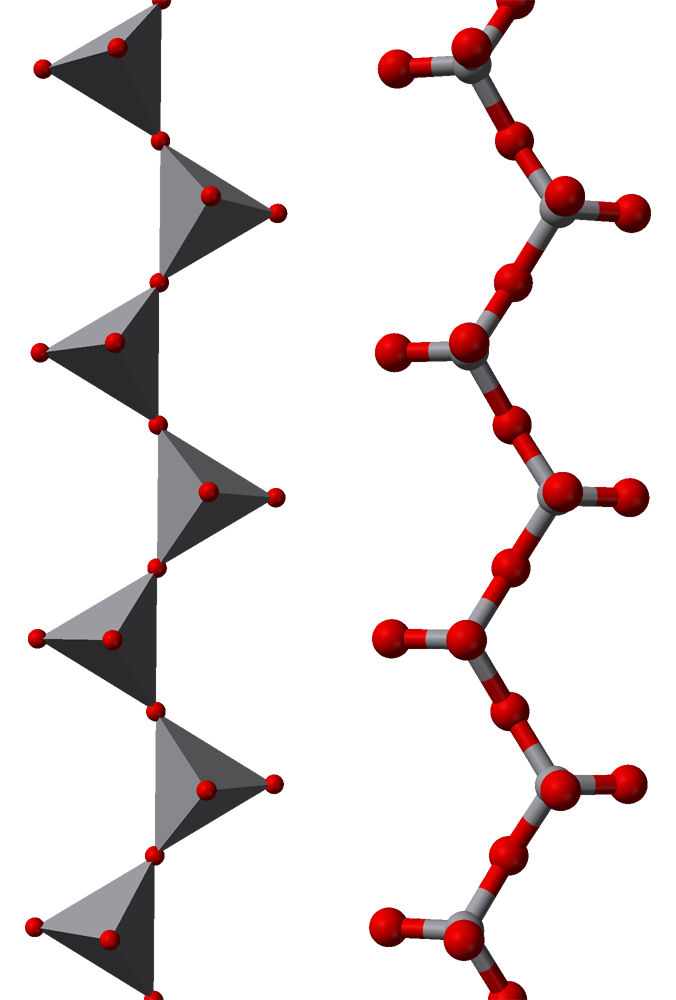
Chain of tetrahedral vanadate [VO_{4}]^{−} units, each sharing two corners

Sodium metavanadate is the inorganic compound with the formula NaVO_{3}. It is a yellow, water-soluble salt.

Sodium metavanadate is a common precursor to other vanadates. At low pH it converts to sodium decavanadate. It is also precursor to exotic metalates such as [γ-PV_{2}W_{10}O_{40}]^{5-}, [α-PVW_{11}O_{40}]^{4-}, and [β-PV_{2}W_{10}O_{40}]^{5-}.

== Minerals ==
Sodium metavanadate occurs as two minor minerals, metamunirite (anhydrous) and a dihydrate, munirite. Both are very rare, metamunirite is now known only from vanadium- and uranium-bearing sandstone formations of central-western USA and munirite from Pakistan and South Africa.
