= Sodium decavanadate =

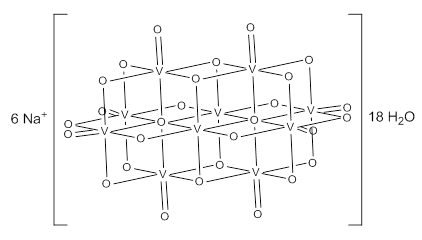

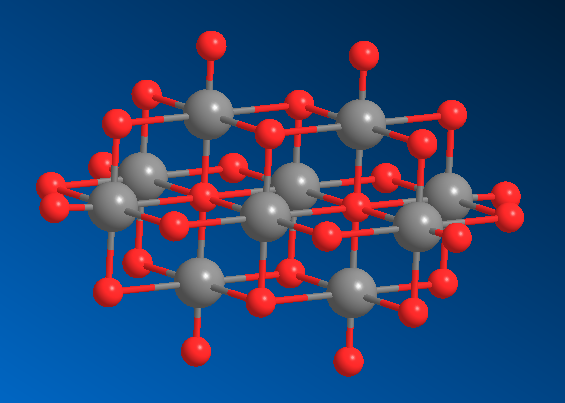

Identifiers
CAS Number	(anhydrous): 12315-57-0
3D model (JSmol)	(anhydrous): Interactive image
ChemSpider	(anhydrous): 34997594
EC Number	(anhydrous): 235-375-1
PubChem CID	(anhydrous): 118856830
- InChI: InChI=1S/6Na.28O.10V/q6*+1;28*-2;10*+5 Key: WSNCYQDYQWKFLZ-UHFFFAOYSA-N
- SMILES: (anhydrous): [O-2].[O-2].[O-2].[O-2].[O-2].[O-2].[O-2].[O-2].[O-2].[O-2].[O-2].[O-2].[O-2].[O-2].[O-2].[O-2].[O-2].[O-2].[O-2].[O-2].[O-2].[O-2].[O-2].[O-2].[O-2].[O-2].[O-2].[O-2].[Na+].[Na+].[Na+].[Na+].[Na+].[Na+].[V].[V].[V].[V].[V].[V].[V].[V].[V].[V]

Properties
Chemical formula	Na_{6}[V_{10}O_{28}]
Molar mass	1419.6 g/mol
Appearance	orange solid

Related compounds
Other anions	Sodium orthovanadate; Sodium metavanadate
- Except where otherwise noted, data are given for materials in their standard state (at 25 °C [77 °F], 100 kPa). (what is ?) Infobox references

Sodium decavanadate describes any member of the family of inorganic compounds with the formula Na_{6}[V_{10}O_{28}]·nH_{2}O. These are sodium salts of the orange-colored decavanadate anion [V_{10}O_{28}]^{6−}. Numerous other decavanadate salts have been isolated and studied since 1956 when it was first characterized.

== Acid-base properties ==
Aqueous vanadate (V) compounds undergo various self-condensation reactions. Depending on pH, major vanadate anions in solution include VO_{2}(H_{2}O)^{+}_{4}, VO^{3−}_{4}, V_{2}O^{3−}_{7}, V_{3}O^{3−}_{9}, V_{4}O^{4−}_{12}, and V_{10}O^{6−}_{28}. The anions often reversibly protonate. Decavanadate forms according to this equilibrium:

H_{3}V_{10}O^{3−}_{28} ⇌ H_{2}V_{10}O^{4−}_{28} + H^{+}
H_{2}V_{10}O^{4−}_{28} ⇌ HV_{10}O^{5−}_{28} + H^{+}
HV_{10}O^{5−}_{28}_{(aq)} ⇌ V_{10}O^{6−}_{28} + H^{+}

The structure of the various protonation states of the decavanadate ion has been examined by ^{51}V NMR spectroscopy. Each species gives three signals; with slightly varying chemical shifts around −425, −506, and −523 ppm relative to vanadium oxytrichloride; suggesting that rapid proton exchange occurs resulting in equally symmetric species. The three protonations of decavanadate have been shown to occur at the bridging oxygen centers, indicated as B and C in figure 1.

Decavanadate is most stable in the pH 4–7 region. Solutions of vanadate turn bright orange at pH 6.5, indicating the presence of decavanadate. Other vanadates are colorless. Below pH 2.0, brown V_{2}O_{5} precipitates as the hydrate.

V_{10}O^{6−}_{28} + 6 H^{+} + 12 H_{2} ⇌ 5 V_{2}O_{5}

== Structure ==
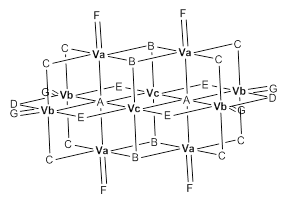
Figure 1: structure of decavanadate ion with equivalent V and O atoms indicated

The decavanadate ion consists of ten fused VO_{6} octahedra and has D_{2h} symmetry. The structure of Na_{6}[V_{10}O_{28}]·18H_{2}O has been confirmed with X-ray crystallography.

The decavanadate anions contains three sets of equivalent V atoms (see fig. 1). These include two central VO_{6} octahedra (V_{c}) and four each peripheral tetragonal-pyramidal VO_{5} groups (V_{a} and V_{b}). There are seven unique groups of oxygen atoms (labeled A through G). Two of these (A) bridge to six V centers, four (B) bridge three V centers, fourteen of these (C, D and E) span edges between pairs of V centers, and eight (F and G) are peripheral.

The oxidation state of vanadium in decavanadate is +5.

== Preparation ==
The preparation of decavanadate is achieved by acidifying an aqueous solution of orthovanadate (VO^{3−}_{4}:

10 Na_{3}[VO_{4}] + 24 HOAc → Na_{6}[V_{10}O_{28}] + 12 H_{2}O + 24 NaOAc

The formation of decavanadate is optimized by maintaining a pH range of 4–7. Typical side products include metavanadate, VO^{−}_{3}, and hexavanadate, V_{6}O^{2−}_{16}, ions.

== Potential uses ==
Decavanadate has been found to inhibit phosphoglycerate mutase, an enzyme which catalyzes step 8 of glycolysis. In addition, decavandate was found to have modest inhibition of Leishmania tarentolae viability, suggesting that decavandate may have a potential use as a topical inhibitor of protozoan parasites.

== Related decavanadates ==
Many decavanadate salts have been characterized. NH^{+}_{4}, Ca^{2+}, Ba^{2+}, Sr^{2+}, and group I decavanadate salts are prepared by the acid–base reaction between V_{2}O_{5} and the oxide, hydroxide, carbonate, or hydrogen carbonate of the desired positive ion.

6 NH_{3} + 5 V_{2}O_{5} + 3 H_{2}O ⇌ (NH_{4})_{6}[V_{10}O_{28}]

Other decavanadates:

(NH_{4})_{6}[V_{10}O_{28}]·6H_{2}O
K_{6}[V_{10}O_{28}]·9H_{2}O
K_{6}[V_{10}O_{28}]·10H_{2}O
Ca_{3}[V_{10}O_{28}]·16H_{2}O
K_{2}Mg_{2}[V_{10}O_{28}]·16H_{2}O
K_{2}Zn_{2}[V_{10}O_{28}]·16H_{2}O
Cs_{2}Mg_{2}[V_{10}O_{28}]·16H_{2}O
Cs_{4}Na_{2}[V_{10}O_{28}]·10H_{2}O
K_{4}Na_{2}[V_{10}O_{28}]·16H_{2}O
Sr_{3}[V_{10}O_{28}]·22H_{2}O
Ba_{3}[V_{10}O_{28}]·19H_{2}O
[(C_{6}H_{5})_{4}P]H_{3}V_{10}O_{28}·4CH_{3}CN
Ag_{6}[V_{10}O_{28}]·4H_{2}O

Naturally occurring decavanadates include:

Ca_{3}V_{10}O_{28}·17H_{2}O (Pascoite)
Ca_{2}Mg(V_{10}O_{28})·16H_{2}O (Magnesiopascoite)
Na_{4}Mg(V_{10}O_{28})·24H_{2}O (Huemulite)
