= Ammonium metavanadate =

Ammonium vanadate
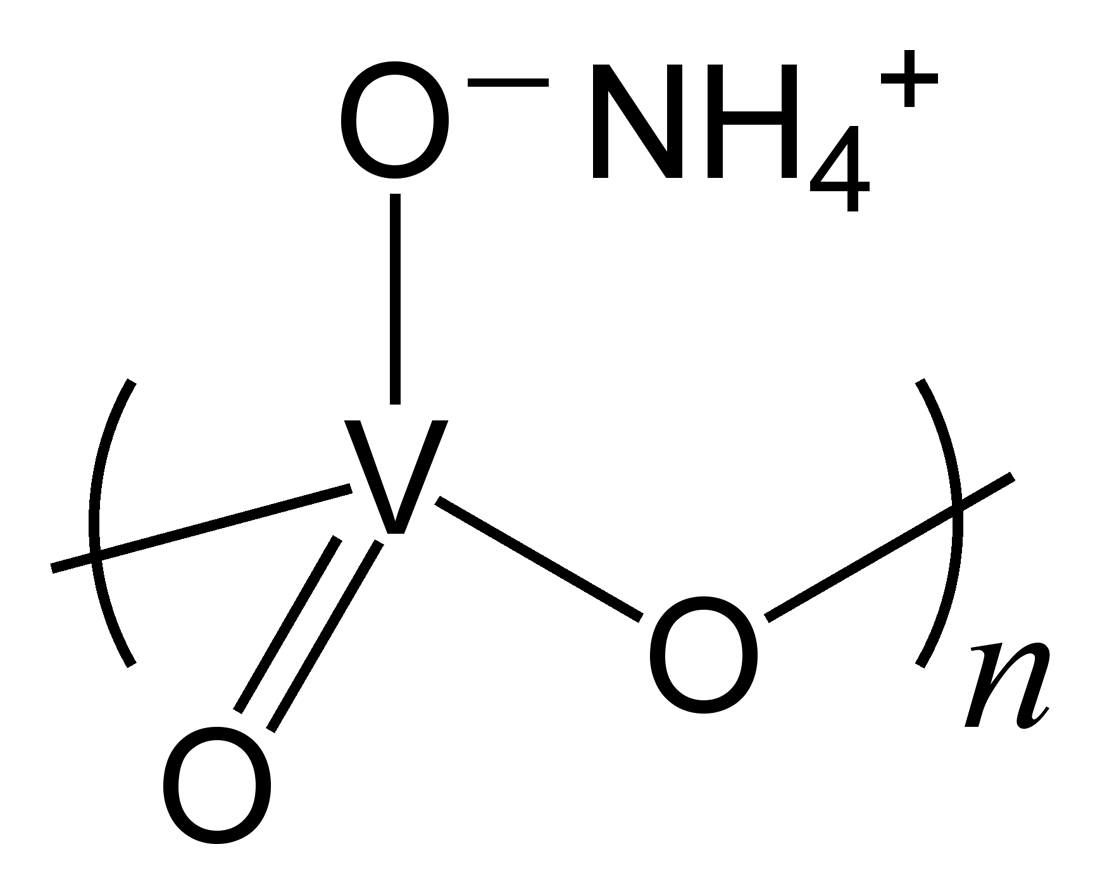
- Ammonium vanadate

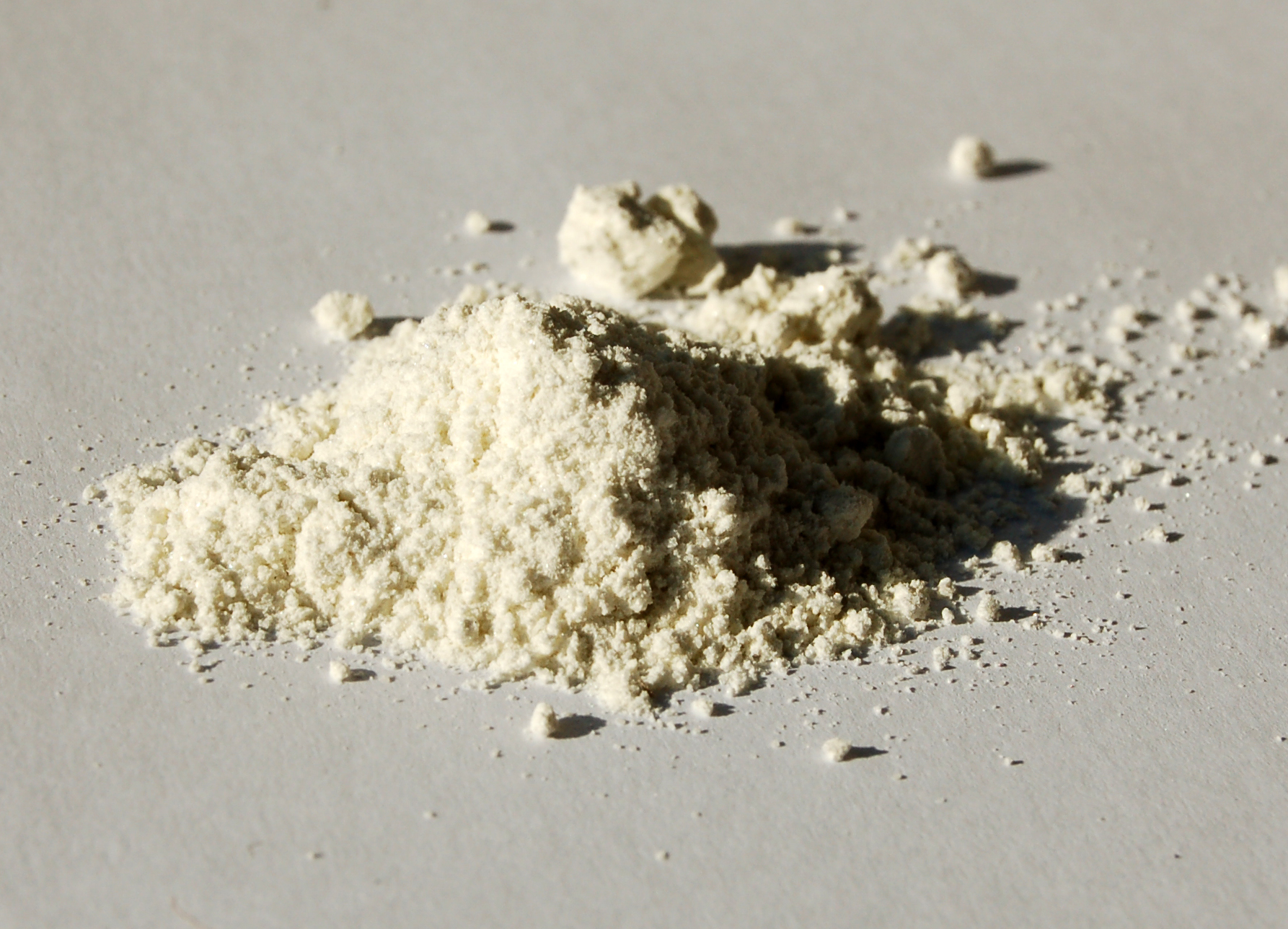
- Photo of a sample of ammonium vanadate

Names
- IUPAC name Ammonium trioxovanadate(V)
- Other names Ammonium vanadate

Identifiers
CAS Number	7803-55-6
3D model (JSmol)	Interactive image
ChemSpider	19968892
ECHA InfoCard	100.029.329
PubChem CID	516859
RTECS number	YWD875000
UNII	FL85PX638G
UN number	2859
CompTox Dashboard (EPA)	DTXSID1052533
- InChI: InChI=1S/H3N.3O.V/h1H3;;;;/q;;;;-1/p+1 Key: UXJVWJGDHIZPLD-UHFFFAOYSA-O; InChI=1/H3N.3O.V/h1H3;;;;/q;;;;- 1/p+1/rH3N.O3V/c;1-4(2)3/h1H3;/q;-1/p+1 Key: UXJVWJGDHIZPLD-KKTKNITLAZ
- SMILES: [NH4+].O=[V-](=O)=O

Properties
Chemical formula	NH_{4}VO_{3}
Molar mass	116.98 g/mol
Appearance	white
Density	2.326 g/cm^{3}
Melting point	>200 °C (392 °F; 473 K) (decomposes)
Solubility in water	4.8 g/100 ml (20 °C)
Solubility	soluble in diethanolamine, ethanolamine

Hazards
- Occupational safety and health (OHS/OSH)
Main hazards	possible mutagen, dangerous for the environment
- GHS labelling
Pictograms	(GHS06: Toxic) (GHS08: Health hazard)
Signal word	Danger
Hazard statements	H301, H332, H340, H361, H370, H372, H412
Precautionary statements	P201, P202, P260, P264, P270, P271, P273, P281, P301+P310, P304+P312, P304+P340, P307+P311, P308+P313, P312, P314, P321, P330, P405, P501
NFPA 704 (fire diamond)	4 0 0
Flash point	Non-flammable
- Lethal dose or concentration (LD, LC)
LD_{50} (median dose)	58.1 mg/kg, oral (rat)

Related compounds
Other anions	Ammonium orthovanadate Ammonium hexavanadate
Other cations	Sodium metavanadate Potassium metavanadate
Related compounds	Vanadium pentoxide
- Except where otherwise noted, data are given for materials in their standard state (at 25 °C [77 °F], 100 kPa). verify (what is ?) Infobox references

Ammonium metavanadate is the inorganic compound with the formula NH_{4}VO_{3}. It is a white salt, although samples are often yellow owing to impurities of V_{2}O_{5}. It is an important intermediate in the purification of vanadium.

== Synthesis and structure ==
The compound is prepared by the addition of ammonium salts to solutions of vanadate ions, generated by dissolution of V_{2}O_{5} in basic aqueous solutions, such as hot sodium carbonate. The compound precipitates as a colourless solid. This precipitation step can be slow.

The compound adopts a polymeric structure consisting of chains of [VO_{3}]^{−}, formed as corner-sharing VO_{4} tetrahedra. These chains are interconnected via hydrogen bonds with ammonium ions.

ball-and-stick model	polyhedral model	[(VO_{3})_{n}]^{n−} chains

== Uses ==
Vanadium is often purified from aqueous extracts of slags and ore by selective precipitation of ammonium metavanadate. The material is then roasted to give vanadium pentoxide:

2 NH_{4}VO_{3} → V_{2}O_{5} + 2 NH_{3} + H_{2}O

=== Other ===
Vanadates can behave as structural mimics of phosphates, and in this way they exhibit biological activity.

Ammonium metavanadate is used to prepare Mandelin reagent, a qualitative test for alkaloids.
