= Group 5 element =

Group of elements in the periodic table

Group 5 in the periodic table
Hydrogen																															Helium
Lithium	Beryllium																									Boron	Carbon	Nitrogen	Oxygen	Fluorine	Neon
Sodium	Magnesium																									Aluminium	Silicon	Phosphorus	Sulfur	Chlorine	Argon
Potassium	Calcium															Scandium	Titanium	Vanadium	Chromium	Manganese	Iron	Cobalt	Nickel	Copper	Zinc	Gallium	Germanium	Arsenic	Selenium	Bromine	Krypton
Rubidium	Strontium															Yttrium	Zirconium	Niobium	Molybdenum	Technetium	Ruthenium	Rhodium	Palladium	Silver	Cadmium	Indium	Tin	Antimony	Tellurium	Iodine	Xenon
Caesium	Barium	Lanthanum	Cerium	Praseodymium	Neodymium	Promethium	Samarium	Europium	Gadolinium	Terbium	Dysprosium	Holmium	Erbium	Thulium	Ytterbium	Lutetium	Hafnium	Tantalum	Tungsten	Rhenium	Osmium	Iridium	Platinum	Gold	Mercury (element)	Thallium	Lead	Bismuth	Polonium	Astatine	Radon
Francium	Radium	Actinium	Thorium	Protactinium	Uranium	Neptunium	Plutonium	Americium	Curium	Berkelium	Californium	Einsteinium	Fermium	Mendelevium	Nobelium	Lawrencium	Rutherfordium	Dubnium	Seaborgium	Bohrium	Hassium	Meitnerium	Darmstadtium	Roentgenium	Copernicium	Nihonium	Flerovium	Moscovium	Livermorium	Tennessine	Oganesson
group 4 ← → group 6
IUPAC group number	5
Name by element	vanadium group
CAS group number (US, pattern A-B-A)	VB
old IUPAC number (Europe, pattern A-B)	VA

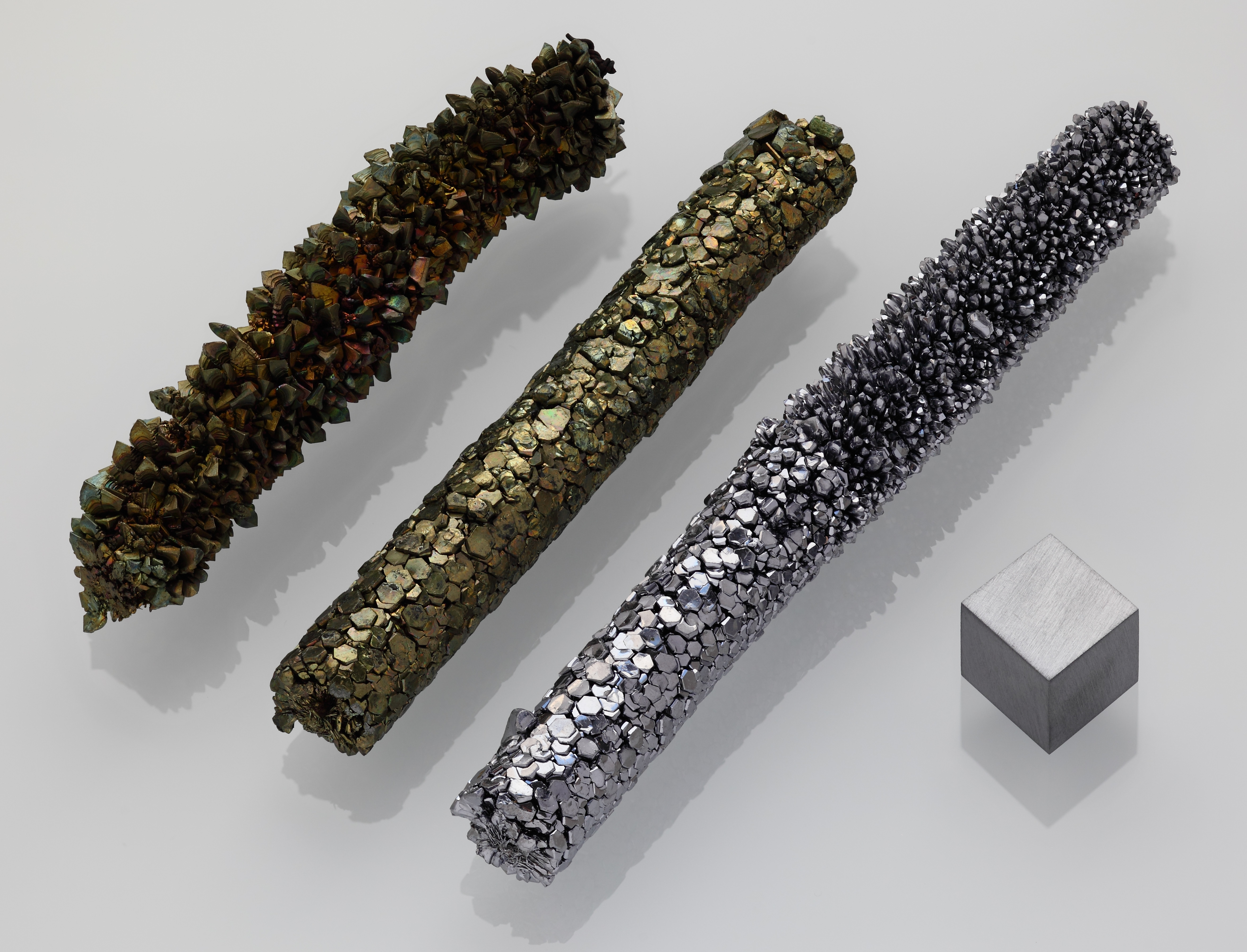
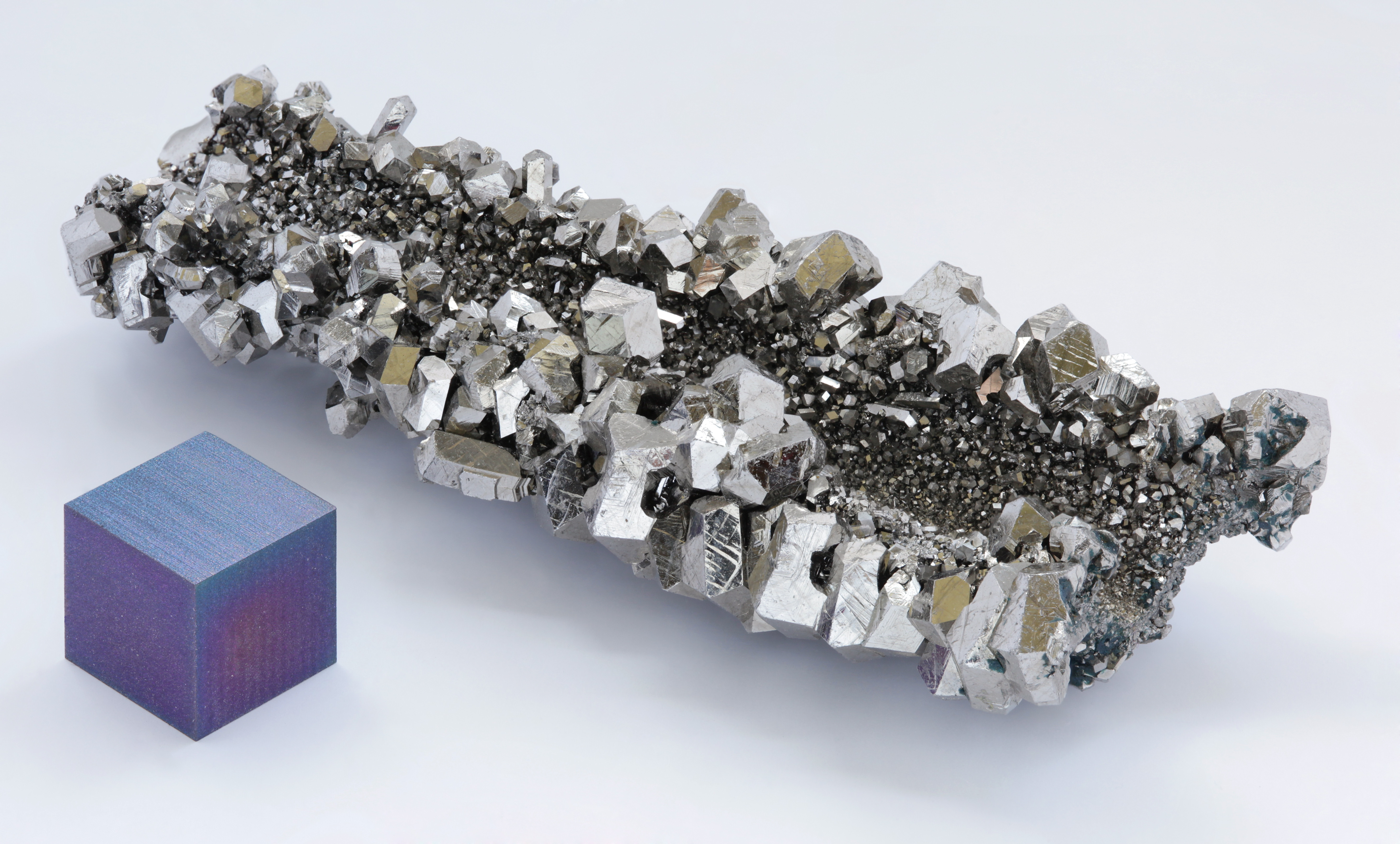
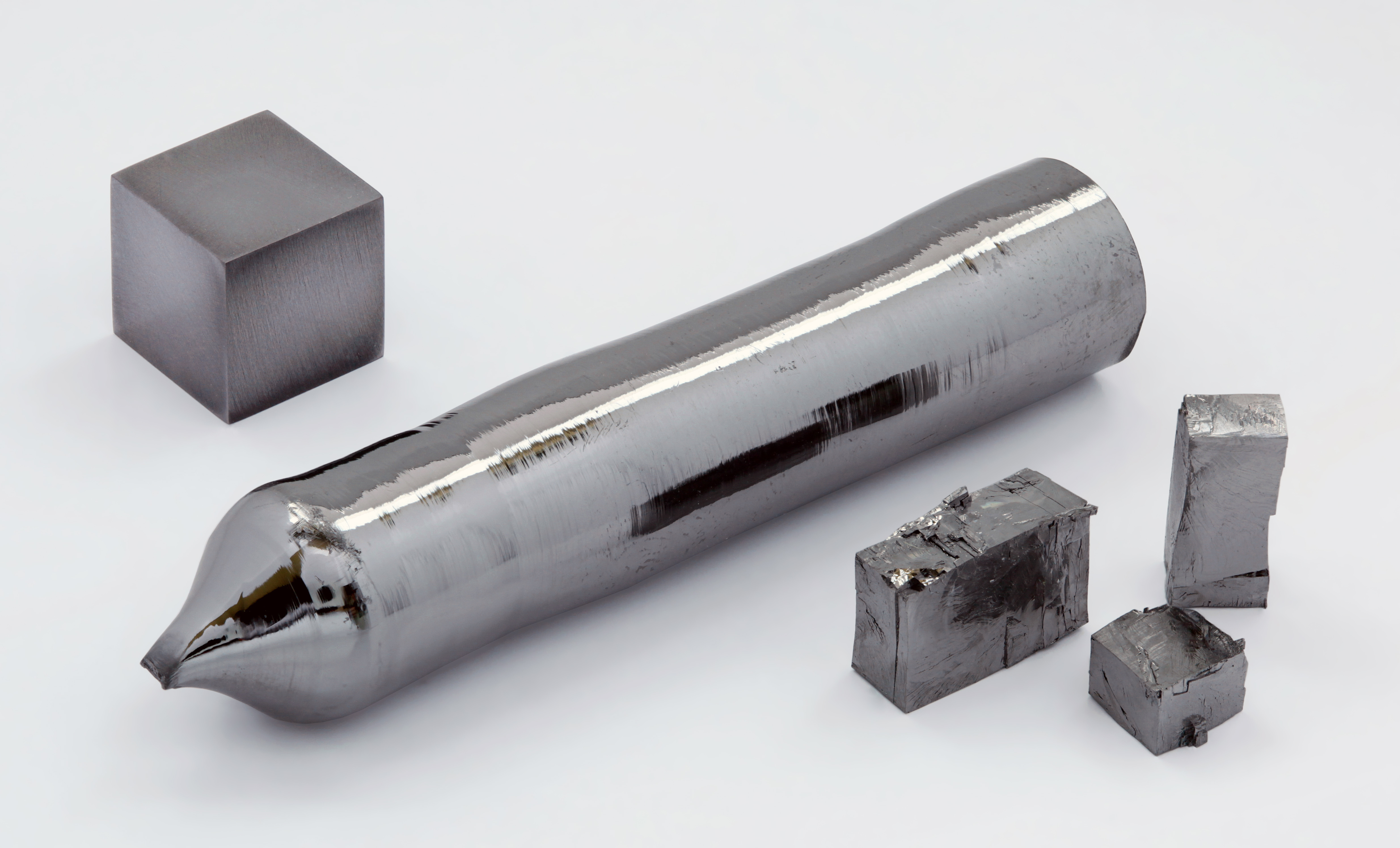
↓ Period
4	Vanadium (V); 23 Transition metal
5	Niobium (Nb); 41 Transition metal
6	Tantalum (Ta); 73 Transition metal
7	Dubnium (Db); 105 Transition metal
Legend primordial element synthetic element

Group 5 is a group of elements in the periodic table. Group 5 contains vanadium (V), niobium (Nb), tantalum (Ta) and dubnium (Db). This group lies in the d-block of the periodic table. This group is sometimes called the vanadium group or vanadium family after its lightest member; however, the group itself has not acquired a trivial name because it belongs to the broader grouping of the transition metals.

As is typical for early transition metals, niobium and tantalum have only the group oxidation state of +5 as a major one, and are quite electropositive (it is easy to donate electrons) and have a less rich coordination chemistry (the chemistry of metallic ions bound with molecules). Due to the effects of the lanthanide contraction, the decrease in ionic radii in the lanthanides, they are very similar in properties. Vanadium is somewhat distinct due to its smaller size: it has well-defined +2, +3 and +4 states as well (although +5 is more stable).

The lighter three Group 5 elements occur naturally and share similar properties; all three are hard refractory metals under standard conditions. The fourth element, dubnium, has been synthesized in laboratories, but it has not been found occurring in nature, with half-life of the most stable isotope, dubnium-268, being only 16 hours, and other isotopes even more radioactive.

== History ==
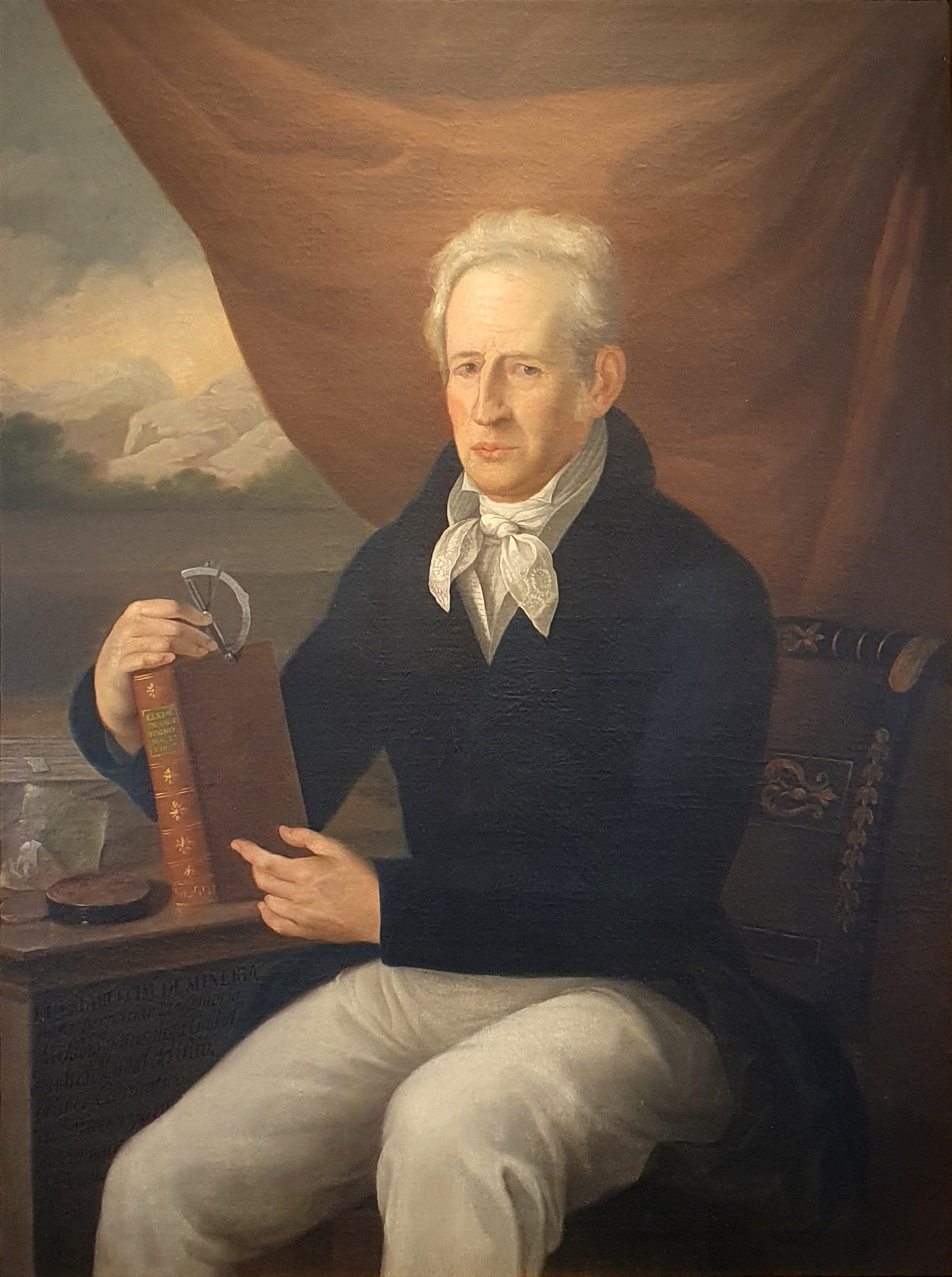
Andrés Manuel del Río, the discoverer of vanadium

Group 5 is the new IUPAC name for this group; the old style name was group VB in the old US system (CAS) or group VA in the European system (old IUPAC). Group 5 must not be confused with the group with the old-style group crossed names of either VA (US system, CAS) or VB (European system, old IUPAC); that group is now called the pnictogens or group 15.

=== Vanadium ===
Vanadium was discovered in 1801 by the Spanish mineralogist Andrés Manuel del Río. Del Río extracted the element from a sample of Mexican "brown lead" ore, later named vanadinite. He found that its salts exhibit a wide variety of colors, and as a result he named the element panchromium (Greek: παγχρώμιο "all colors"). Later, Del Río renamed the element erythronium (Greek: ερυθρός "red") because most of the salts turned red upon heating. In 1805, French chemist Hippolyte Victor Collet-Descotils, backed by del Río's friend Baron Alexander von Humboldt, incorrectly declared that del Río's new element was an impure sample of chromium. Del Río accepted Collet-Descotils' statement and retracted his claim.

In 1831 Swedish chemist Nils Gabriel Sefström rediscovered the element in a new oxide he found while working with iron ores. Later that year, Friedrich Wöhler confirmed del Río's earlier work. Sefström chose a name beginning with V, which had not yet been assigned to any element. He called the element vanadium after Old Norse Vanadís (another name for the Norse Vanir goddess Freyja, whose attributes include beauty and fertility), because of the many beautifully colored chemical compounds it produces. In 1831, the geologist George William Featherstonhaugh suggested that vanadium should be renamed rionium after del Río, but this suggestion was not followed.

=== Niobium and tantalum ===
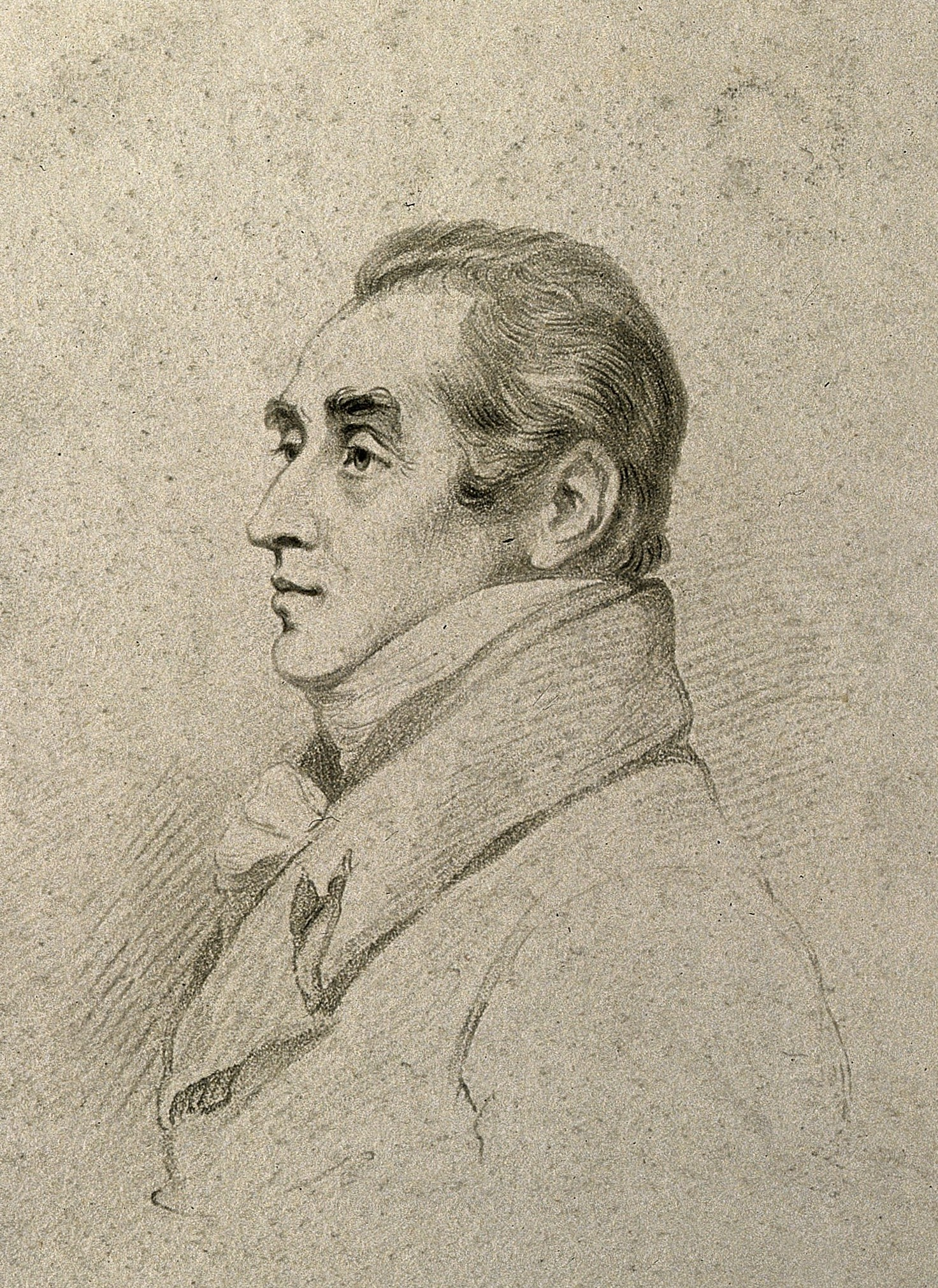
Charles Hatchett, the discover of niobium

Niobium was identified by English chemist Charles Hatchett in 1801. He found a new element in a mineral sample that had been sent to England from Connecticut, United States in 1734 by John Winthrop F.R.S. (grandson of John Winthrop the Younger) and named the mineral columbite and the new element columbium after Columbia, the poetic name for the United States. However, after the 15th Conference of the Union of Chemistry in Amsterdam in 1949, the name niobium was chosen for element 41. The columbium discovered by Hatchett was probably a mixture of the new element with tantalum, which was first discovered in 1802 by Anders Gustav Ekeberg.

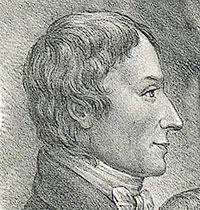
Anders Gustav Ekeberg, the discoverer of tantalum

Subsequently, there was considerable confusion over the difference between niobium (columbium) and the closely related tantalum. In 1809, English chemist William Hyde Wollaston compared the oxides derived from both niobium - columbite, with a density 5.918 g/cm^{3}, and tantalum - tantalite, with a density over 8 g/cm^{3}, and concluded that the two oxides, despite the significant difference in density, were identical; thus he kept the name tantalum. This conclusion was disputed in 1846 by German chemist Heinrich Rose, who argued that there were two different elements in the tantalite sample, and named them after children of Tantalus: niobium (from Niobe) and pelopium (from Pelops). This confusion arose from the minimal observed differences between tantalum and niobium. The claimed new elements pelopium, ilmenium, and dianium were in fact identical to niobium or mixtures of niobium and tantalum. Pure tantalum was not produced until 1903.

=== Dubnium ===
The last element of the group, dubnium, does not occur naturally and so must be synthesized in a laboratory. The first reported detection was by a team at the Joint Institute for Nuclear Research (JINR), which in 1968 had produced the new element by bombarding an americium-243 target with a beam of neon-22 ions, and reported 9.4 MeV (with a half-life of 0.1–3 seconds) and 9.7 MeV (t_{1/2} > 0.05 s) alpha activities followed by alpha activities similar to those of either ^{256}103 or ^{257}103. Based on prior theoretical predictions, the two activity lines were assigned to ^{261}105 and ^{260}105, respectively.

After observing the alpha decays of element 105, the researchers aimed to observe the spontaneous fission (SF) of the element and study the resulting fission fragments. They published a paper in February 1970, reporting multiple examples of two such activities, with half-lives of 14 ms and 2.2±0.5 s. They assigned the former activity to ^{242mf}Am (Note: This notation signifies that the nucleus is a nuclear isomer that decays via spontaneous fission.) and ascribed the latter activity to an isotope of element 105. They suggested that it was unlikely that this activity could come from a transfer reaction instead of element 105, because the yield ratio for this reaction was significantly lower than that of the ^{242mf}Am-producing transfer reaction, in accordance with theoretical predictions. To establish that this activity was not from a (^{22}Ne,xn) reaction, the researchers bombarded a ^{243}Am target with ^{18}O ions; reactions producing ^{256}103 and ^{257}103 showed very little SF activity (matching the established data), and the reaction producing heavier ^{258}103 and ^{259}103 produced no SF activity at all, in line with theoretical data. The researchers concluded that the activities observed came from SF of element 105.

JINR then attempted an experiment to create element 105, published in a report in May 1970. They claimed that they had synthesized more nuclei of element 105 and that the experiment confirmed their previous work. According to the paper, the isotope produced by JINR was probably ^{261}105, or possibly ^{260}105. This report included an initial chemical examination: the thermal gradient version of the gas-chromatography method was applied to demonstrate that the chloride of what had formed from the SF activity nearly matched that of niobium pentachloride, rather than hafnium tetrachloride. The team identified a 2.2-second SF activity in a volatile chloride portraying eka-tantalum properties, and inferred that the source of the SF activity must have been element 105.

In June 1970, JINR made improvements on their first experiment, using a purer target and reducing the intensity of transfer reactions by installing a collimator before the catcher. This time, they were able to find 9.1 MeV alpha activities with daughter isotopes identifiable as either ^{256}103 or ^{257}103, implying that the original isotope was either ^{260}105 or ^{261}105.

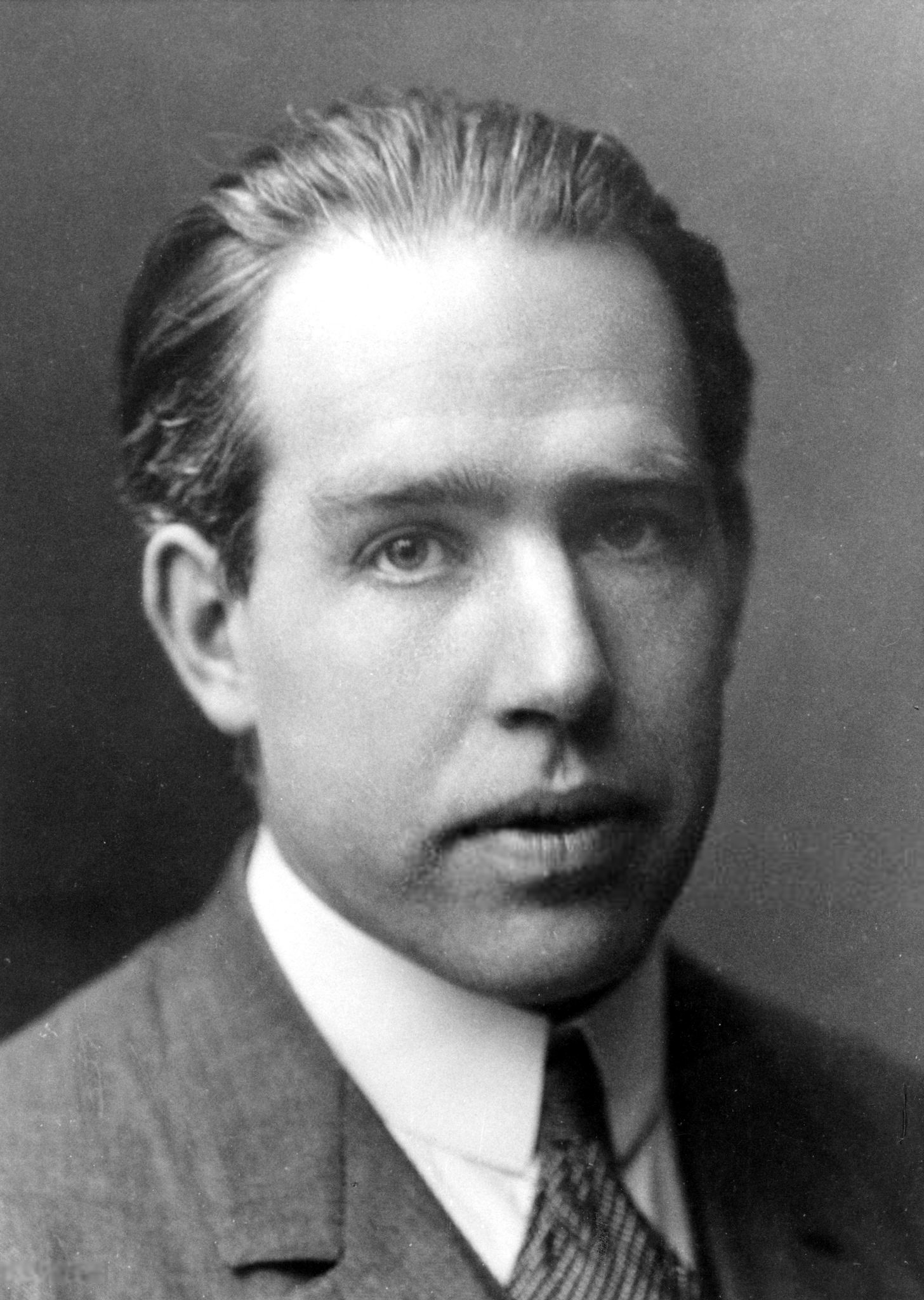
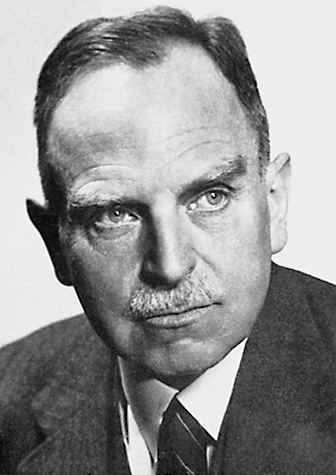
Danish nuclear physicist Niels Bohr and German nuclear chemist Otto Hahn, both proposed as possible namesakes for element 105

A controversy erupted on who had discovered the element, which each group suggesting its own name: the Dubna group named the element nielsbohrium after Niels Bohr, while the Berkeley group named it hahnium after Otto Hahn. Eventually a joint working party of IUPAC and IUPAP, the Transfermium Working Group, decided that credit for the discovery should be shared. After various compromises were attempted, where element 105 was called kurchatovium, joliotium and hahnium, in 1997 IUPAC officially named the element dubnium after Dubna, and nielsbohrium was eventually simplified to bohrium and used for element 107.

== Chemical properties ==
Like other groups, the members of this family show patterns in its electron configuration, especially the outermost shells. (The expected 4d^{3} 5s^{2} configuration for niobium is a very low-lying excited state at about 0.14 eV.)

Electron configurations of group 5 elements
Z	Element	Electrons per shell	Electron configuration
23	V, vanadium	2, 8, 11, 2	[Ar] 3d^{3} 4s^{2}
41	Nb, niobium	2, 8, 18, 12, 1	[Kr] 4d^{4} 5s^{1}
73	Ta, tantalum	2, 8, 18, 32, 11, 2	[Xe] 4f^{14} 5d^{3} 6s^{2}
105	Db, dubnium	2, 8, 18, 32, 32, 11, 2	[Rn] 5f^{14} 6d^{3} 7s^{2}

Most of the chemistry has been observed only for the first three members of the group (the chemistry of dubnium is not very established, but what is known appears to match expectations for a heavier congener of tantalum). All the elements of the group are reactive metals with a high melting points (1910 °C, 2477 °C, 3017 °C). The reactivity is not always obvious due to the rapid formation of a stable oxide layer, which prevents further reactions, similarly to trends in group 3 or group 4. The metals form different oxides: vanadium forms vanadium(II) oxide, vanadium(III) oxide, vanadium(IV) oxide and vanadium(V) oxide, niobium forms niobium(II) oxide, niobium(IV) oxide and niobium(V) oxide, but out of tantalum oxides only tantalum(V) oxide is characterized. Metal(V) oxides are generally nonreactive and act like acids rather than bases, but the lower oxides are less stable. They, however, have some unusual properties for oxides, such as high electric conductivity.

All three elements form various inorganic compounds, generally in the oxidation state of +5. Lower oxidation states are also known, but in all elements other than vanadium, they are less stable, decreasing in stability with atomic mass increase.

=== Compounds ===
==== Oxides ====
Vanadium forms oxides in the +2, +3, +4 and +5 oxidation states, forming vanadium(II) oxide (VO), vanadium(III) oxide (V_{2}O_{3}), vanadium(IV) oxide (VO_{2}) and vanadium(V) oxide (V_{2}O_{5}). Vanadium(V) oxide or vanadium pentoxide is the most common, being precursor to most alloys and compounds of vanadium, and is also a widely used industrial catalyst.

Niobium forms oxides in the oxidation states +5 (Nb_{2}O_{5}), +4 (NbO_{2}), and the rarer oxidation state, +2 (NbO). Most common is the pentoxide, also being precursor to almost all niobium compounds and alloys.

Tantalum pentoxide (Ta_{2}O_{5}) is the most important compound from the perspective of applications. Oxides of tantalum in lower oxidation states are numerous, including many defect structures, and are lightly studied or poorly characterized.

==== Oxyanions ====
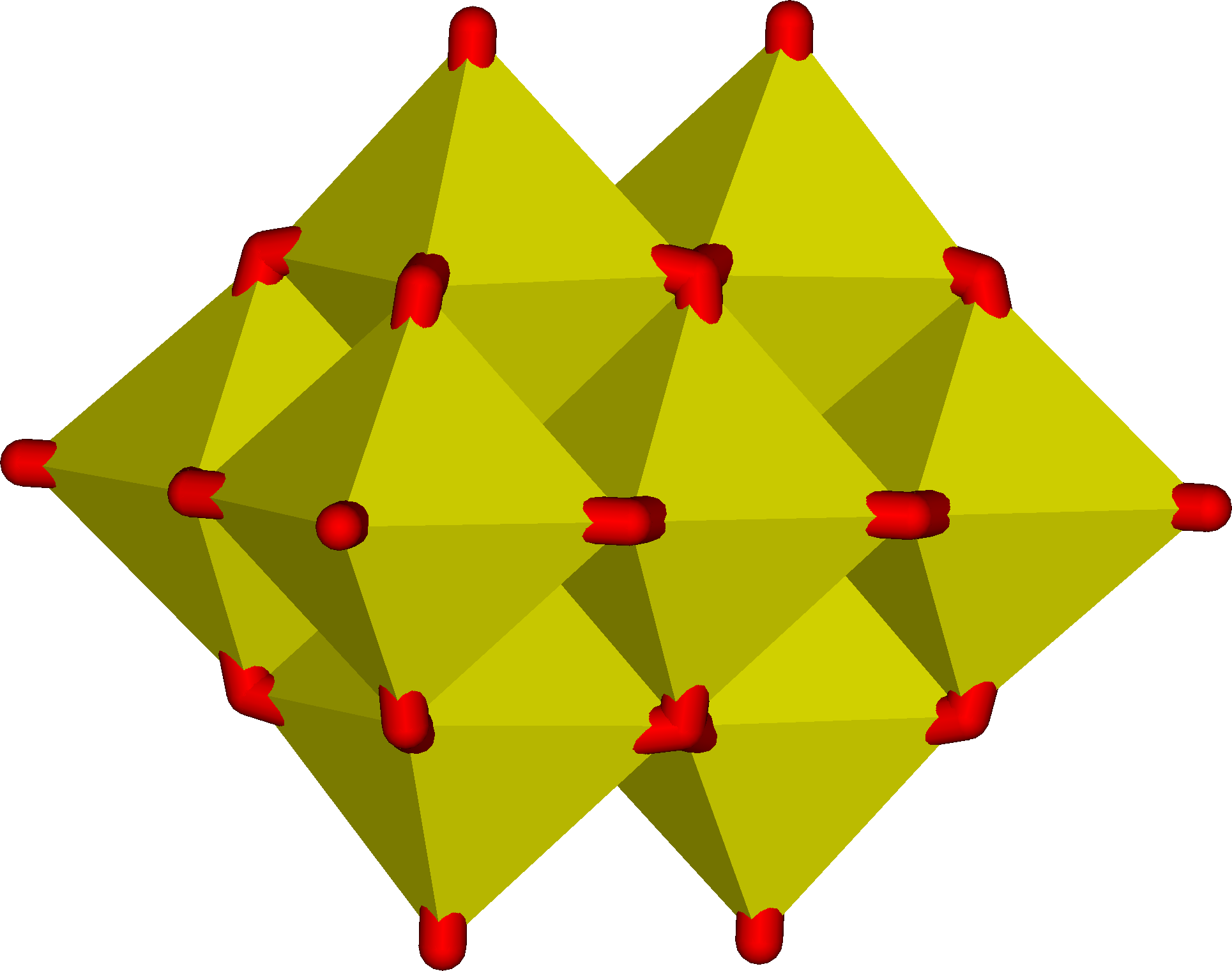
The decavanadate structure

In aqueous solution, vanadium(V) forms an extensive family of oxyanions as established by ^{51}V NMR spectroscopy. The interrelationships in this family are described by the predominance diagram, which shows at least 11 species, depending on pH and concentration. The tetrahedral orthovanadate ion, VO^{3−}_{4}, is the principal species present at pH 12–14. Similar in size and charge to phosphorus(V), vanadium(V) also parallels its chemistry and crystallography. Orthovanadate VO^{3−}_{4} is used in protein crystallography to study the biochemistry of phosphate. Beside that, this anion also has been shown to interact with activity of some specific enzymes. The tetrathiovanadate [VS_{4}]^{3−} is analogous to the orthovanadate ion.

At lower pH values, the monomer [HVO_{4}]^{2−} and dimer [V_{2}O_{7}]^{4−} are formed, with the monomer predominant at vanadium concentration of less than c. 10^{−2}M (pV > 2, where pV is equal to the minus value of the logarithm of the total vanadium concentration/M). The formation of the divanadate ion is analogous to the formation of the dichromate ion. As the pH is reduced, further protonation and condensation to polyvanadates occur: at pH 4–6 [H_{2}VO_{4}]^{−} is predominant at pV greater than ca. 4, while at higher concentrations trimers and tetramers are formed. Between pH 2–4 decavanadate predominates, though its formation from orthovanadate is optimized at pH 4–7, represented by this reaction:

10 Na_{3}[VO_{4}] + 24 HOAc → Na_{6}[V_{10}O_{28}] + 12 H_{2}O + 24 NaOAc

In decavanadate, each V(V) center is surrounded by six oxide ligands. Vanadic acid, H_{3}VO_{4} exists only at very low concentrations because protonation of the tetrahedral species [H_{2}VO_{4}]^{−} results in the preferential formation of the octahedral [VO_{2}(H_{2}O)_{4}]^{+} species. In strongly acidic solutions, pH < 2, [VO_{2}(H_{2}O)_{4}]^{+} is the predominant species, while the oxide V_{2}O_{5} precipitates from solution at high concentrations. The oxide is formally the acid anhydride of vanadic acid. The structures of many vanadate compounds have been determined by X-ray crystallography.

The Pourbaix diagram for vanadium in water, which shows the redox potentials between various vanadium species in different oxidation states.

Vanadium(V) forms various peroxo complexes, most notably in the active site of the vanadium-containing bromoperoxidase enzymes. The species VO(O)_{2}(H_{2}O)_{4}^{+} is stable in acidic solutions. In alkaline solutions, species with 2, 3 and 4 peroxide groups are known; the last forms violet salts with the formula M_{3}V(O_{2})_{4} nH_{2}O (M= Li, Na, etc.), in which the vanadium has an 8-coordinate dodecahedral structure.

Niobates are generated by dissolving the pentoxide in basic hydroxide solutions or by melting it in alkali metal oxides. Examples are lithium niobate (LiNbO_{3}) and lanthanum niobate (LaNbO_{4}). In the lithium niobate is a trigonally distorted perovskite-like structure, whereas the lanthanum niobate contains lone NbO^{3−}_{4} ions.

Tantalates, compounds containing [TaO_{4}]^{3−} or [TaO_{3}]^{−} are numerous. Lithium tantalate (LiTaO_{3}) adopts a perovskite structure. Lanthanum tantalate (LaTaO_{4}) contains isolated TaO^{3−}_{4} tetrahedra.

==== Halides and their derivatives ====
Twelve binary halides, compounds with the formula VX_{n} (n=2...5), are known. VI_{4}, VCl_{5}, VBr_{5}, and VI_{5} do not exist or are extremely unstable; the only known pure V^{5+} halide compound is VF_{5}. In combination with other reagents, VCl_{4} is used as a catalyst for polymerization of dienes. Like all binary halides, those of vanadium are Lewis acidic, especially those of V(IV) and V(V). Many of the halides form octahedral complexes with the formula VX_{n}L_{6−n} (X= halide; L= other ligand).

Many vanadium oxyhalides (formula VO_{m}X_{n}) are known. The oxytrichloride and oxytrifluoride (VOCl_{3} and VOF_{3}) are the most widely studied. Akin to POCl_{3}, they are volatile, adopt tetrahedral structures in the gas phase, and are Lewis acidic.

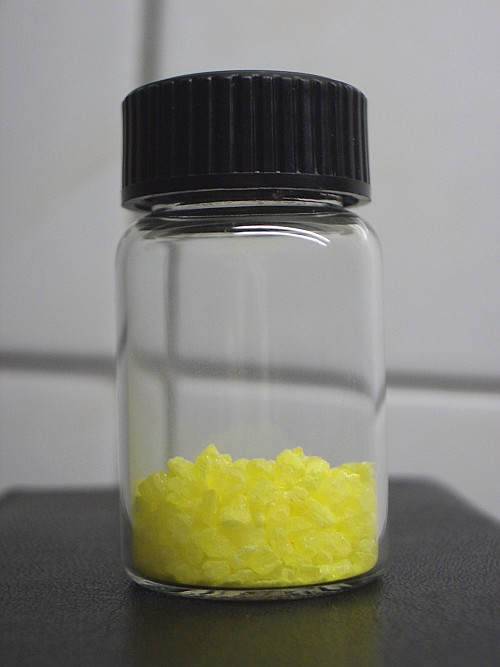
A very pure sample of niobium pentachloride

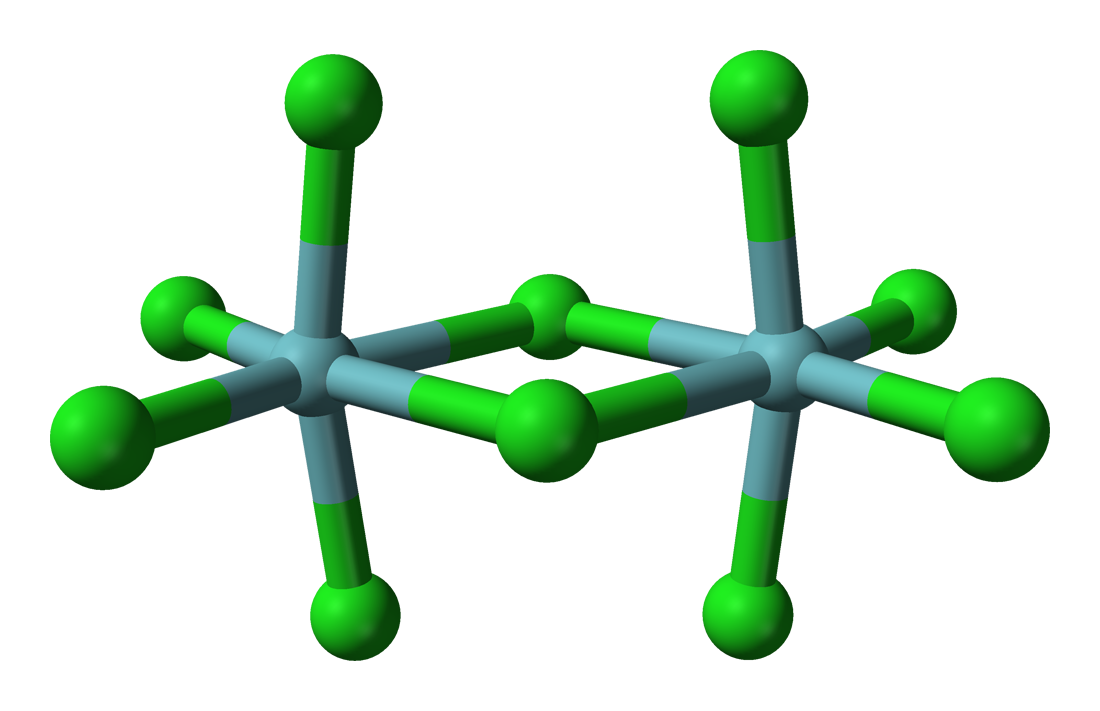
Ball-and-stick model of niobium pentachloride, which exists as a dimer

Niobium forms halides in the oxidation states of +5 and +4 as well as diverse substoichiometric compounds. The pentahalides (NbX_{5}) feature octahedral Nb centres. Niobium pentafluoride (NbF_{5}) is a white solid with a melting point of 79.0 °C and niobium pentachloride (NbCl_{5}) is yellow (see image at left) with a melting point of 203.4 °C. Both are hydrolyzed to give oxides and oxyhalides, such as NbOCl_{3}. The pentachloride is a versatile reagent used to generate the organometallic compounds, such as niobocene dichloride ((C_{5}H_{5})_{2}NbCl_{2}). The tetrahalides (NbX_{4}) are dark-coloured polymers with Nb-Nb bonds; for example, the black hygroscopic niobium tetrafluoride (NbF_{4}) and dark violet niobium tetrachloride (NbCl_{4}).

Anionic halide compounds of niobium are well known, owing in part to the Lewis acidity of the pentahalides. The most important is [NbF_{7}]^{2−}, an intermediate in the separation of Nb and Ta from the ores. This heptafluoride tends to form the oxopentafluoride more readily than does the tantalum compound. Other halide complexes include octahedral [NbCl_{6}]^{−}:

Nb_{2}Cl_{10} + 2 Cl^{−} → 2 [NbCl_{6}]^{−}

As with other metals with low atomic numbers, a variety of reduced halide cluster ions is known, the prime example being [Nb_{6}Cl_{18}]^{4−}.

Tantalum halides span the oxidation states of +5, +4, and +3. Tantalum pentafluoride (TaF_{5}) is a white solid with a melting point of 97.0 °C. The anion [TaF_{7}]^{2-} is used for its separation from niobium. The chloride TaCl_{5}, which exists as a dimer, is the main reagent in synthesis of new Ta compounds. It hydrolyzes readily to an oxychloride. The lower halides TaX_{4} and TaX_{3}, feature Ta-Ta bonds.

== Physical properties ==
The trends in group 5 follow those of the other early d-block groups and reflect the addition of a filled f-shell into the core in passing from the fifth to the sixth period. All the stable members of the group are silvery-blue refractory metals, though impurities of carbon, nitrogen, and oxygen make them brittle. They all crystallize in the body-centered cubic structure at room temperature, and dubnium is expected to do the same.

The table below is a summary of the key physical properties of the group 5 elements. The question-marked value is predicted.

Properties of the group 5 elements
Name	V, vanadium	Nb, niobium	Ta, tantalum	Db, dubnium
Melting point	2183 K (1910 °C)	2750 K (2477 °C)	3290 K (3017 °C)	Unknown
Boiling point	3680 K (3407 °C)	5017 K (4744 °C)	5731 K (5458 °C)	Unknown
Density	6.11 g·cm^{−3}	8.57 g·cm^{−3}	16.69 g·cm^{−3}	21.6 g·cm^{−3}?
Appearance	blue-silver-gray metal	grayish metallic, blue when oxidized	gray blue	Unknown
Atomic radius	135 pm	146 pm	146 pm	139 pm

=== Vanadium ===
Vanadium is an average-hard, ductile, steel-blue metal. It is electrically conductive and thermally insulating. Some sources describe vanadium as "soft", perhaps because it is ductile, malleable, and not brittle. Vanadium is harder than most metals and steels (see Hardnesses of the elements (data page) and iron). It has good resistance to corrosion and it is stable against alkalis and sulfuric and hydrochloric acids. It is oxidized in air at about 933 K (660 °C, 1220 °F), although an oxide passivation layer forms even at room temperature.

=== Niobium ===
Niobium is a lustrous, grey, ductile, paramagnetic metal in group 5 of the periodic table (see table), with an electron configuration in the outermost shells atypical for group 5. Similarly atypical configurations occur in the neighborhood of ruthenium (44) and rhodium (45).

Although it is thought to have a body-centered cubic crystal structure from absolute zero to its melting point, high-resolution measurements of the thermal expansion along the three crystallographic axes reveal anisotropies which are inconsistent with a cubic structure.

Niobium becomes a superconductor at cryogenic temperatures. At atmospheric pressure, it has the highest critical temperature of the elemental superconductors at 9.2 K. Niobium has the greatest magnetic penetration depth of any element. In addition, it is one of the three elemental Type II superconductors, along with vanadium and technetium. The superconductive properties are strongly dependent on the purity of the niobium metal.

When very pure, it is comparatively soft and ductile, but impurities make it harder.

The metal has a low capture cross-section for thermal neutrons; thus it is used in the nuclear industries where neutron transparent structures are desired.

=== Tantalum ===
Tantalum is dark (blue-gray), dense, ductile, very hard, easily fabricated, and highly conductive of heat and electricity. The metal is renowned for its resistance to corrosion by acids; in fact, at temperatures below 150 °C tantalum is almost completely immune to attack by the normally aggressive aqua regia. It can be dissolved with hydrofluoric acid or acidic solutions containing the fluoride ion and sulfur trioxide, as well as with a solution of potassium hydroxide. Tantalum's high melting point of 3017 °C (boiling point 5458 °C) is exceeded among the elements only by tungsten, rhenium osmium, and carbon.

Tantalum exists in two crystalline phases, alpha and beta. The alpha phase is relatively ductile and soft; it has body-centered cubic structure (space group Im3m, lattice constant a = 0.33058 nm), Knoop hardness 200–400 HN and electrical resistivity 15–60 μΩ⋅cm. The beta phase is hard and brittle; its crystal symmetry is tetragonal (space group P42/mnm, a = 1.0194 nm, c = 0.5313 nm), Knoop hardness is 1000–1300 HN and electrical resistivity is relatively high at 170–210 μΩ⋅cm. The beta phase is metastable and converts to the alpha phase upon heating to 750–775 °C. Bulk tantalum is almost entirely alpha phase, and the beta phase usually exists as thin films obtained by magnetron sputtering, chemical vapor deposition or electrochemical deposition from a eutectic molten salt solution.

=== Dubnium ===
Relativistic (solid line) and nonrelativistic (dashed line) radial distribution of the 7s valence electrons in dubnium.

A direct relativistic effect is that as the atomic numbers of elements increase, the innermost electrons begin to revolve faster around the nucleus as a result of an increase of electromagnetic attraction between an electron and a nucleus. Similar effects have been found for the outermost s orbitals (and p_{1/2} ones, though in dubnium they are not occupied): for example, the 7s orbital contracts by 25% in size and is stabilized by 2.6 eV.

A more indirect effect is that the contracted s and p_{1/2} orbitals shield the charge of the nucleus more effectively, leaving less for the outer d and f electrons, which therefore move in larger orbitals. Dubnium is greatly affected by this: unlike the previous group 5 members, its 7s electrons are slightly more difficult to extract than its 6d electrons.

Relativistic stabilization of the ns orbitals, the destabilization of the (n-1)d orbitals and their spin–orbit splitting for the group 5 elements.

Another effect is the spin–orbit interaction, particularly spin–orbit splitting, which splits the 6d subshell—the azimuthal quantum number ℓ of a d shell is 2—into two subshells, with four of the ten orbitals having their ℓ lowered to 3/2 and six raised to 5/2. All ten energy levels are raised; four of them are lower than the other six. (The three 6d electrons normally occupy the lowest energy levels, 6d_{3/2}.)

A single ionized atom of dubnium (Db^{+}) should lose a 6d electron compared to a neutral atom; the doubly (Db^{2+}) or triply (Db^{3+}) ionized atoms of dubnium should eliminate 7s electrons, unlike its lighter homologs. Despite the changes, dubnium is still expected to have five valence electrons; 7p energy levels have not been shown to influence dubnium and its properties. As the 6d orbitals of dubnium are more destabilized than the 5d ones of tantalum, and Db^{3+} is expected to have two 6d, rather than 7s, electrons remaining, the resulting +3 oxidation state is expected to be unstable and even rarer than that of tantalum. The ionization potential of dubnium in its maximum +5 oxidation state should be slightly lower than that of tantalum and the ionic radius of dubnium should increase compared to tantalum; this has a significant effect on dubnium's chemistry.

Atoms of dubnium in the solid state should arrange themselves in a body-centered cubic configuration, like the previous group 5 elements. The predicted density of dubnium is 21.6 g/cm^{3}.

== Occurrence ==
There are 160 parts per million of vanadium in the Earth's crust, making it the 19th most abundant element. Soil contains on average 100 parts per million of vanadium, and seawater contains 1.5 parts per billion of vanadium. A typical human contains 285 parts per billion of vanadium. Over 60 vanadium ores are known, including vanadinite, patronite, and carnotite. There are 20 parts per million of niobium in the Earth's crust, making it the 33rd most abundant element there. Soil contains on average 24 parts per million of niobium, and seawater contains 900 parts per quadrillion of niobium. A typical human contains 21 parts per billion of niobium. Niobium is in the minerals columbite and pyrochlore. There are 2 parts per million of tantalum in the Earth's crust, making it the 51st most abundant element there. Soil contains on average 1 to 2 parts per billion of tantalum, and seawater contains 2 parts per trillion of tantalum. A typical human contains 2.9 parts per billion of tantalum. Tantalum is found in the minerals tantalite and pyrochlore. Dubnium does not occur naturally in the Earth's crust, as it has no stable isotopes.

== Production ==
=== Vanadium ===
Vanadium metal is obtained by a multistep process that begins with roasting crushed ore with NaCl or Na_{2}CO_{3} at about 850 °C to give sodium metavanadate (NaVO_{3}). An aqueous extract of this solid is acidified to produce "red cake", a polyvanadate salt, which is reduced with calcium metal. As an alternative for small-scale production, vanadium pentoxide is reduced with hydrogen or magnesium. Many other methods are also used, in all of which vanadium is produced as a byproduct of other processes. Purification of vanadium is possible by the crystal bar process developed by Anton Eduard van Arkel and Jan Hendrik de Boer in 1925. It involves the formation of the metal iodide, in this example vanadium(III) iodide, and the subsequent decomposition to yield pure metal:

2 V + 3 I_{2} ⇌ 2 VI_{3}

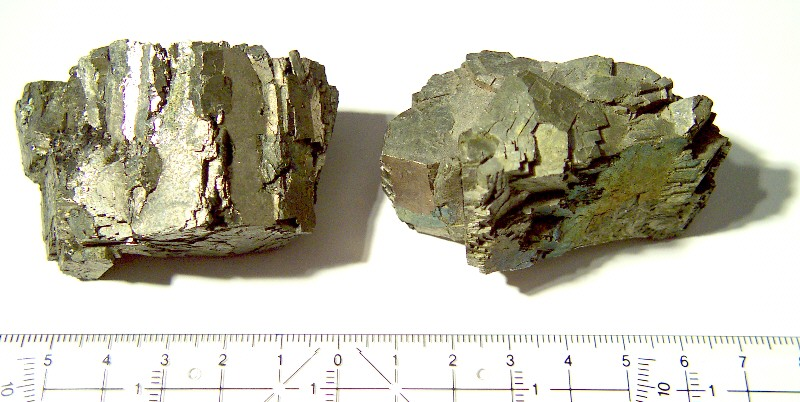
Ferrovanadium chunks

Most vanadium is used as a component of a steel alloy called ferrovanadium. Ferrovanadium is produced directly by reducing a mixture of vanadium oxide, iron oxides and iron in an electric furnace. The vanadium ends up in pig iron produced from vanadium-bearing magnetite. Depending on the ore used, the slag contains up to 25% of vanadium.

Approximately 70000 tonnes of vanadium ore are produced yearly, with 25000 t of vanadium ore being produced in Russia, 24000 in South Africa, 19000 in China, and 1000 in Kazakhstan. 7000 t of vanadium metal are produced each year. It is impossible to obtain vanadium by heating its ore with carbon. Instead, vanadium is produced by heating vanadium oxide with calcium in a pressure vessel. Very high-purity vanadium is produced from a reaction of vanadium trichloride with magnesium.

=== Niobium and tantalum ===
Mine production of niobium (t) (USGS estimate)
Year	Australia	Brazil	Canada
2000	160	30,000	2,290
2001	230	22,000	3,200
2002	290	26,000	3,410
2003	230	29,000	3,280
2004	200	29,900	3,400
2005	200	35,000	3,310
2006	200	40,000	4,167
2007	Unknown	57,300	3,020
2008	Unknown	58,000	4,380
2009	Unknown	58,000	4,330
2010	Unknown	58,000	4,420
2011	Unknown	58,000	4,630
2012	Unknown	63,000	5,000
2013	Unknown	53,100	5,260
2014	Unknown	53,000	5,000
2015	Unknown	58,000	5,750
2016	Unknown	57,000	6,100
2017	Unknown	60,700	6,980
2018	Unknown	59,000	7,700
2019	Unknown	88,900	6,800

After the separation from the other minerals, the mixed oxides of tantalum Ta_{2}O_{5} and niobium Nb_{2}O_{5} are obtained. To produce niobium, the first step in the processing is the reaction of the oxides with hydrofluoric acid:

Ta_{2}O_{5} + 14 HF → 2 H_{2}[TaF_{7}] + 5 H_{2}O
Nb_{2}O_{5} + 10 HF → 2 H_{2}[NbOF_{5}] + 3 H_{2}O

The first industrial scale separation, developed by Swiss chemist de Marignac, exploits the differing solubilities of the complex niobium and tantalum fluorides, dipotassium oxypentafluoroniobate monohydrate (K_{2}[NbOF_{5}]·H_{2}O) and dipotassium heptafluorotantalate (K_{2}[TaF_{7}]) in water. Newer processes use the liquid extraction of the fluorides from aqueous solution by organic solvents like cyclohexanone. The complex niobium and tantalum fluorides are extracted separately from the organic solvent with water and either precipitated by the addition of potassium fluoride to produce a potassium fluoride complex, or precipitated with ammonia as the pentoxide:

H_{2}[NbOF_{5}] + 2 KF → K_{2}[NbOF_{5}]↓ + 2 HF

Followed by:

2 H_{2}[NbOF_{5}] + 10 NH_{4}OH → Nb_{2}O_{5}↓ + 10 NH_{4}F + 7 H_{2}O

Several methods are used for the reduction to metallic niobium. The electrolysis of a molten mixture of K_{2}[NbOF_{5}] and sodium chloride is one; the other is the reduction of the fluoride with sodium. With this method, a relatively high purity niobium can be obtained. In large scale production, Nb_{2}O_{5} is reduced with hydrogen or carbon. In the aluminothermic reaction, a mixture of iron oxide and niobium oxide is reacted with aluminium:

3 Nb_{2}O_{5} + Fe_{2}O_{3} + 12 Al → 6 Nb + 2 Fe + 6 Al_{2}O_{3}

Small amounts of oxidizers like sodium nitrate are added to enhance the reaction. The result is aluminium oxide and ferroniobium, an alloy of iron and niobium used in steel production. Ferroniobium contains between 60 and 70% niobium. Without iron oxide, the aluminothermic process is used to produce niobium. Further purification is necessary to reach the grade for superconductive alloys. Electron beam melting under vacuum is the method used by the two major distributors of niobium.

As of 2013, CBMM from Brazil controlled 85 percent of the world's niobium production. The United States Geological Survey estimates that the production increased from 38,700 tonnes in 2005 to 44,500 tonnes in 2006. Worldwide resources are estimated to be 4.4 million tonnes. During the ten-year period between 1995 and 2005, the production more than doubled, starting from 17,800 tonnes in 1995. Between 2009 and 2011, production was stable at 63,000 tonnes per year, with a slight decrease in 2012 to only 50,000 tonnes per year.

70,000 tonnes of tantalum ore are produced yearly. Brazil produces 90% of tantalum ore, with Canada, Australia, China, and Rwanda also producing the element. The demand for tantalum is around 1,200 tonnes per year.

=== Dubnium and beyond ===
Dubnium is produced synthetically by bombarding actinides with lighter elements. To date, no experiments in a supercollider have been conducted to synthesize the next member of the group, either unpentseptium (Ups) or unpentennium (Upe). As unpentseptium and unpentennium are both late period 8 elements, it is unlikely that these elements will be synthesized in the near future; current attempts have only been made on elements up to atomic number 127.

== Applications ==
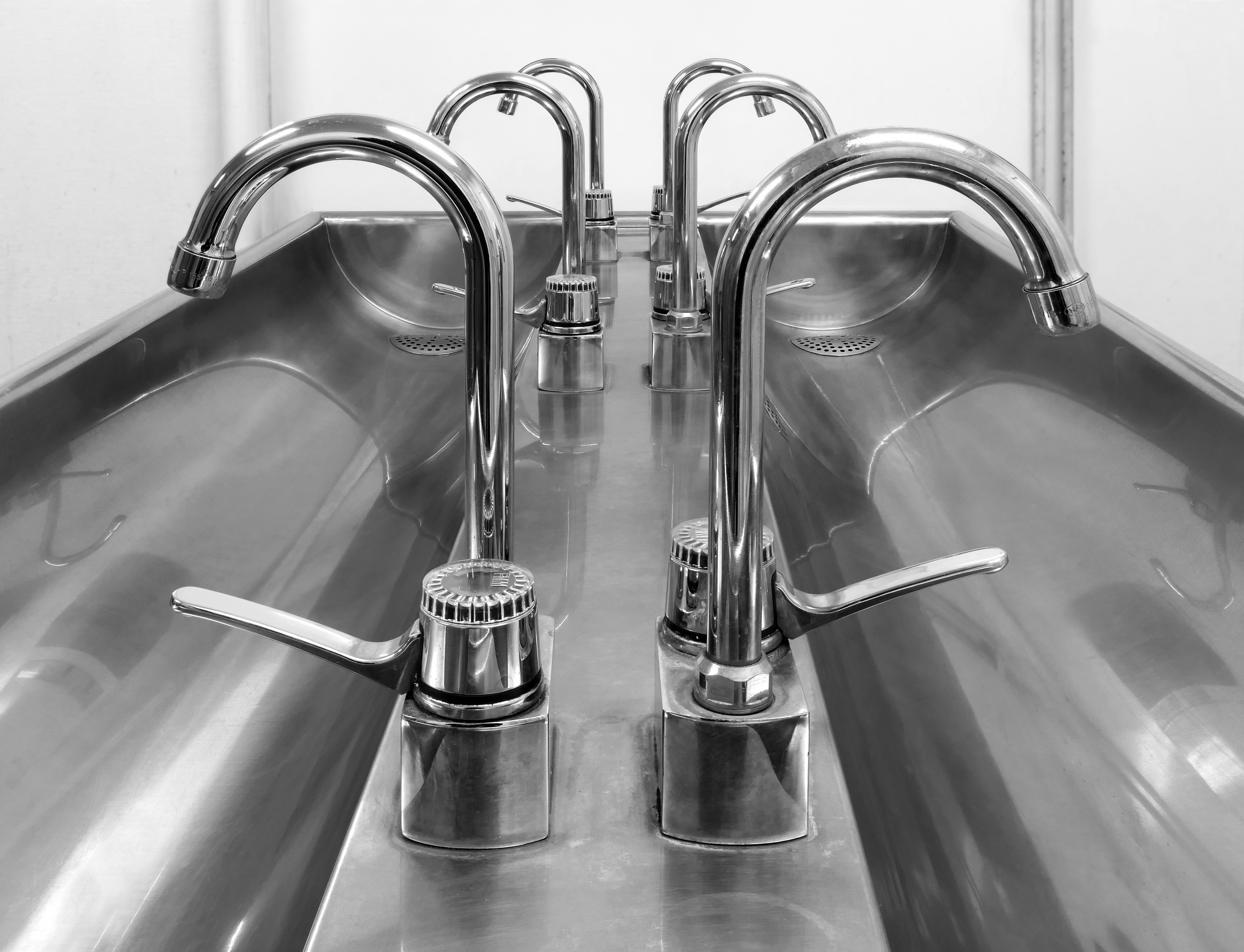
Niobium is often a minor component in stainless steel.

Vanadium's main application is in alloys, such as vanadium steel. Vanadium alloys are used in springs, tools, jet engines, armor plating, and nuclear reactors. Vanadium oxide gives ceramics a golden color, and other vanadium compounds are used as catalysts to produce polymers.

Small amounts of niobium are added to stainless steel to improve its quality. Niobium alloys are also used in rocket nozzles because of niobium's high corrosion resistance.

Tantalum has four main types of applications. Tantalum is added into objects exposed to high temperatures, in electronic devices, in surgical implants, and for handling corrosive substances.

Dubnium has no applications due to the difficulty of its synthesis and the very short half-lives of even its longest-lived isotopes.

== Biological occurrences ==
Out of the group 5 elements, only vanadium has been identified as playing a role in the biological chemistry of living systems, but even it plays a very limited role in biology, and is more important in ocean environments than on land.

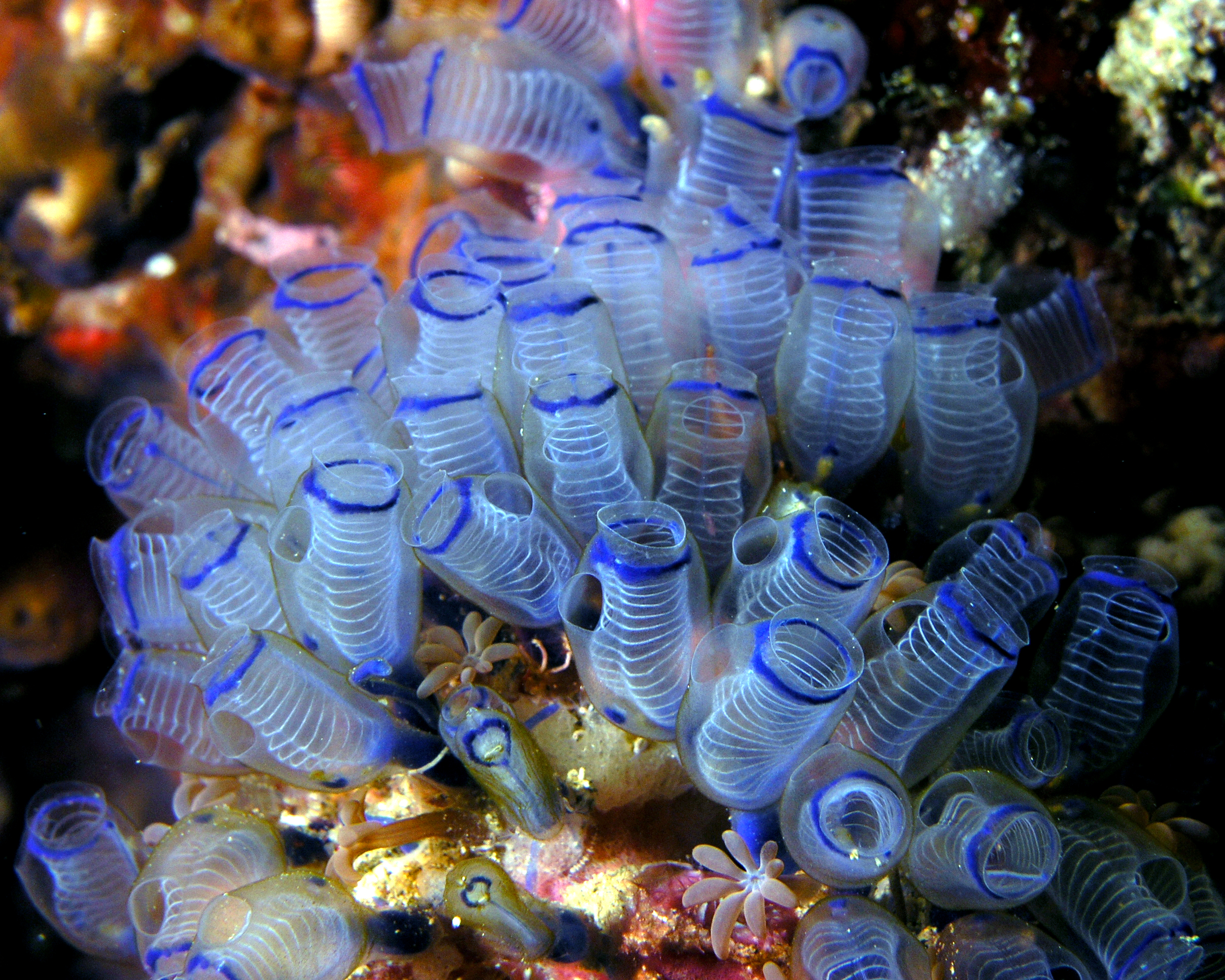
Tunicates such as this bluebell tunicate contain vanadium as vanabins.

Vanadium, essential to ascidians and tunicates as vanabins, has been known in the blood cells of Ascidiacea (sea squirts) since 1911, in concentrations of vanadium in their blood more than 100 times higher than the concentration of vanadium in the seawater around them. Several species of macrofungi accumulate vanadium (up to 500 mg/kg in dry weight). Vanadium-dependent bromoperoxidase generates organobromine compounds in a number of species of marine algae.

Rats and chickens are also known to require vanadium in very small amounts and deficiencies result in reduced growth and impaired reproduction. Vanadium is a relatively controversial dietary supplement, primarily for increasing insulin sensitivity and body-building. Vanadyl sulfate may improve glucose control in people with type 2 diabetes. In addition, decavanadate and oxovanadates are species that potentially have many biological activities and that have been successfully used as tools in the comprehension of several biochemical processes.

== Toxicity and precautions ==
Pure vanadium is not known to be toxic. However, vanadium pentoxide causes severe irritation of the eyes, nose, and throat. Tetravalent VOSO_{4} has been reported to be at least 5 times more toxic than trivalent V_{2}O_{3}. The Occupational Safety and Health Administration has set an exposure limit of 0.05 mg/m^{3} for vanadium pentoxide dust and 0.1 mg/m^{3} for vanadium pentoxide fumes in workplace air for an 8-hour workday, 40-hour work week. The National Institute for Occupational Safety and Health has recommended that 35 mg/m^{3} of vanadium be considered immediately dangerous to life and health, that is, likely to cause permanent health problems or death. Vanadium compounds are poorly absorbed through the gastrointestinal system. Inhalation of vanadium and vanadium compounds results primarily in adverse effects on the respiratory system. Quantitative data are, however, insufficient to derive a subchronic or chronic inhalation reference dose. Other effects have been reported after oral or inhalation exposures on blood parameters, liver, neurological development, and other organs in rats.

There is little evidence that vanadium or vanadium compounds are reproductive toxins or teratogens. Vanadium pentoxide was reported to be carcinogenic in male rats and in male and female mice by inhalation in an NTP study, although the interpretation of the results has recently been disputed. The carcinogenicity of vanadium has not been determined by the United States Environmental Protection Agency. Vanadium traces in diesel fuels are the main fuel component in high temperature corrosion. During combustion, vanadium oxidizes and reacts with sodium and sulfur, yielding vanadate compounds with melting points as low as 530 °C, which attack the passivation layer on steel and render it susceptible to corrosion. The solid vanadium compounds also abrade engine components.

Niobium has no known biological role. While niobium dust is an eye and skin irritant and a potential fire hazard, elemental niobium on a larger scale is physiologically inert (and thus hypoallergenic) and harmless. It is often used in jewelry and has been tested for use in some medical implants. Niobium and its compounds thought to be slightly toxic. Short- and long-term exposure to niobates and niobium chloride, two water-soluble chemicals, have been tested in rats. Rats treated with a single injection of niobium pentachloride or niobates show a median lethal dose (LD_{50}) between 10 and 100 mg/kg. For oral administration the toxicity is lower; a study with rats yielded a LD_{50} after seven days of 940 mg/kg.

Compounds containing tantalum are rarely encountered in the laboratory, and it and its compounds rarely cause injury, and when they do, the injuries are normally rashes. The metal is highly biocompatible and is used for body implants and coatings, therefore attention may be focused on other elements or the physical nature of the chemical compound. People can be exposed to tantalum in the workplace by breathing it in, skin contact, or eye contact. The Occupational Safety and Health Administration (OSHA) has set the legal limit (permissible exposure limit) for tantalum exposure in the workplace as 5 mg/m^{3} over an 8-hour workday. The National Institute for Occupational Safety and Health (NIOSH) has set a recommended exposure limit of 5 mg/m^{3} over an 8-hour workday and a short-term limit of 10 mg/m^{3}. At levels of 2500 mg/m^{3}, tantalum is immediately dangerous to life and health.
