= Niobia =

Niobia may refer to:

- Niobia Bryant, American novelist of romance and mainstream fiction
- Niobia (cnidarian), a genus of cnidarians in the family Niobiidae
- Three forms of niobium oxide:
  - Niobium monoxide (niobium(II) oxide), NbO
  - Niobium dioxide (niobium(IV) oxide), NbO_{2}
  - Niobium pentoxide (niobium(V) oxide), Nb_{2}O_{5}
