= Niobium capacitor =

Electrolytic capacitor

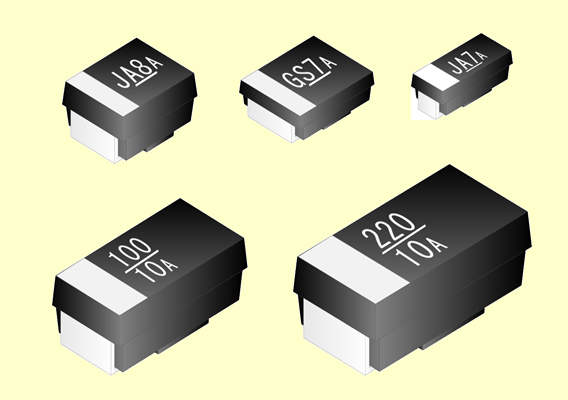
SMD chip style of niobium electrolytic capacitors

A niobium electrolytic capacitor (historically also Columbium capacitor) is an electrolytic capacitor whose anode (+) is made of passivated niobium metal or niobium monoxide, on which an insulating niobium pentoxide layer acts as a dielectric. A solid electrolyte on the surface of the oxide layer serves as the capacitor's cathode (−).

Niobium capacitors are available in SMD packaging and compete with tantalum chip capacitors in certain voltage and capacitance ratings. They are available with a solid manganese dioxide electrolyte.

Like most electrolytic capacitors, niobium capacitors are polarized components. Reverse voltages or ripple currents higher than specified tolerances can destroy the dielectric and thus the capacitor; the resulting short circuit can cause a fire or explosion in larger units.

Niobium capacitors were developed in the United States and the Soviet Union in the 1960s. Since 2002 they have been commercially available in the West, taking advantage of the lower cost and better availability of niobium relative to tantalum.

== Basic information ==
Niobium is a sister metal to tantalum. Niobium has a similar melting point (2744 °C) to tantalum and exhibits similar chemical properties. The materials and processes used to produce niobium-dielectric capacitors are essentially the same as for existing tantalum-dielectric capacitors. However, niobium as a raw material is much more abundant in nature than tantalum and is less expensive. The characteristics of niobium electrolytic capacitors and tantalum electrolytic capacitors are roughly comparable.

Niobium electrolytic capacitors can be made with high purity niobium as the anode but the diffusion of oxygen from the dielectric (Nb_{2}O_{5}) into the niobium anode metal is very high, resulting in leakage current instability or even capacitor failures. There are two possible ways to reduce oxygen diffusion and improve leakage current stability – either by doping metallic niobium powders with nitride into passivated niobium nitride or using niobium oxide (NbO) as anode material. Niobium oxide is a hard ceramic material characterized by high metallic conductivity. Niobium oxide powder can be prepared in a similar structure to that of tantalum powder and can be processed in a similar way to produce capacitors. It also can be oxidized by anodic oxidation (anodizing, forming) to generate the insulating dielectric layer. Thus two types of niobium electrolytic capacitors are marketed, those using a passivated niobium anode and those using a niobium oxide anode. Both types use niobium pentoxide (Nb_{2}O_{5}) as the dielectric layer.

=== Anodic oxidation ===
Diagram illustrating anodic oxidation, in which a metallic anode in an electrolyte forms an oxide layer in response to the application of voltage.

Niobium, similarly to tantalum and aluminum, is a so-called valve metal. Placing such a metal in contact with an electrolytic bath and applying a positive voltage to it forms a layer of electrically insulating oxide whose thickness corresponds to the applied voltage. This oxide layer acts as the dielectric in an electrolytic capacitor.

This property of niobium was known since the beginning of the 20th century. Although niobium is more abundant in nature and less expensive than tantalum, its high melting point of 2744 °C hindered the development of niobium electrolytic capacitors.

In the 1960s, the higher availability of niobium ore compared with tantalum ore prompted research into niobium electrolytic capacitors in the Soviet Union. Here they served the same purpose as tantalum capacitors in the West. With the collapse of the Iron Curtain, the technology became better-known in the West, with major capacitor manufacturers taking interest in the late 1990s. The materials and processes used to produce niobium capacitors are essentially the same as for tantalum capacitors. Rising tantalum prices in 2000 and 2001 encouraged the development of niobium electrolytic capacitors with manganese dioxide and polymer electrolytes, which have been available since 2002.

A dielectric material is placed between two conducting plates (electrodes), each of area A and with a separation of d.

Every electrolytic capacitor can be thought of as a "plate capacitor" whose capacitance increases with the electrode area (A) and the dielectric permittivity (ε), and decreases with the dielectric thickness (d).

$$C = \varepsilon \cdot \frac{A}{d}$$

The dielectric thickness of niobium electrolytic capacitors is very thin, in the range of nanometers per volt. This very thin dielectric layer, combined with a sufficiently high dielectric strength, allows niobium electrolytic capacitors to achieve a high volumetric capacitance comparable to tantalum capacitors.

The niobium anode material is manufactured from a powder sintered into a pellet with a rough surface structure intended to increase the electrode surface area A compared to a smooth surface with the same footprint. This increase in surface area can increase the capacitance by a factor of up to 200 for solid niobium electrolytic capacitors, depending on the rated voltage.

The properties of the niobium pentoxide dielectric layer, compared with a tantalum pentoxide layer, are given in the following table:

Characteristics of the different tantalum and niobium oxide layers
Anode material	Dielectric	Relative permittivity	Oxide structure	Breakdown voltage (V/μm)	Dielectric layer thickness (nm/V)
Tantalum	Tantalum pentoxide Ta_{2}O_{5}	27	amorphous	625	1.6
Niobium or Niobium oxide	Niobium pentoxide Nb_{2}O_{5}	41	amorphous	400	2.5

The higher permittivity and lower breakdown voltage of niobium pentoxide relative to tantalum pentoxide results in niobium capacitors and tantalum capacitors having similar sizes for a given capacitance and a rated voltage.

=== Basic construction of solid niobium electrolytic capacitors ===
Construction of a solid niobium chip capacitor

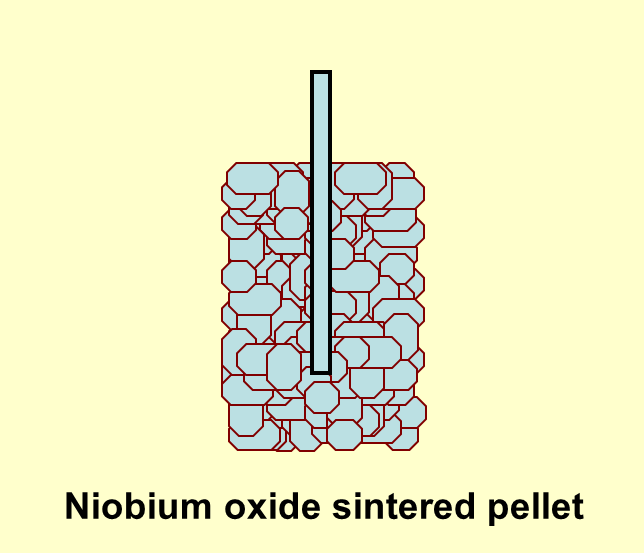
The capacitor cell of a niobium electrolytic capacitor consists of sintered niobium or niobium monoxide powder

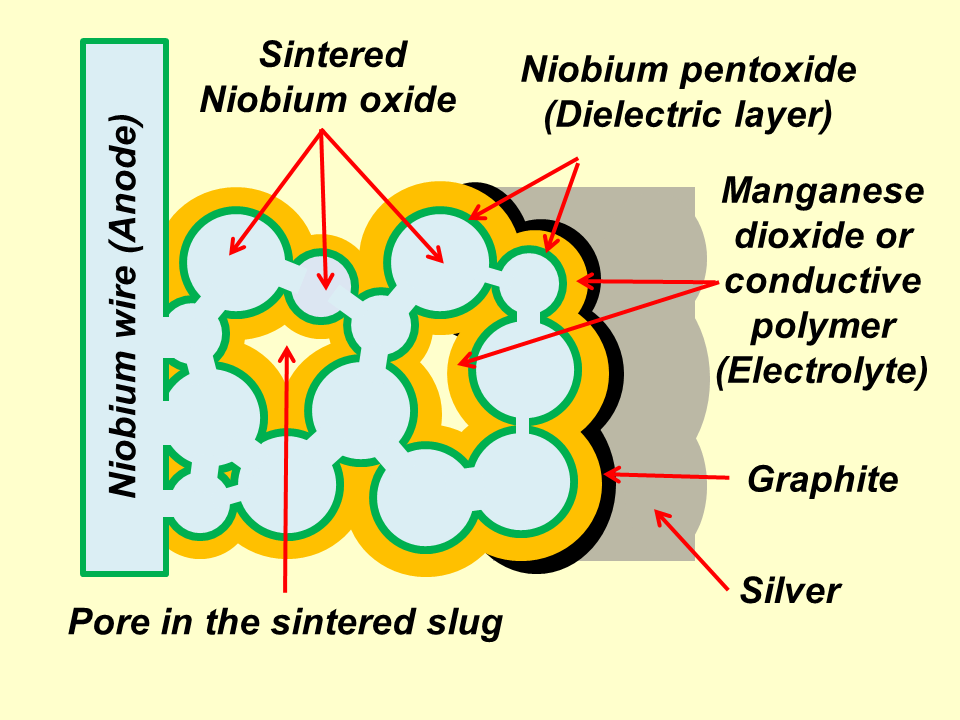
Schematic representation of the structure of a sintered niobium electrolytic capacitor with solid electrolyte and the cathode contacting layers

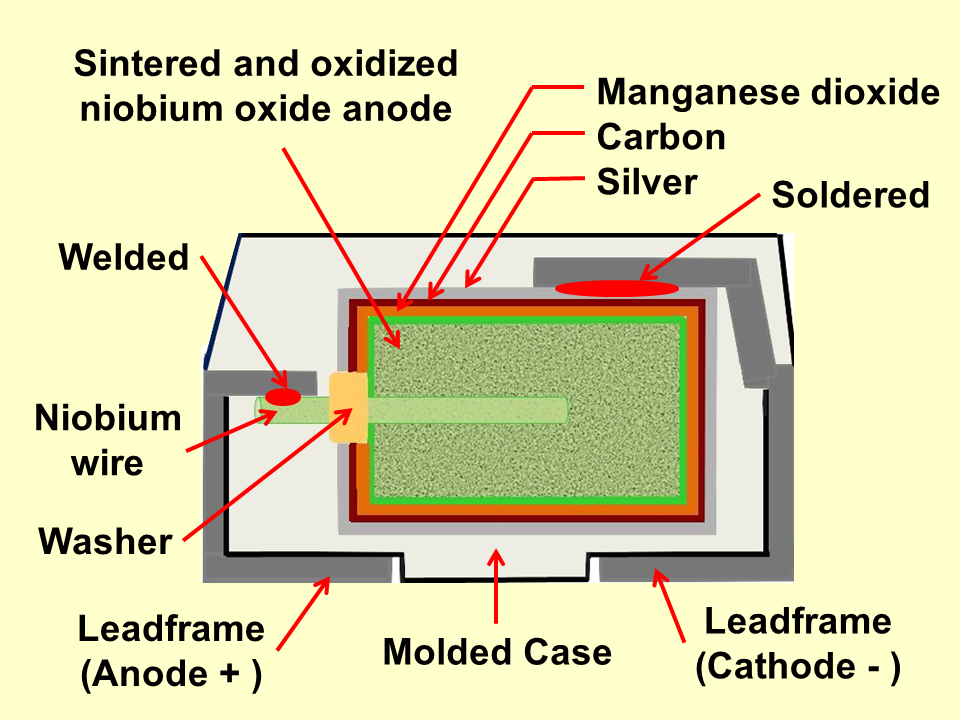
Construction of a typical SMD niobium electrolytic chip capacitor with solid electrolyte

A typical niobium capacitor is a chip capacitor and consists of niobium or niobium oxide powder pressed and sintered into a pellet as the anode of the capacitor, with the oxide layer of niobium pentoxide as dielectric, and a solid manganese dioxide electrolyte as the cathode.

=== Comparison of niobium and tantalum electrolytic capacitor types ===
The combination of anode materials for niobium and tantalum electrolytic capacitors and the electrolytes used has formed a wide variety of capacitor types with different properties. An outline of the main characteristics of the different types is shown in the table below.

Overview of the key features of niobium and tantalum electrolytic capacitors
Electrolytic capacitor family	Electrolyte	Capacitance range (μF)	Max. rated voltage (V)	Max. temperature (°C)
Tantalum electrolytic capacitor, sintered anode	Non-solid, sulfuric acid	0.1...18,000	630	125/200
Tantalum electrolytic capacitor, sintered anode	Solid, manganese dioxide	0.1...3,300	125	125/150
Tantalum electrolytic capacitor, sintered anode	Solid, polymer	10...1,500	25	105
Niobium oxide electrolytic capacitor, sintered anode	Solid, manganese dioxide	1...1,500	10	105
Niobium oxide electrolytic capacitor, sintered anode	Solid, polymer	4.7...470	16	105

Tantalum and niobium electrolytic capacitors with solid electrolyte as surface-mountable chip capacitors are mainly used in electronic devices in which little space is available or a low profile is required. They operate reliably over a wide temperature range without large parameter deviations.

=== Comparison of electrical parameters of niobium and tantalum capacitor types ===
In order to compare the different characteristics of the different electrolytic chip capacitor types, specimens with the same dimensions and of comparable capacitance and voltage are compared in the following table. In such a comparison the values for ESR and ripple current load are the most important parameters for the use of electrolytic capacitors in modern electronic equipment. The lower the ESR the higher the ripple current per volume, thus the better the functionality of the capacitor in the circuit.

Comparison of the most important characteristics of different types of electrolytic chip capacitors
Electrolytic capacitor family	Type ^{1}	Dimension DxL, WxHxL (mm)	Max. ESR 100 kHz, 20 °C (mΩ)	Max. Ripple current 85/105 °C (mA)	Max. Leakage current after 2 Min. ^{2} (μA)
Tantalum capacitors, MnO_{2} electrolyte	Kemet T494 330/10	7.3x4.3x4.0	100	1285	10 (0.01CV)
Tantalum capacitors, Multianode, MnO_{2} electrolyte	Kemet T510 330/10	7.3x4.3x4.0	35	2500	10 (0.01CV)
Tantalum capacitors, Polymer electrolyte	Kemet T543 330/10	7.3x4.3x4.0	10	4900	100 (0.1CV)
Tantalum capacitors, Multianode, polymer	Kemet T530 150/10	7.3x4.3x4.0	5	4970	100 (0.1CV)
Niobium capacitors, MnO_{2} electrolyte	AVX, NOS 220/6,3	7.3x4.3x4.1	80	1461	20 (0.02CV)
Niobium capacitors, Multianode, MnO_{2} electrolyte	AVX, NBM 220/6.3	7.3x4.3x4.1	40	2561	20 (0.02CV)
Niobium-caps Polymer electrolyte	NEC, NMC 100/10	7.3x4.3x2.8	-	-	20 (0.02CV)
Aluminum capacitors, Polymer electrolyte	Panasonic SP-UE 180/6.3	7.3x4.3x4.2	7	3700	100 (0.1CV)
Aluminum capacitors, Polymer electrolyte	Kemet A700 100/10	7.3x4.3x4.0	10	4700	40 (0.04CV)

(1) 100 μF/10 V, unless otherwise specified,

(2) calculated for a capacitor 100 μF/10 V,

== History ==
The phenomenon that can electrochemically form an oxide layer on aluminum and metals like tantalum or niobium, blocking an electric current in one direction but allowing it to flow in the other direction, was discovered in 1875 by the French researcher Eugène Ducretet. He coined the term "valve metal" for such metals. Charles Pollak (born Karol Pollak) used this phenomenon for an idea of a polarized "Electric liquid capacitor with aluminum electrodes". In 1896 Pollak obtained a patent for the first electrolytic capacitor. The first tantalum electrolytic capacitors with wound tantalum foils and non-solid electrolyte were developed in 1930 by Tansitor Electronics Inc., USA, and used for military purposes.

Niobium is a sister metal to tantalum and serves as valve metal generating an oxide layer during anodic oxidation. Niobium as raw material is much more abundant in nature than tantalum and is less expensive. Niobium capacitors were developed in the United States and the former Soviet Union in the late 1960s. It received more use in the Soviet Union as niobium was much more available than tantalum.

Another price explosion for tantalum in 2000/2001 forced the commercial development of niobium electrolytic capacitors with manganese dioxide electrolyte, which became available since 2002. The materials and processes used to produce niobium-dielectric capacitors are essentially the same as for existing tantalum-dielectric capacitors. The characteristics of niobium electrolytic capacitors and tantalum electrolytic capacitors are roughly comparable.

== Electrical characteristics ==
=== Series-equivalent circuit ===
Series-equivalent circuit model of a tantalum capacitor

Niobium electrolytic capacitors as discrete components are not ideal capacitors, they have losses and parasitic inductive parts. All properties can be defined and specified by a series equivalent circuit composed out of an idealized capacitance and additional electrical components which model all losses and inductive parameters of a capacitor. In this series-equivalent circuit the electrical characteristics are defined by:

- C, the capacitance of the capacitor
- R_{leakage}, the resistance representing the leakage current of the capacitor
- R_{ESR}, the equivalent series resistance which summarizes all ohmic losses of the capacitor, usually abbreviated as "ESR"
- L_{ESL}, the equivalent series inductance which is the effective self-inductance of the capacitor, usually abbreviated as "ESL".

Using a series equivalent circuit instead of a parallel equivalent circuit is specified by IEC/EN 60384-1.

=== Capacitance standard values and tolerances ===
The electrical characteristics of niobium electrolytic capacitors depend on structure of the anode and the type of electrolyte. The capacitance value of the capacitor depends on measuring frequency and temperature. The rated capacitance value or nominal value is specified in the data sheets of the manufacturers and is symbolized C_{R} C_{N}. The standardized measuring condition for electrolytic capacitors is an AC measuring method with a frequency of 100/120 Hz. The AC measuring voltage shall not exceed 0,5 V AC-RMS.

The percentage of allowed deviation of the measured capacitance from the rated value is called capacitance tolerance. Electrolytic capacitors are available in different tolerance series, whose values are specified in the E series specified in IEC 60063. For abbreviated marking in tight spaces, a letter code for each tolerance is specified in IEC 60062.

- rated capacitance, E3 series, tolerance ±20%, letter code "M"
- rated capacitance, E6 series, tolerance ±20%, letter code "M"
- rated capacitance, E12 series, tolerance ±10%, letter code "K"

=== Rated and category voltage ===
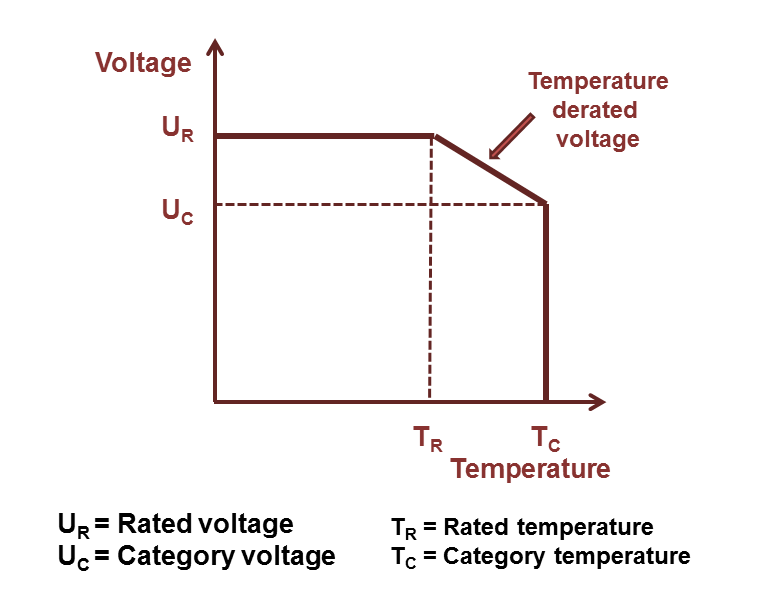
Relation between rated and category voltage and rated and category temperature

Referring to IEC/EN 60384-1 standard the allowed operating voltage for niobium capacitors is called "rated voltage U_{R} " or "nominal voltage U_{N}". The rated voltage U_{R} is the maximum DC voltage or peak pulse voltage that may be applied continuously at any temperature within the rated temperature range T_{R} (IEC/EN 60384-1).

The voltage proof of electrolytic capacitors decreases with increasing temperature. For some applications it is important to use a higher temperature range. Lowering the voltage applied at a higher temperature maintains safety margins. For some capacitor types therefore the IEC standard specifies a "temperature derated voltage" for a higher temperature, the "category voltage U_{C}". The category voltage is the maximum DC voltage or peak pulse voltage that may be applied continuously to a capacitor at any temperature within the category temperature range T_{C}. The relation between both voltages and temperatures is given in the picture right (or above, on mobile devices).

Lower voltage applied may have positive influences for tantalum (and niobium) electrolytic capacitors. Lowering the voltage applied increases the reliability and reduces the expected failure rate.

Applying a higher voltage than specified may destroy electrolytic capacitors.

=== Surge Voltage ===
The surge voltage indicates the maximum peak voltage value that may be applied to electrolytic capacitors during their application for a limited number of cycles. The surge voltage is standardized in IEC/EN 60384-1. For niobium electrolytic capacitors the surge voltage shall be not higher than round 1.3 times of the rated voltage, rounded off to the nearest volt. The surge voltage applied to niobium capacitors may influence the capacitors failure rate.

=== Reverse voltage ===
Like other electrolytic capacitors, niobium electrolytic capacitors are polarized and require the anode electrode voltage to be positive relative to the cathode voltage.

=== Impedance, ESR and dissipation factor, ripple current, leakage current ===
General information to impedance, ESR, dissipation factor tan δ, ripple current, and leakage current see electrolytic capacitor

== Reliability and life time ==
For general information on reliability and failure rate see electrolytic capacitor.

The life time, service life, load life or useful life of electrolytic capacitors is a special characteristic of non-solid electrolytic capacitors, especially non-solid aluminum electrolytic capacitors. Their liquid electrolyte can evaporate over time, leading to wear-out failures. Solid niobium capacitors with manganese dioxide electrolyte have no wear-out mechanism, so the constant failure rate lasts up to the point when all capacitors have failed. They don't have a life time specification like non-solid aluminum electrolytic capacitors.

However, solid polymer niobium electrolytic capacitors do have a life time specification. The electrolyte deteriorates by a thermal degradation mechanism of the conductive polymer. The electrical conductivity decreases, as a function of time, in agreement with a granular structure, in which aging is due to the shrinking of the conductive polymer grains. The life time of polymer electrolytic capacitors is specified in similar terms like non-solid e-caps but its life time calculation follows other rules leading to much longer operational life times.

== Failure modes, self-healing mechanism and application rules ==
The different types of electrolytic capacitors show different behaviors in long-term stability, inherent failure modes and their self-healing mechanisms. Application rules for types with an inherent failure mode are specified to ensure capacitors high reliability and long life.

Long-term electrical behavior, failure modes, self-healing mechanism, and application rules of the different types of electrolytic capacitors
Type of electrolytic capacitors	Long-term electrical behavior	Failure modes	Self-healing mechanism	Application rules
Tantalum e-caps solid MnO_{2} electrolyte	stable	Field crystallization	Thermally induced insulating of faults in the dielectric by decomposition of the electrolyte MnO_{2} into insulating Mn_{2}O_{3} if current availability is limited	Voltage derating 50% Series resistance 3 Ω/V
Tantalum e-caps solid polymer electrolyte	Deterioration of conductivity, ESR increases	Field crystallization	Insulating of faults in the dielectric by oxidation or evaporation of the polymer electrolyte	Voltage derating 20%
Niobium e-caps, solid MnO_{2} electrolyte	stable	no unique determinable	Thermally induced insulation of faults in the dielectric by reduction of Nb_{2}O_{5} into insulating NbO_{2}	niobium anode: voltage derating 50% niobium oxide anode: voltage derating 20%

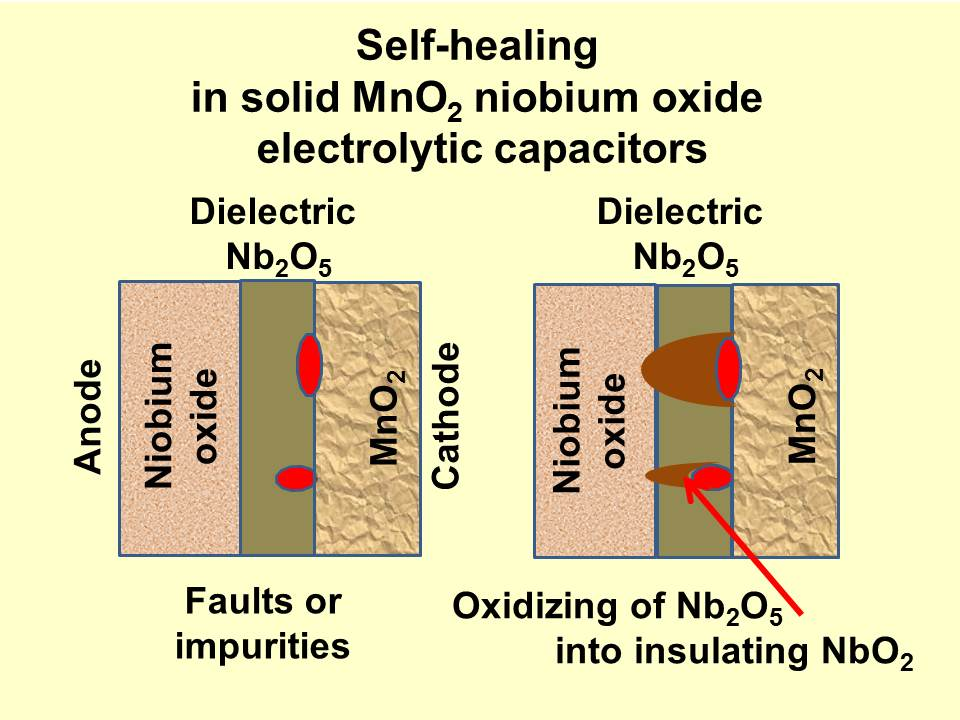
Self-healing in solid niobium capacitors with manganese dioxide electrolyte

A rare failure in solid electrolytic capacitors is breakdown of the dielectric caused by faults or impurities. In niobium electrolytic capacitors the dielectric is niobium pentoxide (Nb_{2}O_{5}). Besides this pentoxide there is an additional niobium suboxide, niobium dioxide (NbO_{2}). The NbO_{2} is a semi-conducting material with a higher conductivity than Nb_{2}O_{5} but much lower than a short. In case of faults or impurities in the dielectric which evokes a partial dielectric breakdown the conducting channel would be effectively isolated by reduction of Nb_{2}O_{5} into high ohmic NbO_{2} if energy is limited.

As more energy is applied to a faulty solid niobium eventually either the high ohmic NbO_{2} channel or the Nb_{2}O_{5} dielectric breaks down and the capacitor exhibits a thermal runaway failure. In comparison to solid tantalum capacitors the thermal runaway of niobium anodes will occur at about three times higher power than of tantalum anodes. This gives a significant reduction (95%) of the ignition failure mode compared to solid tantalum capacitors.

The dielectric layer Nb_{2}O_{5} of solid niobium electrolytic capacitors has a lower breakdown voltage proof than Ta_{2}O_{5} in tantalum capacitors and therefore grows thicker per applied volt and so operates at lower field strength for a given voltage rating with the lower electrical stress the dielectric. In combination with niobium oxide anodes, which are more stable against oxygen diffusion that results in lower voltage derating rules compared with passivated niobium or tantalum anodes.

== Additional information ==
=== Capacitor symbols ===
Electrolytic capacitor symbols

Electrolytic capacitor	Electrolytic capacitor	Electrolytic capacitor

=== Polarity marking ===
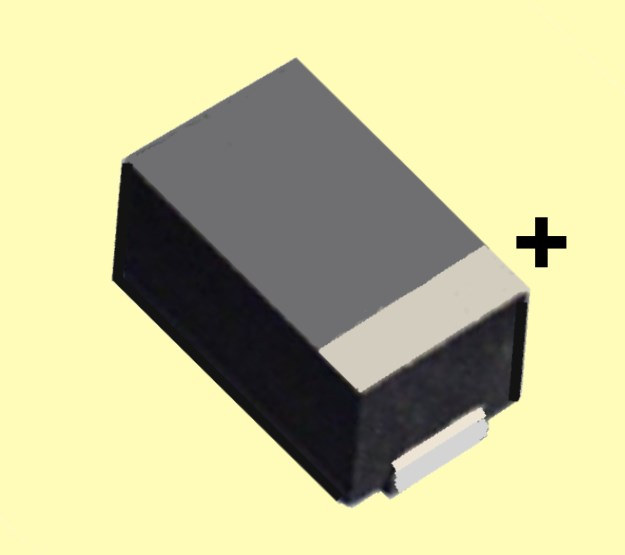
Niobium electrolytic chip capacitors are marked with a bar at the positive component side

Niobium capacitors are in general polarized components, with distinctly marked positive terminals. When subjected to reversed polarity (even briefly), the capacitor depolarizes and the dielectric oxide layer breaks down, which can cause it to fail even when later operated with correct polarity. If the failure is a short circuit (the most common occurrence), and current is not limited to a safe value, catastrophic thermal runaway may occur.

=== Standardization ===
The standardization for all electrical, electronic components and related technologies follows the rules given by the International Electrotechnical Commission (IEC), a non-profit, non-governmental international standards organization. The definition of the characteristics and the procedure of the test methods for capacitors for use in electronic equipment are set out in the generic specification:

- IEC 60384-1, Fixed capacitors for use in electronic equipment – Part 1: Generic specification

Until now (2014) no IEC detail specification for niobium electrolytic capacitors is available.

For electronics manufacturers in the United States the EIA publish a standard for niobium and tantalum chip capacitors:

- EIA-717-A Surface Mount Niobium and Tantalum Capacitor Qualification Specification

=== Features ===
- Niobium capacitors serve as a replacement for tantalum capacitors
- Niobium capacitors are available in SMD style, that makes them suitable for all portable electronic systems with flat design
- Niobium capacitors have no inrush current limitation
- Niobium capacitors are available with solid electrolyte for low ESR applications and stable electrical parameters
- Niobium capacitors have a limited number of manufacturers (AVX and Vishay)

== See also ==
- Types of capacitor
