= Neodymium(III) vanadate =

Names
- Other names Neodymium(III) vanadate(V); Neodymium orthovanadate

Identifiers
CAS Number	86880-89-9 Hydrate; 13721-46-5 Anhydrous
3D model (JSmol)	Interactive image
EC Number	237-290-5
PubChem CID	21909438
- InChI: InChI=1S/Nd.4O.V/q+3;;3*-1; Key: SEEUVPGHIZOZOF-UHFFFAOYSA-N
- SMILES: [O-][V](=O)([O-])[O-].[Nd+3]

Properties
Chemical formula	NdVO_{4}
Molar mass	259.180 g·mol^{−1}
Appearance	gray-silver solid pale blue solid
Density	4.91 g/cm³

Structure
Crystal structure	tetragonal
Space group	I4_{1}/amd (No. 141)
Lattice constant	a = 0.736 nm, b = 0.736 nm, c = 0.6471 nm α = 90°, β = 90°, γ = 90°
Formula units (Z)	4 units per cell

Related compounds
Other anions	Neodymium niobate Neodymium tantalate
Other cations	Praseodymium(III) vanadate Prometium(III) vanadate Samarium(III) vanadate
- Except where otherwise noted, data are given for materials in their standard state (at 25 °C [77 °F], 100 kPa). Infobox references

Neodymium(III) vanadate is an inorganic compound, a salt of neodymium and vanadic acid with the chemical formula NdVO_{4}. It is a paramagnetic solid, pale-blue or silver-gray in appearance. In nanoparticle form it is described as yellow.

== Preparation ==
Neodymium(III) vanadate is produced by the reaction of hot acidic neodymium(III) chloride and sodium orthovanadate:

NdCl_{3} + Na_{3}VO_{4} → NdVO_{4} + 3 NaCl

Nanoparticles can be prepared by treating an ammonium metavanadate (NH_{4}VO_{3}) solution with neodymium nitrate and a capping agent.

== External reading ==
- Новые возможности кристаллов ванадатов с неодимом как активных сред лазеров с диодной накачкой (in Russian)
