= Niobium oxalate =

Niobium(V) hydrogenoxalate
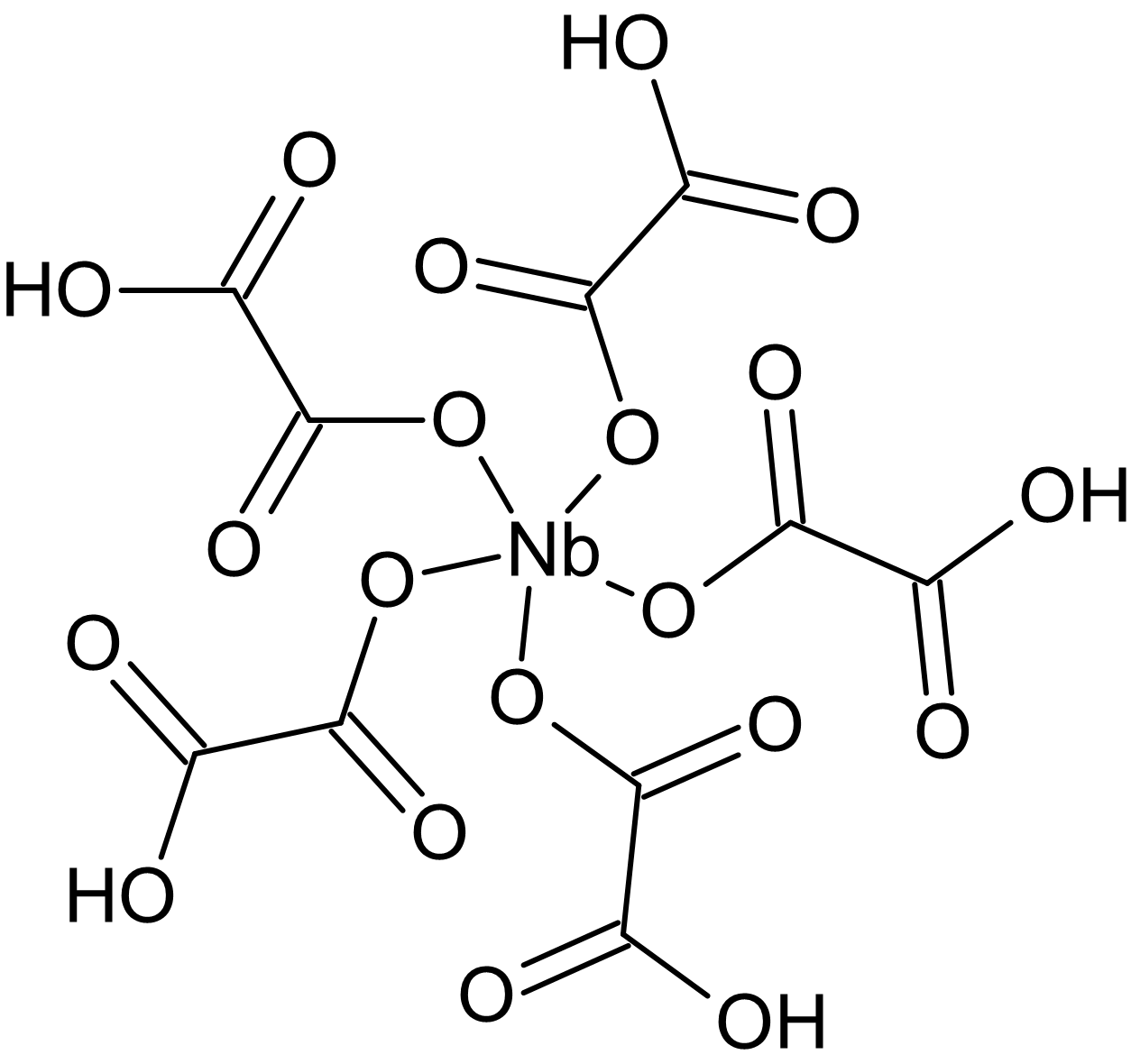

Names
- IUPAC name Niobium(V) 2-hydroxy-2-oxoacetate
- Systematic IUPAC name Niobium(V) 2-hydroxy-2-oxoethanoate
- Other names Niobium oxalate Niobium pentoxalate

Identifiers
CAS Number	149598-62-9; 21348-59-4
3D model (JSmol)	Interactive image
ECHA InfoCard	100.040.295
CompTox Dashboard (EPA)	DTXSID80943906
- InChI: InChI=1S/C2H2O4.Nb/c3-1(4)2(5)6;/h(H,3,4)(H,5,6); Key: XTTKJDYDBXPBDJ-UHFFFAOYSA-N
- SMILES: [Nb].O=C(O)C(=O)O

Properties
Chemical formula	Nb(HC_{2}O_{4})_{5}
Molar mass	538.056
Appearance	colourless monoclinic crystals
Solubility in water	soluble
Solubility	soluble in oxalic acid
- Except where otherwise noted, data are given for materials in their standard state (at 25 °C [77 °F], 100 kPa). Infobox references

Niobium(V) oxalate is the hydrogen oxalate salt of niobium(V). The neutral salt has not been prepared.

== Complexes ==
Niobium(V) can form complexes with hydroxy acids, as well as oxalic acid. The salt formed is more complex than tartaric acid for niobium (as opposed to tantalum). NH_{4}[NbO(C_{2}O_{4})_{2}(H_{2}O)_{2}]·3H_{2}O starts to lose water at 125°C, and at 630°C, it fully decomposes, forming a compound known as niobium pentoxide; Heating this complex and sodium citrate at 650°C can form sodium niobate (NaNbO_{3}).

Rb_{3}[NbO(C_{2}O_{4})_{3}]·2H_{2}O is a colourless crystal, which includes the [NbO(C_{2}O_{4})_{3}]^{3-} anion. Sr_{3}[NbO(C_{2}O_{4})_{3}]_{2}·8H_{2}O is a compound containing the same anion, forming the anhydrous at 200°C, starting to decompose at 260°C, and at 875°C it decomposes to SrCO_{3} and SrNb_{2}O_{6}.
