= Neodymium niobate =

Names
- Other names Neodymium orthoniobate

Identifiers
CAS Number	12034-54-7

Properties
Chemical formula	NdNbO_{4}
Molar mass	301.14 g/mol
Appearance	Crystalline solid
Solubility in water	Insoluble in water

Structure
Crystal structure	Monoclinic, fergusonite type
Space group	I2/a, No. 15
- Except where otherwise noted, data are given for materials in their standard state (at 25 °C [77 °F], 100 kPa). Infobox references

Neodymium niobate is an inorganic compound with the chemical formula NdNbO_{4}. It is a rare-earth niobate containing Nd^{3+} and Nb^{5+}. At room temperature it adopts a monoclinic fergusonite-type structure and undergoes a reversible transition to a tetragonal scheelite-type structure at elevated temperature.

== Preparation ==
Neodymium niobate can be prepared by solid-state reaction of neodymium(III) oxide and niobium(V) oxide:

Nd_{2}O_{3} + Nb_{2}O_{5} → 2 NdNbO_{4}

The reaction is typically carried out at high temperature, commonly between about 1100 and 1400 °C.

Large single crystals of NdNbO_{4} have also been grown from the melt by the Czochralski method. Crystals up to about 20 mm in diameter and 120 mm in length were reported in early growth studies.

== Properties ==
=== Crystal structure ===
At room temperature, NdNbO_{4} has a monoclinic fergusonite-type structure, usually described in space group I2/a, an alternative setting of C2/c (No. 15).

The structure is a monoclinically distorted derivative of the tetragonal scheelite structure. Neodymium is eight-coordinate, while the niobium environment is strongly distorted. Modern diffraction studies describe the Nb site as effectively six-coordinate, with four shorter and two significantly longer Nb–O bonds.

Single crystals are commonly twinned as a consequence of the symmetry-lowering phase transition on cooling from the high-temperature scheelite phase.

=== Phase transition and ferroelasticity ===
NdNbO_{4} undergoes a reversible transition from the monoclinic fergusonite phase to a tetragonal scheelite-type phase in space group I4_{1}/a on heating.

Recent phase-equilibrium work places this transition at about 650 °C.

The low-temperature monoclinic phase is ferroelastic. Early single-crystal work showed characteristic ferroelastic twin boundaries and suggested the existence of an intermediate state during the monoclinic-to-tetragonal transformation.

The transition can also be tuned chemically. Substitution of V^{5+} for Nb^{5+} lowers the fergusonite-to-scheelite transition temperature substantially; for Nd(Nb_{0.8}V_{0.2})O_{4}, it falls to about 400 °C.

=== Dielectric properties ===
NdNbO_{4} is a low-loss microwave dielectric ceramic. Reported properties for dense material include a relative permittivity of approximately 19.6, a quality-factor product Q × f of about 33,000 GHz, and a temperature coefficient of resonant frequency of approximately −24 ppm/°C.

Because of these properties, NdNbO_{4}-based solid solutions are studied as dielectric resonator ceramics for microwave and millimetre-wave applications.
