= Tantalate =

Group of chemical compounds

A tantalate is a tantalum-containing anion or a salt of such an anion. A commercially important example is heptafluorotantalate (TaF_{7}^{2−}) and its potassium salt (K_{2}TaF_{7}).

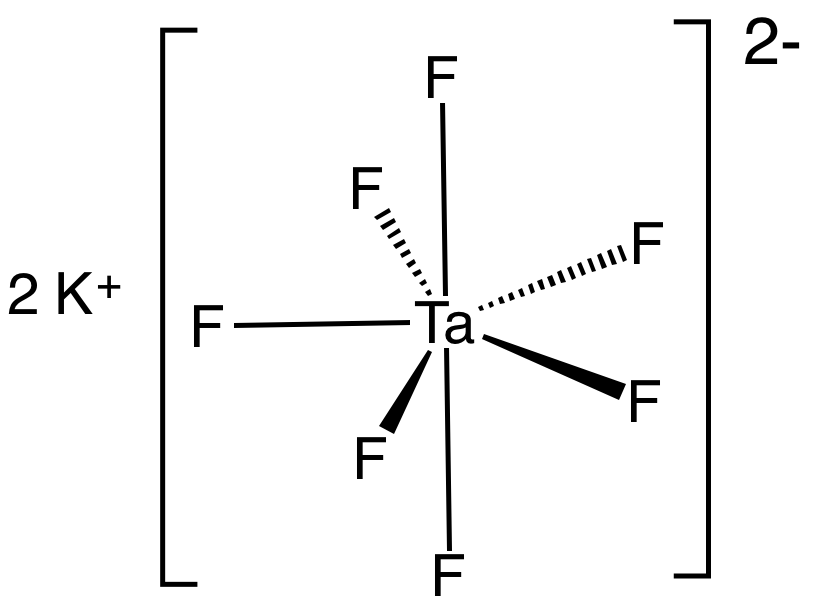
Potassium heptafluorotantalate.

Many oxides of tantalum are called tantalates. They are viewed as derivatives of "tantalic acid", hypothetic compounds with the formulas Ta_{2}O_{5}·nH_{2}O or HTaO_{3}). Examples of such tantalates are lithium tantalate (LiTaO_{3}), lutetium tantalate (LuTaO_{4}), neodymium tantalate (NdTaO_{4}) and lead scandium tantalate (PST or Pb(Sc_{x}Ta_{1-x})O_{3}. Polyoxometallates containing tantalum provide examples of discrete tantalum oxides that exist in solution.
