= Potassium heptafluoroniobate =

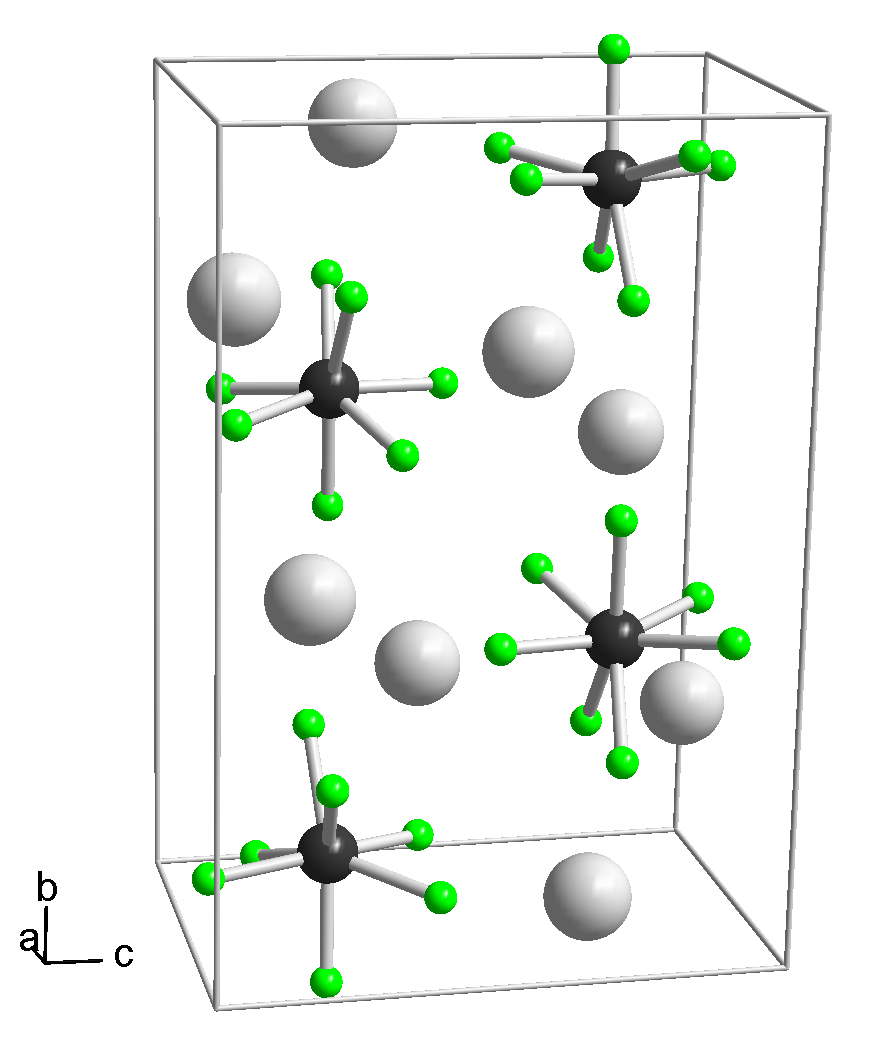

Names
- IUPAC name Dipotassium heptafluoroniobium

Identifiers
CAS Number	16924-03-1
3D model (JSmol)	Interactive image
ChemSpider	26470453
ECHA InfoCard	100.037.246
EC Number	240-987-7
PubChem CID	44890706
CompTox Dashboard (EPA)	DTXSID30276574
- InChI: InChI=1S/7FH.2K.Nb/h7*1H;;;/q;;;;;;;2*+1;+5/p-7 Key: FTPUNAWAGWERLA-UHFFFAOYSA-G
- SMILES: F[Nb-2](F)(F)(F)(F)(F)F.[K+].[K+]

Properties
Chemical formula	F_{7}K_{2}Nb
Molar mass	304.0918 g·mol^{−1}
Appearance	white solid
Melting point	735 °C (1,355 °F; 1,008 K)
- Except where otherwise noted, data are given for materials in their standard state (at 25 °C [77 °F], 100 kPa). Infobox references

Potassium heptafluoroniobate is the inorganic compound with the formula K_{2}NbF_{7}. A white water-soluble salt, it is one of the more important fluorides of niobium. It is often invoked as an intermediate in the separation of niobium from tantalum. These two elements are generally found together in ores (e.g. columbite) and their separation presents a challenge since they form very similar compounds. The basis of their separation hinges on the stability and solubility of the fluorides and oxyfluorides. Reduction of this salt gives niobium metal.

== Synthesis and structure ==
The salt is prepared by dissolving niobium pentoxide in a solution of potassium bifluoride in 40% hydrofluoric acid:

Nb_{2}O_{5} + 4 KHF_{2} + 6 HF → 2K_{2}NbF_{7} + 5 H_{2}O

Potassium heptafluoroniobate and potassium heptafluorotantalate are isostructural. The anion has approximate C_{2v} symmetry, being a face-capped trigonal prism. The Nb-F distances fall in the range 1.940–1.978 Å.

Spectroscopic measurements indicate that the heptafluoride converts to the hexafluoride in solution.
