= Neodymium tantalate =

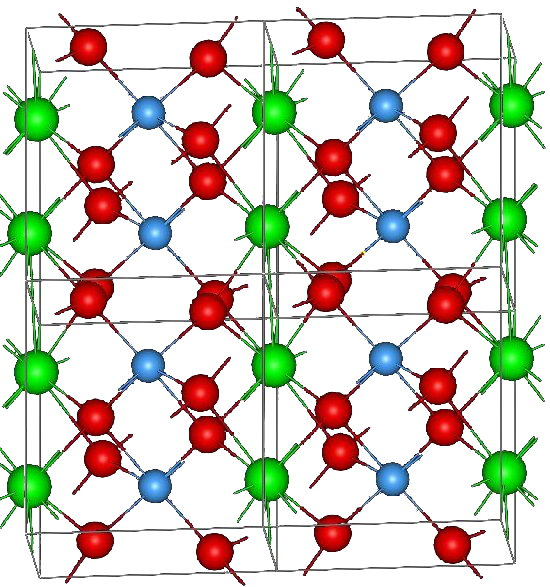
- The structure of Neodymium tanatalate. Atoms are: O(red), Ta(blue) and Nd(green)

Identifiers
CAS Number	12344-26-2
3D model (JSmol)	Interactive image
PubChem CID	157362626
- InChI: InChI=1S/Nd.4O.Ta/q+3;4*-2;+5 Key: BIUUBSDKMPQKED-UHFFFAOYSA-N
- SMILES: [O-2].[O-2].[O-2].[O-2].[Nd+3].[Ta+5]

Properties
Chemical formula	NdTaO_{4}
Molar mass	389.19
Appearance	gray-purple solid
- Except where otherwise noted, data are given for materials in their standard state (at 25 °C [77 °F], 100 kPa). Infobox references

Neodymium tantalate is an inorganic compound with the chemical formula NdTaO_{4}. It is prepared by reacting neodymium oxide and tantalum pentoxide at 1200 °C. It reacts with a mixture of tantalum pentoxide and chlorine gas at high temperature to obtain Nd_{2}Ta_{2}O_{7}Cl_{2}. It is ammonolyzed at high temperature to obtain oxynitrides of Nd-Ta.

== Properties ==
Neodymium tantalate forms violet crystals of the monoclinic system, with space group I2/a, unit cell dimensions a = 0.55153 nm, b = 1.12388 nm, c = 0.51184 nm, β = 95.731°, with formulas per unit cell Z = 4.

There is a metastable high-pressure phase of the monoclinic system, space group P2_{1}/c, cell parameters a = 0.75920 nm, b = 0.54673 nm, c = 0.77022 nm, β = 100.032°, Z = 4.

Neodymium tantalate is insoluble in water.

== See also ==
- Neodymium
- Tantalum
- Tantalate
