= Niobium monoxide =

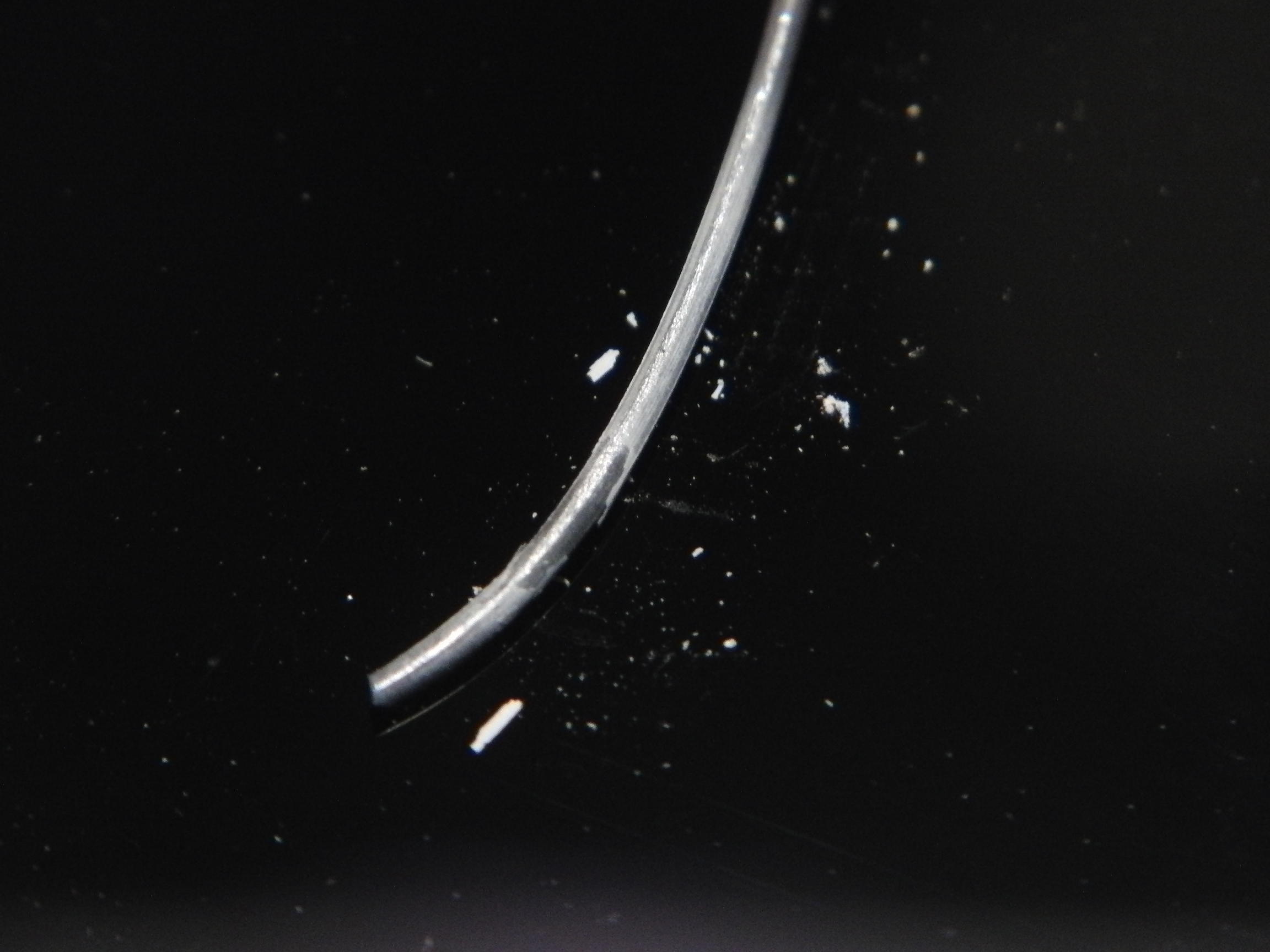

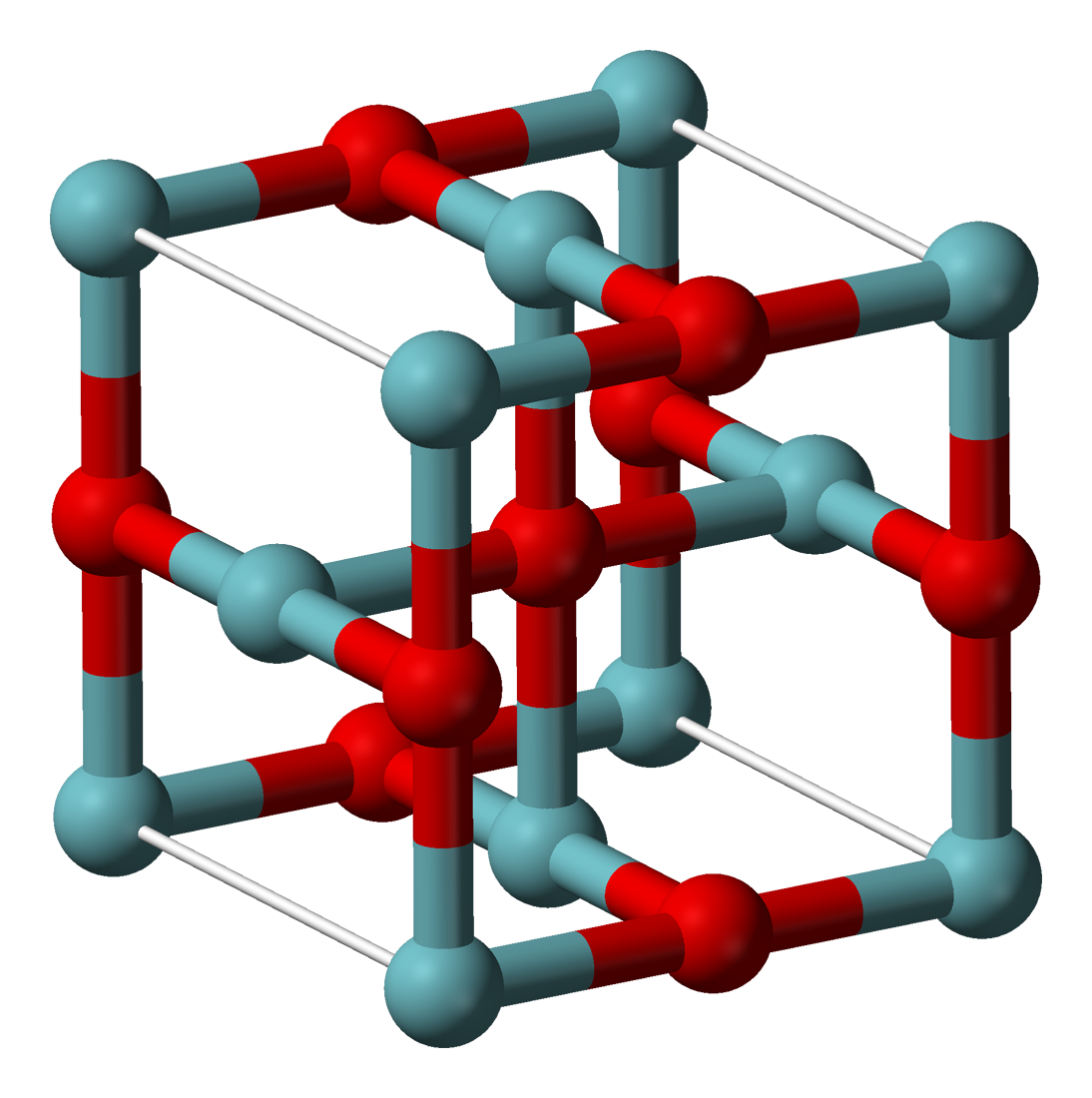

Names
- Other names niobium(II) oxide

Identifiers
CAS Number	12034-57-0
3D model (JSmol)	Interactive image
ChemSpider	74751
ECHA InfoCard	100.031.631
PubChem CID	82838
CompTox Dashboard (EPA)	DTXSID101014241
- InChI: InChI=1S/Nb.O Key: BFRGSJVXBIWTCF-UHFFFAOYSA-N
- SMILES: O=[Nb]

Properties
Chemical formula	NbO
Molar mass	108.905 g/mol
Appearance	grey solid
Odor	odorless
Density	7.30 g/cm^{3}
Melting point	1,937 °C (3,519 °F; 2,210 K)
Solubility	slightly soluble in HCl insoluble in nitric acid

Structure
Crystal structure	Cubic, cP6
Space group	Pm3̅m, No. 221
Lattice constant	a = 0.4211 nm
Formula units (Z)	3

Thermochemistry
Heat capacity (C)	41.3 J/(mol·K)
Std molar entropy (S^{⦵}_{298})	48.1 J/(mol·K)
Std enthalpy of formation (Δ_{f}H^{⦵}_{298})	−405.85 kJ/mol
Gibbs free energy (Δ_{f}G^{⦵})	−378.6 kJ/mol

Hazards
- GHS labelling
Pictograms	(GHS07: Exclamation mark)
Signal word	Warning
Hazard statements	H315, H319, H335
Precautionary statements	P261, P264, P264+P265, P271, P280, P302+P352, P304+P340, P305+P351+P338, P319, P321, P332+P317, P337+P317, P362+P364, P403+P233, P405, P501
- Except where otherwise noted, data are given for materials in their standard state (at 25 °C [77 °F], 100 kPa). verify (what is ?) Infobox references

Niobium monoxide is the inorganic compound with the formula NbO. It is a grey solid with metallic conductivity.

== Structure and electronic properties ==
NbO adopts an unusual cubic structure, similar to the rock salt structure but with some missing atoms compared to it, so that both niobium and oxygen atoms have square planar coordination geometries. The niobium centers are arranged in octahedra, and there is a structural similarity to the octahedral niobium clusters in lower halides of niobium. In NbO the Nb–Nb bond length is 298 pm which compares to 285 pm in the metal. One study of the bonding concludes that strong and nearly covalent bonds exist between the metal centers.

It is a superconductor with a transition temperature of 1.38 K. It is used in capacitors where a layer of Nb_{2}O_{5} is formed around NbO grains as the dielectric.

== Preparation ==
NbO can be prepared by reduction of Nb_{2}O_{5} by hydrogen. More typically, it is prepared by comproportionation:

Nb_{2}O_{5} + 3 Nb → 5 NbO

== Cited sources ==
- Haynes, William M., ed. (2016). CRC Handbook of Chemistry and Physics (97th ed.). Boca Raton, Florida: CRC Press. ISBN 9781498754293.
