= Niobium dioxide =

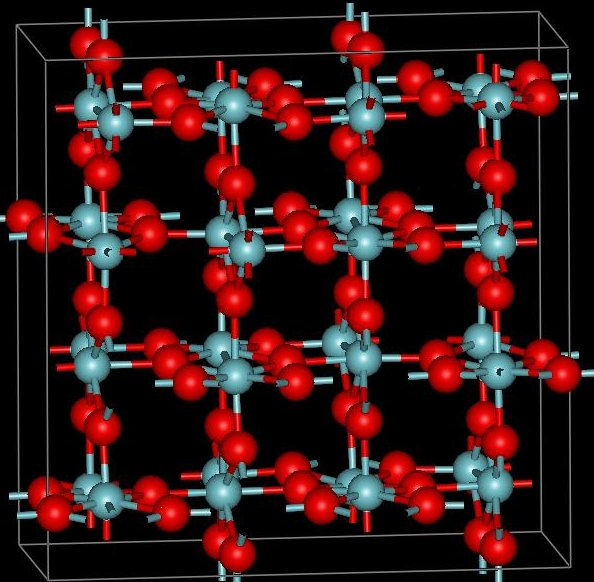

Names
- IUPAC name niobium(IV) oxide, niobium dioxide
- Other names niobium(IV) oxide, columbium dioxide

Identifiers
CAS Number	12034-59-2
3D model (JSmol)	Interactive image
ChemSpider	74752
ECHA InfoCard	100.031.632
EC Number	234-809-7
PubChem CID	82839
CompTox Dashboard (EPA)	DTXSID90893180
- InChI: Key: HFLAMWCKUFHSAZ-UHFFFAOYSA-N; InChI=1S/Nb.2O
- SMILES: O=[Nb]=O

Properties
Chemical formula	NbO_{2}
Molar mass	124.91 g/mol
Appearance	bluish black solid
Melting point	1,915 °C (3,479 °F; 2,188 K)

Structure
Crystal structure	Tetragonal, tI96
Space group	I4_{1}/a, No. 88

Hazards
- GHS labelling
Pictograms	(GHS07: Exclamation mark)
Signal word	Warning
Hazard statements	H315, H319, H335, H413
Precautionary statements	P261, P264, P264+P265, P271, P273, P280, P302+P352, P304+P340, P305+P351+P338, P319, P321, P332+P317, P337+P317, P362+P364, P403+P233, P405, P501
- Except where otherwise noted, data are given for materials in their standard state (at 25 °C [77 °F], 100 kPa). verify (what is ?) Infobox references

Niobium dioxide, is the chemical compound with the formula NbO_{2}. It is a bluish-black non-stoichiometric solid with a composition range of NbO_{1.94}-NbO_{2.09}. It can be prepared by reducing Nb_{2}O_{5} with H_{2} at 800–1350 °C. An alternative method is reaction of Nb_{2}O_{5} with Nb powder at 1100 °C.

== Properties ==
The room temperature form of NbO_{2} has a tetragonal, rutile-like structure with short Nb-Nb distances, indicating Nb-Nb bonding. The high temperature form also has a rutile-like structure with short Nb-Nb distances. Two high-pressure phases have been reported: one with a rutile-like structure (again, with short Nb-Nb distances); and a higher pressure with baddeleyite-related structure.

NbO_{2} is insoluble in water and is a powerful reducing agent, reducing carbon dioxide to carbon and sulfur dioxide to sulfur. In an industrial process for the production of niobium metal, NbO_{2} is produced as an intermediate, by the hydrogen reduction of Nb_{2}O_{5}. The NbO_{2} is subsequently reacted with magnesium vapor to produce niobium metal.
