= Niobium pentoxide =

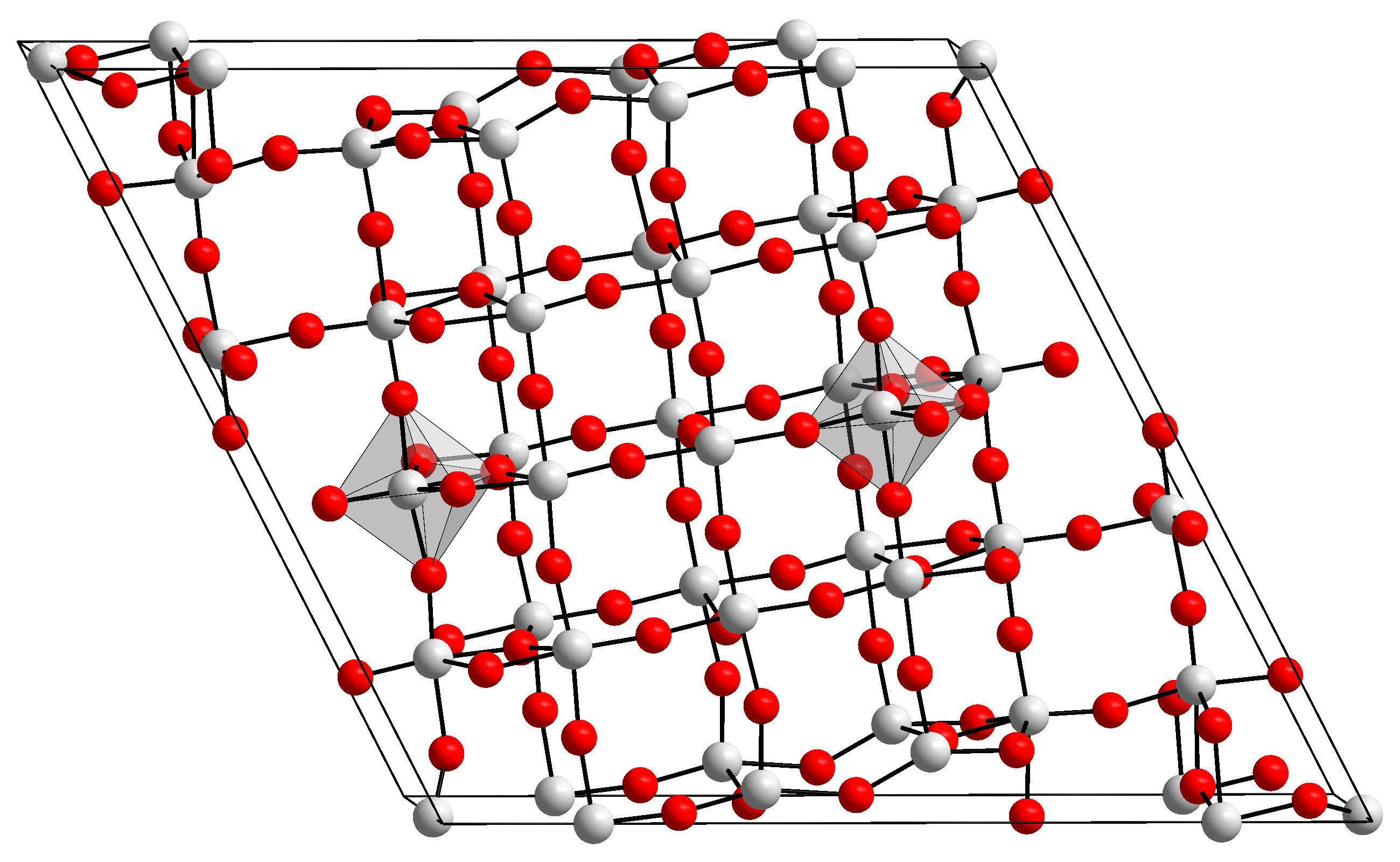

Names
- IUPAC name Niobium(V) oxide
- Other names Niobium pentoxide

Identifiers
CAS Number	1313-96-8
3D model (JSmol)	Interactive image
ChemSpider	109722
ECHA InfoCard	100.013.831
EC Number	215-213-6
PubChem CID	9903420
UNII	K9343U17IN
CompTox Dashboard (EPA)	DTXSID20893850
- InChI: InChI=1S/2Nb.5O Key: ZKATWMILCYLAPD-UHFFFAOYSA-N
- SMILES: O=[Nb](=O)O[Nb](=O)=O

Properties
Chemical formula	Nb_{2}O_{5}
Molar mass	265.81 g/mol
Appearance	white orthogonal solid
Density	4.60 g/cm^{3}
Melting point	1,512 °C (2,754 °F; 1,785 K)
Solubility in water	insoluble
Solubility	soluble in HF
Magnetic susceptibility (χ)	−10·10^{−6} cm^{3}/mol

Hazards
- GHS labelling
Pictograms	(GHS07: Exclamation mark)
Signal word	Warning
Hazard statements	H315, H319, H335
Precautionary statements	P261, P264, P264+P265, P271, P280, P302+P352, P304+P340, P305+P351+P338, P319, P321, P332+P317, P337+P317, P362+P364, P403+P233, P405, P501
- Except where otherwise noted, data are given for materials in their standard state (at 25 °C [77 °F], 100 kPa). verify (what is ?) Infobox references

Niobium pentoxide is the inorganic compound with the formula Nb_{2}O_{5}. A colorless, insoluble, and fairly unreactive solid, it is the most widespread precursor for other compounds and materials containing niobium. It is predominantly used in alloying, with other specialized applications in capacitors, optical glasses, and the production of lithium niobate.

== Structure ==
It has many polymorphic forms all based largely on octahedrally coordinated niobium atoms. The polymorphs are identified with a variety of prefixes. The form most commonly encountered is monoclinic H-Nb_{2}O_{5}, which has a complex structure with a unit cell containing 28 niobium atoms and 70 oxygen, where 27 of the niobium atoms are octahedrally coordinated and one tetrahedrally. There is an uncharacterised solid hydrate, Nb_{2}O_{5}·nH_{2}O, the so-called niobic acid (previously called columbic acid), which can be prepared by hydrolysis of a basic solution of niobium pentachloride or Nb_{2}O_{5} dissolved in HF.

Molten niobium pentoxide has lower mean coordination numbers than the crystalline forms, with a structure comprising mostly NbO_{5} and NbO_{6} polyhedra.

== Production ==
Niobium oxide is obtain from its ores, typically tantalite and columbite, by hydrometallurgy. The process begins with a leaching step; in which the ore is treated with hydrofluoric acid and sulfuric acid to produce water-soluble hydrogen fluorides, such as the heptafluoroniobate. An idealized equation for the process is:

MNb_{2}O_{6} + 16 HF → 2 H_{2}[NbF_{7}] + MF_{2} + 6 H_{2}O (M = Ca, Fe, Mn, etc)

The tantalum and niobium hydrogenfluorides are then removed from the aqueous solution by liquid-liquid extraction into organic solvents, such as cyclohexanone or methyl isobutyl ketone. This step allows the simple removal of various metal impurities (e.g. iron and manganese) which remain in the aqueous phase in the form of fluorides. Separation of the tantalum and niobium is then achieved by pH adjustment. Niobium requires a higher level of acidity to remain soluble in the organic phase and can hence be selectively removed by extraction into less acidic water.

=== Hydrolysis ===
Nb_{2}O_{5} is prepared by hydrolysis of alkali-metal niobates, alkoxides or fluoride using base. Such ostensibly simple procedures afford hydrated oxides that can then be calcined. Pure Nb_{2}O_{5} can also be prepared by hydrolysis of NbCl_{5}:

2 NbCl_{5} + 5 H_{2}O → Nb_{2}O_{5} + 10 HCl

A method of production via sol-gel techniques has been reported hydrolysing niobium alkoxides in the presence of acetic acid, followed by calcination of the gels to produce the orthorhombic form, T-Nb_{2}O_{5}.

=== Oxidation ===
Given that Nb_{2}O_{5} is the most common and robust compound of niobium, many methods, both practical and esoteric, exist for its formation. The oxide for example, arises when niobium metal is oxidised in air. The oxidation of niobium dioxide, NbO_{2} in air forms the polymorph, L-Nb_{2}O_{5}.

== Reactions ==
Nb_{2}O_{5} is attacked by HF and dissolves in fused alkali.

=== Reduction to the metal ===
The conversion of Nb_{2}O_{5} is the main route for the industrial production of niobium metal. In the 1980s, about 15,000,000 kg of Nb_{2}O_{5} were consumed annually for reduction to the metal. The main method is reduction of this oxide with aluminium:

3 Nb_{2}O_{5} + 10 Al → 6 Nb + 5 Al_{2}O_{3}

An alternative but less practiced route involves carbothermal reduction, which proceeds via reduction with carbon and forms the basis of the two stage Balke process:

Nb_{2}O_{5} + 7 C → 2 NbC + 5 CO (heated under vacuum at 1800 °C)
5 NbC + Nb_{2}O_{5} → 7 Nb + 5 CO

=== Conversion to halides ===
Many methods are known for conversion of Nb_{2}O_{5} to the halides. The main problem is incomplete reaction to give the oxyhalides. In the laboratory, the conversion can be effected with thionyl chloride:

Nb_{2}O_{5} + 5 SOCl_{2} → 2 NbCl_{5} + 5 SO_{2}

Nb_{2}O_{5} reacts with CCl_{4} to give niobium oxychloride NbOCl_{3}.

=== Conversion to niobates ===
Treating Nb_{2}O_{5} with aqueous NaOH at 200 °C can give crystalline sodium niobate, NaNbO_{3} whereas the reaction with KOH may yield soluble Lindqvist-type hexaniobates, Nb_{6}O^{8−}_{19}. Lithium niobates such as LiNbO_{3} and Li_{3}NbO_{4} can be prepared by reaction lithium carbonate and Nb_{2}O_{5}.

=== Conversion to reduced niobium oxides ===
High temperature reduction with H_{2} gives NbO_{2}:

Nb_{2}O_{5} + H_{2} → 2 NbO_{2} + H_{2}O

Niobium monoxide arises from a comproportionation using an arc-furnace:

Nb_{2}O_{5} + 3Nb → 5 NbO

The burgundy-coloured niobium(III) oxide, one of the first superconducting oxides, can be prepared again by an comproportionation:

Li_{3}NbO_{4} + 2 NbO → 3 LiNbO_{2}

== Uses ==
Niobium pentoxide is used mainly in the production of niobium metal, but specialized applications exist in the production of optical glasses and lithium niobate.

Thin films of Nb_{2}O_{5} form the dielectric layers in niobium electrolytic capacitors.

Nb_{2}O_{5} have been considered for use as an anode in a lithium-ion battery, given that their ordered crystalline structure allows charging speeds of 225 mAh g^{−1} at 200 mA g^{−1} across 400 cycles, at a Coulombic efficiency of 99.93%.
