= 1932 United States presidential election =

Election of Franklin D. Roosevelt

- November 8, 1932

531 members of the Electoral College 266 electoral votes needed to win
- Turnout: 56.8% (▼0.1 pp)

Nominee	Franklin D. Roosevelt	Herbert Hoover
Party	Democratic	Republican
Home state	New York	California
Running mate	John Nance Garner	Charles Curtis
Electoral vote	472	59
States carried	42	6
Popular vote	22,821,277	15,761,254
Percentage	57.4%	39.6%
- Presidential election results map. Blue denotes those won by Roosevelt/Garner, red denotes states won by Hoover/Curtis. Numbers indicate the number of electoral votes allotted to each state.
President before election
Herbert Hoover
Republican
Elected President
Franklin D. Roosevelt
Democratic

A presidential election was held in the United States on November 8, 1932. Against the backdrop of the Great Depression, the Republican ticket of President Herbert Hoover and Vice President Charles Curtis were defeated, in a landslide, by the Democratic ticket of Franklin D. Roosevelt, the governor of New York, and John Nance Garner, the speaker of the House. This realigning election marked the effective end of the Fourth Party System, which had been dominated by Republicans, and the beginning of an era of Democratic dominance under the New Deal coalition.

Despite disastrous economic conditions due to the Great Depression, Hoover faced little opposition at the 1932 Republican National Convention. Roosevelt was widely considered the front-runner at the start of the 1932 Democratic National Convention, but was not able to clinch the nomination until the fourth ballot of the convention. The Democratic convention chose a leading Southern Democrat, Speaker of the House John Nance Garner of Texas, as the party's vice presidential nominee. Roosevelt united the party, campaigning on the failures of the Hoover administration. He promised recovery with a "New Deal" for the American people.

Roosevelt won by a landslide in both the electoral college and popular vote, carrying every state outside of the Northeast and receiving the highest percentage of the popular vote of any Democratic nominee up to that time. Hoover had won over 58% of the popular vote in the 1928 presidential election, but his share of the popular vote evaporated to just 39.6% in 1932; he failed to win any state south of Delaware or west of Pennsylvania. Socialist Party nominee Norman Thomas won 2.2% of the popular vote. Subsequent Democratic landslides in the 1934 midterm elections and the 1936 presidential election confirmed the commencement of the Fifth Party System, which was largely dominated by Roosevelt's Democratic New Deal Coalition.

Roosevelt's election ended the era of Republican dominance in presidential politics that had lasted since the beginning of the Civil War and the election of 1860 and began 20 years of presidential control for the Democratic Party and 20 years in opposition for the Republican Party; the two decades of uninterrupted Democratic control of the presidency remains the longest such streak by a single party in American history (the Republican Party won more consecutive elections from the aforementioned 1860 election to 1880, but their tenure in the White House was interrupted by the ascendency of Democrat Andrew Johnson to the presidency). Republicans would not reclaim the White House until 1952.

Roosevelt was the first Democrat to be elected president since 1916, the first to win an outright majority of the popular vote since 1876, and the first to win a majority of both the electoral and popular vote since 1852. Hoover was the only incumbent president to lose an election between 1912 and 1976, and the only elected incumbent to do so between 1912 and 1980.

== Background ==
Herbert Hoover, the incumbent president in 1932, whose term expired on March 4, 1933

Republican nominee Herbert Hoover had won in the 1928 presidential election against Democratic nominee Al Smith. Smith had lost the support of the Solid South during the campaign likely due to anti-Catholic sentiment. Hoover had won in a landslide with him winning forty of the forty-eight states giving him 444 electoral votes against Smith's 87. However, the Wall Street Crash of 1929 and the Great Depression weakened the power of the Republicans. In the 1930 elections, the Democrats gained control of the United States House of Representatives, reduced the Republican majority in the United States Senate to one, and won a majority of the governorships.

Smith was the first Democratic nominee in the 20th century to win a majority of the twelve largest cities in the country. The net vote totals in the twelve largest cities shifted from Republican to Democratic with Harding having won 1,540,000 in 1920, Coolidge by 1,308,000 in 1924, while Smith won by 210,000. Samuel Lubell wrote in The Future of American Politics that Franklin D. Roosevelt's victory in the 1932 election was preceded by Smith's increased vote totals in urban areas.

== Nominations ==
=== Democratic Party nomination ===
Democratic Party (United States) 1932 Democratic Party ticket
Franklin D. Roosevelt	John Nance Garner
for President	for Vice President
44th Governor of New York (1929–1932)	39th Speaker of the House (1931–1933)

Democratic candidates:

- John Nance Garner, U.S. Speaker of the House, of Texas
- William H. Murray, governor of Oklahoma
- Franklin D. Roosevelt, governor of New York
- Al Smith (campaign), former governor of New York and 1928 Democratic presidential nominee
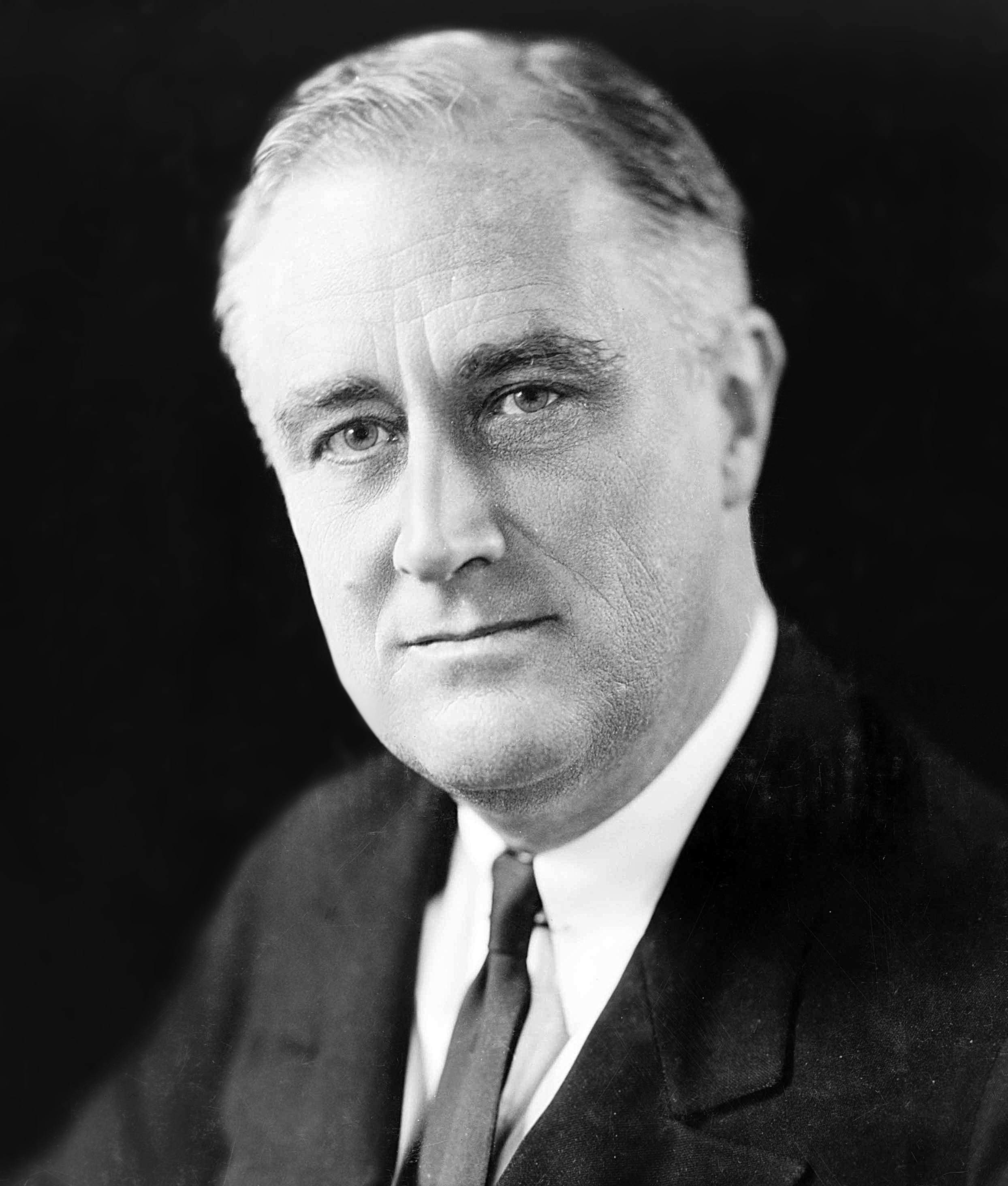
Governor Franklin D. Roosevelt of New York

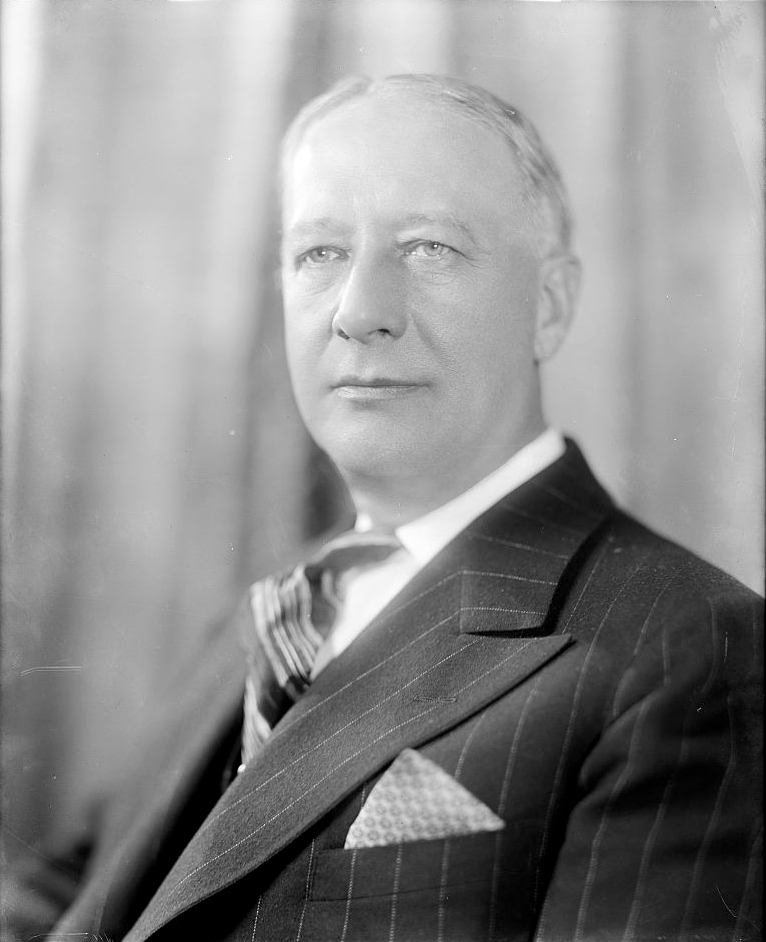
Former Governor Al Smith of New York
(campaign)

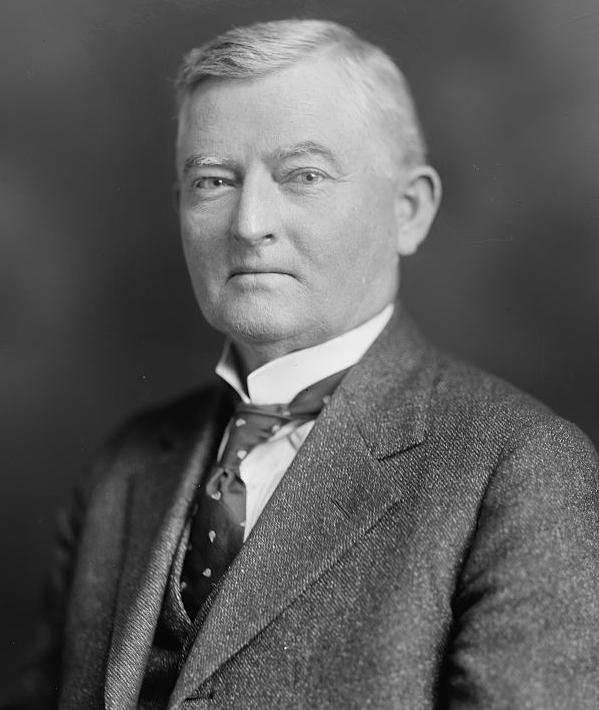
Speaker of the House John Nance Garner of Texas

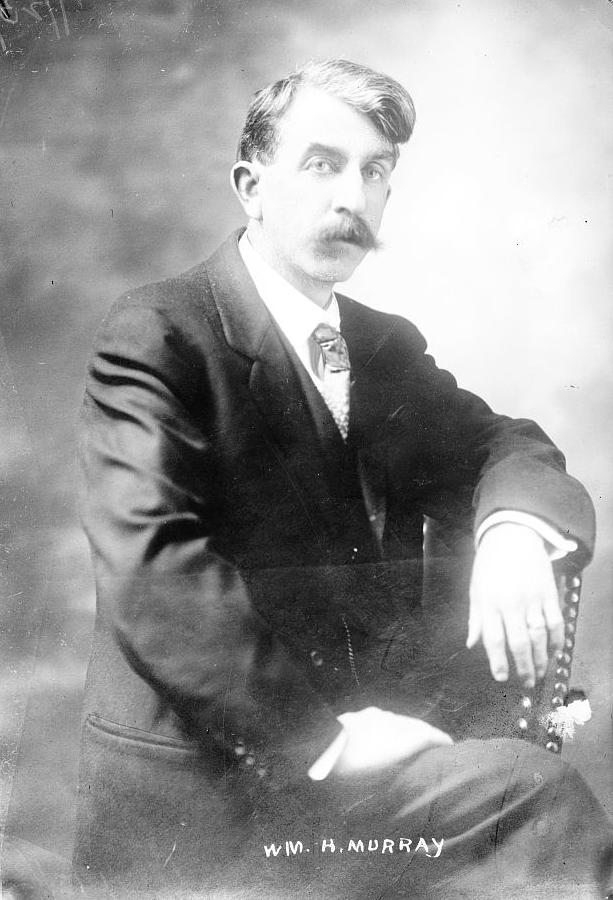
Governor William H. Murray of Oklahoma

Newsreel footage of Roosevelt's acceptance speech

Smith, who announced his candidacy on February 6, 1932, was a leading candidate as he had remained active in the party and retained his support from the 1928 campaign. Joseph Taylor Robinson, who had been Smith's vice-presidential running mate, announced that he would not be a candidate on March 31, 1932, and gave his support to Franklin D. Roosevelt. Jesse I. Straus conducted a poll of the delegates to the 1928 Democratic National Convention which showed that the majority supported Roosevelt, and additional polling showed Roosevelt winning in the primary and general election. Representative Edgar Howard stated that "Nine out of ten men in nine out of ten states are for Roosevelt, and he will be the Democratic choice." Roosevelt announced his campaign on January 23, 1932.

William H. Murray ran in multiple primaries and won one delegate in the North Dakota primary, but failed to win in the Florida, Nebraska, Oregon, and West Virginia primaries. He won in the Ohio primary as he was the only candidate on the ballot, but the delegates were instructed by the convention and not the primary. The Oklahoma convention selected to give him control of its twenty-two member delegation.

Newton D. Baker declined to run in the primaries, and instead planned on serving as a compromise candidate if neither Smith nor Roosevelt could win the nomination at the convention balloting. J. Hamilton Lewis won the presidential primary in Illinois on April 12, 1932, and the state's fifty-eight member delegation was instructed to vote for him, but he withdrew before the convention on June 25. The majority of the Illinois delegation supported Melvin Alvah Traylor for the first three ballots before giving their support to Roosevelt on the fourth ballot. Tom Pendergast, a political boss in Missouri, had the state's delegation instructed to vote for James A. Reed, who had run for the nomination in the 1928 election, and the delegation supported Reed for the first three ballots before switching to Roosevelt. Harry F. Byrd and George White were favorite son candidates from their states. A. Harry Moore was a favorite son candidate supported by Lewis, but the delegation of his home state New Jersey voted for Smith.

Both Smith and Roosevelt were against Prohibition, but Smith supported making it a main issue during the campaign while Roosevelt did not. John J. Raskob, who had become the chair of the Democratic National Committee with Smith's support, attempted to have the committee make a statement against prohibition in March 1931, and Smith gave a speech in support of it. James Farley, the chair of the New York State Democratic Committee and later Roosevelt's presidential campaign manager, had the New York committee pass a resolution opposing declarations before the national convention was held. Other state parties supported this resolution causing the vote to not happen. Raskob proposed the declaration again on January 9, 1932, but had the committee not take action on it.

Tammany Hall and Roosevelt had a truce during his governorship, but the organization came to openly oppose him for his role in Mayor Jimmy Walker's resignation. Tammany Hall supported Smith for the nomination at the convention causing Roosevelt to refuse to support their mayoral candidate in the 1933 election and to support Fiorello La Guardia in the 1937 election. Tammany Hall's power was also reduced by the adoption of proportional representation for the New York City Council. Roosevelt also gave support to the American Labor Party in order for Democratic voters to support the New Deal without giving support to Tammany Hall candidates. Representative John J. O'Connor, who represented one of the districts with the strongest Tammany influence and was the chair of the House Rules Committee, lost renomination in the Democratic primary and in the general election with the Republican nomination in the 1938 election.

Smith's strategy against Roosevelt was to use favorite son candidates to control the delegations of their states in places that would have otherwise gone for Roosevelt. The majority of Smith's support came from the northeast while Roosevelt's support came from the south and west. Wilbur Lucius Cross, Joseph B. Ely, Frank Hague, J. Howard McGrath, Moore, Raskob, and Jouett Shouse were among Smith's campaign leaders. Roosevelt attempted to have some of the favorite son candidates withdraw using Homer Stille Cummings as a mediator, but he was unsuccessful.

Seventeen states used primaries to select their delegates to the national conventions while the rest used a convention system. Roosevelt controlled the delegations from thirty states and additional delegations from Arkansas, Indiana, Kansas, and South Carolina had supporters of Roosevelt, but were uninstructed. Roosevelt was endorsed at the state convention in Mississippi, but the delegates were left uninstructed. Roosevelt also claimed that he had the support of the twenty-eight delegates from all of the territories. Smith controlled the delegates from four states. The remaining delegations were either uninstructed or under the control of favorite sons. Roosevelt failed to gain control of two-thirds of the delegates which was required for him to gain the nomination.

The convention was held in Chicago between June 27 and July 2. The first vote was taken at 4:28 on the morning of July 2, after ten hours of speeches that had begun at 5:00 on the previous afternoon. The Roosevelt delegations from Louisiana and Minnesota were seated giving Roosevelt an additional thirty-two votes. Thomas J. Walsh, an ally of Roosevelt, was elected to chair the convention against Shouse by a vote of 626 to 528. Roosevelt received the most votes on the first three ballots, but he still did not have a two-thirds majority.

John Nance Garner, who had the support of William Randolph Hearst, won in the California primary due to the support of the Texas State Society of California which had 100,000 members. Garner had the support of ninety delegates at the convention and Hearst created a compromise with Roosevelt. Roosevelt, who needed the support of the Californian and Texan delegations to gain a two-thirds majority, would receive the support of Garner's delegates in exchange for Garner being given the vice-presidential nomination. With this agreement, Garner's supporters in California and Texas were released by Sam Rayburn, Garner's campaign manager, and voted for Roosevelt on the fourth ballot, giving him the presidential nomination. Members of the Texas delegation who opposed Roosevelt were led by Amon G. Carter, but the Roosevelt supporters led by Thomas Whitfield Davidson won by a vote of 54 to 51. Connecticut, Massachusetts, New Jersey, New York, and Rhode Island were the only states whose delegations did not support Roosevelt on the final ballot. Garner won the vice-presidential nomination on the first ballot against Matthew A. Tinley and his nomination was made unanimous.

Presidential ballot	1st ballot	2nd	3rd ballot	4th ballot
Franklin D. Roosevelt	666.25	677.75	682.75	945
Al Smith	201.75	194.25	190.25	190.50
John Nance Garner	90.25	90.25	101.25	0
George White	52	50.5	52.5	0
Melvin Alvah Traylor	42.25	40.25	40.25	3
Harry F. Byrd	25	25	24	0
James A. Reed	24	18	27.5	0
William H. Murray	23	0	0	0
Albert Ritchie	21	23.5	23.5	0
Newton D. Baker	8.5	8	8.5	5.5
Will Rogers	0	22	0	0
James M. Cox	0	0	0	1
Not voting/absent	0	4.5	3.5	0
Reference				

=== Republican Party nomination ===
Republican Party (United States) 1932 Republican Party ticket
Herbert Hoover	Charles Curtis
for President	for Vice President
31st President of the United States (1929–1933)	31st Vice President of the United States (1929–1933)

Republican candidates:

- Calvin Coolidge, former president of the United States (declined)
- Herbert Hoover, president of the United States
- Joseph I. France, former senator from Maryland
- Dwight Morrow, senator from New Jersey (died)
President Herbert Hoover

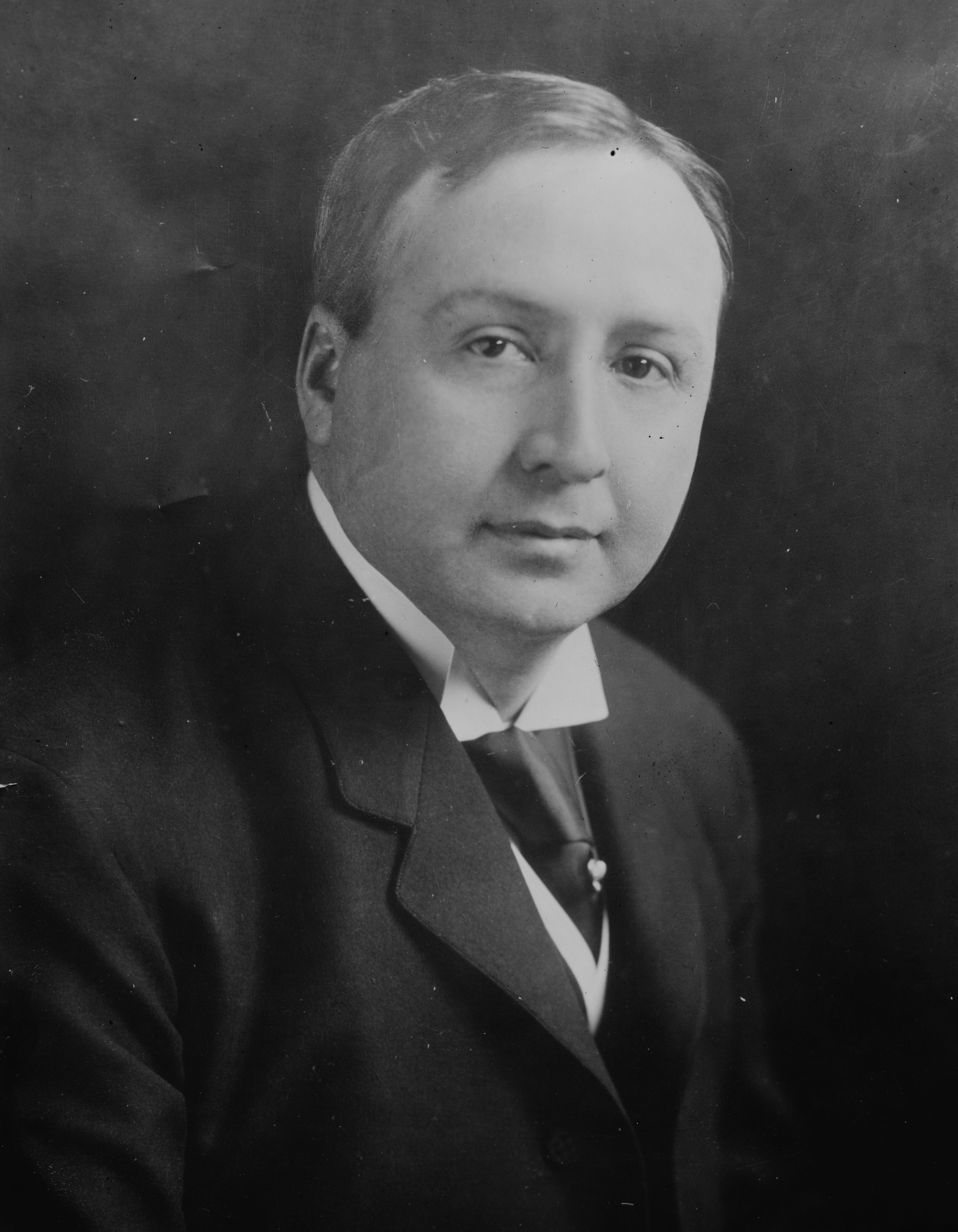
Former Senator Joseph I. France from Maryland

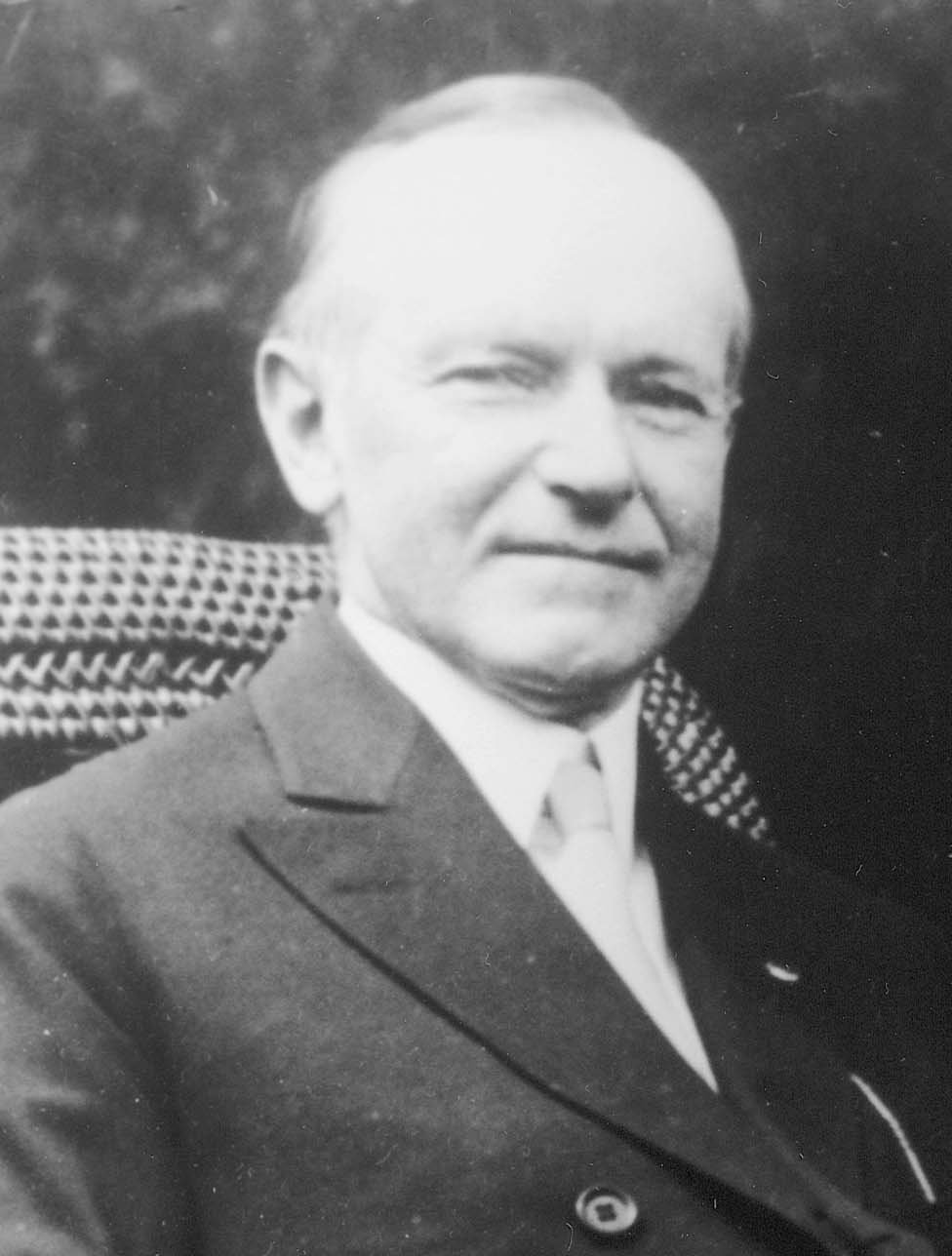
Calvin Coolidge, former president of the United States (declined)

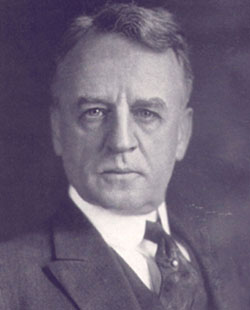
Senator Dwight Morrow from New Jersey (died)

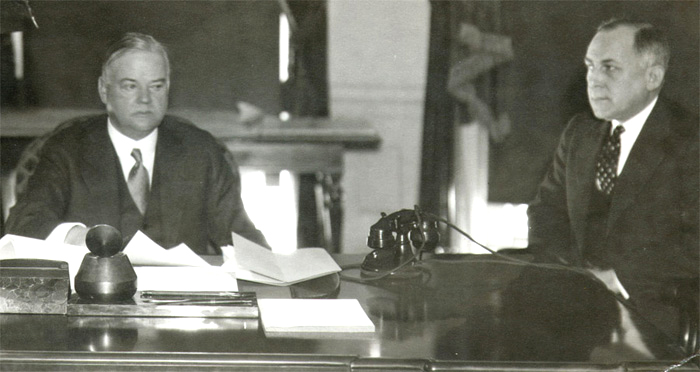
President Herbert Hoover and White House Press Secretary Theodore Joslin

In November 1931, Senator Hiram Johnson called for Hoover to retire as it would increase the chances of the Republicans winning in the 1932 election. Hoover's opponents in the Republican Party supported giving either former President Calvin Coolidge or Senator Dwight Morrow the party's presidential nomination. Morrow had been elected to the U.S. Senate from New Jersey in 1930, but died on October 5, 1931. On July 31, 1931, an article by James F. Coupal, Coolidge's former White House physician, was published by the St. Paul Dispatch in which Coupal stated that Coolidge would run "if the people of this country evince an unmistakable and unquestionable desire to draft him to pull the country out of this period of depression, and if he can have the presidency without any political or other obligations attached to it". Coolidge did not run for the nomination and an article written by him was published by The Saturday Evening Post on October 3, 1932, in which he gave his support to Hoover and was critical of those who had wanted him to run.

Charles G. Dawes was suggested as a candidate following Morrow's death and the unsuccessful attempt to draft Coolidge, but his selection as president of the Reconstruction Finance Corporation took him out of consideration. Progressive Republicans considered forming a third party, but William Borah, Johnson, George W. Norris, and Gifford Pinchot declined to lead such a movement. An attempt to have progressive leaders in multiple states run against Hoover failed and Borah stated that Hoover could not be defeated.

Hoover formally started his campaign by having Robert H. Lucas, executive director of the Republican National Committee, send out letters to precinct leaders in January 1931. Postmaster General Walter Folger Brown and Treasury Secretary Ogden L. Mills helped manage Hoover's campaign. Theodore Joslin started a publicity campaign to improve Hoover's image.

Joseph I. France, a member of the conservative faction, ran against Hoover in the primary, but only won in states where he was unopposed. These states also had no delegates bounded to their primaries leading to them sending pro-Hoover delegations. At the national convention Lawritz Bernhard Sandblast, a delegate from Oregon, nominated France, but France attempted to address the convention to withdraw his candidacy and instead nominate Coolidge. Hoover had him removed citing that he could not address the convention as he was not a delegate. Hoover, who was nominated by Joseph Scott, won renomination on the first ballot while France only received four delegates.

Dawes was proposed as a replacement for Vice President Charles Curtis, who faced opposition due to his age and prohibitionist stances, and delegations from over twenty states opposed the renomination of Curtis. However, Dawes declined to seek the vice-presidential nomination. Curtis, Alvan T. Fuller, James Harbord, Hanford MacNider, J. Leonard Replogle, and Bertrand Snell were nominated for the vice-presidential balloting. Curtis initially fell 19.25 votes short of winning on the first ballot, but the Pennsylvania delegation changed its support to Curtis causing him to win.

Presidential ballot	1st ballot	Vice-presidential ballot	1st ballot
Herbert Hoover	1126.5	Charles Curtis	633.75
John J. Blaine	13	Hanford MacNider	178.75
Calvin Coolidge	4.5	James Harbord	161.75
Joseph I. France	4	Edward Martin	75
Charles G. Dawes	1	Alvan T. Fuller	57
James Wolcott Wadsworth Jr.	1	Bertrand Snell	55
		Patrick J. Hurley	25
		J. Leonard Replogle	22.75
		Charles G. Dawes	9.75
		James J. Couzens	2
		William S. Kenyon	2
		David Sinton Ingalls	2
		Hiram Bingham III	1
Not voting	3	Not voting	0
Absent	1	Absent	1
Reference			

=== Other candidates ===
==== Socialist Party ====
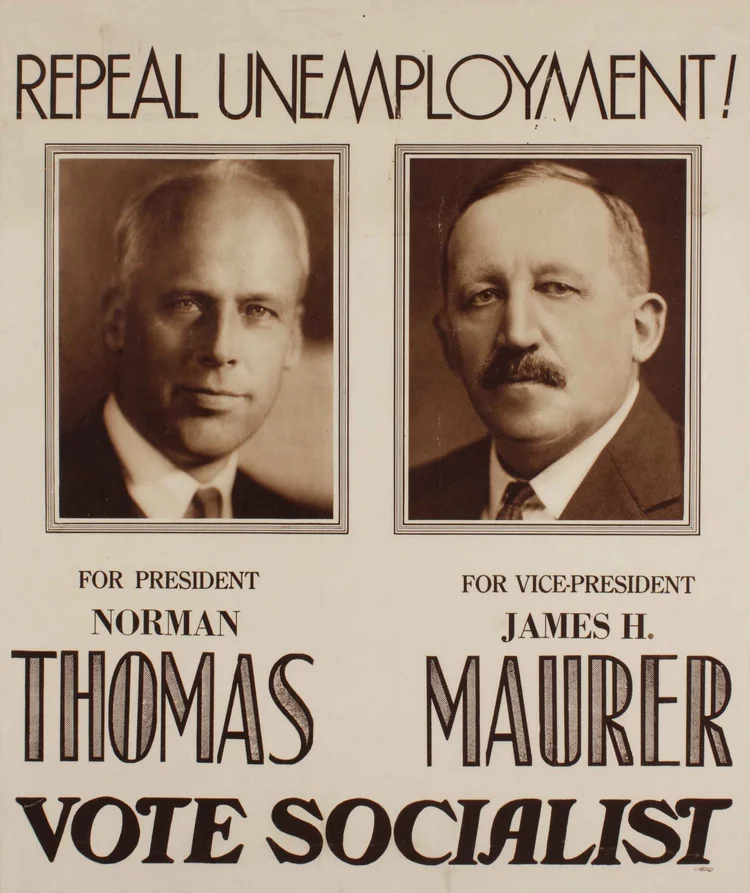
A Socialist Party campaign poster featuring Norman Thomas and James H. Maurer as candidates for president and vice president

Norman Thomas, who had been the Socialist Party of America's presidential nominee in the 1928 election and ran for a seat in the U.S. House of Representatives in the 1930 election, and James H. Maurer, who was the party's vice-presidential nominee in the 1928 election, were given the Socialist Party presidential and vice-presidential nominations at the national convention held May 21–24 in Milwaukee. Thomas and his faction unsuccessfully tried to have Morris Hillquit replaced as chair of the party by Daniel Hoan. The Literary Digest's polling predicted that Thomas would receive over two million votes.

==== Communist Party ====
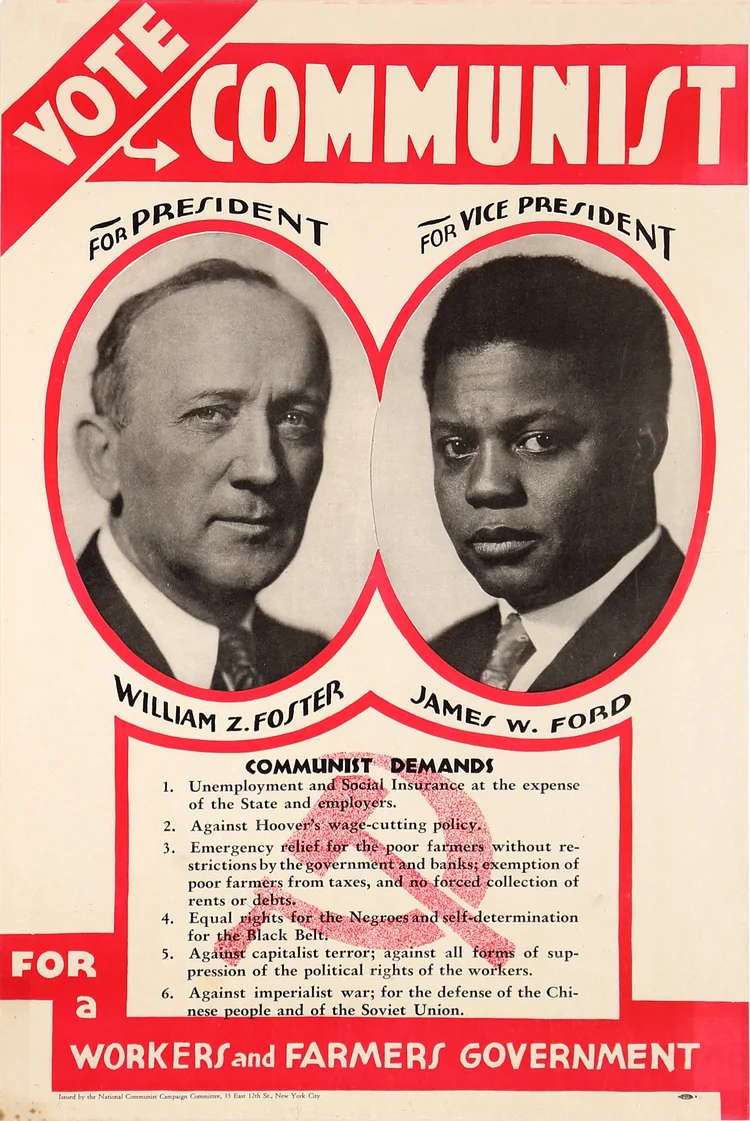
A Communist Party campaign poster featuring William Z. Foster and James W. Ford as candidates for president and vice president, along with the party's demands

William Z. Foster, who had been the Communist Party USA's presidential nominee in the 1928 election, was given the presidential nomination at the national convention held from May 28–29 in Chicago, and James W. Ford was given the vice-presidential nomination.

==== Farmer-Labor Party ====
Frank Webb and Jacob S. Coxey Sr., former mayor of Massillon, Ohio, were given the presidential and vice-presidential nominations of the Farmer–Labor Party at its convention on April 28 in Omaha, Nebraska. John R. Brinkley, Thomas Mooney, and Arthur C. Townley had also been proposed as candidates for the nomination. However, Webb was removed from the ticket with the party stating that he was "a tool of the Hoover administration," and Coxey was given the presidential nomination. The Minnesota Farmer–Labor Party did not support the national party's ticket. After the Farmer-Labor presidential nomination was taken from him, Webb formed the Liberty Party with him as its presidential nominee while the larger Liberty Party gave its nomination to William Hope Harvey.

==== Liberal Party ====
Samuel Harden Church, who had formed the Liberal Party in Pennsylvania which received 366,572 votes on its ballot line in the 1930 gubernatorial election, unsuccessfully tried to form a national anti-prohibitionist Liberal Party. Nicholas Murray Butler proposed the creation of a new party on May 19, 1932, which would be composed of the moderate wings of both existing Democratic and Republican parties.

== General election ==
=== Campaign ===
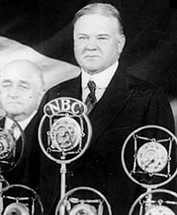
Hoover addresses a large crowd in his 1932 campaign.

After making an airplane trip to the Democratic convention, Roosevelt accepted the nomination in person. In his speech, he stated, "ours must be a party of liberal thought, of planned action, of the enlightened international outlook, and of the greatest good to the greatest number of our citizens." Roosevelt's trip to Chicago was the first of several successful, precedent-making moves designed to make him appear to be the candidate of change in the election. Large crowds greeted Roosevelt as he traveled around the nation; his campaign song "Happy Days Are Here Again" became one of the most popular in American political history – and, indeed, the unofficial anthem of the Democratic Party. Democratic leaders in the eastern United States supported having Roosevelt conduct a front porch campaign, but Roosevelt and the leaders in the western United States instead supported an active campaign. Roosevelt gave twenty-seven major speeches during the campaign while Hoover initially planned on giving three major speeches during the campaign, but it was later increased to ten and Hoover traveled over 10,000 miles.

Simeon D. Fess, who had become chair of the Republican National Committee with Hoover's support, resigned from his position and was replaced by Everett Sanders also with Hoover's support. Raskob, who became the chair of the Democratic National Convention with Smith's support, was replaced by Farley. Campaign expenditures for both parties fell from the 1928 election to the 1932 election. The combined expenditures of both national committees would be $5,146,027 which was less than $0.13 per voter. This was the lowest amount spent per voter since the 1912 election with most elections costing around $0.19–0.20 per voter and the 1924 presidential election costing $0.15 per voter.

After seeing the value of radio in 1920s elections both parties spent large amounts on broadcasts, with 17–18% of Democratic and over 20% of the Republican national committees spending being towards radio. During the 1928 election the Republicans paid $420,000 to radio companies and increased their spending to $437,000 during the 1932 election. The Democrats reduced their spending with their amount falling from $550,000 during the 1928 election to $343,415 during the 1932 election, because of fewer funds; the party only purchased 52 hours of airtime, fewer than in 1928, while Republicans bought 73 hours versus 43 hours in 1928.

During the campaign NBC and CBS aired 203 programs of paid time that took up 116 hours and 15 minutes. One hundred thirty-six of those programs were for the Republicans, seventy-one for the Democrats, and three for the Socialists. The Republicans had seventy hours and thirty-two minutes, the Democrats had forty-nine hours and thirty-two minutes, and the Socialists had forty-five minutes of air time.

Roosevelt made gains with voters compared to Smith's 1928 campaign. The southerners who had supported Hoover in the 1928 campaign returned to the Democratic Party and progressive Republicans under the leadership of Bronson M. Cutting, Johnson, Robert M. La Follette Jr., Norris, and Henry A. Wallace left the Republicans to support Roosevelt. Farley predicted that Roosevelt would win in forty-four states and later congratulated Sanders on his imagination and courage when Sanders predicted that Hoover would win 338 electoral votes.

After their divisive convention, Democrats united around Roosevelt, who was able to draw more universal support than Al Smith had in 1928. Roosevelt's Protestant background prevented the anti-Catholic attacks Smith faced in 1928, and the Depression seemed to be of much greater concern among the American public than previous cultural battles. Prohibition was increasingly unpopular, and wets offered the argument that states and localities needed the tax money. Hoover proposed a new constitutional amendment that was vague on particulars and satisfied neither side. Roosevelt's platform promised repeal of the 18th Amendment.

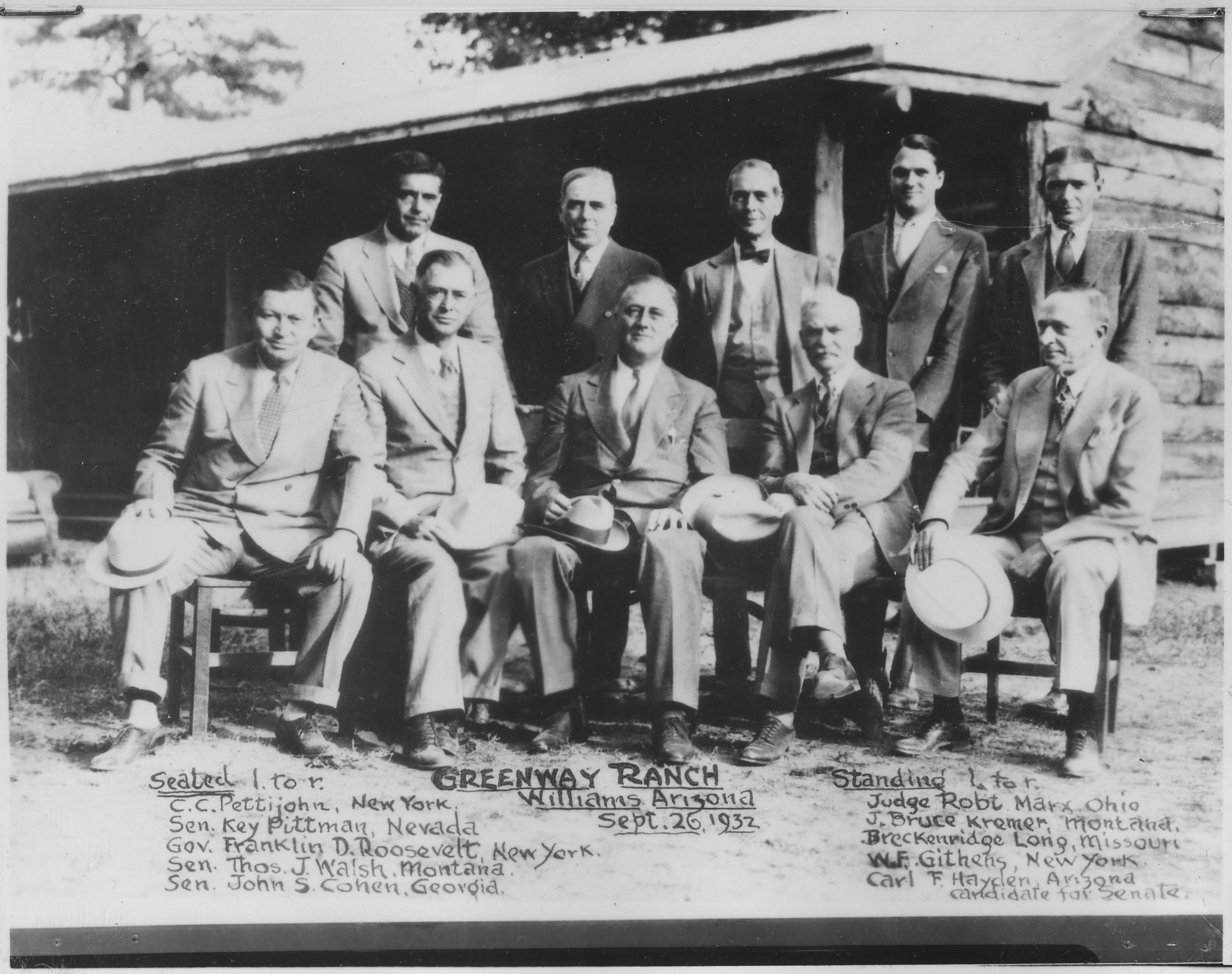
Roosevelt (seated, center) at Greenway Ranch in Williams, Arizona on September 26, 1932. He is accompanied by U.S. Senator from Arizona Carl Hayden standing far right, along with – among others – three Democrats from the U.S. Senate (seated): Pittman, Walsh, and Cohen.

In contrast, Hoover was not supported by many of the more prominent Republicans and violently opposed by others, in particular by a number of senators who had fought him throughout his administration and whose national reputation made their opposition of considerable importance. Many prominent Republicans even went so far as to espouse the cause of the Democratic candidate openly.

Making matters worse for Hoover was that many Americans blamed him for the Great Depression. The outrage caused by the deaths of veterans in the Bonus Army incident in the summer of 1932, combined with the catastrophic economic effects of Hoover's domestic policies, reduced his chances of a second term from slim to none. His attempts to campaign in public were a disaster, as he often had objects thrown at him or his vehicle as he rode through city streets. Hoover's unpopularity resulted in Roosevelt's adoption of a cautious campaign strategy, focused on minimizing gaffes and keeping public attention directed towards his opponent.

As governor of New York, Roosevelt had garnered a reputation for promoting government help for the impoverished, providing a welcome contrast for many who saw Hoover as a do-nothing president. Roosevelt emphasized working collectively through an expanded federal government to confront the economic crisis, a contrast to Hoover's emphasis on individualism. During the campaign, Roosevelt ran on many of the programs that would later become part of the New Deal during his presidency. It was said that "even a vaguely talented dog-catcher could have been elected president against the Republicans." Hoover even received a letter from an Illinois man that advised, "Vote for Roosevelt and make it unanimous."

While Hoover was not an effective speaker on radio, broadcasters thought that Roosevelt was the country's best political speaker. Roosevelt employed the radio to great effect during the campaign. He was able to outline his platform while also improving the perception of his personality. In March 1932, The New York Times quoted radio producer John Carlile, who said that Roosevelt had a "tone of perfect sincerity", while for Hoover, "the microphone betrays deliberate effort in his radio voice." The technology not only allowed Roosevelt to reach far more voters than he could via in-person campaigning, but also drew attention away from his paralysis due to polio. Roosevelt took great pains to hide the effects of the disease from voters, instituting a "gentleman's agreement" with the press that he was not to be photographed in ways that would highlight his disability.

=== Results ===
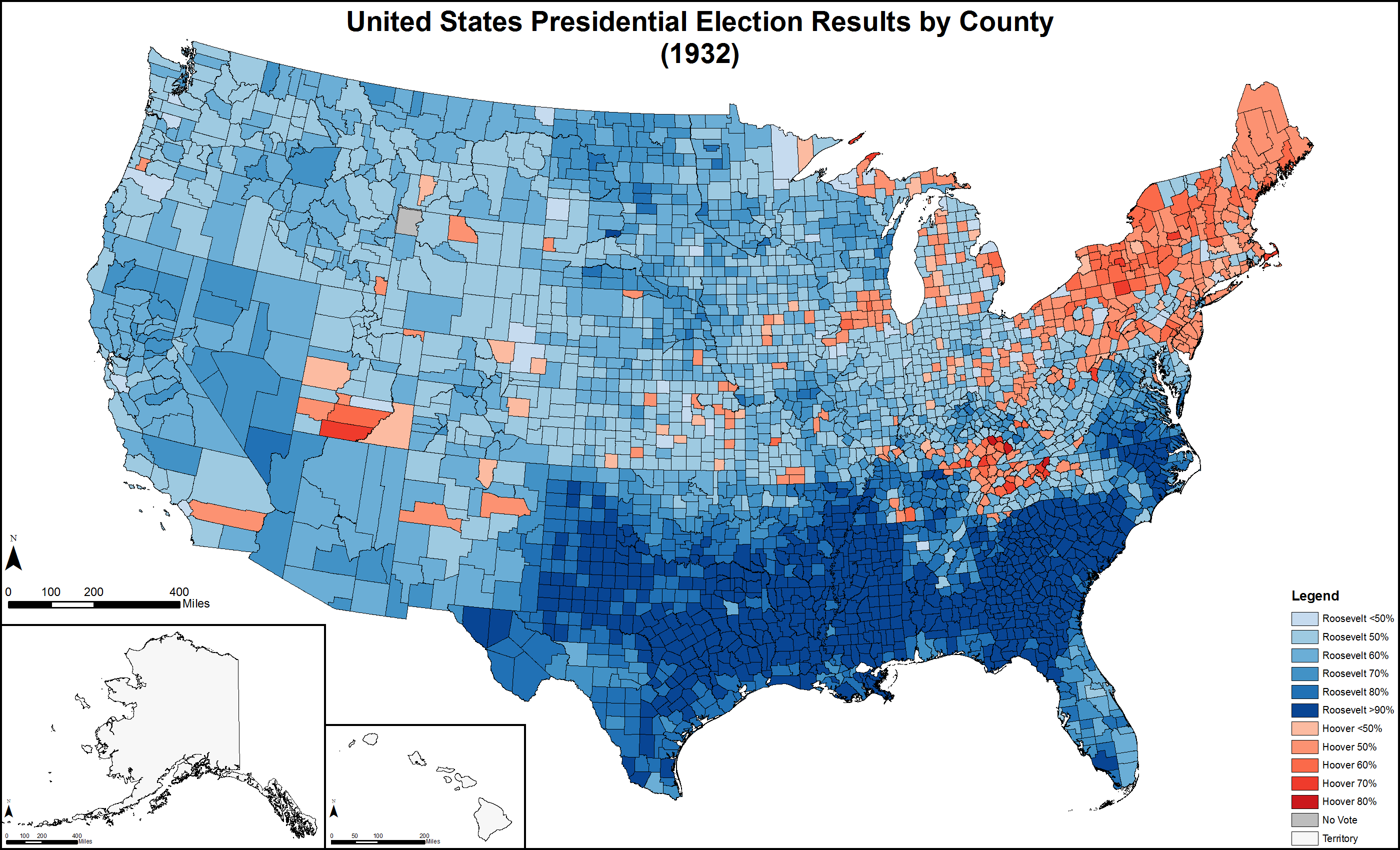
Results by county explicitly indicating the percentage for the winning candidate. Shades of blue are for Roosevelt (Democratic), shades of red are for Hoover (Republican), grey indicates zero recorded votes and white indicates territories not elevated to statehood.

Roosevelt defeated Hoover in the election. Hoover became the seventh president to lose reelection after John Adams, John Quincy Adams, Martin Van Buren, Grover Cleveland, Benjamin Harrison, and William Howard Taft. Another president would not lose an election to another term until Gerald Ford was defeated by Jimmy Carter in the 1976 presidential election. This was the first election since 1916 (16 years earlier) in which the Democratic candidate won. Roosevelt was the last sitting governor to be elected president until Bill Clinton in 1992.

Although the "other" vote (the combined vote total for candidates other than the nominees of the two major parties) of 1932 was three times that of 1928, it was considerably less than what had been recorded in 1920, the time of the greatest "other" vote, with the exception of the unusual conditions prevailing in 1912 and 1924. This was the last election where a Socialist Party presidential candidate received over 500,000 votes as of 2024.

Roosevelt, the Democratic candidate, received 22,817,883 votes (57.41%), the largest vote ever cast for a candidate for the presidency up until that time, and over 1,425,000 more than that cast for Hoover four years earlier.

While Hoover had won a greater percentage of the vote in 1928 (as did Harding in 1920), the national swing of 17.59% to the Democrats impressed all who considered the distribution of the vote: more than one-sixth of the electorate had switched from supporting the Republicans to the Democrats, the largest swing in either direction between consecutive elections. (Note: The largest Republican swing between consecutive elections was in 1920, when there was a 14.65% swing to the Republicans.)

Roosevelt improved on Smith's net vote total performance in the twelve largest cities. Smith had won those areas by 210,000 votes in the 1928 election while Roosevelt won by 1,791,000 votes. Roosevelt's worst performance in the country was in the eastern United States where all six of the states that voted for Hoover came from. Hoover only won in forty-five counties west of the Mississippi. The 0.09% difference between the tipping point state (Iowa) and the national popular vote is tied as the smallest in history (along with 1892).

This was a political realignment election: not only did Roosevelt win a sweeping victory over Hoover, but Democrats significantly extended their control over the U.S. House, gaining 101 seats, and also gained 12 seats in the U.S. Senate to gain control of the chamber. Twelve years of Republican leadership came to an end, and 20 consecutive years of Democratic control of the White House began. Until 1932, the Republicans had controlled the presidency for 52 of the previous 72 years, dating back to Abraham Lincoln being elected president in 1860. After 1932, Democrats would control the presidency for 32 of the next 48 years.

Roosevelt led the poll in 2,722 counties, the greatest number ever carried by a candidate up until that time. Of these, 282 had never before been Democratic. Only 374 remained loyally Republican. Half of the total vote of the nation was cast in just eight states (New York, New Jersey, Pennsylvania, Ohio, Illinois, Indiana, Michigan, and Wisconsin); in these states, Hoover polled 8,592,163 votes. In one section (West South Central), the Republican percentage sank to 16.21%, but in no other section did the party poll less than 30% of the vote cast. However, the relative appeal of the two candidates in 1932 and the decline of the appeal of Hoover as compared with 1928 are shown in the fact that the Republican vote increased in 1932 in only 87 counties, while the Democratic vote increased in 3,003 counties. Hoover also failed to flip any counties; the next time this would happen was in 2024, over 90 years later. Hoover is also the most recent Republican candidate not to flip any counties.

The vote cast for Hoover, and the fact that in only one section of the nation (West South Central) did he have less than 500,000 votes and in only three states outside of the South less than 50,000 votes, made it clear that the nation remained a two-party electorate, and that everywhere, despite the overwhelming triumph of the Democrats, there was a party membership devoted to neither the new administration nor the proposals of the Socialist candidate who had polled 75% of the "other" vote (as well as the highest raw vote total of his campaigns).

This election marks the last time as of 2026 that a Republican presidential candidate won a majority of black and African-American votes: as New Deal policies took effect, the strong support of black voters for these programs began a transition from their traditional support for Republicans to providing solid majorities for Democrats. The Roosevelt ticket swept every region of the country except the Northeast, and carried many reliable Republican states that had not been carried by the Democrats since their electoral landslide of 1912, when the Republican vote was split in two. Michigan voted Democratic for the first time since the emergence of the Republican Party in 1854, and Minnesota was carried by a Democrat for the first time since its admission to statehood in 1858, leaving Vermont as the only remaining state never to be carried by a Democratic candidate (which it would not be until 1964). South Dakota voted Democratic for the first time since 1896.

Roosevelt's victory with 472 electoral votes stood until the 1964 victory of Lyndon B. Johnson, who won 486 electoral votes in 1964, as the most ever won by a first-time contestant in a presidential election. Roosevelt also bettered the national record of 444 electoral votes set by Hoover only four years earlier, but would shatter his own record when he was re-elected in 1936 with 523 votes. This was the last election in which Connecticut, Delaware, New Hampshire, and Pennsylvania voted Republican until 1948.

The eleven states of the former Confederacy provided 4.45% of Hoover's votes, with him taking 18.55% of the vote in that region. His share of the vote in the South sharply declined from the 47.41% he received in 1928.

Electoral results
Presidential candidate	Party	Home state	Popular vote		Electoral vote	Running mate		
Presidential candidate	Party	Home state	Count	Percentage	Electoral vote	Vice-presidential candidate	Home state	Electoral vote
Franklin D. Roosevelt	Democratic	New York	22,821,277	57.41%	472	John Nance Garner	Texas	472
Herbert Hoover (incumbent)	Republican	California	15,761,254	39.65%	59	Charles Curtis (incumbent)	Kansas	59
Norman Thomas	Socialist	New York	884,885	2.23%	0	James H. Maurer	Pennsylvania	0
William Z. Foster	Communist	Illinois	103,307	0.26%	0	James W. Ford	Alabama	0
William David Upshaw	Prohibition	Georgia	81,905	0.21%	0	Frank S. Regan	Illinois	0
William Hope Harvey	Liberty	Arkansas	53,425	0.13%	0	Frank Hemenway	Washington	0
Verne L. Reynolds	Socialist Labor	New York	34,038	0.09%	0	John W. Aiken	Massachusetts	0
Jacob S. Coxey Sr.	Farmer-Labor	Ohio	7,431	0.02%	0	Julius Reiter	Minnesota	0
Other			4,376	0.01%	—	Other		—
Total			39,751,898	100%	531			531
Needed to win					266			266

Source (popular vote): Leip, David. "1932 Presidential Election Results". Dave Leip's Atlas of U.S. Presidential Elections. Source (electoral vote): "Electoral College Box Scores 1789–1996". National Archives and Records Administration.

Popular vote
Roosevelt	57.41%
Hoover	39.65%
Thomas	2.23%
Foster	0.26%
Others	0.45%

Electoral vote
Roosevelt	88.89%
Hoover	11.11%

=== Geography of results ===
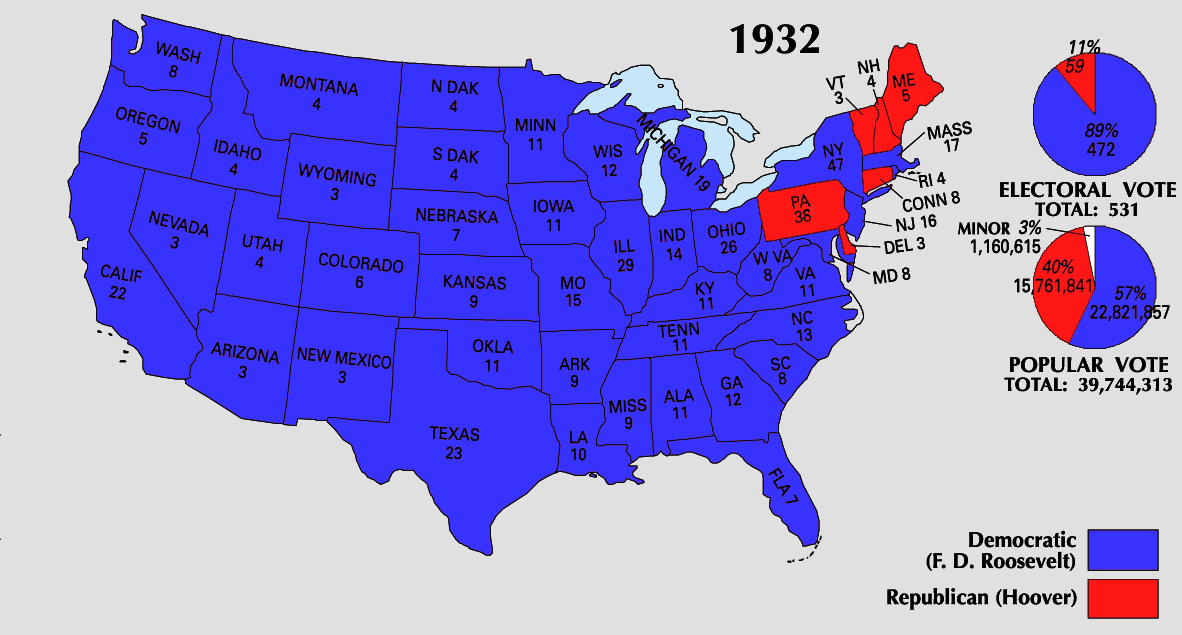

Results by county, shaded according to winning candidate's percentage of the vote

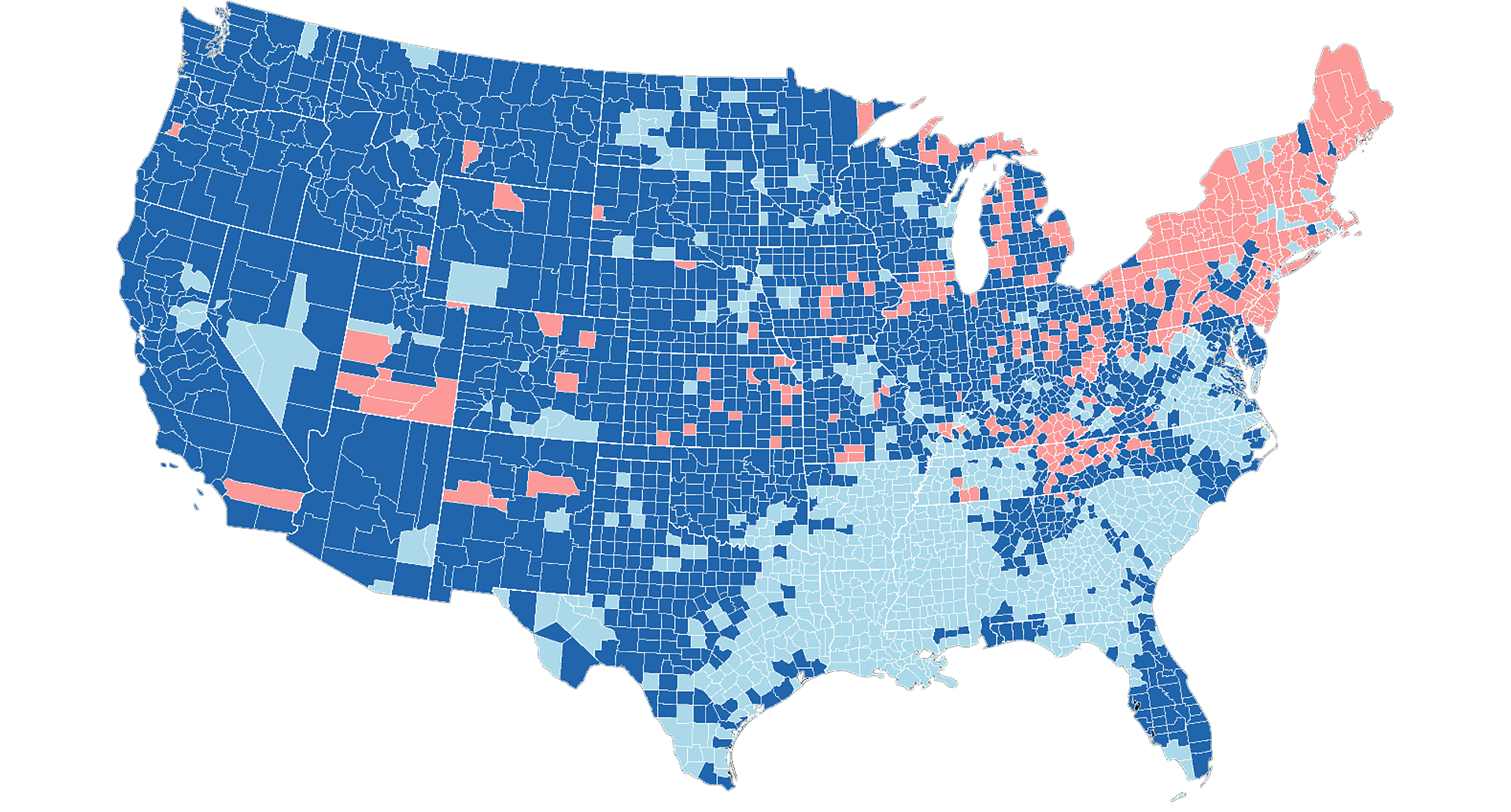
1928–1932 presidential election county flips. Dark blue indicates a red 28 county - blue 32 county, light blue indicates it voted blue both times, and light red indicates it voted red both times.

==== Cartographic gallery ====
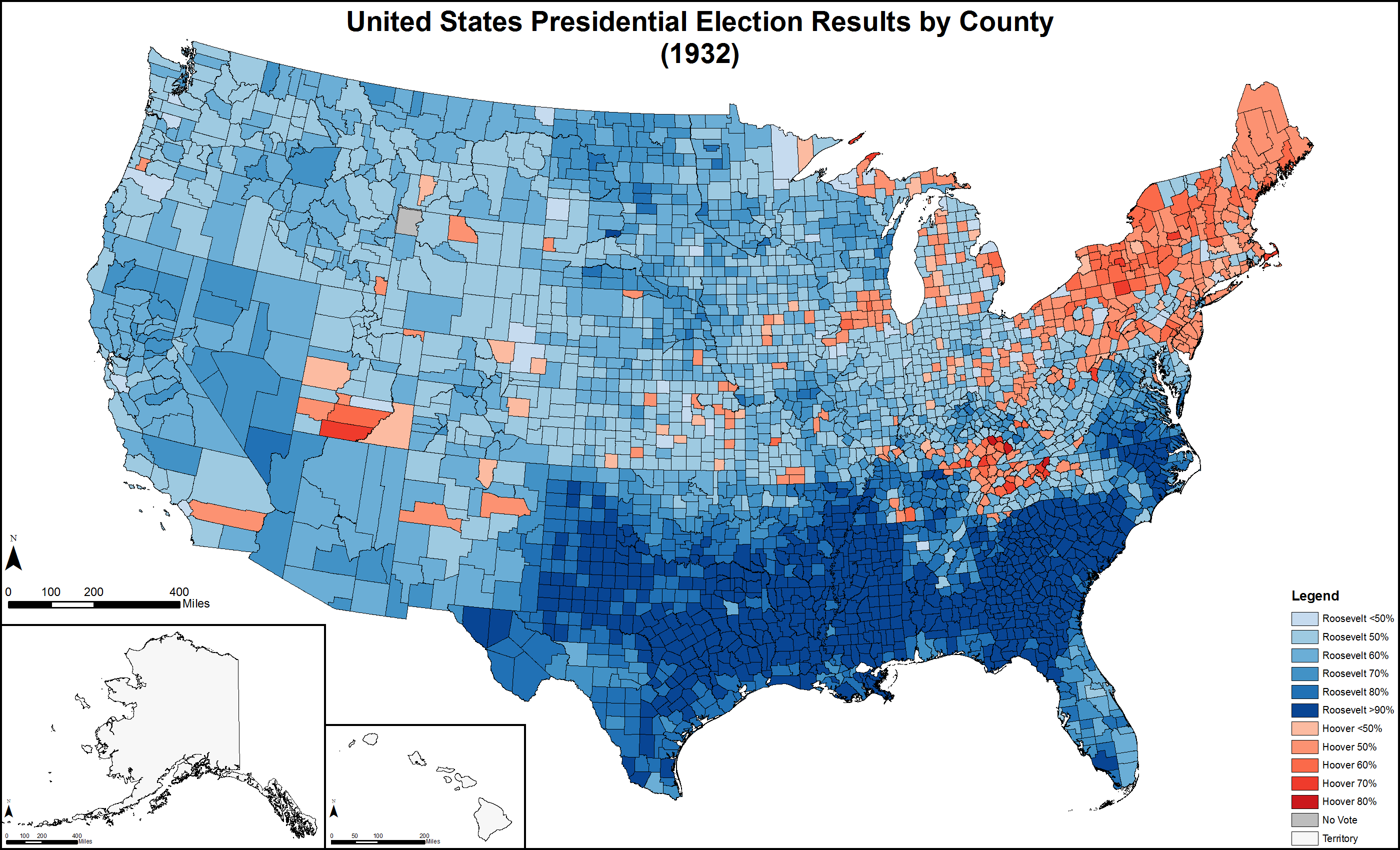
Presidential election results by county

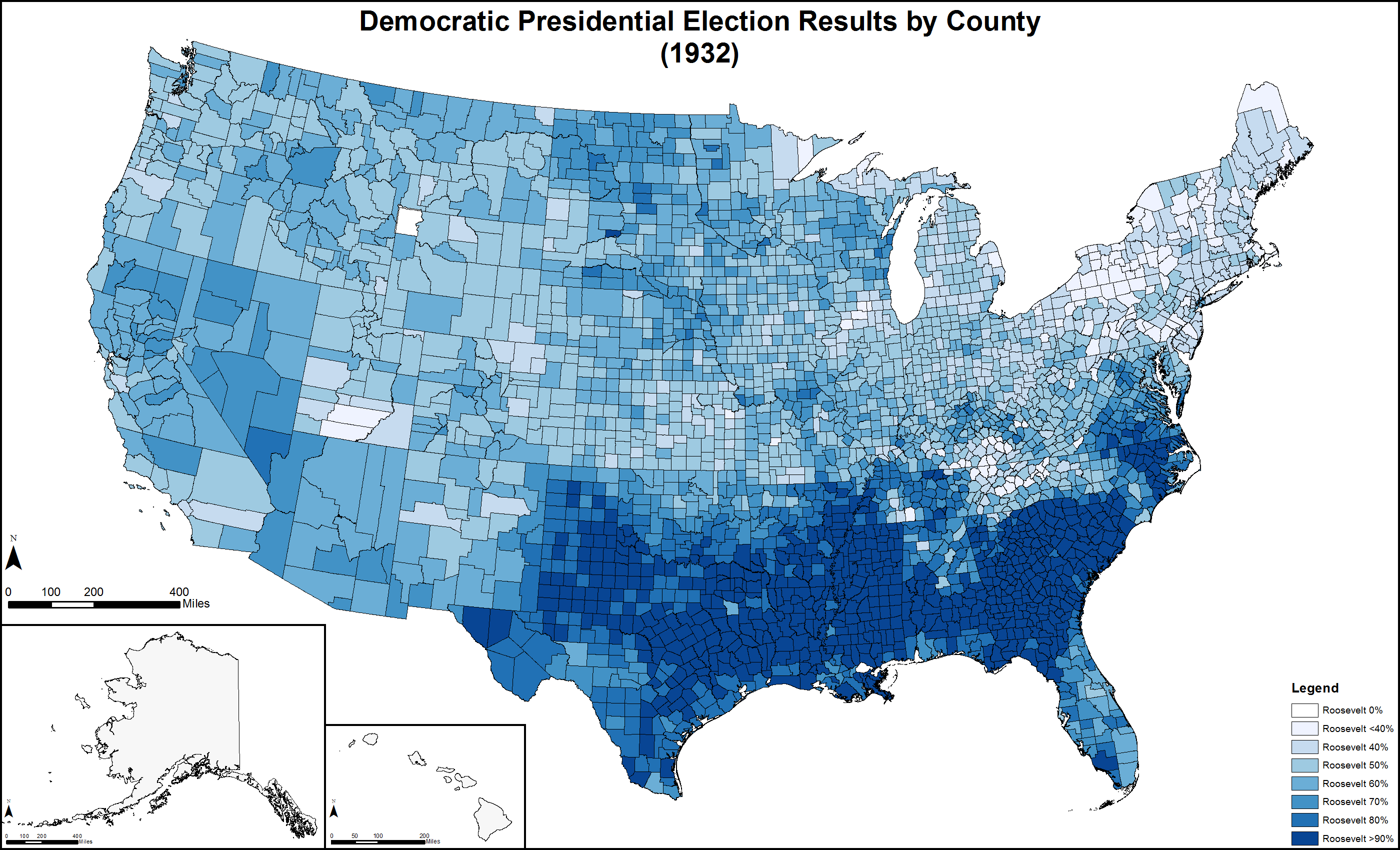
Democratic presidential election results by county

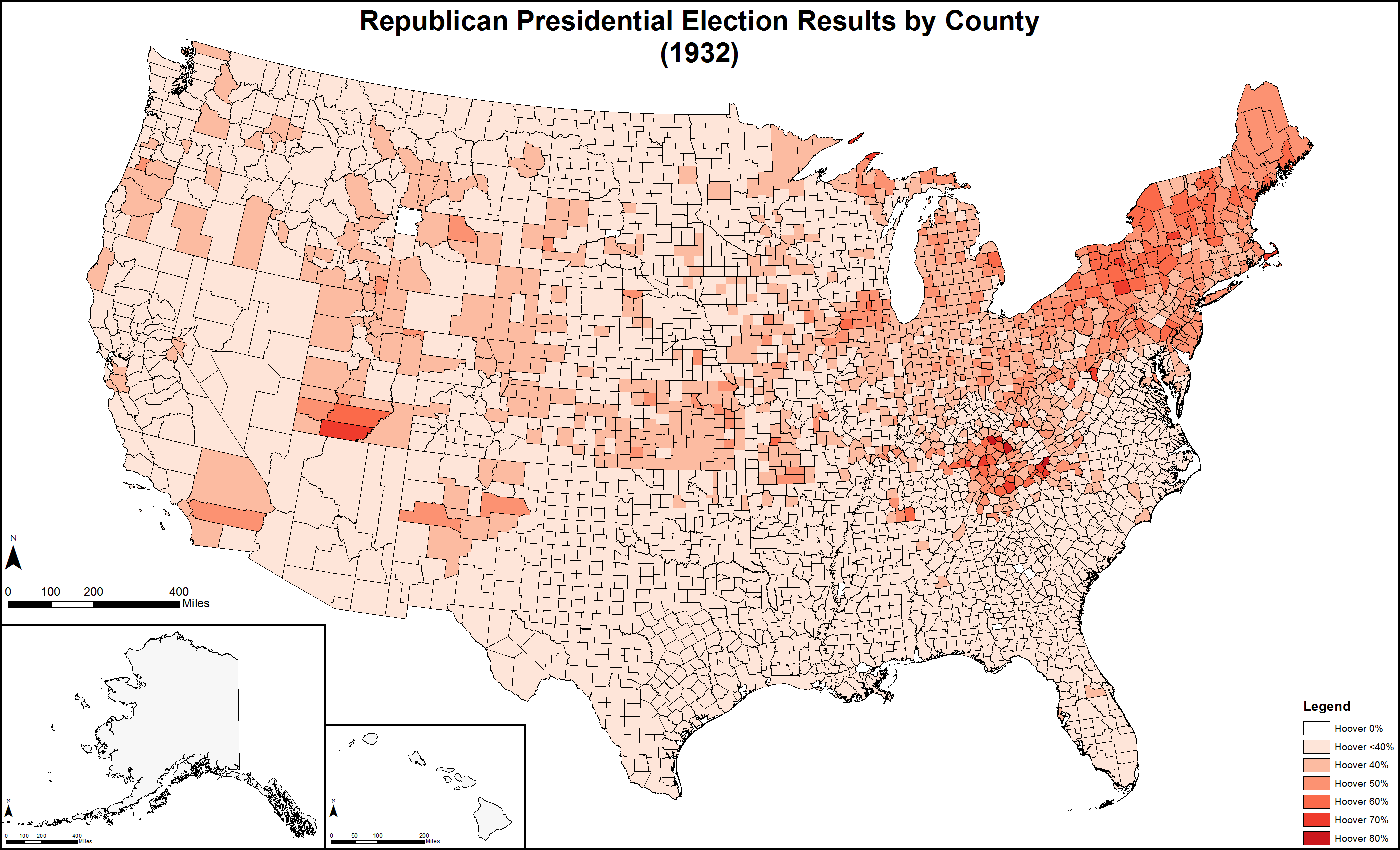
Republican presidential election results by county

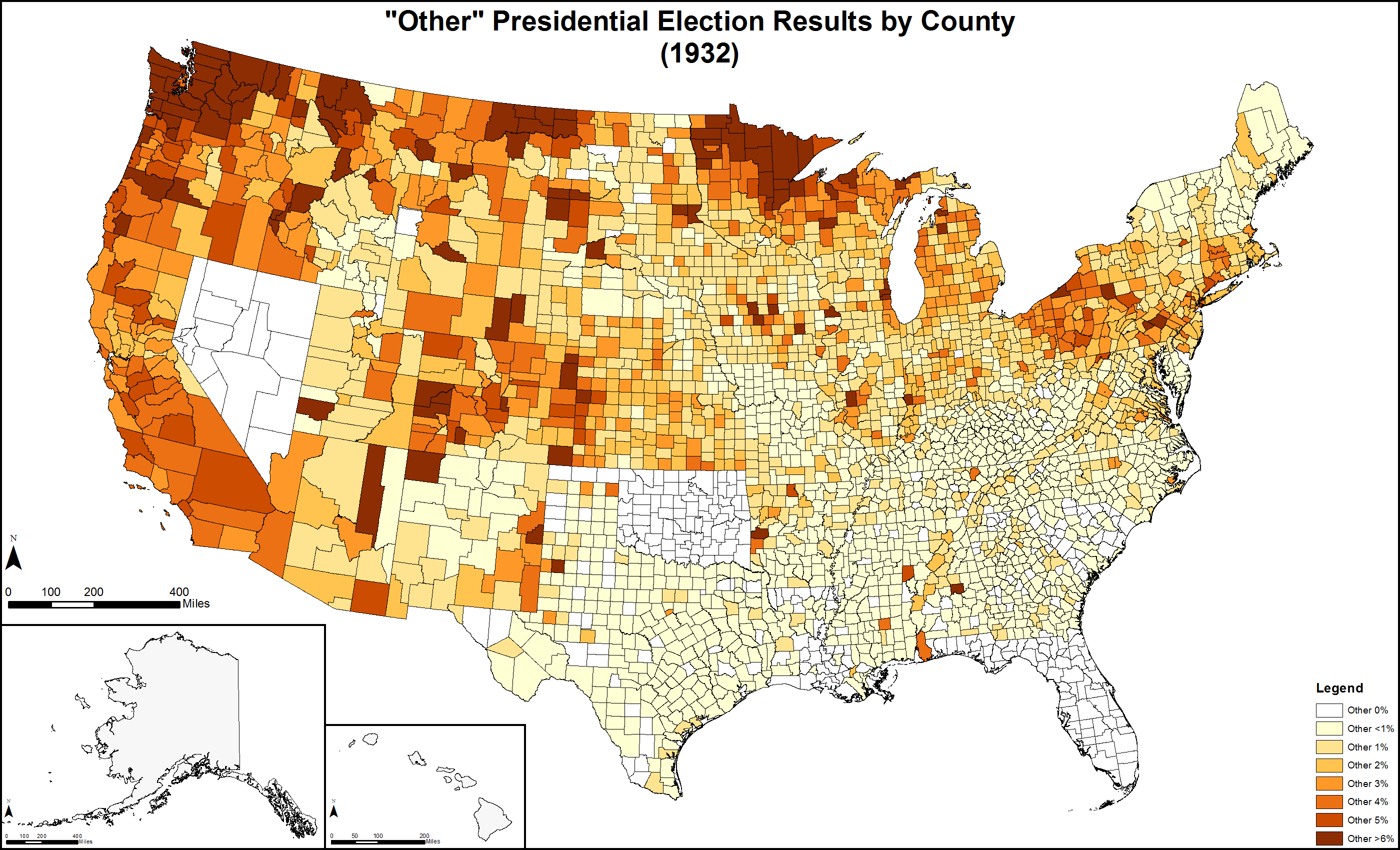
"Other" presidential election results by county

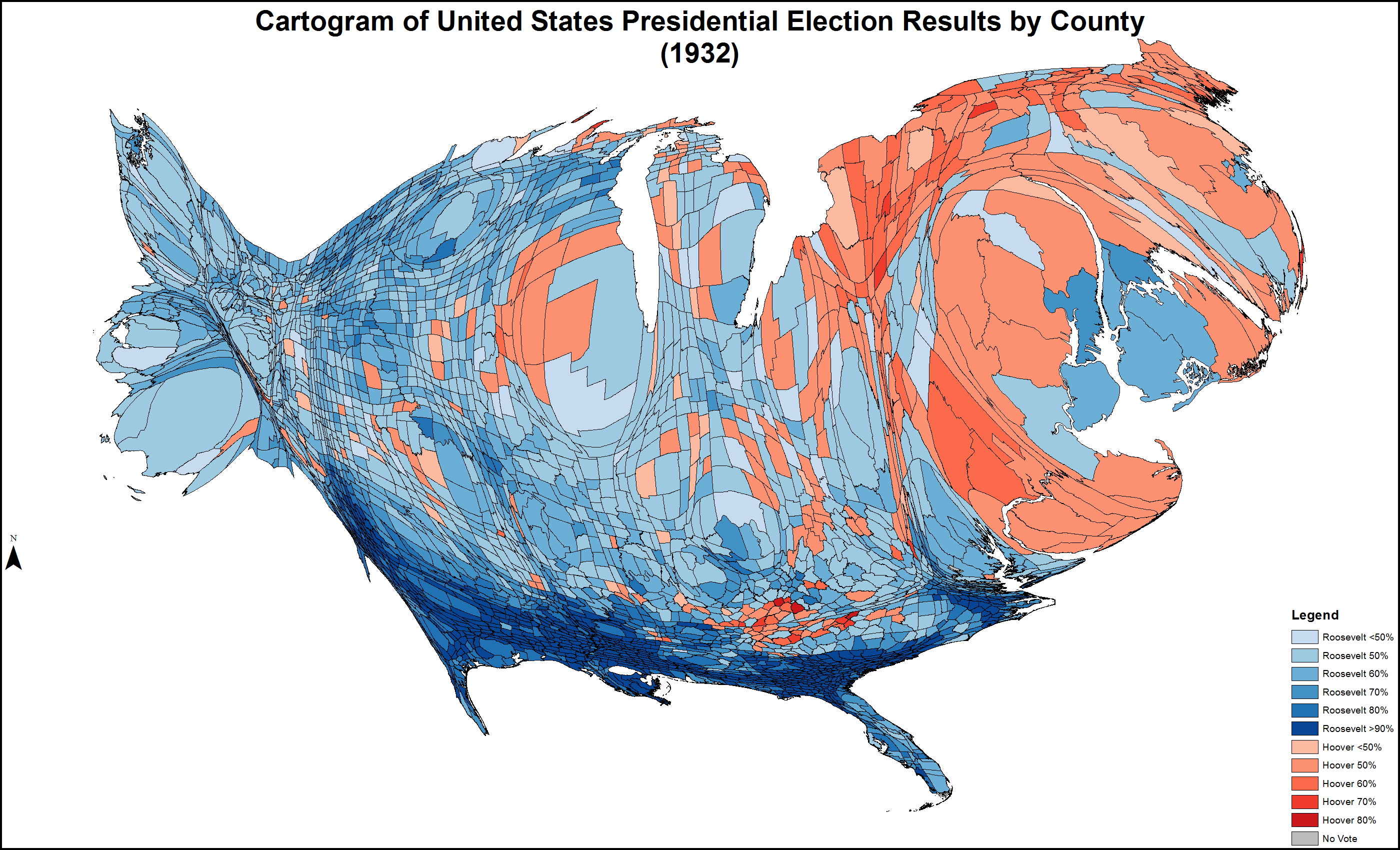
Cartogram of presidential election results by county

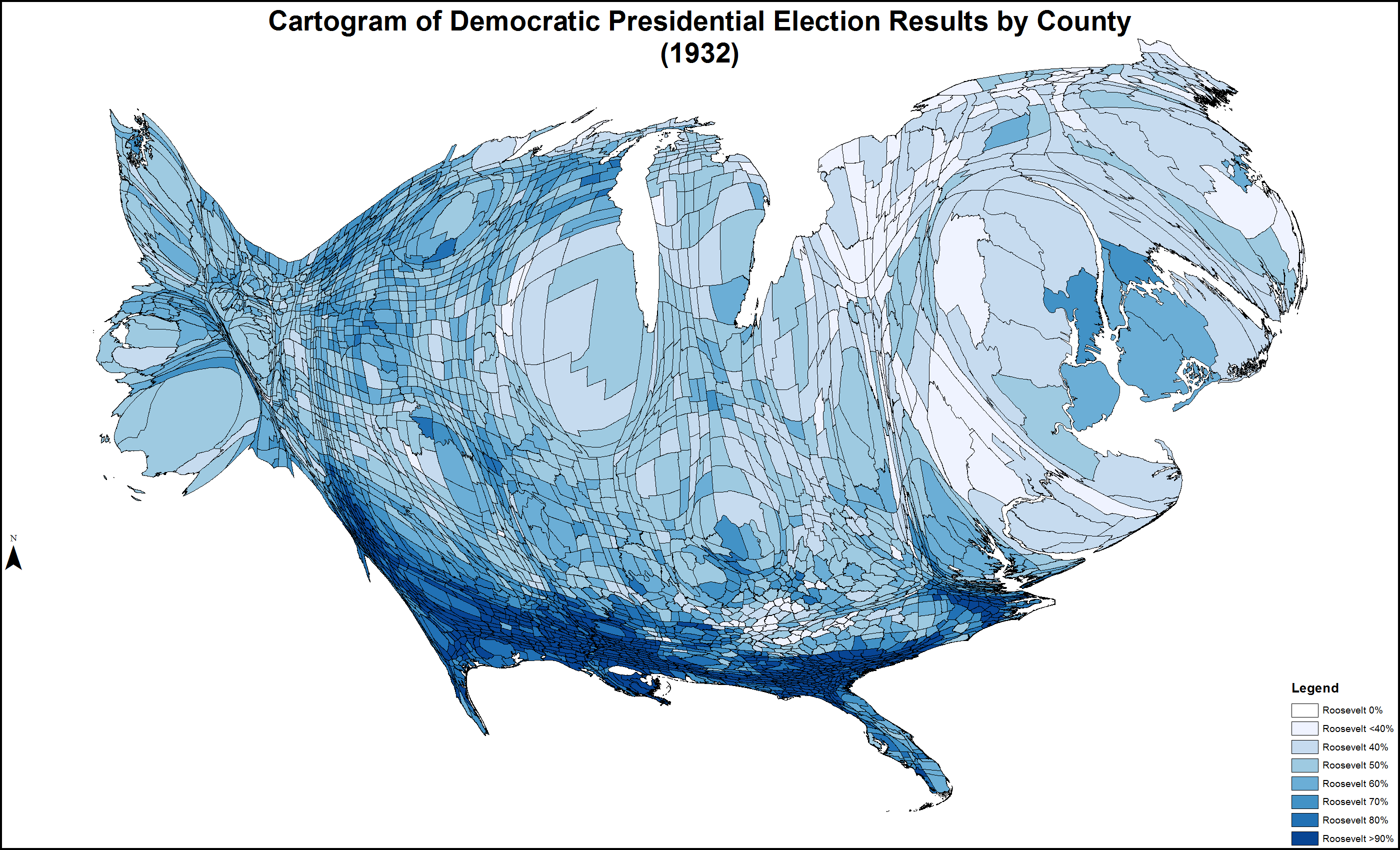
Cartogram of Democratic presidential election results by county

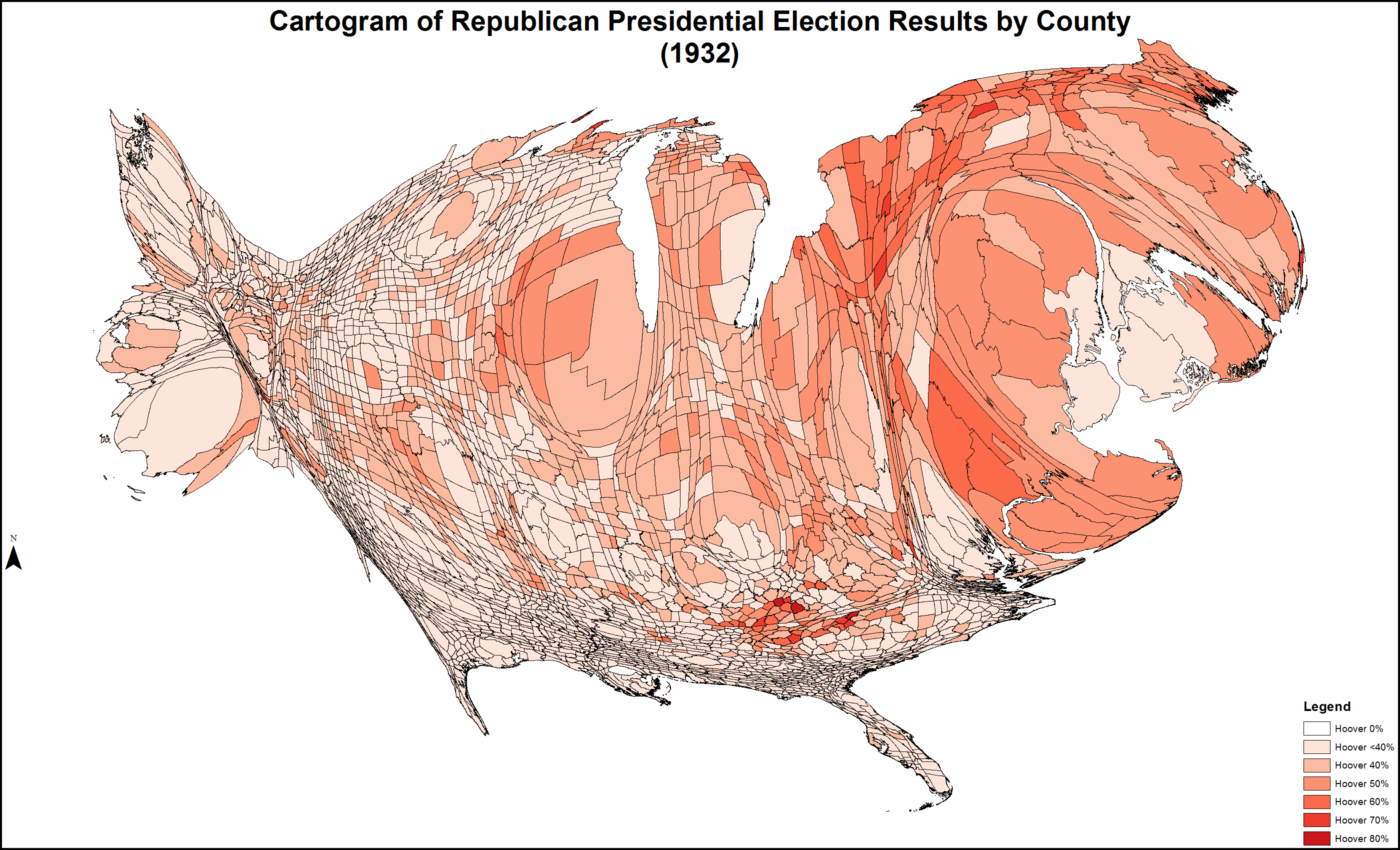
Cartogram of Republican presidential election results by county

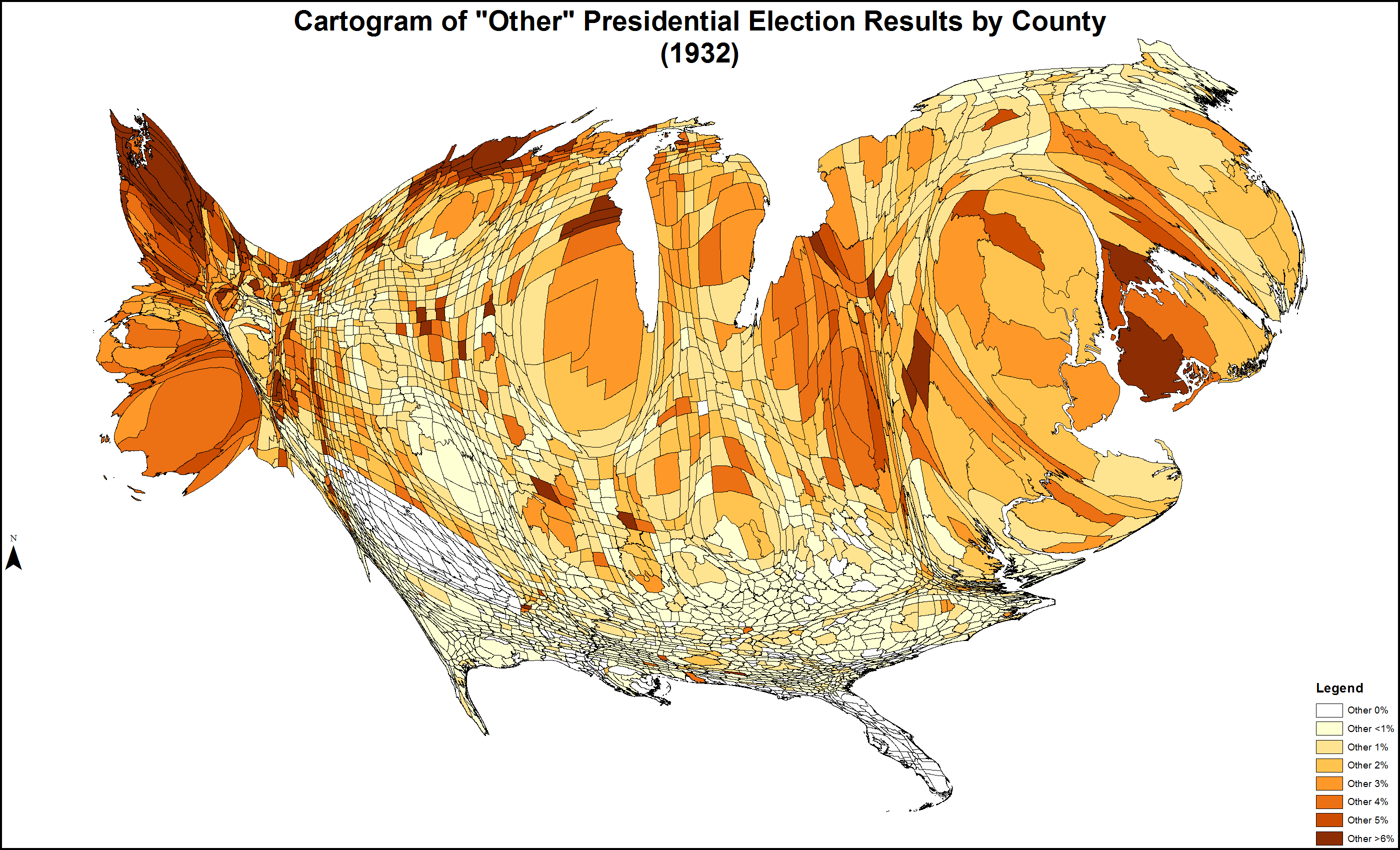
Cartogram of "other" presidential election results by county

State-level performance for Norman Thomas presidential campaign, 1932 (Socialist Party)

=== Results by state ===
States/districts won by Roosevelt/Garner
States/districts won by Hoover/Curtis

State	EV	Roosevelt/Garner Democratic			Hoover/Curtis Republican			Thomas/Maurer Socialist			Other			Margin		Total votes
State	EV	Votes	%	EV	Votes	%	EV	Votes	%	EV	Votes	%	EV	Votes	%	Total votes
Alabama	11	207,910	84.74	11	34,675	14.13	–	2,030	0.83	–	739	0.30	–	173,235	70.61	245,354
Arizona	3	79,264	67.03	3	36,104	30.53	–	2,618	2.21	–	265	0.22	–	43,160	36.50	118,251
Arkansas	9	189,602	85.96	9	28,467	12.91	–	1,269	0.58	–	1,224	0.55	–	161,135	73.06	220,562
California	22	1,324,157	58.39	22	847,902	37.39	–	63,299	2.79	–	32,608	1.44	–	476,255	21.00	2,267,966
Colorado	6	250,877	54.81	6	189,617	41.43	–	13,591	2.97	–	3,611	0.79	–	61,260	13.38	457,696
Connecticut	8	281,632	47.40	–	288,420	48.54	8	20,480	3.45	–	3,651	0.61	–	−6,788	−1.14	594,183
Delaware	3	54,319	48.11	–	57,073	50.55	3	1,376	1.22	–	133	0.12	–	−2,754	−2.44	112,901
Florida	7	206,307	74.68	7	69,170	25.04	–	775	0.28	–	–	–	–	137,137	49.64	276,252
Georgia	12	234,118	91.60	12	19,863	7.77	–	461	0.18	–	1,148	0.45	–	214,255	83.83	255,590
Idaho	4	109,479	58.66	4	71,417	38.27	–	526	0.28	–	5,203	2.79	–	38,062	20.39	186,625
Illinois	29	1,882,304	55.23	29	1,432,756	42.04	–	67,258	1.97	–	25,608	0.75	–	449,548	13.19	3,407,926
Indiana	14	862,054	54.67	14	677,184	42.94	–	21,388	1.36	–	16,301	1.03	–	184,870	11.72	1,576,927
Iowa	11	598,019	57.69	11	414,433	39.98	–	20,467	1.97	–	3,768	0.36	–	183,586	17.71	1,036,687
Kansas	9	424,204	53.56	9	349,498	44.13	–	18,276	2.31	–	–	–	–	74,706	9.43	791,978
Kentucky	11	580,574	59.06	11	394,716	40.15	–	3,853	0.39	–	3,920	0.40	–	185,858	18.91	983,063
Louisiana	10	249,418	92.79	10	18,853	7.01	–	–	–	–	533	0.20	–	230,565	85.77	268,804
Maine	5	128,907	43.19	–	166,631	55.83	5	2,489	0.83	–	417	0.14	–	−37,724	−12.64	298,444
Maryland	8	314,314	61.50	8	184,184	36.04	–	10,489	2.05	–	2,067	0.40	–	130,130	25.46	511,054
Massachusetts	17	800,148	50.64	17	736,959	46.64	–	34,305	2.17	–	8,702	0.55	–	63,189	4.00	1,580,114
Michigan	19	871,700	52.36	19	739,894	44.44	–	39,205	2.35	–	13,966	0.84	–	131,806	7.92	1,664,765
Minnesota	11	600,806	59.91	11	363,959	36.29	–	25,476	2.54	–	12,602	1.26	–	236,847	23.62	1,002,843
Mississippi	9	140,168	95.98	9	5,180	3.55	–	686	0.47	–	–	–	–	134,988	92.44	146,034
Missouri	15	1,025,406	63.69	15	564,713	35.08	–	16,374	1.02	–	3,401	0.21	–	460,693	28.62	1,609,894
Montana	4	127,286	58.80	4	78,078	36.07	–	7,891	3.65	–	3,224	1.49	–	49,208	22.73	216,479
Nebraska	7	359,082	62.98	7	201,177	35.29	–	9,876	1.73	–	2	0.00	–	157,905	27.70	570,137
Nevada	3	28,756	69.41	3	12,674	30.59	–	–	–	–	–	–	–	16,082	38.82	41,430
New Hampshire	4	100,680	48.99	–	103,629	50.42	4	947	0.46	–	264	0.13	–	−2,949	−1.43	205,520
New Jersey	16	806,394	49.49	16	775,406	47.59	–	42,988	2.64	–	4,719	0.29	–	30,988	1.90	1,629,507
New Mexico	3	95,089	62.72	3	54,217	35.76	–	1,776	1.17	–	524	0.35	–	40,872	26.96	151,606
New York	47	2,534,959	54.07	47	1,937,963	41.33	–	177,397	3.78	–	38,295	0.82	–	596,996	12.73	4,688,614
North Carolina	13	497,566	69.93	13	208,344	29.28	–	5,591	0.79	–	–	–	–	289,222	40.65	711,501
North Dakota	4	178,350	69.59	4	71,772	28.00	–	3,521	1.37	–	2,647	1.03	–	106,578	41.58	256,290
Ohio	26	1,301,695	49.88	26	1,227,319	47.03	–	64,094	2.46	–	16,620	0.64	–	74,376	2.85	2,609,728
Oklahoma	11	516,468	73.30	11	188,165	26.70	–	–	–	–	–	–	–	328,303	46.59	704,633
Oregon	5	213,871	57.99	5	136,019	36.88	–	15,450	4.19	–	3,468	0.94	–	77,852	21.11	368,808
Pennsylvania	36	1,295,948	45.33	–	1,453,540	50.84	36	91,223	3.19	–	18,466	0.65	–	−157,592	−5.51	2,859,177
Rhode Island	4	146,604	55.08	4	115,266	43.31	–	3,138	1.18	–	1,162	0.44	–	31,338	11.77	266,170
South Carolina	8	102,347	98.03	8	1,978	1.89	–	82	0.08	–	–	–	–	100,369	96.13	104,407
South Dakota	4	183,515	63.62	4	99,212	34.40	–	1,551	0.54	–	4,160	1.44	–	84,303	29.23	288,438
Tennessee	11	259,473	66.49	11	126,752	32.48	–	1,796	0.46	–	2,235	0.57	–	132,721	34.01	390,256
Texas	23	760,348	88.06	23	97,959	11.35	–	4,450	0.52	–	669	0.08	–	662,389	76.72	863,426
Utah	4	116,750	56.52	4	84,795	41.05	–	4,087	1.98	–	946	0.46	–	31,955	15.47	206,578
Vermont	3	56,266	41.08	–	78,984	57.66	3	1,533	1.12	–	197	0.14	–	−22,718	−16.58	136,980
Virginia	11	203,979	68.46	11	89,637	30.09	–	2,382	0.80	–	1,944	0.65	–	114,342	38.38	297,942
Washington	8	353,260	57.46	8	208,645	33.94	–	17,080	2.78	–	35,829	5.83	–	144,615	23.52	614,814
West Virginia	8	405,124	54.47	8	330,731	44.47	–	5,133	0.69	–	2,786	0.37	–	74,393	10.00	743,774
Wisconsin	12	707,410	63.46	12	347,741	31.19	–	53,379	4.79	–	6,278	0.56	–	359,669	32.26	1,114,808
Wyoming	3	54,370	56.07	3	39,583	40.82	–	2,829	2.92	–	180	0.19	–	14,787	15.25	96,962
Total	531	22,821,277	57.41	472	15,761,254	39.65	59	884,885	2.23	–	284,482	0.72		7,060,023	17.76	39,751,898
Total	531	Roosevelt/Garner Democratic			Hoover/Curtis Republican			Thomas/Maurer Socialist			Others			Margin		Total votes

==== States that flipped from Republican to Democratic ====
- Arizona
- California
- Colorado
- Florida
- Idaho
- Illinois
- Indiana
- Iowa
- Kansas
- Kentucky
- Maryland
- Michigan
- Minnesota
- Missouri
- Montana
- Nebraska
- Nevada
- New Jersey
- New Mexico
- New York
- North Carolina
- North Dakota
- Ohio
- Oklahoma
- Oregon
- South Dakota
- Tennessee
- Texas
- Utah
- Virginia
- Washington
- West Virginia
- Wisconsin
- Wyoming

==== Close states ====
Margin of victory less than 5% (74 electoral votes):

1. Connecticut, 1.14% (6,788 votes)
2. New Hampshire, 1.43% (2,949 votes)
3. New Jersey, 1.90% (30,988 votes)
4. Delaware, 2.44% (2,754 votes)
5. Ohio, 2.85% (74,376 votes)
6. Massachusetts, 4.00% (63,189 votes)

Margin of victory between 5% and 10% (64 electoral votes):

1. Pennsylvania, 5.51% (157,592 votes)
2. Michigan, 7.92% (131,806 votes)
3. Kansas, 9.43% (74,706 votes)

Tipping point state:

1. Iowa, 17.71% (183,586 votes)

==== Statistics ====
Counties with highest percent of vote (Democratic)

1. Wilkinson County, Georgia 100.00%
2. Armstrong County, South Dakota 100.00%
3. Lancaster County, South Carolina 99.84%
4. Sharkey County, Mississippi 99.82%
5. Colleton County, South Carolina 99.69%

Counties with highest percent of vote (Republican)

1. Johnson County, Tennessee 84.51%
2. Jackson County, Kentucky 84.28%
3. Leslie County, Kentucky 82.96%
4. Owsley County, Kentucky 79.08%
5. Sevier County, Tennessee 77.01%

Counties with highest percent of vote (Other)

1. Sheridan County, Montana 32.54%
2. Thurston County, Washington 23.12%
3. Clallam County, Washington 22.73%
4. Berks County, Pennsylvania 22.17%
5. Lake County, Minnesota 21.75%

== See also ==
- 1932 United States Senate elections
- 1932 United States House of Representatives elections
- 1932 Prohibition National Convention
- History of the United States (1917–1945)
- Timeline of the Great Depression
- Causes of the Great Depression
- Great Contraction
- First inauguration of Franklin D. Roosevelt
- Presidency of Franklin D. Roosevelt

== Works cited ==
- Sherman, Richard (1973). The Republican Party and Black America From McKinley to Hoover 1896–1933. University of Virginia Press. ISBN 0813904676.
