= Vanadium (disambiguation) =

Vanadium is a chemical element with symbol V and atomic number 23.

Vanadium may also refer to:

- Vanadium (band), an Italian heavy metal band
- Vanadium Corporation of America, a defunct chemical company
- Vanadium, a mobile-phone web browser developed by the GrapheneOS team

== See also ==
- V (disambiguation)
