= Donnel Foster Hewett =

Donnel Foster Hewett (June 24, 1881, Irwin, Pennsylvania – February 5, 1971) was an American geologist and mineralogist, known for his leading role in the 1905 discovery of the Minas Ragra vanadium ore deposit in Peru. This ore deposit was the world's principal source of vanadium for more than 30 years. Hewett, with Earl V. Shannon, described and named orientite, a mineral rich in manganese.

== Biography ==
D. Foster Hewett (known to friends and acquaintances as Foster Hewett) was born to George C. Hewett and Hetty Barclay Foster Hewett. George C. Hewett was an outstanding engineer in the coal-mining industry of Pennsylvania and West Virginia. Hetty Hewett died in 1884 when D. Foster Hewett was only three years old. He was raised until 1895 in Washington, D.C. in the household of Hetty Hewett's sister, who was married and had four children of her own. During the years from 1885 to 1893, George Hewett was in charge of operating mines in Colorado and Wyoming and generally visited his son once a year in Washington, D.C. In Colorado in the summers of 1888 and 1892, D. Foster Hewett visited his father, who encouraged him to study mineralogy. In 1895 George Hewett remarried and became an employee of the Southern Railway Company. D. Foster Hewett moved in 1895 with his father and step-mother to Atlanta, Georgis, and in autumn of that year entered the Georgia School of Technology (now renamed Georgia Institute of Technology). After a year and a half there, he dropped out to attend a local business college and in the autumn of 1897 was employed for several months as a stenographer and typist before some more education in Washington, D.C. In the autumn of 1898 he enrolled as a student of chemistry, metallurgy, and mining at Lehigh University. There he graduated in 1902 with a bachelor's degree in metallurgy and was taught and inspired by Joseph Barrell in geology and petrology, Joseph William Richards (1864–1921) in metallurgy and blowpiping, and John Lammey Stewart (1867–1927) in economics.

In 1903, after a year as an instructor in metallurgy and mineralogy at Lehigh University, Hewett became employed as a mining engineer for Pittsburgh Testing Laboratory, a company known for pioneering research on aluminum and Portland cement. From 1903 to 1909 Hewett investigated, mapped, and reported on mineral resources involving many commercially important minerals in the US, Mexico, Canada, and Peru. Most notably, he was primarily responsible for discovering the Minas Ragra vanadium ore deposit, thus revolutionizing the production of vanadium steel. In January 1909 he married Mary Amelia Hamilton. In 1909 he became a graduate student in geology at Yale University to study under his mentor and friend Joseph Barrell. After two years. he completed his residence requirements for a Ph.D. in geology, but his Ph.D. thesis and the award of the Ph.D. were delayed until 1924.

In spring 1911, Hewett took a three-day U.S. Civil Service examination and attained a high score. On the 1st of June, he joined the United States Geological Survey (USGS) as a Junior Geologist. Except for two leaves of absence, he spent the rest of his life as a USGS employee. His 1st assignment, which lasted about 2 years, was to do fieldwork with Charles Thomas Lupton (1878–1935) in the coal fields of Wyoming's Big Horn Basin. Hewett made important contributions to region's stratigraphy, discovered the Heart Mountain thrust fault, and demonstrated that bentonite is an alternation product of volcanic ash. He elucidated the systematic tilting of the Big Horn Basin's anticlines, and this research on the anticlines was later valuable to petroleum producers. Later USGS assignments were to Oklahoma for research on petroleum and manganese, to Oregon to study, with Joseph T. Pardee, gold ores in Oregon's Blue Mountains, and to Cuba to study ore deposits for manganese and iron. In June 1921, the American Journal of Science published Hewett and Shannon's discovery of a new mineral found in Cuba's Oriente Province. In autumn 1921 Hewett began an extensive mapping program for the geology and ore deposition of the southern Great Basin — the program, with various periods of interruption, occupied him until he was no longer fit for strenuous fieldwork. His Great Basin research started in Nevada's Goodsprings mining district. In 1924 Hewett announced his discovery of the close association of dolomitization with deposition of lead and zinc ores. This discovery soon became used as a guide by geologist all over the world to identify such ore deposits of lead and zinc. He subsequently demonstrated that some classic ore deposits in Europe were encased in hydrothermal dolomite like the Goodsprings ores, but some lead and zinc deposit, such as those associated with the mines of Laurium, have no dolomite mantles. After completing his study in the Goodsprings area, he did geological mapping of the much larger area of the Ivanpah Quadrangle, which covers about 3,900 square miles (10,100 square kilometers) in the northeastern part of the Mojave Desert of southeastern California and southern Nevada. There he demonstrated remarkable continuity between underlying Precambrian rocks and overlying Paleozoic rocks.

Many U.S. geologists often called Hewett "Mr. Manganese", because of his outstanding research in manganese mineralogy and ore deposition, which gained him international recognition. In 1912 Hewett had been given responsibility for preparing a chapter on manganese for the USGS's annual publication on mineral resources of the United States. For seven years he provided definitive summaries entitled “Manganese and Manganiferous Ores.” During WW I the USGS assigned him to evaluate manganese deposits in the US, because the German submarine campaign threatened to cut off the normal supply of manganese from South Africa and Brazil. He was also involved in study of manganese deposits in Arizona and Nevada, fieldwork in Alaska, and a resources survey of the parts of Nevada and Arizona around Hoover Dam.

Hewett gained a reputation for tact in dealing with people, as well as breadth of knowledge about geology and mineralogy. In 1933 Hewett was sent to investigate, in collaboration with Geoffrey W. Crickmay (1905–1971), the thermal waters of Warm Springs in Georgia. Many influential people, including Franklin D. Roosevelt, believed those particular waters had outstanding healing properties for unknown reasons. Hewett and Crickmay found that the spring waters had no exceptional physical or chemical properties and merely originated from rainfall that fell on a nearby mountain, went downward through a bed of permeable quartzite, and returned upward along a fault. A specially bound copy of their report Water-Supply Paper 819 was sent to President Franklin D. Roosevelt, but the report's receipt was never acknowledged.

In 1935 Hewett became Chief of the USGS's Metalliferous Geology Section and developed a program for the exploration of strategically important minerals and ores, which became of great importance during WW II. This work during WW II was interrupted by health problems and in 1945 he had to undergo kidney surgery. He and his wife settled in Pasadena, where Caltech offered him laboratory space, and from there he supervised and advised the USGS's mineral searches. In 1949 he was involved in the discovery of a large deposit of rare earths near Mountain Pass, California. There he identified and established the abundance of an ore deposit of the mineral bastnasite, which is scarce worldwide. Hewett was supposed to undergo mandatory retirement in 1951 when he became 70 years old, but an unsolicited executive order from President Harry S. Truman returned Hewett to USGS active duty with no terminal date. When he was no longer able to do much fieldwork, he continued his laboratory studies of manganese mineralogy. He worked with many specialists in sophisticated analytical techniques and shifted his headquarters to the USGS office in Menlo Park, California. There he remained remarkably productive until his death at age 89 — at the time of his death, two of his papers were in press.

D. Foster Hewett died in 1971 after more than 62 years of marriage. His widow, who often accompanied him in his geological fieldwork, died about 6 months later. He left a bequest which was used by Lehigh University to establish an annual Donnel Foster Hewett Lecture Series

== Awards and honors ==
Hewett, a long-time member of the Geological Society of America (GSA), served on the GSA Council from 1931 to 1933 and as GSA vice-president in 1935 and again in 1945. He served as president of the Society of Economic Geologists (SEG) in 1936. He was elected in 1937 a Member of the National Academy of Sciences and in 1950 a Member of the American Academy of Arts and Sciences. In 1942 he was awarded an honorary D.Sc. by Lehigh University. He received in 1951 the U.S. Department of the Interior's Distinguished Service Medal, in 1951 the SEG's Penrose Gold Medal, and in 1964 the GSA's Penrose Medal.

The vanadium minerals hewettite and metahewettite are named in his honor.

== Selected publications ==
=== Articles ===
- Hewett, D. F.; Schaller, W. T. (1925). "Hisingerite from Blaine County, Idaho". American Journal of Science. 10 (55): 29–38. Bibcode:1925AmJS...10...29H. doi:10.2475/ajs.s5-10.55.29.
- Hewett, D. F. (1928). "Late Tertiary Thrust Faults in the Mojave Desert, California". Proceedings of the National Academy of Sciences. 14 (1): 7–12. Bibcode:1928PNAS...14....7H. doi:10.1073/pnas.14.1.7. PMC 1085337. PMID 16587309.
- Hewett, Donnel Foster (1928). "Dolomitization and ore deposition". Economic Geology. 23 (8): 821–863. Bibcode:1928EcGeo..23..821H. doi:10.2113/gsecongeo.23.8.821.
- Hewett, Donnel Foster; Rove, Olaf N. (1930). "Occurrence and relations of alabandite". Economic Geology. 25 (1): 36–56. Bibcode:1930EcGeo..25...36H. doi:10.2113/gsecongeo.25.1.36.
- Hewett, D. F.; Crickmay, Geoffrey William (1937). "The warm springs of Georgia, their geologic relations and origin, a summary report" (PDF). Water Supply Paper. 819: 5. Bibcode:1937usgs.rept....5H. doi:10.3133/wsp819.
- Hewett, Donnel Foster; Fleischer, Michael (1960). "Deposits of the manganese oxides". Economic Geology. 55 (1): 1–55. Bibcode:1960EcGeo..55....1H. doi:10.2113/gsecongeo.55.1.1.
- Hewett, D. F.; Fleischer, Michael; Conklin, Nancy (1963). "Deposits of the manganese oxides; supplement". Economic Geology. 58 (1): 1–51. Bibcode:1963EcGeo..58....1H. doi:10.2113/gsecongeo.58.1.1.
- Hewett, D. F. (1964). "Veins of hypogene manganese oxide minerals in the southwestern United States". Economic Geology. 59 (8): 1429–1472. Bibcode:1964EcGeo..59.1429H. doi:10.2113/gsecongeo.59.8.1429.
- Hewett, D. F. (1966). "Stratified deposits of the oxides and carbonates of manganese". Economic Geology. 61 (3): 431–461. Bibcode:1966EcGeo..61..431H. doi:10.2113/gsecongeo.61.3.431.
- Hewett, D. F.; Radtke, A. S. (1967). "Silver-bearing black calcite in western mining districts". Economic Geology. 62 (1): 1–21. Bibcode:1967EcGeo..62....1H. doi:10.2113/gsecongeo.62.1.1.
- Hewett, D. F. (1972). "Manganite, Hausmannite, Braunite; Features, Modes of Origin". Economic Geology. 67 (1): 83–102. Bibcode:1972EcGeo..67...83H. doi:10.2113/gsecongeo.67.1.83.

=== Books ===
- Hewett, Donnell Foster (1926). Geology and Oil and Coal Resources of the Oregon Basin, Meeteetse and Grass Creek Basin Quadrangles, Wyoming.
- Hewett, Donnell Foster (1931). Geology and Ore Deposits of the Goodsprings Quadrangle, Nevada.
- Hewett, Donnel Foster (1956). Geology and Mineral Resources of the Ivanpah Quadrangle, California and Nevada.
