= Patrónite =

Sulfide mineral

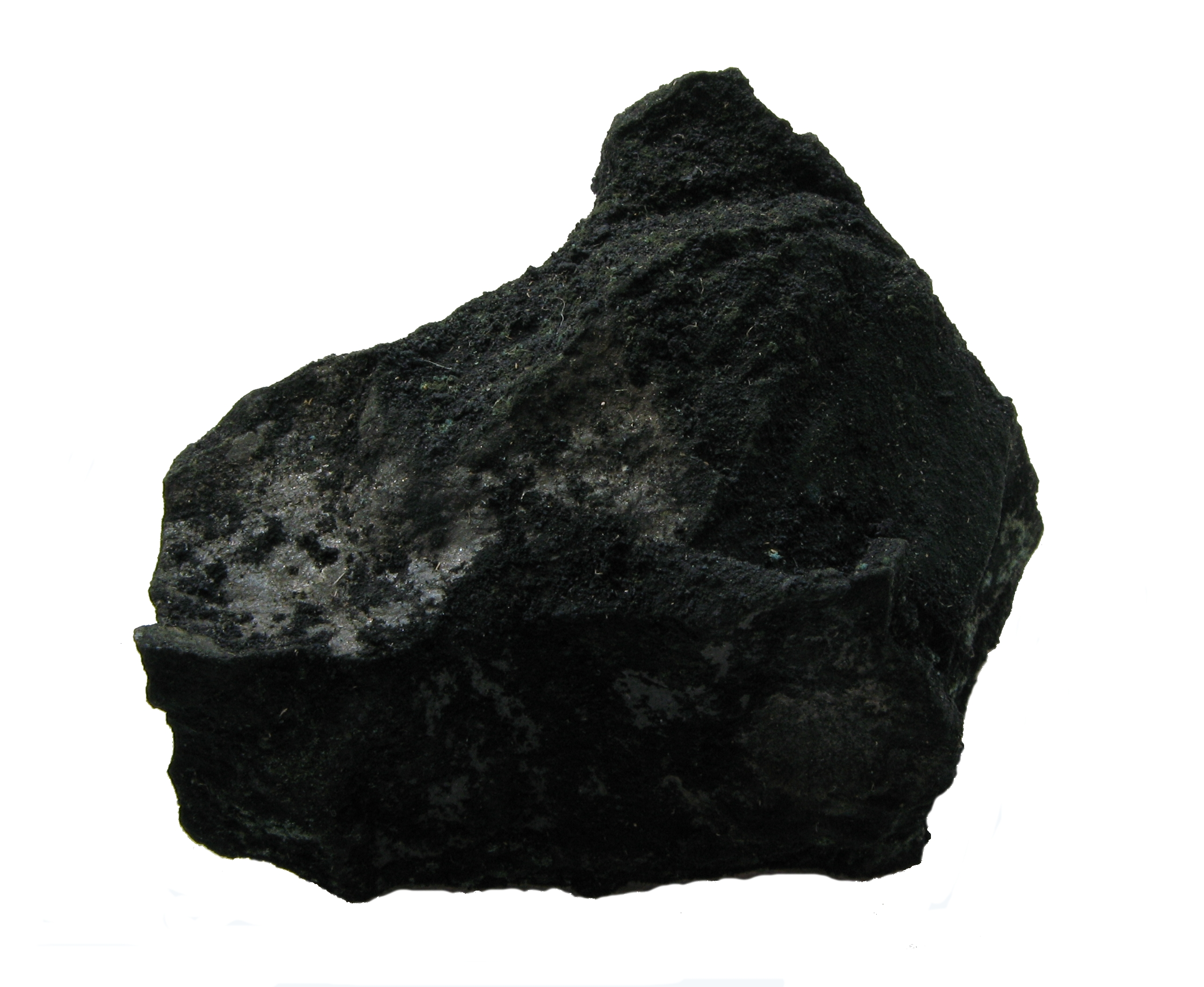
- Patronite from the Minas Ragra, Peru

General
- Category: Sulfide mineral
- Formula: VS_{4}
- IMA symbol: Pat
- Strunz classification: 2.EC.10
- Crystal system: Monoclinic
- Crystal class: Prismatic (2/m) (same H-M symbol)
- Space group: I2/c
- Unit cell: a = 12.11 Å, b = 10.42 Å, c = 6.78 Å; β = 100.8°; Z = 8

Identification
- Formula mass: 179.21 g/mol
- Color: Lead-gray on fresh surfaces to gray-black after exposure to air
- Crystal habit: Occurs as columnar crystal aggregates and in massive form
- Cleavage: Distinct columnar
- Mohs scale hardness: 2
- Luster: Metallic
- Streak: Black
- Diaphaneity: Opaque
- Specific gravity: 2.82
- Pleochroism: Strong

Patrónite is the vanadium sulfide mineral with formula VS_{4}. The material is usually described as V^{4+}(S_{2}^{2−})_{2}. Structurally, it is a "linear-chain" compound with alternating bonding and nonbonding contacts between the vanadium centers. The vanadium is octa-coordinated, which is an uncommon geometry for this metal.

The mineral was first described in 1906 for an occurrence in the Minas Ragra vanadium mine near Junín, Cerro de Pasco, Peru. It was named for Peruvian metallurgist Antenor Rizo-Patron (1866–1948) the discoverer of the deposit. At the type locality in Peru it occurs in fissures within a red shale likely derived from an asphaltum deposit. Associated minerals include, native sulfur, bravoite, pyrite, minasragrite, stanleyite, dwornikite, quartz and vanadium bearing lignite. It has also been reported from the Yushkinite gorge on the Middle Silova-Yakha River on the Paikhoi Range of the polar Urals of Russia and from the Tsumeb mine in Namibia.
