= Minas Ragra =

Vanadium mine in Pasco, Peru

Coordinates: 10.8595632°S 76.5720061°W

- Interactive map of Minas Ragra
- Location: Pasco Region, Peru
- Products: Vanadium
- Opened: 1906
- Closed: 1955

The Minas Ragra was a large vanadium mine in the Pasco Region of Peru. The deposit was discovered by a United States Geological Survey expedition on November 20. 1905. Members of this expeditions were Donnel Foster Hewett and José J. Bravo In this deposit the mineral patrónite was first discovered by a member of the expedition Antenor Rizo-Patron. A mine was established in very short time by the Vanadium Corporation of America. By 1914 75% of the world vanadium ore production was coming from the Minas Ragra in Peru, making the mine the world leading producer of vanadium. With the production of vanadium as side product of uranium mining from carnotite the mine had to close in 1955.

== See also ==
- Lluis Fontbote; G. Christian Amstutz; Miguel Cardozo; Esteban Cedillo; Jose Frutos (27 November 2013). Stratabound Ore Deposits in the Andes. Springer Science & Business Media. p. 595. ISBN 978-3-642-88282-1.
- Trefzger, Erwin F. (1951). "Vanadium lagerstätte Mina Ragra in Peru". Berichte der Naturforschenden Gesellschaft zu Freiburg I. Br (in German). DWI.
- Phillip Maxwell Busch (1961). Vanadium: A Materials Survey. U.S. Department of the Interior, Bureau of Mines.
- "The Story of Mina Ragra". Engineering and Mining Journal. McGraw Hill Publishing Company: 59. January 1947.
