= Towie (card game) =

Card game

Towie is a card game, a version of bridge adapted for three-hand card play, invented in Paris in 1931 by J. Leonard Replogle. Although the game is a three-hand game, it may also be played by four, five, or more players, though only three are active at any one time. Replogle co-wrote a rule book in 1934, and the game received some attention in the US in 1935, including five articles in Vanity Fair.
