= Vanadium Corporation of America =

- Company type: Commercial producer
- Predecessor: Primos Chemical Company (acquired 1919)
- Founded: 1906
- Founder: Joseph M. Flannery
- Headquarters: Pittsburgh, Pennsylvania, U.S.
- Key people: Joseph M. Flannery (Founder and chairman); J. Leonard Replogle (President)
- Products: Vanadium, ferroalloys

The Vanadium Corporation of America was a commercial producer of vanadium, a transition metal and a strengthening additive for steel. The company was founded in 1906 by Joseph M. Flannery and was headquartered in Pittsburgh, Pennsylvania. The company operated several vanadium mines in multiple countries, including Peru. The raw material was converted into a ferroalloy at its plant in Bridgeville, Pennsylvania.

By 1914, it was estimated that 75 percent of the world's vanadium ore production came from the American vanadium mine in Minas Ragra, Peru, making it one of the largest producers of the element in the world.

In August 1916, James J. Flannery sold the company but remained chairman of the board. J. Leonard Replogle headed the syndicate that took over the company and became president of the new firm, which retained its original name.

In 1919, the company acquired the Primos Chemical Company.
