= J. Leonard Replogle =

American industrialist (1876–1948)

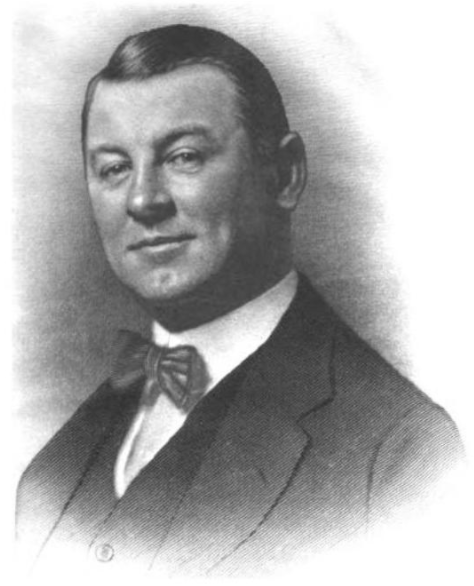
- Born: Jacob Leonard Replogle; May 6, 1876; New Enterprise, Pennsylvania
- Died: November 25, 1948 (aged 72); New York, New York
- Resting place: Grandview Cemetery, Johnstown
- Occupation: Industrialist
- Political party: Republican
- Spouse: Blanche Kenley McMillen (m. 1905)

Signature
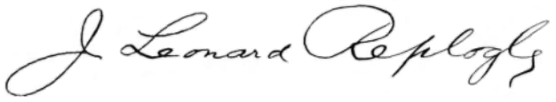

Jacob Leonard Replogle (May 6, 1876 – November 25, 1948), usually known as J. L. Replogle, was a wealthy American industrialist.

== Biography ==
J. Leonard Replogle was born in New Enterprise, Pennsylvania on May 6, 1876, one of twelve children of Rinehart Zook and Mary Ann (née Furry) Replogle. Rinehart was a Brethren minister, and moved his family away from New Enterprise to live in Johnstown. It was in Johnstown that Jacob grew up and went to school. Jacob quit his schooling when he was 13 years old, shortly after the Johnstown Flood, and went to work as a $5-per-week office boy in the general offices of the Cambria Steel Company.

He went on to become a general supervisor at Cambria, rising through the ranks to finally become the head of Replogle Steel Co. In 1918, Forbes magazine named him one of the wealthiest persons in the United States.

He married Blanche Kenley McMillen on January 10, 1905.

During World War I, he directed the steel supply for the War Industries Board, organizing the Sun Shipbuilding and Drydock Company of Chester with William Sproul, Samuel Vauclain of the Baldwin Locomotive Works, T. Coleman du Pont, and Edward V. Babcock of Pittsburgh. After the war, he was awarded the Distinguished Service Medal (U.S. Army). He did similar work for the War Production Board in World War II.

He was also head of the Vanadium Corporation of America, with Charles M. Schwab. In August 1942, the U.S. Army Corps of Engineers established the Manhattan Engineer District (MED), also known as the Manhattan Project, to develop atomic weapons and to procure the raw materials, principally uranium, necessary for their production. The MED contracted the Vanadium Corporation of America and the United States Vanadium Corporation (owned by Union Carbide) to procure and process uranium bearing ore.

While in Paris in 1931 he and a friend, Paulding Fosdick, invented a form of the game bridge, which they called Towie. In 1935, he sought to make Towie a popular game in the United States, with limited success.

The J. Leonard Replogle Elementary School in Loysburg, Pennsylvania is named after him.

In his later years he entered into Republican politics. He was Presidential Elector for Pennsylvania, 1920; a delegate to Republican National Convention from Florida, 1932, 1936, 1940, and 1944; and a member of Republican National Committee from Florida, 1940.

J. Leonard Replogle died at the Savoy-Plaza Hotel in New York on November 25, 1948. He was buried in Grandview Cemetery, Johnstown.
