= Henze =

Henze is a German surname. Notable people with the surname include:

- Albert Henze (1894–1979), German Wehrmacht general
- Frank Henze (born 1977), German slalom canoeist
- Gertrud Henze (1901–2014), a German supercentenarian
- Gregor Henze, German-American engineer
- Hans Werner Henze (1926–2012), German composer
- Jürgen Henze (born 1950), East German slalom canoeist
- Leon Henze (born 1992), German footballer
- Martin Henze (born 1981), a German astronomer and namesake of minor planet 6642 Henze
- Friedrich Wolfgang Martin Henze (1873 – 1956), a German chemist who first discovered vanadium-containing proteins known as vanabins in 1911
- Matthias Henze, the Isla Carroll and Perry E. Turner Professor of Hebrew Bible and Early Judaism at Rice University in Houston
- Paul Bernard Henze (1924—2011), CIA officer and national security specialist
- Richard Henze (1895–1985), a highly decorated Oberst of the Reserves in the Wehrmacht during World War II
- Stefan Henze (1981–2016), German slalom canoeist

== See also ==
- 6642 Henze, a minor planet named for German astronomer Martin Henze
- Henze Boekhout (1947–2024), Dutch artist/photographer
