= Hemovanadin =

Blood cell protein found in sea organisms

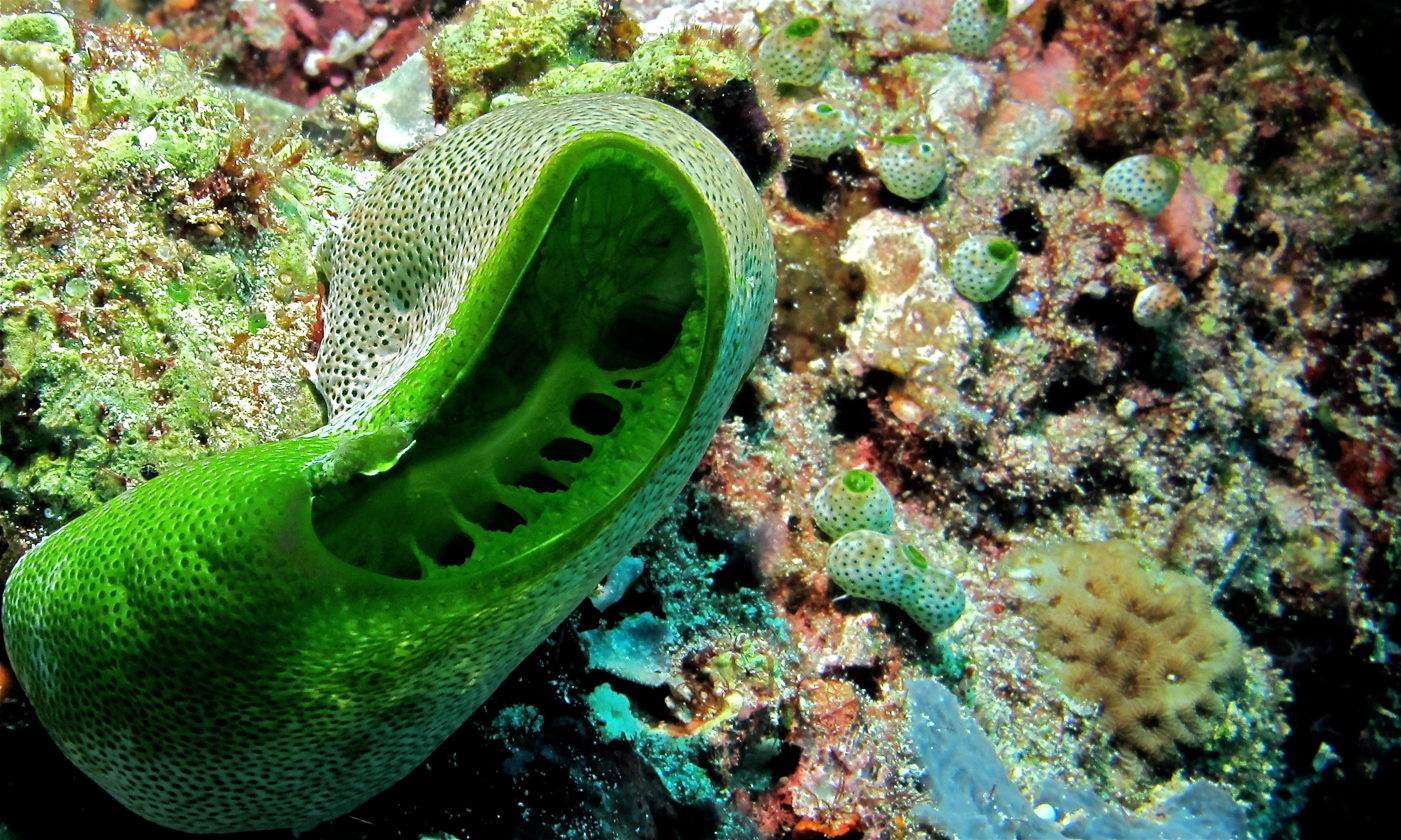
Sea squirt (Didemnum molle) off Sulawesi, Indonesia

Hemovanadin is a pale green vanabin protein found in the blood cells, called vanadocytes, of ascidians (sea squirts) and other organisms (particularly sea organisms). It is one of the few known vanadium-containing proteins. The German chemist Martin Henze first detected vanadium in ascidians (sea squirts) in 1911. Unlike hemocyanin and hemoglobin, hemovanadin is not an oxygen carrier.
