= Henzel =

Henzel is a surname. Notable people with the surname include:

- David Henzel, German entrepreneur and writer
- Dominik Henzel (born 1964), Czech-born Swedish actor and comedian
- Rafael Henzel (1973–2019), Brazilian radio broadcaster
- Richard Henzel (born 1949), American stage, film, TV and voice-over actor

== See also ==
- Henze, a German surname
- Henzell, a similar surname
