= Henzell =

Henzell is a surname. Notable people with the surname include:

- Marjorie Henzell (born 1948), Australian politician
- Perry Henzell (1936–2006), Jamaican film director
- William Henzell (born 1982), Australian Table Tennis player

== See also ==
- Henze, a German surname
- Henzel, a similar surname
