= Matthias Henze =

German theologian

- Born: Hanover, Germany
- Occupation: Professor of Religion
- Title: Isla Carroll and Perry E. Turner Professor of Hebrew Bible and Early Judaism

Academic background
- Education: Theological Colloquium, Kirchliche Hochschule Bethel, University of Heidelberg
- Alma mater: Harvard University (PhD)
- Thesis: (1997)

Academic work
- Discipline: Biblical studies
- Institutions: Rice University
- Notable works: A Companion to Biblical Interpretation in Early Judaism (2012)
- Website: http://henze.rice.edu

Matthias Henze is the Isla Carroll and Perry E. Turner Professor of Hebrew Bible and Early Judaism at Rice University in Houston, Texas.

== Early life and education ==
Matthias Henze was born in Hanover, Germany. Initially he studied at Theological Colloquium, Kirchliche Hochschule Bethel, Germany in 1986. Henze earned a Master of Divinity in Protestant Theology in 1992 from the University of Heidelberg, Germany, after which he emigrated to the United States. There he studied for a Ph.D. at Harvard University's Department of Near Eastern Languages and Civilizations.

== Career ==
After earning his doctorate in 1997, Henze joined Rice University's Department of Religion. He eventually became their Isla Carroll and Perry E. Turner Professor of Hebrew Bible and Early Judaism.

He has interests in the Hebrew Bible/Old Testament, Second Temple Jewish literature and culture, apocalyptic literature, Syriac language and literature, and the Qumran fragments. Additional he follows the history of biblical interpretation. Prominent also are his studies in 'Apocrypha' and 'Pseudepigrapha' writings.

Henze has authored and edited nine books. His most recent published research includes a monograph on 2 Baruch, a Jewish apocalypse from the late first century, titled Jewish Apocalypticism in Late First Century Israel: Reading Second Baruch in Context (Mohr Siebeck, 2011). He has written many scholarly articles, book chapters and encyclopedia entries. Currently he is working on a critical commentary on Second Baruch (CEJL; De Gruyter).

== Works ==
=== Books ===
- Henze, Matthias (1999). The Madness of King Nebuchadnezzar: the ancient Near Eastern origins and early history of interpretation of Daniel 4. Supplements to the Journal for the study of Judaism. Vol. 61. Leiden; Boston: Brill. ISBN 978-9-0041-1421-0. OCLC 41628213.
- ——— (2001). The Syriac Apocalypse of Daniel: introduction, text, and commentary. Studien und Texte zu Antike und Christentum. Vol. 11. Tübingen: Mohr Siebeck. ISBN 978-3-1614-7594-8. OCLC 48111935.
- ———, ed. (2005). Biblical Interpretation at Qumran. Studies in the Dead Sea Scrolls and Related Literature. Grand Rapids, MI: Eerdmans. ISBN 978-0-802-83937-4. OCLC 56592338.
- ———, ed. (2011). Hazon Gabriel: New Readings of the Gabriel Revelation. Early Judaism and Its Literature. Vol. 29. Atlanta, GA; Leiden: Society of Biblical Literature; Brill. ISBN 978-1-5898-3541-2. OCLC 706803964.
- ——— (2011). Jewish Apocalypticism in Late First Century Israel: Reading Second Baruch in Context. Texte und Studien zum antiken Judentum. Vol. 142. Tübingen: Mohr Siebeck. ISBN 978-3-1615-0859-2. OCLC 744284904.
- ——— (2012). A Companion to Biblical Interpretation in Early Judaism. Grand Rapids, MI: Eerdmans. ISBN 978-0-802-80388-7. OCLC 731009625.
- ———; Boccaccini, Gabriele, eds. (2013). Fourth Ezra and Second Baruch: Reconstruction After the Fall. Supplements to the Journal for the Study of Judaism. Vol. 164. Boston, MA: Brill. ISBN 978-9-0042-5867-9. OCLC 858940144.
- ———; Stone, Michael E. (2013). 4 Ezra and 2 Baruch: Translations, Introductions, and Notes. Minneapolis, MN: Fortress Press. ISBN 978-0-800-69968-0. OCLC 869919398.

=== Articles ===
- ——— (2005). "'A Scribe of all Signs of Wisdom': Reflections on George W. E. Nickelsburg in Perspective". Review of Rabbinic Judaism. 8 (1): 275–286. doi:10.1163/157007005774513891. hdl:1911/71052.
- ——— (2007). "The Reemergence of Second Temple Judaism in German Scholarship". Henoch. 29: 209–212.
- ——— (2008). "Qoheleth and the Syriac Apocalypse of Baruch". Vetus Testamentum. 58: 28–43. doi:10.1163/156853307X204600.
