= Gregor Henze =

German-American engineer

Gregor P. Henze is a German-American engineer.

Henze, a Berlin native, was a named a Fulbright Scholar in 1989, and resided in the United States from 1990 to 1991, where he completed his master's of science in mechanical engineering at Oregon State University in 1991. He subsequently earned his Diplom in mechanical engineering from Technische Universität Berlin in 1992, and returned to the United States to obtain a doctorate in civil engineering at the University of Colorado Boulder in 1995. Henze remained on the CU Boulder faculty, where he was later named Charles Victor Schelke Endowed Chair. From 2013, he has held a joint position at the National Renewable Energy Laboratory. In 2022, Henze was appointed a Fulbright Distinguished Chair at the Commonwealth Scientific and Industrial Research Organisation in Australia. Over the course of his career in the United States, Henze naturalized as an American citizen.
