= Vanabin =

Family of vanadium-binding proteins

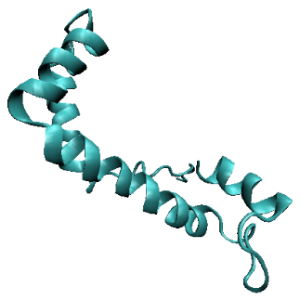
3-D representation of the structure of Vanabin2 from Ascisia sydneiensis var. samea

Vanabins (also known as vanadium-associated proteins or vanadium chromagen) are a group of vanadium-binding metalloproteins. Vanabins are found almost exclusively in the blood cells, or vanadocytes, of some tunicates (sea squirts), including the Ascidiacea. The vanabins extracted from tunicate vanadocytes are often called hemovanadins. These organisms are able to concentrate vanadium from the surrounding seawater, and vanabin proteins have been involved in collecting and accumulating this metal ion. At present there is no conclusive understanding of why these organisms collect vanadium.

Vanadium has been reported in high concentrations in the blood of the sea cucumber Stichopus. However, later research has found little or no vanadium in this and four other sea cucumber genera.

== Possible function ==
=== Vanabins as oxygen carriers ===
Because of the high concentration of vanadium in the blood, it has been assumed that vanabins are used for oxygen transport like iron-based hemoglobin or copper-based hemocyanin. Unfortunately no scientific evidence can be found to back this hypothesis.

The highest concentration of vanadium found so far, 350 mM, was found in the blood cells of Ascidia gemmata belonging to the suborder Phlebobranchia. This concentration is 10,000,000 times higher than that in seawater.

Vanabins accumulate vanadium in the blood cells and produce V(III) species and vanadyl ions (V(IV)) from orthovanadate ions (V(V)), with the use of NADPH as a reducing agent. Vanabins also transport the reduced vanadium species into the vacuoles of vanadocytes (vanadium-containing blood cells). The vacuoles are kept at a very acidic pH of 1.9 (due to sulfuric acid in it), made possible by pumping hydrogen ions into the vacuoles by use of energy intensive H^{+}-ATPase. All the use of NADPH and ATP to collect and maintain the vanadium is extremely energy intensive, unusual for oxygen transporting proteins.

Other oxygen transporting proteins have a very low dissociation constant with their metal prosthetic group and bind these groups tightly. Vanabins on the other hand have a moderate dissociation constant and do not tightly bind vanadium. Most importantly, because of this moderate dissociation constant, vanadium is usually found free-floating and separated from any proteins inside the vacuoles. This is completely different from other oxygen transporting proteins.

=== Vanabins not oxygen carriers ===
The most convincing evidence against vanadium in use for oxygen transport is that many ascidians and tunicates also have hemocyanin in their blood that could be assumed to handle all oxygen transport.

The use of vanabins and vanadium for oxygen transport in ascidians and tunicates is doubtful. Another hypothesized reason for these organisms collecting vanadium is to make themselves toxic to predators, parasites and microorganisms.

== History ==
German chemist Martin Henze discovered vanadium in ascidiaceans in 1911.
