= Leon Henze =

German footballer

Personal information
- Date of birth: 9 March 1992 (age 34)
- Place of birth: Wolfenbüttel, Germany
- Height: 1.78 m (5 ft 10 in)
- Position: Midfielder

Youth career
- TSV Rehstedt
- SV Reilingen/Neuhaus
- –2011: VfL Wolfsburg

Senior career*
Years	Team	Apps	(Gls)
2011–2013	Werder Bremen II	31	(0)
2013–2019	Lupo-Martini Wolfsburg		
- * Club domestic league appearances and goals

Leon Henze (born 9 March 1992) is a German former professional footballer who plays as a midfielder.
