= David Henzel =

German entrepreneur and writer

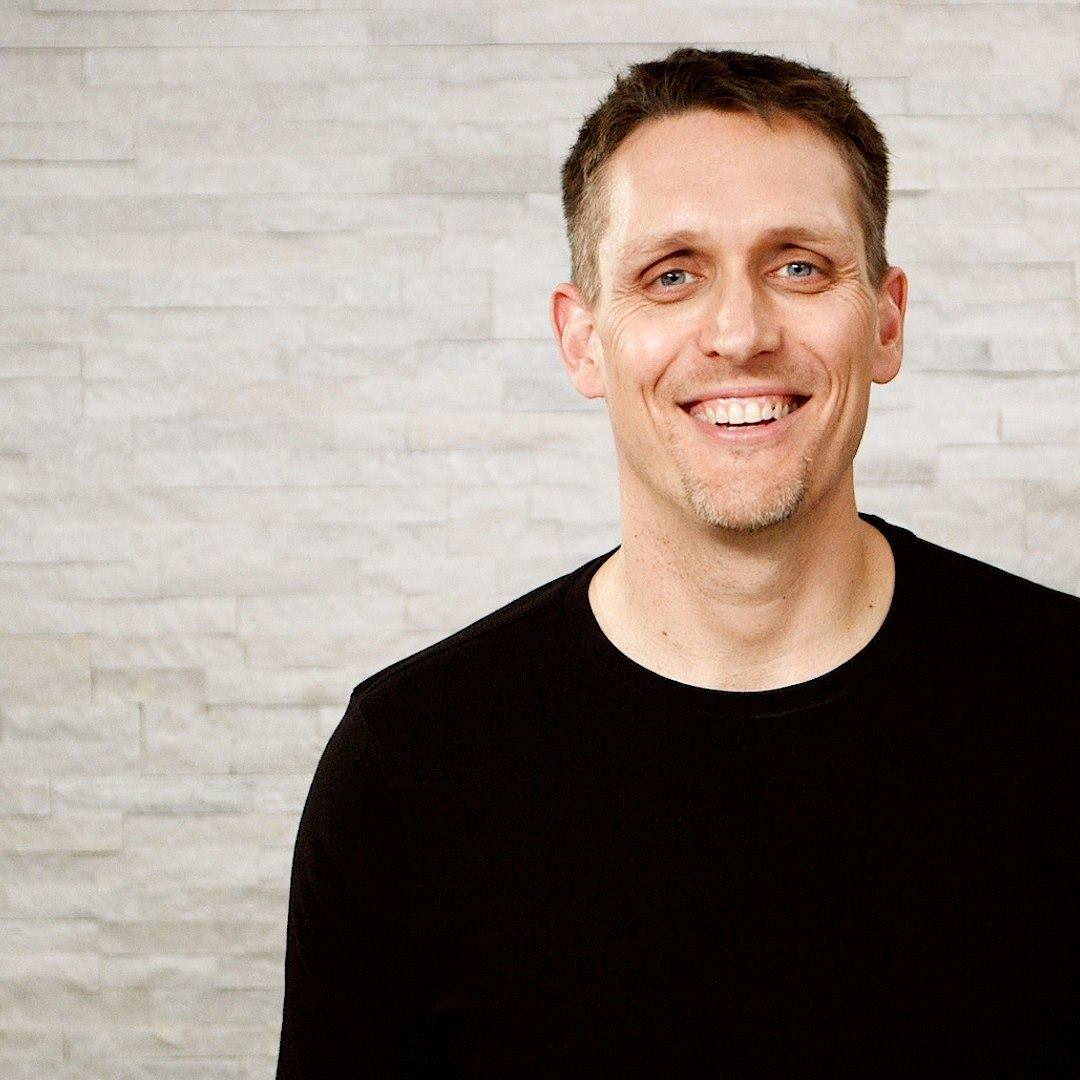
- Born: Germany
- Occupations: Entrepreneur, writer
- Known for: Co-founding MaxCDN
- Website: www.davidhenzel.com

David Henzel is a German entrepreneur and writer. He is the co-founder of MaxCDN, a Los Angeles based content delivery network.

== Personal life ==
David Henzel was born in Germany and moved to the United States in 2009.

== Career ==
Before he co-founded a content delivery network, Henzel started a variety of other businesses, including technology startups, e-commerce and a small store chain.

In 2002, he founded RMS, an information technology and services company. In 2009, he co-founded MaxCDN, a content delivery network (CDN) provider, based in Los Angeles with Christopher Ueland.

In 2013, MaxCDN was listed as the fifth largest CDN by Datanyze.com.

Henzel writes blogs for Huffington Post, FastCompany, and Inc., as well as for his own blog covering content delivery networks and entrepreneurship.

In 2017, he started an online course named Managing Happiness on how to eliminate stress and struggles in daily life.

In 2018, he acquired TaskDrive that provides lead research for companies.
