= Vanadocyte =

Vanadium-rich blood cell found in tunicates

A vanadocyte is a specialized type of blood cell found in ascidians (tunicates). These cells are notable for their high levels of vanadium (concentrations 10^{7} higher than that of seawater), which is typically a metabolic poison in other contexts.

== Structure and description ==
Vanadocytes are specialized blood cells found in marine tunicates. These cells are 8-13 μm in size and the cytoplasm contains many acidic globules, termed "vanadophores". These cells are one of several types found in the ascidian circulatory system and are abundant in the blood.

The cells are described as highly distinctive, with little variation between species. They have a circular outline that decays into a rosette form upon desiccation, with several inclusions that almost entirely fill the cell. The cell has a greenish color, varying from dark apple to scarcely perceptible, due to their vanadium complexes.

These green cells are not, as was initially believed, symbiotic zooxanthellae, although ascidians are known to have such symbiotes elsewhere.

== Chemistry ==
Vanadocytes are of interest to biologists and chemists because they contain high levels of vanadium and vacuole of sulfuric acid with acid mass fraction as high as 9 wt%, both of which are typically toxic to living creatures. Additionally, the vanadium complex itself is unstable, found almost exclusively in the air-oxidizable, +3 oxidation state.

== Function ==
The function of vanadocytes is still unclear. It has been proposed that the vanadocyte transports and processes nutrients, contributes to the polysaccharide external tunic, or serves as a defense mechanism. It is unlikely that the vanadium complex serves as an oxygen transport mechanism because it is unable to reversibly bind oxygen.

Research into their utility as anti-biofouling (allelopathic) mechanisms concluded that the high acidity and high vanadium levels function to significantly reduce epizoic recruitment and predation.
