= Friedrich Wolfgang Martin Henze =

German chemist

- Born: August 28, 1873
- Died: October 6, 1956 (aged 83); Pasadena, California
- Education: University of Leipzig
- Known for: discovery of Vanabins
- Scientific career
- Fields: chemistry,
- Workplaces: University of Innsbruck
- Doctoral advisor: Johannes Wislicenus

Friedrich Wolfgang Martin Henze (6 October 1873 – 28 August 1956) was a German chemist.

== Early life ==
Martin Henze was born the son of the sculptor and university professor Robert Henze (1827-1906). Henze studied in Bern, Leipzig and Heidelberg.

== Career ==
He worked with Johannes Wislicenus at the University of Leipzig where he received his PhD in 1897. In 1902 he was working at the deutsche Zoologische Station Neapel Stazione Zoologica Naples Italy together with Anton Dohrn. During this time he published his discovery of a vanadium containing compound in the blood cells of ascidiaceans. He left Italy shortly before World War I but rejoined the Institute in Naples in 1919. He became head of the medical chemistry department of the University of Innsbruck in 1921. Because of his opposition to the Nazis he was forced to retire early in 1938. After World War II he left Europe to live in the United States. He joined California Institute of Technology in Pasadena and became a US citizen in 1952.

== Family ==
He married Claire Barbara Foley in 1906, with her he had two sons Carlo (1907) and Robert (1908).

== Death ==
Henze died in 1956.
