= Rakovanite =

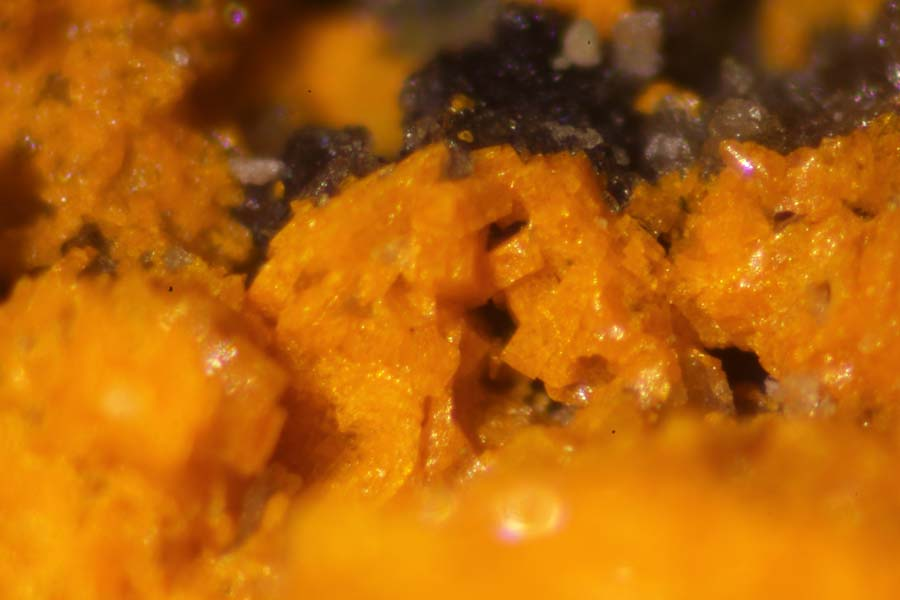
- Well formed rakovanite crystals from the type locality: Sunday Mine, Slick Rock Mining District, San Miguel County, Colorado.

General
- Category: Pascoite family
- Formula: (NH3)3Na3 [V10O28]12H2O
- IMA symbol: Rkv
- Strunz classification: 8.CJ.45
- Dana classification: 40.4.7.4
- Crystal system: Monoclinic
- Crystal class: Prismatic (2/m) (same H-M symbol)
- Space group: P2_{1}/n
- Unit cell: a = 12.0248(17), b = 17.121(3), c = 18.140(3) Å, β 106.242(8)°; Z = 4

Identification
- Color: Orange
- Crystal habit: Blocky to prismatic on [100]
- Fracture: Conchodial
- Tenacity: Brittle
- Mohs scale hardness: 1
- Luster: Subadamantine
- Streak: Orange-yellow
- Diaphaneity: Transparent
- Specific gravity: 2.407 (calculated)
- Optical properties: Biaxial (+)
- Refractive index: α_{589nm} = 1.776(5) β_{589nm} = 1.803(5) γ_{589nm} = 1.910(6)
- Birefringence: δ = 0.134
- Pleochroism: X light yellow, Y orangish yellow, Z yellowish orange, Z > Y> X
- 2V angle: 2Vz_{540nm} =58(1); 2Vz_{589nm} = 56(1); 2Vz_{650nm} =53(1)°
- Dispersion: r < v, strong parallel
- Other characteristics: Surface relief: very high Orientation: X + b; Z Λ c= 8° in obtuse β It does not fluorescence in long- or short-wave ultraviolent radiation.

Rakovanite, (NH_{4})_{3}Na_{3}(V_{10}O_{28}) · 12H_{2}O; formerly given as Na_{3}(H_{3}V_{10}O_{28})^{.}15H_{2}O; later, the ammonium ion was shown to be present and essential, is a member of the pascoite family. It is a transparent, brittle mineral occurring in the monoclinic crystal system. It is orange in color and has an orange-yellow colored streak. Rakovanite is soft with a Mohs hardness of 1 and a calculated density of 2.407g cm^{−3}. It does not fluoresce in long- or short-wave ultraviolet radiation. Rakovanite crystals are up to one mm in maximum dimension and vary in habit from blocky to prismatic on [001], commonly exhibiting steps and striations parallel to [001].

== Name ==
Its name honors John Rakovan, former professor, Department of Geology and Environmental Earth Science, Miami University, State Mineralogist and Senior Museum Curator, New Mexico Bureau of Geology and Mineral Resources.

== Occurrence ==
Rakovanite was found on specimens from the Sunday mine and the West Sunday mine, Slick Rock district, San Miguel County, Colorado, US.

It occurs as crystalline crusts on sandstone fractures in the mine walls of the Sunday and West Sunday mines. The best crystals were found perched on an amorphous dehydrated vanadium phase along with crystals tightly adhered to a corvusite-montroseite matrix.

It forms from the oxidation of montroseite-corvusite assemblages. It is associated calcite, corvusite, hewettite, hughesite, montroseite, munirite, paramontroseite, pascoite, rossite, sherwoodite, and other unidentified vanadium phases as well as at least two other potentially new decavanadate species. It forms aqueous solutions of relatively low pH when water reacts with pyrite in the deposit under ambient temperatures and generally oxidizing near-surface environments.

== Atomic arrangement ==
Rakovanite crystal unit consists of the decavanadate polyanion similar to that found in other decavanadate-bearing mineral. The decavanadate polyanion is formed of ten distorted, edge-sharing octahedra.

== Chemical composition ==
| Oxide | wt% | Normalized wt% |
|---|---|---|
| Na_{2}O | 8.08 (0.35) | 6.90 |
| K_{2}O | 0.25 (0.02) | 0.21 |
| (NH_{4})_{2}O | 6.03 (0.42) | 7.09 |
| CaO | 0.03 (0.01) | 0.03 |
| V_{2}O_{5} | 79.9 (0.56) | 70.08 |
| Al_{2}O_{3} | 0.05 (0.01) | 0.04 |
| H_{2}O | | 16.65 |
| Total | | 100.00 |

The empirical formula with calculated H_{2}O and (NH_{4})_{2}O contents is [(NH_{4})_{2.94}K_{0.06}]_{Σ3.00}(Na_{2.97}Al_{0.01} Ca_{0.01})_{Σ2.99}[V_{10}O_{28}]12H_{2}O (–0.01 H for charge balance) and the ideal formula is (NH_{3})_{3}Na_{3} [V_{10}O_{28}]12H_{2}O.

== See also ==
- Classification of minerals
- List of minerals
- Rakovanite on Mindat
