= Paramontroseite =

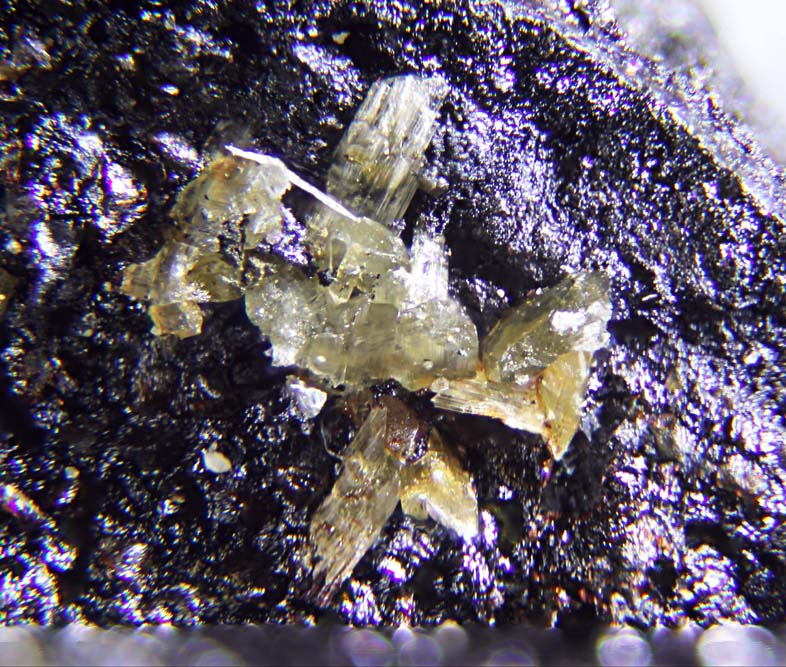
- Outstanding pale brown sharp crystals of the rare mineral paramontroseite, a simple vanadium oxide, from the type locality (Bitter Creek Mine, Long Park, Montrose County, Colorado, United States of America), on a contrasting dark matrix.

General
- Category: Oxide minerals
- Formula: VO_{2}
- IMA symbol: Pmto
- Strunz classification: 4.DB.15a
- Dana classification: 4.4.11.1
- Crystal system: Orthorhombic
- Space group: Pbnm (no. 62)
- Unit cell: a=4.905 b=9.422 c=2.916

Identification
- Color: Black to grayish black
- Luster: Submetallic
- Streak: Black

Paramontroseite (V^{4+}O_{2}) is a relatively rare orthorhombic vanadium oxide mineral in the Ramsdellite Group. Synthetic paramontroseite may have applications in medicine, batteries and electronics.

== Name ==
The name paramontroseite is derived from the Greek παρα (para), meaning near, and montroseite, a related mineral. The name was chosen due to the mineral's paramorphic relationship to the host mineral montroseite. Montroseite is named after Montrose County, Colorado, USA, where it was first found. (Note: Montrose County takes its name from the county seat, Montrose, which is named after the historical novel by Sir Walter Scott, A Legend of Montrose. Montrose, in Forfarshire, Scotland, is a corruption of the Gailic monadh-rois, meaning the hill of the ravine.) Names in other languages include Paramontroseit (German), paramontroseita (Spanish), парамонтрозеит (Russian) and 副黑钒矿 副黑铁钒矿 (Chinese). Synonyms are Inorganic Crystal Structure Database (ICSD) 22303 and Powder Diffraction File (PDF) 25-1003.

== Occurrence ==
Paramontroseite is associated with montroseite and corvusite. It is found in relatively unoxidized Colorado Plateau-type uranium–vanadium ores in sandstones. The type locality is Bitter Creek Mine, Paradox Valley, Uravan District, Montrose County, Colorado, USA. In the USA it is found in Montrose County, Colorado, San Miguel County, Colorado, Mesa County, Colorado, Emery County, Utah, Apache County, Arizona, McKinley County, New Mexico and Fall River County, South Dakota. It has also been reported from locations in the Czech Republic, Mendoza Province, Argentina and the Mounana uranium mine near Franceville, Gabon.

Paramontrosite has also been found in an outcrop on the Van Irvine Ranch in the Pumpkin Buttes area of Wyoming, USA, associated with sulfides in red sandstone. It is found in a zone where the sandstone changes color from red to gray. The black paramontroseite cements grains of sand into nodular masses that enclose smaller pyrite masses. The irregular concretionary masses are up to 1 foot (0.30 m) across. Vanadium salts have given a greenish coating to the exposed surfaces of these masses. The masses are anomalously radioactive and the surrounding sandstone is weakly radioactive. The radioactivity is mostly caused by tiny specks of coffinite in the paramontroseite. When a section is polished the paramontroseite completely fills the gaps between the grains of sand. It is very soft and has a gray color that is slightly lighter than quartz gray. There is strong anisotrophism and many bright multi-colored internal reflections.

Deposits of montroseite (V,Fe)OOH and paramontroseite VO_{2} have been found in the Saltwash Sandstone Member of the Upper Jurassic Morrison Formation in the Colorado Plateau. From the diffraction characteristics of the paramontroseite there seem to be two distinct generations: a primary paramontroseite with good crystalline structure and a product of montroseite oxidation with poor crystalline structure. The paramontroseite found in this region is among the neutral minerals in the mid-range of vanadium valence (+4) above the primary ore of montroseite (+3) but below minerals such as carnotite (+5) and pascoite (+5).

== Lifecycle ==
Paramontroseite is a metastable form of vanadium dioxide (VO_{2}) that results from oxidation of montroseite. It is formed by dehydrogenation of montroseite. Paramontroseite seems to be the most common initial product of oxidation of montroseite. The primary difference between the crystal structures of the two minerals is that the oxygen–oxygen distance increases from 2.63Å in montroseite to 3.87Å in paramontroseite due to the loss of hydrogen in the latter. The vanadium–oxygen distances are also somewhat shorter in paramontroseite than in montroseite, as would be expected when the vanadium is oxidized from +3 to +4 when the hydrogen is removed.

The montroseite, VO(OH), is deposited in crystalline masses in a sandstone matrix by some unknown process. Usually iron occurs in place of some of the vanadium. Oxygen in the air or groundwater then oxidizes the crystallised montroseite at temperatures under 50 °C through the reaction:

2VO(OH) + 1/2O_{2} → 2VO_{2} + H_{2}O

During the solid state alteration process the hydrogen atoms migrate through the crystal structure to the surface, where they combine with oxygen. In the process there is a slight shift in the crystal structure, but the structure remains intact. The vanadium-oxygen bonds have not been broken and the hexagonal close-packed oxygen framework has not been disrupted. In some cases there may be an intermediate "diffuse A" phase. The process by which montroseite is altered to paramontroseite seems analogous to the magnetite → maghemite, lepidocrocite → maghemite, and goethite → hematite processes.

Paramontroseite is not stable and is destroyed by weathering, replaced by minerals of the corvusite type. The paramontroseite reacts under neutral or acid conditions to form many compounds such as vanadyl vanadate and metal vanadates such as hewettite, hummerite, pascoite and rossite. Paramontroseite may dissolve in slightly alkaline conditions, then combine with Ca^{++} to form simplotite:

4VO_{2} + 2OH^{−} + Ca^{++} → CaV_{4}O_{9} + H_{2}O

== Possible applications ==
Autophagy is a process of cellular degradation that is essential in preserving homeostasis of cells. It is often thought that when autophagosomes encapsulate and trap inorganic nanoparticles they may be unable to degrade them and the cell's well-being may be threatened. However, experiments have shown that nanocrystals of paramontroseite induce cyto-protective autophagy in cultured HeLa cells. It is possible that this may have value in therapies.

Montroseite and paramontroseite microspheres have been synthesized by hydrothermal carbonization of sucrose and calcinated to form V_{2}O_{3}-VO_{2}-C core-shell microspheres. These have been used experimentally as cathode materials for a lithium-ion battery. Y. Xu and colleagues of the University of Science and Technology of China have shown that synthetic montroseite VOOH hollow structures can convert topochemically to paramontroseite without altering the size and appearance of the structures. Both forms appear to have potential in lithium-ion batteries as anode materials.

Monoclinic vanadium dioxide VO_{2}(M) is potentially of great value for applications such as intelligent temperature sensors and smart windows. The classic solid state transformation from vanadium precursors to rutile VO_{2}(R) is slow and costly. A transformation from goethite VOOH to synthetic "paramontroseite" VO_{2} to the desired monoclinic VO_{2}(M) promises to greatly reduce cost and time.

== Classification ==
Paramontroseite was first described before 1959. It is a member of the Ramsdellite Group. It is classified as follows:

- Strunz 8th edition: 4/F.08-30.
- Nickel-Strunz 10th edition: 4.DB.15a
- Dana 8th edition: 4.4.11.1
- Hey's CIM Reference: 7.12.3

== Properties ==
=== Physical ===
Physical properties of Paramontroseite include

| Empirical formula | V^{4+}O_{2} |
| Chemical formula | VO_{2} |
| Molecular mass | 82.94 gm (61.42% vanadium and 38.58% oxygen by weight). |
| Hardness | soft |
| Fracture | brittle |
| Cleavage | good |
| Density (g/cm^{3}) | 4 (measured), 4.095 (calculated) |
| Calculated electron density | 3.85 gm/cc |
| Calculated fermion index | 0.0017206735 |
| Calculated boson index | 0.9982793265 |
| Radioactive | no (Note: The RRUFF database shows Paramontroseite as radioactive.) |

=== Chemistry ===
The X-ray powder diffraction pattern for a Bitter Creek mine sample is 3.39 (100), 2.645 (50), 4.35 (35), 2.213 (35), 1.426 (35), 2.479 (25), 2.179 (25). In this sample the chemistry was:

| V_{2}O_{4} | 72.5 |
| V_{2}O_{3} | 10.5 |
| FeO | 8.8 |
| H_{2}O | 5.0 |

A sample from Matchless mine, Colorado, USA had chemistry:

| V_{2}O_{4} | 66.9 |
| SiO_{2} | 6.12 |
| Al_{2}O_{3} | 3.00 |
| V_{2}O_{3} | 11.10 |
| FeO | 8.26 |
| H_{2}O | 4.82 |

The measured chemistry of a microprobe fragment in the gray phase by the RRUFF project gave metals in the ratio: V^{4+} (82%), Fe^{3+} (9%), U^{6+} (4%) and Al (2%), with one metal atom per two oxygen atoms. The lightest phase was uranophane.

=== Optical ===
Paramontroseite is opaque and black to grayish black in color. (Note: Some sources simply give the color as "black".) Its optical class is biaxial. It has a sub-metallic luster and a black streak. From the Gladstone–Dale relation (KC = 0.393), the NCalc is 2.61 where Ncalc=Dcalc*KC+1, or 2.57 where Ncalc=Dmeas*KC+1.

=== Crystallography ===
Paramontroseite crystal properties include:

| Crystal structure | orthorhombic - dipyramidal |
| Cell dimensions | a = 4.905Å, b = 9.422Å, c = 2.916Å, Z = 4; V = 134.76 Den (Calc) = 4.09. |
| Ratio:a:b:c | 0.5205:1:0.3094. |
| Point group | 2/m 2/m 2/m. |
| Space group | Pbnm |
| Space group number | 62. |
| X-Ray diffraction by intensity (I/Io) | 3.39(1), 2.649(0.5), 4.35(0.35). |

== Endmatter ==
=== Sources ===
- Armbruster, Thomas; Danisi, Rosa Micaela (eds.), "Paramontroseite R050391", RRUFF database
- Barthelmy, Dave, "Paramontroseite Mineral Data", webmineral.com
- Barthelmy (b), David, "Montroseite Mineral Data", webmineral.com
- Changzheng, Wu; Feng, Feng; Jun, Feng; Jun, Dai; Jinlong, Yang; Yi, Xie (2011), "Ultrafast Solid-State Transformation Pathway from New-Phased Goethite VOOH to Paramontroseite VO2 to Rutile VO2(R)", J. Phys. Chem. C, 115 (3): 791–799, doi:10.1021/jp109967j
- Evans, Howard T. Jr. (1987), "The Crystal Chemistry and Mineralogy of Vanadium", Geological Survey professional paper, Govt. Print. Off.
- Evans, Howard T. Jr.; Mrose, Mary E. (1955), "A crystal Chemical Study of Montroseite and Paramontroseite" (PDF), American Mineralogist, 40
- Hailong, Fei; Xiaokun, Ding; Mingdeng, Wei; Kemei, Wei (November 2011), "Facile synthesis of Montroseite VOOH, Paramontroseite VO2 and V2O3-VO2 carbonaceous core-shell microspheres", Solid State Sciences, 13 (11): 2049–2054, Bibcode:2011SSSci..13.2049F, doi:10.1016/j.solidstatesciences.2011.09.009
- Garrels, R. M.; Pommer, A. M. (1987), "Some Quantitative Aspects of the Oxidation and Reduction of the Ores", Geological Survey professional paper, Govt. Print. Off.
- Heim, Michael (2007), Exploring Colorado Highways: Trip Trivia, Exploring America's Highway, ISBN 978-0-9777301-0-0
- "Paramontroseite" (PDF), Handbook of Mineralogy, Mineral Data Publishing
- "Paramontroseite", Mindat.org, Hudson Institute of Mineralogy
- Schorn, Stefan, "Paramontroseit", Mineralienatlas - Fossilienatlas (in German)
- Sharp, W.N.; McKay, E.J.; McKeown, F.A.; White, A.M. (1949), "Geology and Uranium Deposits of the Pumpkin Buttes Area of the Powder River Basin, Wyomong", Geological Survey Bulletin, U.S. Department of the Interior, Geological Survey; Washington, D.C.
- Smythe Palmer, A. (1882), Folk-Etymology, Ardent Media, GGKEY:NS8KWYGW93Y
- Wanty, Richard B.; Fitzpatrick, Joan J.; Goldhaber, Martin B. (1986), "Geochemical and Crystallographic Constrains on the Formation of the Vanadium-Uranium Ores of the Colorado Plateau", The Georges Bank Monitoring Program 1985: Analysis of Trace Metals in Bottom Sediments During the Third Year of Monitoring, The US Geological Survey
- Xu, Y. (2012-01-09), "From synthetic montroseite VOOH to topochemical paramontroseite VO2 and their applications in aqueous lithium ion batteries", Issues in Chemistry and General Chemical Research: 2011 Edition, ScholarlyEditions, ISBN 978-1-4649-6334-6
- Zhou, W; Miao, Y; Zhang, Y; Liu, L; Lin, J; Yang, JY; Xie, Y; Wen, L. (26 April 2013), "Induction of cyto-protective autophagy by paramontroseite VO2 nanocrystals", Nanotechnology, 24 (16) 165102, Bibcode:2013Nanot..24p5102Z, doi:10.1088/0957-4484/24/16/165102, PMID 23535229, S2CID 45273917
