= Vanadium(II) oxide =

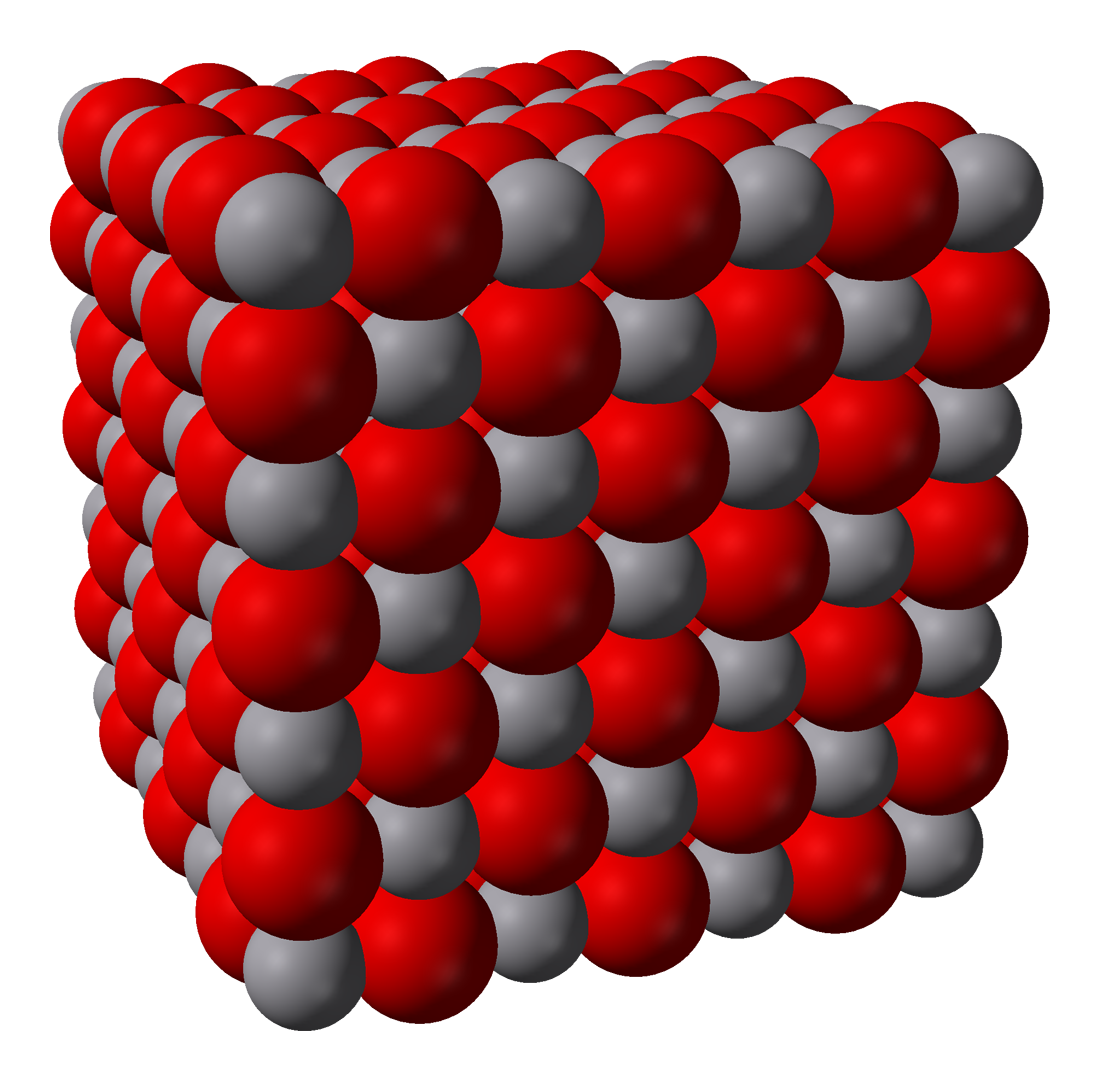

Names
- IUPAC name Vanadium(II) oxide
- Other names Vanadium oxide

Identifiers
CAS Number	12035-98-2
3D model (JSmol)	Interactive image
ChEBI	CHEBI:30044
ChemSpider	8139656
ECHA InfoCard	100.031.655
EC Number	234-834-3
Gmelin Reference	532274
PubChem CID	24411
CompTox Dashboard (EPA)	DTXSID6065189
- InChI: InChI=1S/O.V/q-2;+2 Key: UQCOXNBRZHICQC-UHFFFAOYSA-N
- SMILES: [V+2].[O-2]

Properties
Chemical formula	VO
Molar mass	66.9409 g/mol
Appearance	grey solid with metallic lustre
Density	5.758 g/cm^{3}
Melting point	1,789 °C (3,252 °F; 2,062 K)
Boiling point	2,627 °C (4,761 °F; 2,900 K)
Refractive index (n_{D})	1.5763

Structure
Crystal structure	Halite (cubic), cF8
Space group	Fm3̅m, No. 225
Coordination geometry	Octahedral (V^{2+}); Octahedral (O^{2−})

Thermochemistry
Std molar entropy (S^{⦵}_{298})	39.01 J/mol·K
Std enthalpy of formation (Δ_{f}H^{⦵}_{298})	−431.790 kJ/mol
Gibbs free energy (Δ_{f}G^{⦵})	−404.219 kJ/mol

Hazards
- GHS labelling
Pictograms	(GHS07: Exclamation mark) (GHS08: Health hazard)
Signal word	Danger
Hazard statements	H319, H332, H335, H372
Precautionary statements	P260, P264, P264+P265, P270, P271, P280, P304+P340, P305+P351+P338, P317, P319, P337+P317, P403+P233, P405, P501
Flash point	Non-flammable

Related compounds
Other anions	Vanadium monosulfide Vanadium monoselenide Vanadium monotelluride
Other cations	Niobium(II) oxide Tantalum(II) oxide
Related vanadium oxides	Vanadium(III) oxide Vanadium(IV) oxide Vanadium(V) oxide
- Except where otherwise noted, data are given for materials in their standard state (at 25 °C [77 °F], 100 kPa). verify (what is ?) Infobox references

Vanadium(II) oxide is the inorganic compound with the idealized formula VO. It is one of the several binary vanadium oxides. It adopts a distorted NaCl structure and contains weak V−V metal-to-metal bonds. VO is a semiconductor owing to delocalisation of electrons in the t_{2g} orbitals. VO is a non-stoichiometric compound, its composition varying from VO_{0.8} to VO_{1.3}.

Diatomic VO is one of the molecules found in the spectrum of relatively cool M-type stars. A potential use of vanadium(II) monoxide is as a molecular vapor in synthetic chemical reagents in low-temperature matrices.
