= VO2 =

VO2 may refer to:

- Vanadium(IV) oxide. a chemical compound
- VO2 max, the maximum rate of oxygen consumption as measured during incremental exercise
