= Magnesiopascoite =

Mineral discovered in 2008

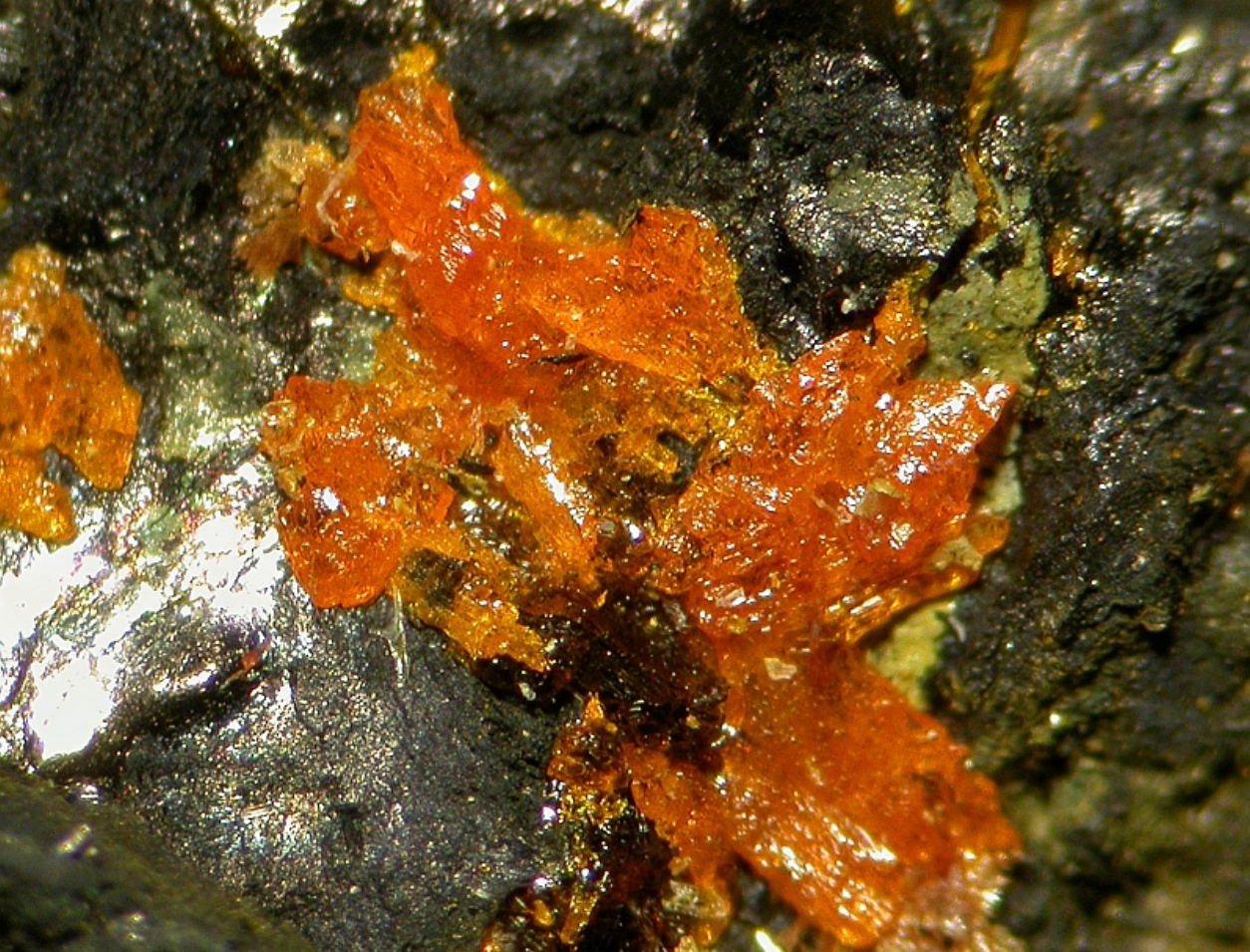

General
- Category: Vanadate minerals
- Formula: Ca_{2}Mg(V_{10}O_{28})·16H_{2}O
- IMA symbol: Mpas
- Strunz classification: 4.HC.05
- Dana classification: 47.3.6.3
- Crystal system: Monoclinic
- Crystal class: Prismatic (2/m) (same H-M symbol)
- Space group: C2/m
- Unit cell: a = 19.8442 Å, b = 9.9353 Å, c = 10.7149 Å β = 120.305°; Z = 2

Identification
- Color: Bright orange
- Twinning: None observed
- Cleavage: Perfect on {001}
- Fracture: Conchoidal, curved
- Tenacity: Brittle
- Mohs scale hardness: 2.5
- Luster: Adamantine
- Streak: Yellow
- Diaphaneity: Transparent
- Optical properties: Biaxial (-)
- Refractive index: n_{α} = 1.769(3) n_{β} = 1.802(3) n_{γ} = 1.807(3)
- Birefringence: δ = 0.038
- 2V angle: 45° (measured)
- Dispersion: r < v, crossed
- Solubility: Slowly in water Quickly in cold, dilute HCl

Magnesiopascoite is a bright orange mineral with formula Ca_{2}Mg(V_{10}O_{28})·16H_{2}O. It was discovered in the U.S. state of Utah and formally described in 2008. The mineral's name derives from its status as the magnesium analogue of pascoite.

== Description ==
Magnesiopascoite is a member of the pascoite group and is the magnesium analogue of pascoite. It is transparent and bright orange in color, occurring as intergrown, parallel stackings of crystals up to several millimeters in the largest dimension. The crystals vary from tabular to equant to prismatic. The mineral dissolves slowly in water and quickly in cold, dilute hydrochloric acid. It decomposes rapidly when mildly heated, likely as a result of dehydration.

== Structure and composition ==
The crystal structure of magnesiopascoite consists of the decavanadate anion (V_{10}O_{28})^{6−} and interstitial {Ca_{2}Mg(H_{2}O)_{16}}^{6+} consisting of Mg(H_{2}O)_{6} octahedra and seven-fold coordinated CaO_{2}(H_{2}O)5. The structure differs from that of pascoite primarily in cation coordination in the interstitial complex. In addition to calcium and magnesium, magnesiopascoite contains minute quantities of zinc and cobalt.

== History ==
Joe Marty discovered specimens of magnesiopascoite in San Juan County, Utah, in the Blue Cap mine and the nearby Vanadium Queen mine. The mineral was named "magnesiopascoite" because it is the magnesium analogue of pascoite. The mineral and name were approved by the IMA Commission on New Minerals, Nomenclature and Classification (IMA 2007-025). Magnesiopascoite was described in 2008 in the journal Canadian Mineralogist. The two cotype specimens are held at the Natural History Museum of Los Angeles County in the US State of California.

== Occurrence ==
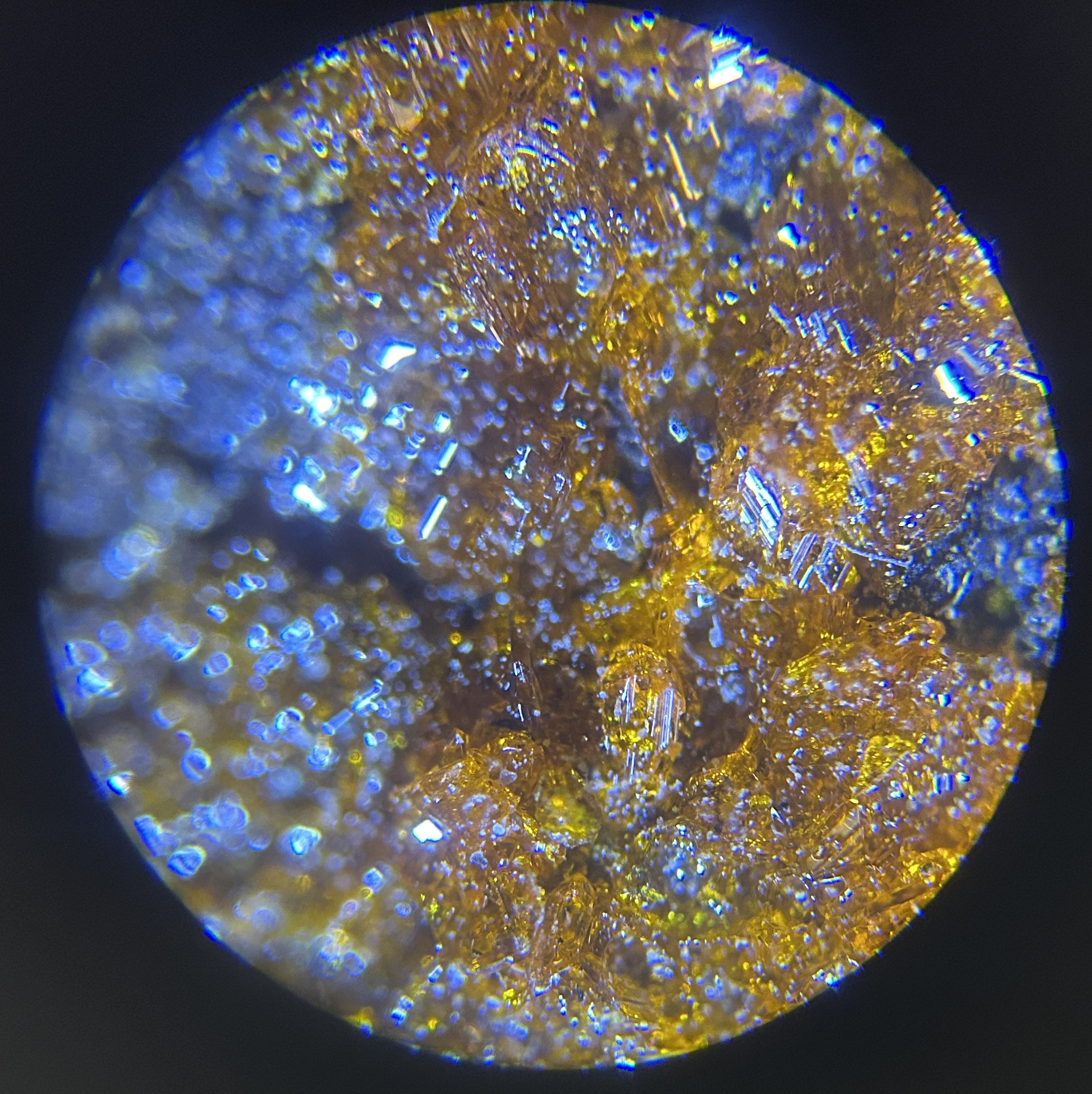
Magnesiopascoite containing uranium under 40x magnification

In the area of the type locality, the reducing environment caused by carbonaceous material in the Salt Wash and Brushy Basin members of the Morrison Formation precipitated uranium and vanadium minerals from solution. After mining, subsequent leaching and oxidation by groundwater created magnesiopascoite. The mineral has been found in association with gypsum, martyite, montroseite, pyrite and rossite.
