= Vanadium oxide =

Vanadium oxide mainly refers to:

- Vanadium(II) oxide (vanadium monoxide), VO
- Vanadium(III) oxide (vanadium sesquioxide or trioxide), V_{2}O_{3}
- Vanadium(IV) oxide (vanadium dioxide), VO_{2}
- Vanadium(V) oxide (vanadium pentoxide), V_{2}O_{5}

Various other distinct phases include:

- Phases with the general formula V_{n}O_{2n+1} exist between V_{2}O_{5} and VO_{2}. Called Wadsley phases. Examples of these phases include V_{3}O_{7}, V_{4}O_{9} and V_{6}O_{13}.
- Phases with the general formula V_{n}O_{2n−1} exist between VO_{2} and V_{2}O_{3}. Called Magnéli phases for Arne Magnéli, they are examples of crystallographic shear compounds based on the rutile structure. Examples of Magnéli phases include V_{4}O_{7}, V_{5}O_{9}, V_{6}O_{11}, V_{7}O_{13} and V_{8}O_{15}.
- V_{3}O_{5} appears as the mineral oxyvanite.

Many vanadium-oxygen phases are non-stoichiometric.
