= Pascoite =

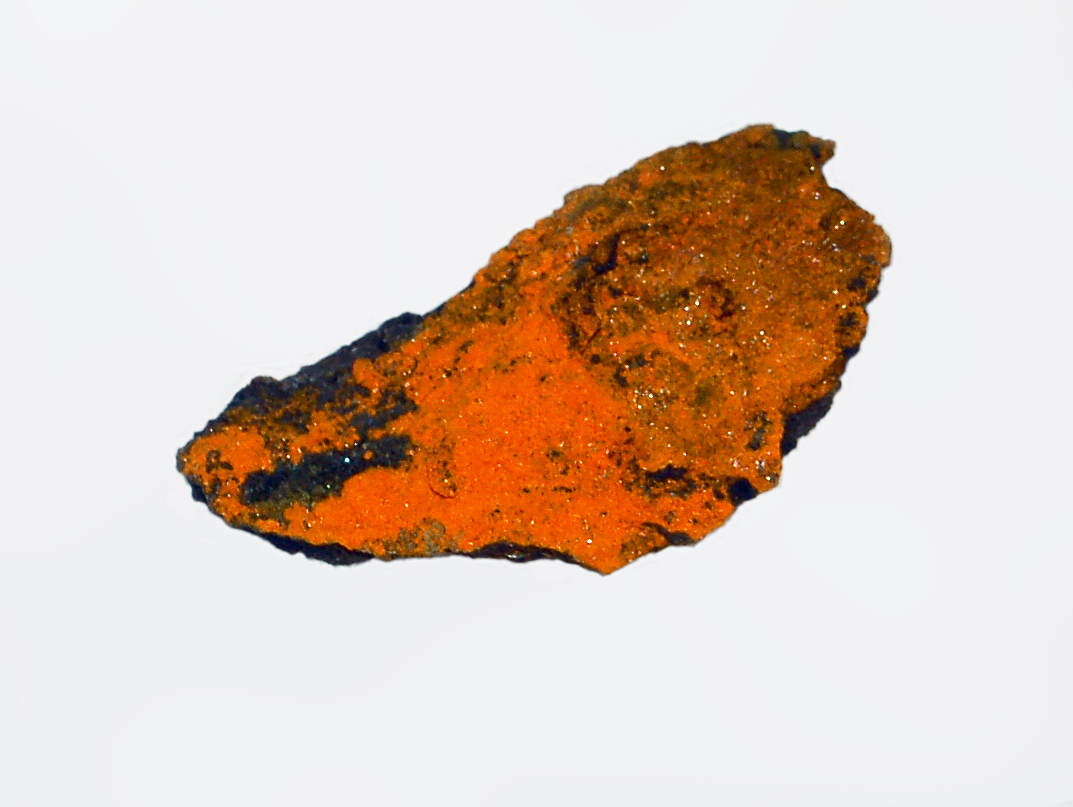
- Pascoite from D-day N. 2 mine, Utah, U.S.

General
- Category: Vanadate minerals
- Formula: Ca_{3}V_{10}O_{28}·17 H_{2}O
- IMA symbol: Pas
- Strunz classification: 4.HC.05
- Dana classification: 47.2.1.1
- Crystal system: Monoclinic
- Crystal class: Prismatic (2/m) (same H-M symbol)
- Space group: C2/m
- Unit cell: a = 16.834 Å, b = 10.156 Å, c = 10.921 Å, β = 93.13°; Z = 2

Identification
- Cleavage: Distinct on {010}
- Fracture: Conchoidal
- Mohs scale hardness: 2.5
- Luster: Sub-Adamantine, Vitreous
- Streak: Cadmium-yellow
- Diaphaneity: Translucent
- Density: 2.455 (measured)
- Optical properties: Biaxial (-)
- Refractive index: n_{α} = 1.775 n_{β} = 1.815 n_{γ} = 1.825
- Birefringence: δ = 0.050
- Pleochroism: Visible
- 2V angle: 50° to 56° (measured)
- Dispersion: r < v strong
- Solubility: Soluble in water

Pascoite is a mineral with formula Ca_{3}V_{10}O_{28}·17H_{2}O that is red-orange to yellow in color. It was discovered in the Pasco Province of Peru, for which it is named, and described in 1914.

== Description ==
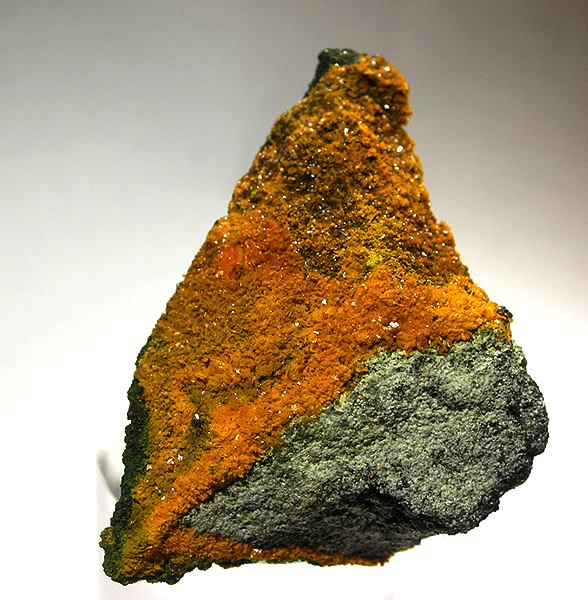
Pascoite from the Gypsum Valley District, San Miguel County, Colorado, United States

Crystals of pascoite, which occur in granular crusts, are minute and lath-like with oblique terminations. The mineral is dark red-orange to yellow-orange in color and dirty yellow when partially dehydrated. It occurs as efflorescences in mine tunnels or as a product leached out of surficial vanadium oxides by ground water. Pascoite has been found in association with carnotite.

Pascoite melts readily to form a deep red liquid.

Pascoite is a member of the eponymous pascoite group. The magnesium analogue of pascoite is magnesiopascoite.

== Structure ==
A 2005 study determined that pascoite has a C 2/m disordered crystal structure. It consists of decavanadate anions (V_{10}O_{28})^{6−} linked together by the interstitial complex {Ca_{3}(H_{2}O)_{17}}^{6+}.

== Synthesis ==
Pascoite can be easily synthesized by leaching oxides of calcium and vanadium with water to produce an orange-colored solution with an pH of about 4.6. Evaporation of the solution at room temperature produces orange-red crystals of the mineral. Dissolved pascoite can also be recrystallized from water.

== History ==
Pascoite was discovered in the Ragra mine near Cerro de Pasco, Peru, where the mineral formed on the walls of an exploratory tunnel after its excavation. The specimens were transported by D. Foster Hewett from Peru to the United States Geological Survey laboratory for analysis. Several years later, in 1914, pascoite was described in the Proceedings of the American Philosophical Society. It was named for the Pasco Province in which it was discovered.

== Distribution ==
Pascoite has been found in Argentina, the Czech Republic, Italy, Peru, the UK and the US. Several of the sites from which it has been reported are uranium mining districts. The type material is held in the United States at Harvard University in Massachusetts and the National Museum of Natural History in Washington, D.C.
