= Nitrogen-doped carbon nanotube =

Chemical compound

Nitrogen-doped carbon nanotubes (N-CNTs) can be produced through five main methods; chemical vapor deposition (CVD), high-temperature and high-pressure reactions, gas-solid reaction of amorphous carbon with NH_{3} at high temperature, solid reaction, and solvothermal synthesis.

== Details ==
N-CNTs can also be prepared by a CVD method of pyrolyzing melamine under Ar at elevated temperatures of 800–980 °C. However synthesis by CVD of melamine results in the formation of bamboo-structured CNTs. XPS spectra of grown N-CNTs reveal nitrogen in five main components, pyridinic nitrogen, pyrrolic nitrogen, quaternary nitrogen, and nitrogen oxides. Furthermore, synthesis temperature affects the type of nitrogen configuration.

Nitrogen doping plays a pivotal role in lithium storage, as it creates defects in the CNT walls allowing for Li ions to diffuse into interwall space. It also increases capacity by providing more favorable binding of N-doped sites. N-CNTs are also much more reactive to metal oxide nanoparticle deposition which can further enhance storage capacity, especially in anode materials for Li-ion batteries. However boron-doped nanotubes have been shown to make batteries with triple capacity.
