= Vanadium(II) sulfide =

Identifiers
CAS Number	12166-27-7
3D model (JSmol)	Interactive image
ChemSpider	74854
ECHA InfoCard	100.032.096
EC Number	235-319-6
PubChem CID	82959
CompTox Dashboard (EPA)	DTXSID1065265
- InChI: InChI=1S/S.V Key: ZFDNHUHPLXMMBR-UHFFFAOYSA-N
- SMILES: S=[V]

Properties
Chemical formula	SV
Molar mass	83.00 g·mol^{−1}
- Except where otherwise noted, data are given for materials in their standard state (at 25 °C [77 °F], 100 kPa). Infobox references

Vanadium(II) sulfide (also vanadium monosulfide) is an inorganic compound with the chemical formula VS.

== Properties ==
On heating to between 1,700–2,000 K (1,430–1,730 °C; 2,600–3,140 °F) VS evaporates forming VS molecules as well as atomic sulfur S and atomic vanadium V. Some VS_{2} and S_{2} molecules also appear in the gas phase.

The ground state of the VS molecule is C^{4}Σ^{−}; it has a dipole moment of 2.38 D. The excited state X^{4}Σ^{−} has a dipole moment of 5.16 D.

Bonding in VS is mostly covalent, and little charge is transferred from the vanadium atoms to the sulfur.

== Structure ==
Vanadium monosulfide has two different crystal structures, exhibiting dimorphism. The NiAs type is hexagonal (space group P6_{3}/mmc) while the MnP type is orthorhombic (s.g. Pcmm). The crystal form and unit cell dimensions vary with the sulfur to vanadium ratio. At the stoichiometric ratio, the stable structure is orthorhombic. As the S:V ratio increases, the c parameter decreases linearly. Over about S:V = 1.03 the b parameter increases and the a parameter decreases, suddenly converging to each other on 3.34 Å at a S:V ratio of 1.06. The most sulfur deficient orthorhombic form has the composition S_{0.93}V.

The crystal structure accommodates variations in the sulfur to vanadium ratio, by including vacancies. This means that the densest form is VS with a density of 4.90 g/cm^{3} while non-stoichiometric forms are less dense. Stoichimetric VS has the unit cell dimensions a = 5.825, b = 3.310 and c = 5.854 Å.

Stoichiometric VS changes crystal form at 630 °C (903 K; 1,166 °F) to the hexagonal form.

== Preparation ==
Vanadium monosulfide can be made by heating a mixture of finely powdered sulfur and vanadium in the correct ratio.

== Related compounds ==
In VS, vanadium can be substituted by titanium (V_{x}Ti_{1-x}S) in solid solution. Also, sulfur can be substituted by selenium (VS_{x}Se_{1-x}).

Other vanadium sulfides include V_{3}S, V_{5}S_{4}, V_{7}S_{8}, V_{3}S_{4}, V_{5}S_{8} V_{2}S_{3}, VS_{2}, VS_{4}.

Ternary sulfides containing vanadium in the +2 oxidation state include VSc_{2}S_{4}, VTi_{2}S_{4} and VCr_{2}S_{4}.
