= Vanadium(III) oxide =

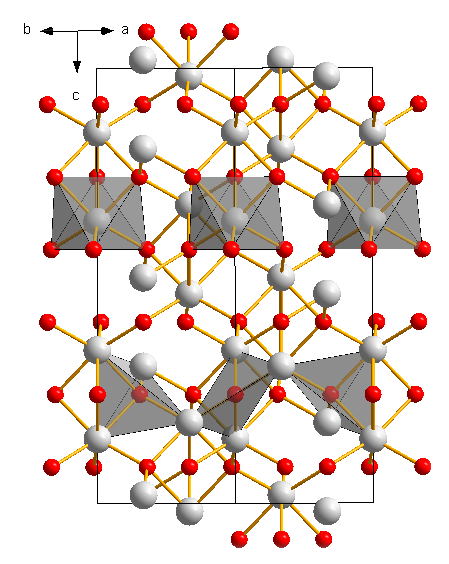
- Vanadium trioxide

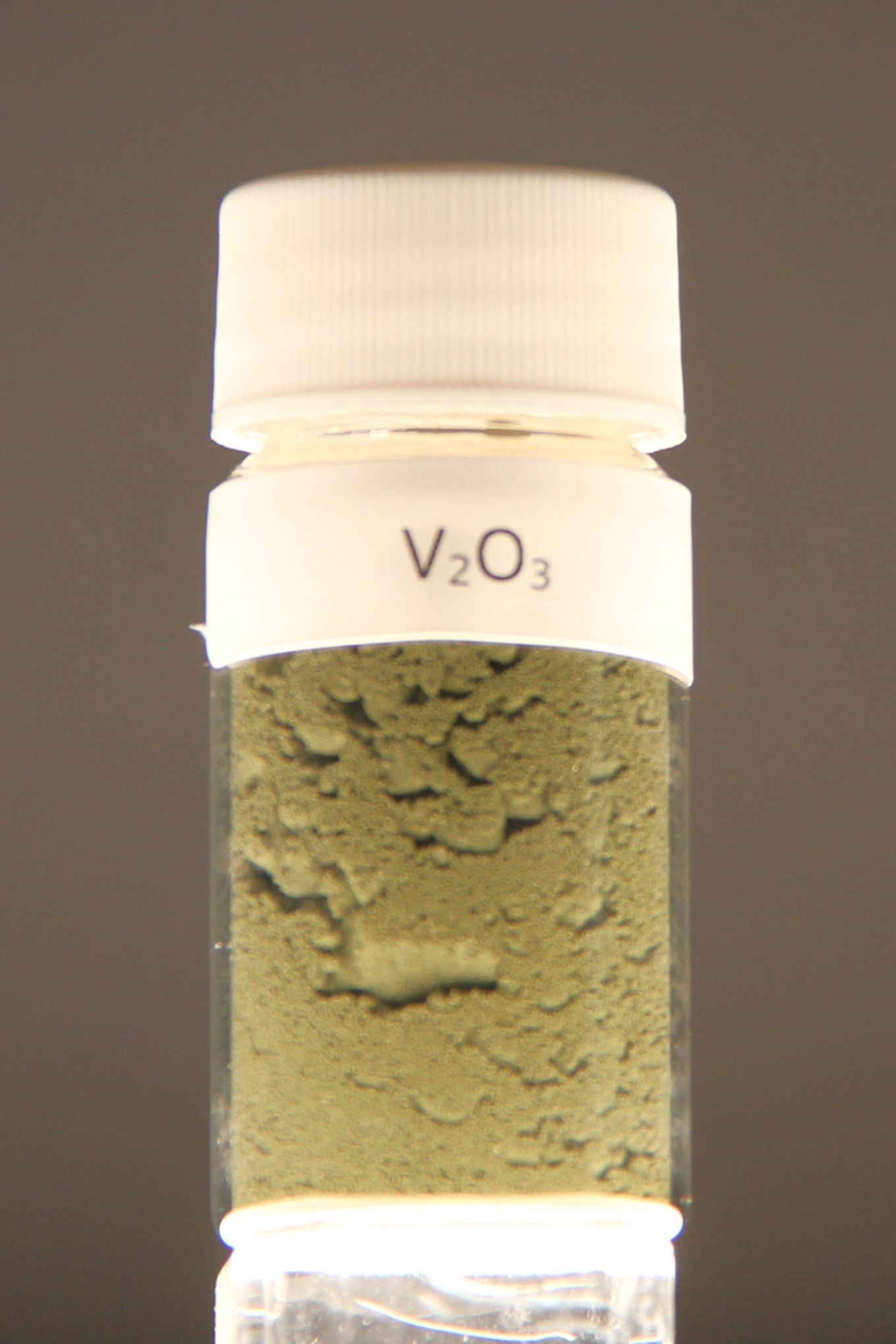
- Vanadium(III) oxide in a vial

Names
- Other names: Vanadium sesquioxide; Vanadium trioxide; Vanadic oxide

Identifiers
| CAS Number | 1314-34-7 |
| 3D model (JSmol) | Interactive image |
| ChemSpider | 11575285 |
| ECHA InfoCard | 100.013.847 |
| PubChem CID | 518710 |
| RTECS number | YW3050000 |
| UNII | Y469L16CWH |
| CompTox Dashboard (EPA) | DTXSID90892259 |
- InChI: InChI=1S/3O.2V Key: KFAFTZQGYMGWLU-UHFFFAOYSA-N
- SMILES: [O-2].[V+3].[O-2].[V+3].[O-2]

Properties
| Chemical formula | V_{2}O_{3} |
| Molar mass | 149.881 g/mol |
| Appearance | Black powder |
| Density | 4.87 g/cm^{3} |
| Melting point | 1,940 °C (3,520 °F; 2,210 K) |
| Solubility in water | Insoluble |
| Solubility in acids | soluble with difficulty |
| Magnetic susceptibility (χ) | +1976.0·10^{−6} cm^{3}/mol |

Structure
| Crystal structure | Corundum, hR30 |
| Space group | R3̅c (No. 167) |
| Lattice constant | a = 547 pm α = 53.74°, β = 90°, γ = 90° |

Thermochemistry
| Std molar entropy (S^{⦵}_{298}) | 98.07 J/mol·K |
| Std enthalpy of formation (Δ_{f}H^{⦵}_{298}) | −1218.800 kJ/mol |
| Gibbs free energy (Δ_{f}G^{⦵}) | −1139.052 kJ/mol |

Hazards
- GHS labelling
| Pictograms | (GHS07: Exclamation mark) |
| Signal word | Warning |
| Hazard statements | H315, H319, H332, H335 |
| Precautionary statements | P261, P264, P264+P265, P271, P280, P302+P352, P304+P340, P305+P351+P338, P317, P319, P321, P332+P317, P337+P317, P362+P364, P403+P233, P405, P501 |
- Except where otherwise noted, data are given for materials in their standard state (at 25 °C [77 °F], 100 kPa). verify (what is ?) Infobox references

Vanadium(III) oxide is the inorganic compound with the chemical formula V_{2}O_{3}. It is a black basic oxide dissolving in acids to give solutions of vanadium(III) complexes. Upon exposure to air it gradually converts into indigo-blue VO_{2}. It occurs as the rare mineral karelianite.

== Structure ==
V_{2}O_{3} has the corundum structure. It is antiferromagnetic with a critical temperature of 160 K, below which there is an abrupt change in conductivity from metallic to insulating. This also distorts the crystal structure to a monoclinic space group: C2/c.

== Preparation ==
Vanadium(III) oxide can be prepared by reduction, oxidation, and hydrothermal synthesis (used for crystal growth).

In the reduction method, V_{2}O_{5} is treated with hydrogen, carbon monoxide, or ammonia gas.

== Uses ==
=== Energy storage ===
Vanadium(III) oxide is a suitable cathode material for aqueous zinc metal batteries.

It is of research interest in the form of porous N-doped carbon nanofibers (PNCNFs), which are suitable for lithium-ion storage. The storage of other ions such as potassium has also been investigated.

Vanadium oxides such as V_{2}O_{3} possess four readily accessible valence states, making them suitable candidates for pseudocapacitive electrodes in energy storage applications.

=== Catalysis ===
Vanadium(III) oxide and its composites have been used as catalysts for chemical looping reforming of methane, ammonium perchlorate decomposition, the hydrogen evolution reaction (HER), the oxygen evolution reaction (OER), and water splitting.
