= Vanadium(IV) oxide =

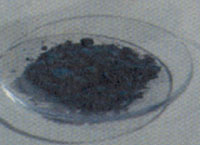
- VO_{2} powder

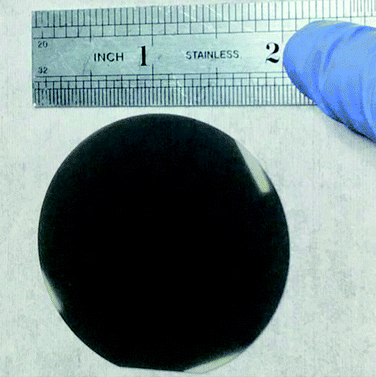
- Crystalline VO_{2} film on sapphire

Names
- IUPAC name Vanadium(IV) oxide
- Other names Vanadium dioxide Divanadium tetroxide

Identifiers
CAS Number	12036-21-4
3D model (JSmol)	Interactive image
ChEBI	CHEBI:30047
ChemSpider	74761
ECHA InfoCard	100.031.661
EC Number	234-841-1
Gmelin Reference	873472
PubChem CID	82849
CompTox Dashboard (EPA)	DTXSID5065194
- InChI: InChI=1S/2O.V Key: GRUMUEUJTSXQOI-UHFFFAOYSA-N
- SMILES: O=[V]=O

Properties
Chemical formula	VO_{2}
Molar mass	82.94 g/mol
Appearance	Blue-black powder
Density	4.571 g/cm^{3} (monoclinic); 4.653 g/cm^{3} (tetragonal)
Melting point	1,967 °C (2,240 K)
Magnetic susceptibility (χ)	+99.0·10^{−6} cm^{3}/mol

Structure
Crystal structure	Distorted rutile (<70 °C (343 K), monoclinic); Rutile (>70 °C (343 K), tetragonal)

Hazards
- Occupational safety and health (OHS/OSH)
Main hazards	toxic
- GHS labelling
Pictograms	(GHS07: Exclamation mark)
Signal word	Warning
Hazard statements	H315, H319
Precautionary statements	P264, P280, P302+P352, P305+P351+P338, P332+P313, P337+P313, P362
NFPA 704 (fire diamond)	3 0 0
Flash point	Non-flammable

Related compounds
Other anions	Vanadium disulfide Vanadium diselenide Vanadium ditelluride
Other cations	Niobium(IV) oxide Tantalum(IV) oxide
Related vanadium oxides	Vanadium(II) oxide Vanadium(III) oxide Vanadium(V) oxide
- Except where otherwise noted, data are given for materials in their standard state (at 25 °C [77 °F], 100 kPa). verify (what is ?) Infobox references

Vanadium(IV) oxide or vanadium dioxide is an inorganic compound with the formula VO_{2}. It is a dark blue solid. Vanadium(IV) dioxide is amphoteric, dissolving in non-oxidising acids to give the blue vanadyl ion, [VO]^{2+} and in alkali to give the brown [V_{4}O_{9}]^{2−} ion, or at high pH [VO_{4}]^{4−}. VO_{2} has a phase transition at 68 °C (341 K). Electrical resistivity, opacity, etc, can change by several orders of magnitude. Owing to these properties, it has been used in surface coating, sensors, and imaging. Potential applications include use in memory devices, phase-change switches, passive radiative cooling applications, such as smart windows and roofs, that cool or warm depending on temperature, aerospace communication systems and neuromorphic computing. It occurs in nature as the mineral paramontroseite.

== Properties ==
=== Structure ===
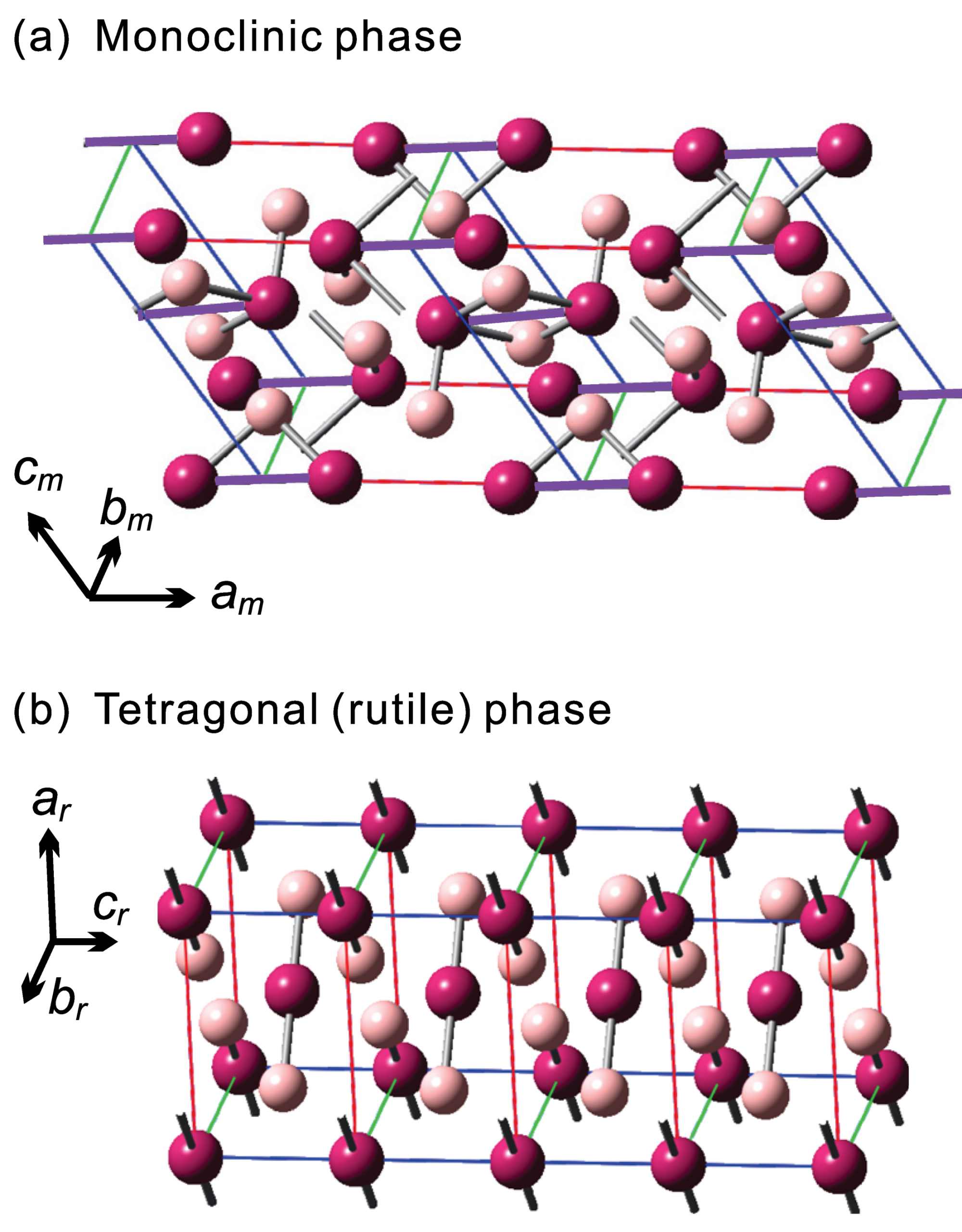
VO_{2} structure. Vanadium atoms are purple and oxygen atoms are pink. The V–V dimers are highlighted by violet lines in (a). The distances between adjacent vanadium atoms are equal in (b).

At temperatures below T_{c} = 340 K (67 °C), VO_{2} has a monoclinic (space group P2_{1}/c) crystal structure. Above T_{c}, the structure is tetragonal, like rutile TiO_{2}. In the monoclinic phase, the V^{4+} ions form pairs along the c axis, leading to alternate short and long V-V distances of 2.65 Å and 3.12 Å. In comparison, in the rutile phase the V^{4+} ions are separated by a fixed distance of 2.96 Å. As a result, the number of V^{4+} ions in the crystallographic unit cell doubles from the rutile to the monoclinic phase.

The equilibrium morphology of rutile VO_{2} particles is acicular, laterally confined by (110) surfaces, which are the most stable termination planes. The surface tends to be oxidized with respect to the stoichiometric composition, with the oxygen adsorbed on the (110) surface forming vanadyl species. The presence of V^{5+} ions at the surface of VO_{2} films has been confirmed by X-ray photoelectron spectroscopy.

==== Memory effect ====
In 2022, a to date unique and unknown feature of the material was reported – it can "remember" previous external stimuli (via structural rather than electronic states), with potential for e.g. data storage and processing, potentially including in neuromorphic computing.

=== Electronic ===
At the rutile to monoclinic transition temperature (67 °C (340 K)), VO_{2} also exhibits a metal to semiconductor transition in its electronic structure: the rutile phase is metallic while the monoclinic phase is semiconducting. The optical band gap of VO_{2} in the low-temperature monoclinic phase is about 0.7 eV.

=== Thermal ===
Metallic VO_{2} contradicts the Wiedemann–Franz law that holds that the ratio of the electronic contribution of the thermal conductivity (κ) to the electrical conductivity (σ) of a metal is proportional to the temperature. The thermal conductivity that could be attributed to electron movement was 10% of the amount predicted by the Wiedemann–Franz law. The reason for this appears to be the fluidic way that the electrons move through the material, reducing the typical random electron motion. Thermal conductivity ~ 0.2 W/m⋅K, electrical conductivity ~ 8.0 ×10^5 S/m.

Potential applications include converting waste heat from engines and appliances into electricity, and windows or window coverings that keep buildings cool. Thermal conductivity varied when VO_{2} was mixed with other materials. At a low temperature it could act as an insulator, while conducting heat at a higher temperature.

== Synthesis and structure ==
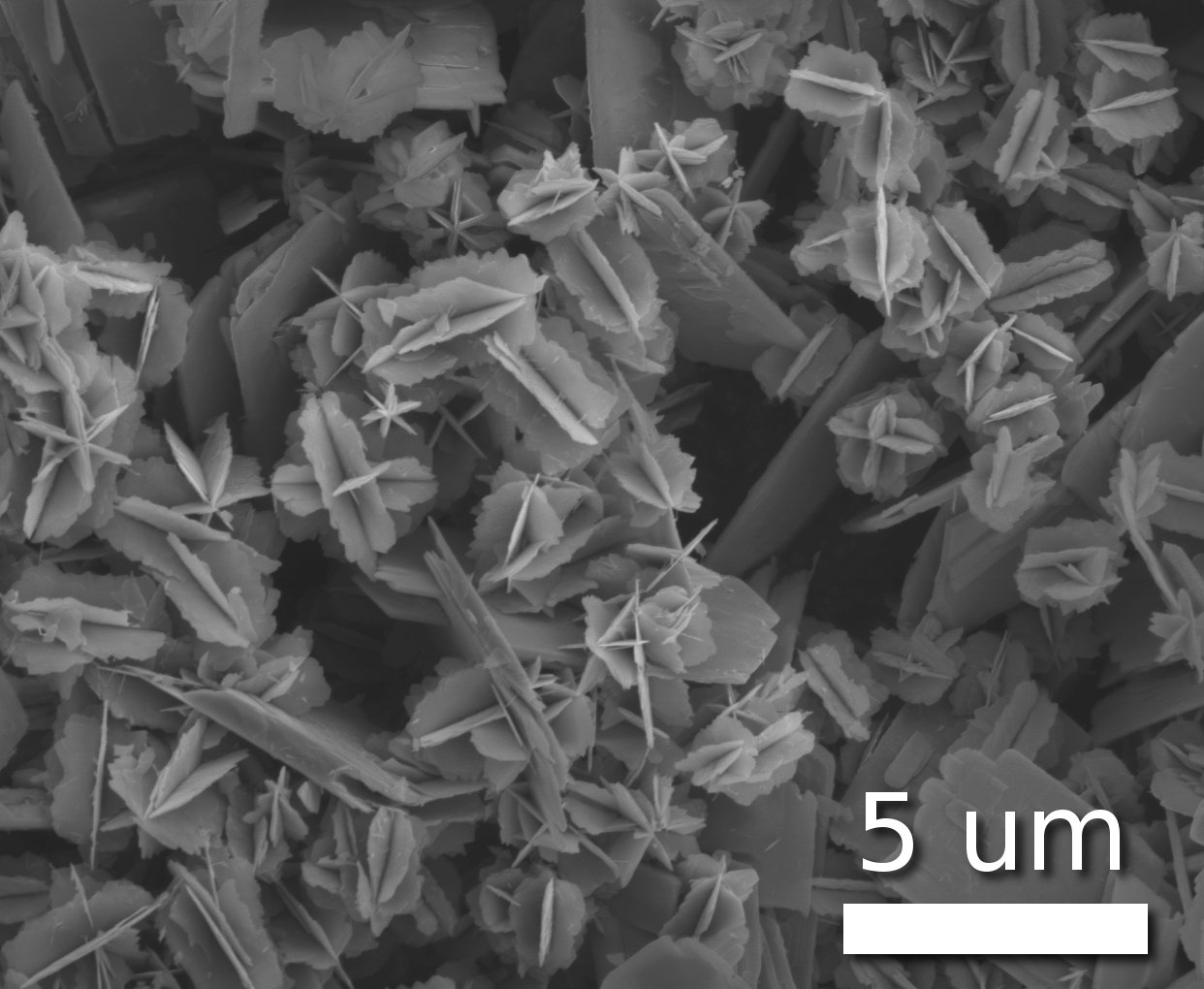
Nanostars of vanadium(IV) oxide.

Following the method described by Berzelius, VO_{2} is prepared by comproportionation of vanadium(III) oxide and vanadium(V) oxide:

V_{2}O_{5} + V_{2}O_{3} → 4 VO_{2}

At room temperature VO_{2} has a distorted rutile structure with shorter distances between pairs of V atoms indicating metal-metal bonding. Above 68 °C (341 K), the structure changes to an undistorted rutile structure and the metal-metal bonds are broken causing an increase in electrical conductivity and magnetic susceptibility as the bonding electrons are "released". The origin of this insulator to metal transition remains controversial and is of interest both for condensed matter physics and practical applications, such as electrical switches, tunable electrical filters, power limiters, nano-oscillators, memristors, field-effect transistors and metamaterials.

== Infrared reflectance ==
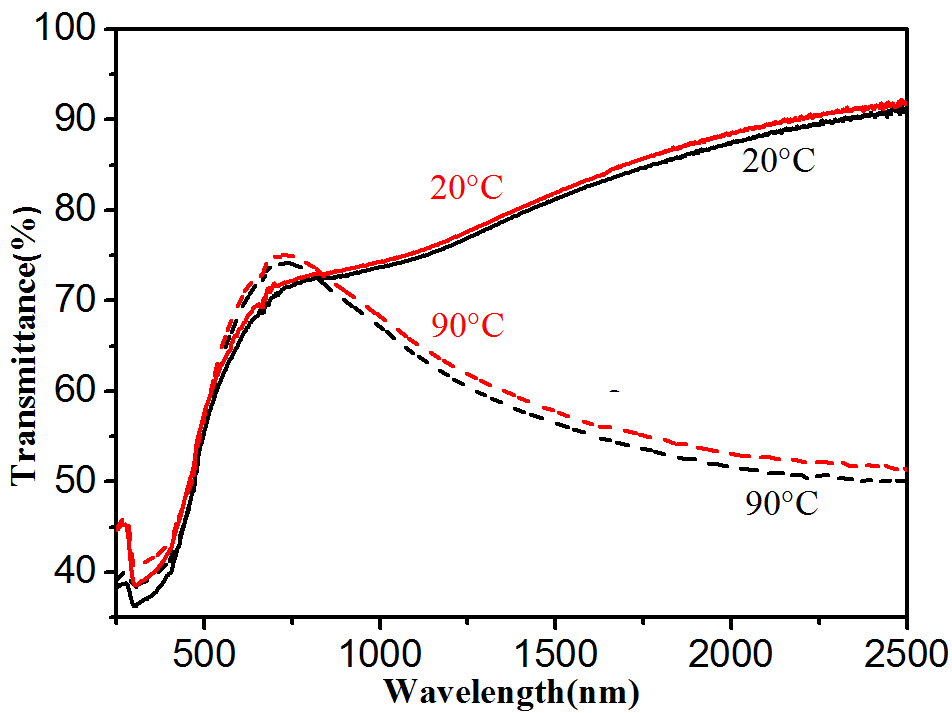
Transmittance spectra of a VO_{2}/SiO_{2} film. Mild heating results in significant absorption of infrared light.

VO_{2} expresses temperature-dependent reflective properties. When heated from room temperature to 80 °C (353 K), the material's thermal radiation rises normally until 74 °C (347 K), before suddenly appearing to drop to around 20 °C (293 K). At room temperature, VO_{2} is almost transparent to infrared light. As its temperature rises it gradually changes to reflective. At intermediate temperatures it behaves as a highly absorbing dielectric.

A thin film of vanadium oxide on a highly reflecting substrate (for specific infrared wavelengths) such as sapphire is either absorbing or reflecting, dependent on temperature. Its emissivity varies considerably with temperature. When the vanadium oxide transitions with increased temperature, the structure undergoes a sudden decrease in emissivity – looking colder to infrared cameras than it really is.

Varying the substrate materials (e.g., to indium tin oxide), as well as modifying the vanadium oxide coating using doping, straining, or other processes, alters the wavelengths and temperature ranges at which the thermal effects are observed.

Nanoscale structures that appear naturally in the materials' transition region can suppress thermal radiation as the temperature rises. Doping the coating with tungsten lowers the effect's thermal range to room temperature.

== Uses ==
=== Infrared radiation management ===
Undoped and tungsten-doped vanadium dioxide films can act as "spectrally-selective" coatings to block infrared transmission and reduce the loss of building interior heat through windows. Varying the amount of tungsten allows regulating the phase transition temperature at a rate of 20 °C (20 K) per 1 atomic percent of tungsten. The coating has a slight yellow-green color. The performance of energy-saving smart windows can be enhanced by combining VO2 with antireflection layers. The technology of low-temperature preparation of V_{1−x}W_{x}O_{2}-based multilayers has been scaled up to industrial dimensions.

Other potential applications of its thermal properties include passive camouflage, thermal beacons, communication, or to deliberately speed up or slow down cooling. These applications could be useful for a variety of structures from homes to satellites.

Vanadium dioxide can act as extremely fast optical modulators, infrared modulators for missile guidance systems, cameras, data storage, and other applications. The thermochromic phase transition between the transparent semiconductive and reflective conductive phase, occurring at 68 °C (341 K), can happen in times as short as 100 femtoseconds.

=== Passive radiative cooling ===
Vanadium dioxide is essential to achieving temperature-based 'switchable' cooling and heating effects for passive daytime radiative cooling surfaces without additional energy input. Temperature-based switching can be essential to mitigate potential "overcooling" effects of radiative cooling devices in urban environments, especially those with hot summers and cool winters, making it possible for radiative coolers to also function as passive heating devices when necessary.

=== Phase change computing and memory ===
The insulator-metal phase transition in VO_{2} can be manipulated at the nanoscale using a biased conducting atomic force microscope tip, suggesting applications in computing and information storage.

== See also ==
- Vanadium redox battery
