= Post-transition metal =

Category of metallic elements

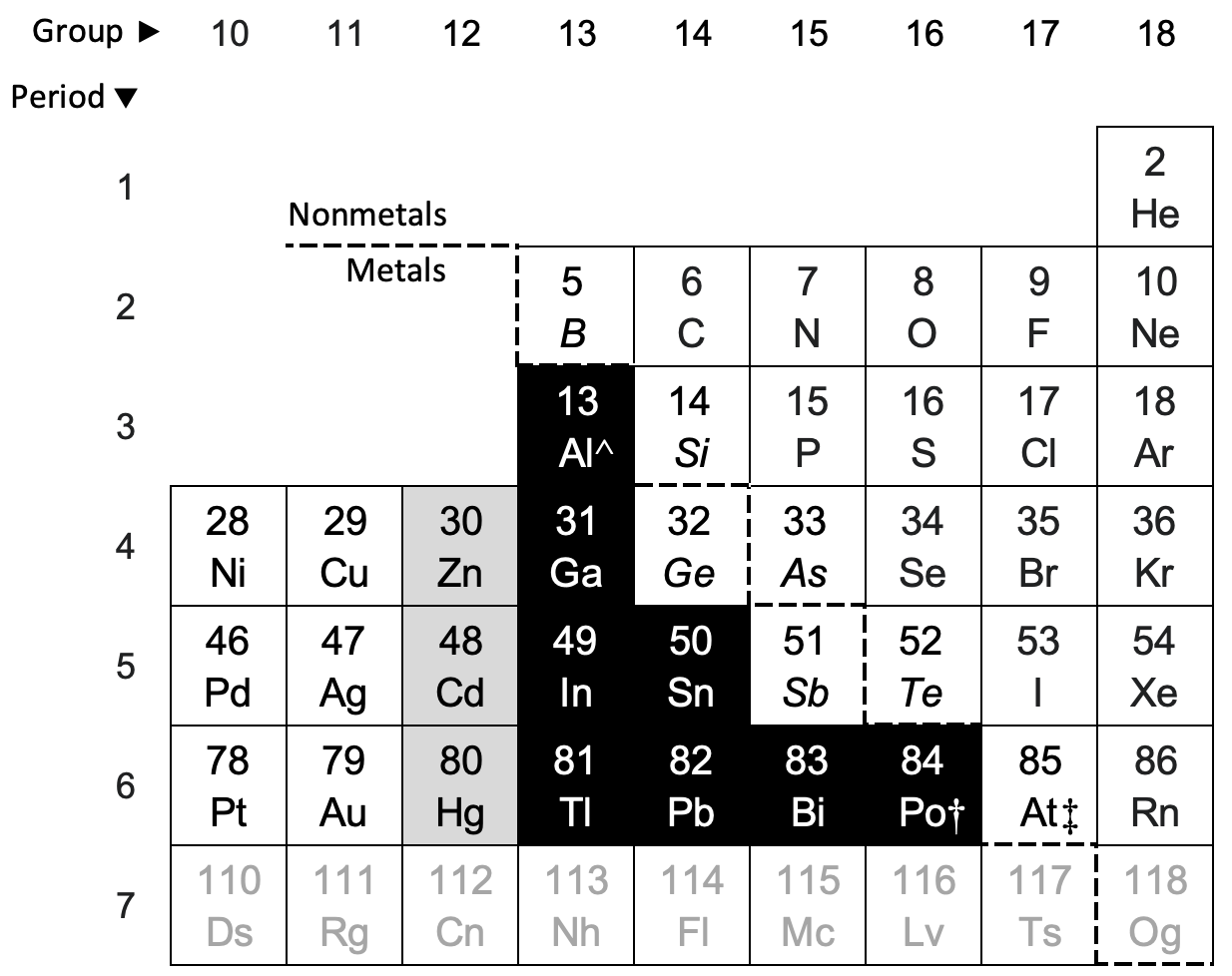
Periodic table extract showing the location of the post-transition metals. Zn, Cd and Hg are sometimes counted as post-transition metals rather than as transition metals. The dashed line is the traditional dividing line between metals and nonmetals. The symbols for the elements commonly recognized as metalloids are in italics. The status of elements 110 to 118 has not been confirmed, though elements 113–116 are sometimes considered post-transition metals.^ Aluminium is occasionally not counted as a post-transition metal given its absence of d electrons † Polonium is sometimes instead counted as a metalloid ‡ Astatine is widely regarded as either a nonmetal or less often as a metalloid but has been predicted to be a metal

The metallic elements in the periodic table located between the transition metals to their left and the chemically weak nonmetallic metalloids to their right have received many names in the literature, such as post-transition metals, poor metals, other metals, p-block metals, basic metals, and chemically weak metals.

Physically, these metals are soft (or brittle), have poor mechanical strength, and usually have melting points lower than those of the transition metals. Being close to the metal-nonmetal border, their crystalline structures tend to show covalent or directional bonding effects, having generally greater complexity or fewer nearest neighbours than other metallic elements.

Chemically, they are characterised—to varying degrees—by covalent bonding tendencies, acid-base amphoterism and the formation of anionic species such as aluminates, stannates, and bismuthates (in the case of aluminium, tin, and bismuth, respectively). They can also form Zintl phases (half-metallic compounds formed between highly electropositive metals and moderately electronegative metals or metalloids).

== Applicable elements ==
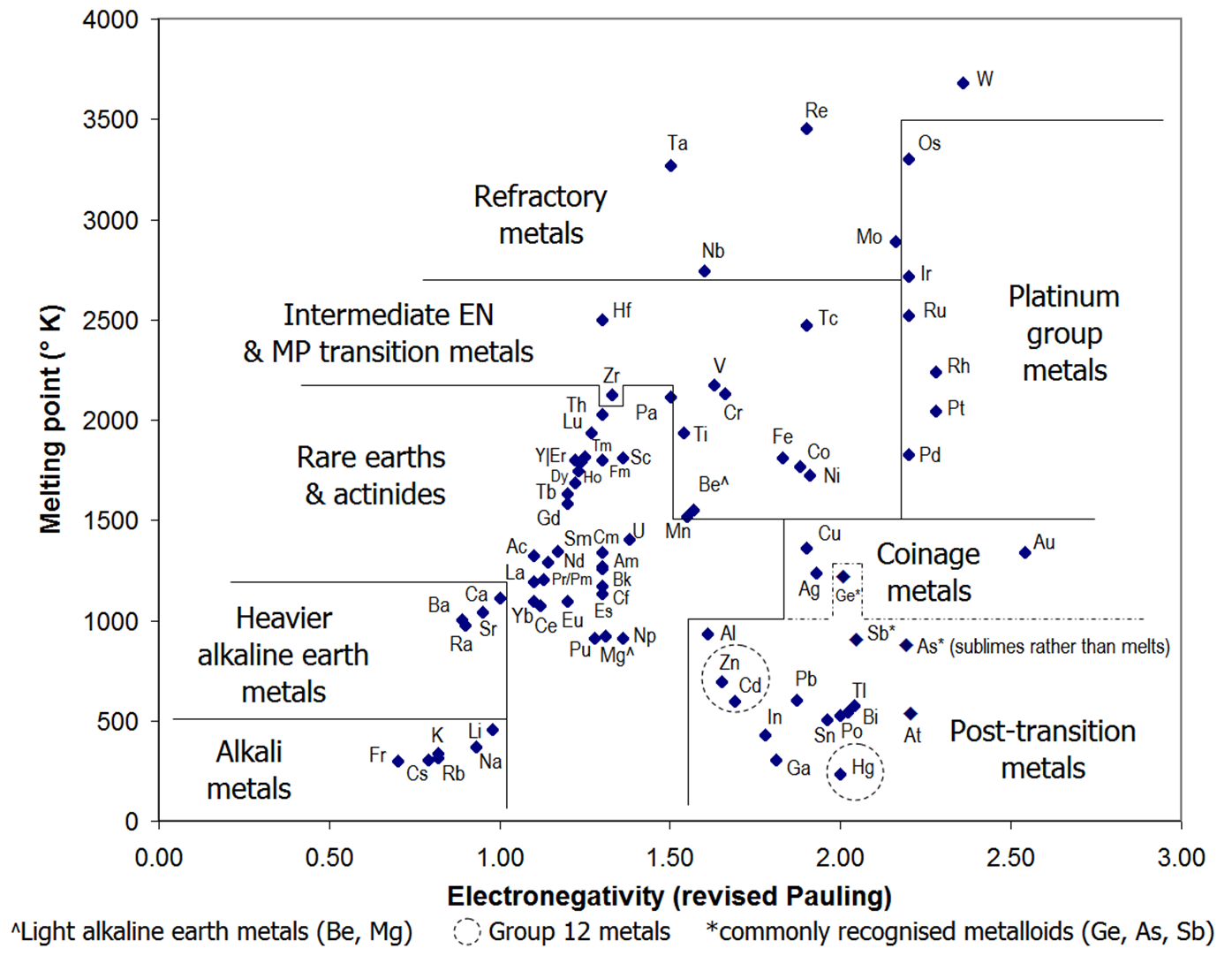
Scatter plot of electronegativity values and melting points for metals (up to fermium, element 100) and some borderline elements (Ge, As, Sb, At). Elements categorised by some authors as post-transition metals are distinguished by their relatively high electronegativity values, and relatively low melting points (Pt is anomalous in this regard). High electronegativity corresponds to increasing nonmetallic character; low melting temperature corresponds to weaker cohesive forces between atoms and reduced mechanical strength. The geography of the plot broadly matches that of the periodic table. Starting from the bottom left, and proceeding clockwise, the alkali metals are followed by the heavier alkaline earth metals; the rare earths and actinides (Sc, Y and the lanthanides being here treated as rare earths); transition metals with intermediate electronegativity values and melting points; the refractory metals; the platinum group metals; and the coinage metals (the latter three categories are sub-categories of the broader category of transition metals occupying groups 3–12 of the periodic table). The increased electronegativity of Be and Mg and the higher melting point of Be distances these light alkaline earth metals from their heavier congeners. This separation extends to other differences in physical and chemical behaviour between the light and heavier alkaline earth metals. (Note: Physical properties: "The lighter alkaline earths possess fairly high electrical and thermal conductivities and sufficient strength for structural use. The heavier elements are poor conductors and are too weak and reactive for structural use." Chemical: The lighter alkaline earths show covalent bonding tendencies (Be predominantly; Mg considerably) whereas compounds of the heavier alkaline earths are predominantly ionic in nature; the heavier alkaline earths have more stable hydrides and less stable carbides.)

The post-transition metals are located on the periodic table between the transition metals to their left and the chemically weak nonmetallic metalloids or nonmetals to their right. Generally included in this category are: the group 13–16 metals in periods 4–6 namely gallium, indium and thallium, tin and lead, bismuth, and polonium; and aluminium, a group 13 metal in period 3.

They can be seen at the bottom right in the accompanying plot of electronegativity values and melting points.

The boundaries of the category are not necessarily sharp as there is some overlapping of properties with adjacent categories (as occurs with classification schemes generally).

Some elements otherwise counted as transition metals are sometimes instead counted as post-transition metals namely the group 10 metal platinum; the group 11 coinage metals copper, silver and gold; and, more often, the group 12 metals zinc, cadmium and mercury. (Note: Which elements start to be counted as post-transition metals depends, in periodic table terms, on where the transition metals are taken to end. In the 1950s, most inorganic chemistry textbooks defined transition elements as finishing at group 10 (nickel, palladium and platinum), therefore excluding group 11 (copper, silver and gold), and group 12 (zinc, cadmium and mercury). A survey of chemistry books in 2003 showed that the transition metals ended at either group 11 or group 12 with roughly equal frequency. A first IUPAC definition states "[T]he elements of groups 3–12 are the d-block elements. These elements are also commonly referred to as the transition elements, though the elements of group 12 are not always included". Depending on the inclusion of group 12 as transition metals, the post-transition metals therefore may or may not include the group 12 elements—zinc, cadmium, and mercury. A second IUPAC definition for transition metals states "An element whose atom has an incomplete d sub-shell, or which can give rise to cations with an incomplete d sub-shell." Based on this definition one could argue group 12 should be split with mercury and probably also copernicium as transition metals, and zinc and cadmium as post-transition metals. Of relevance is the synthesis of mercury(IV) fluoride, which seemingly establishes mercury as a transition metal. This conclusion has been challenged by Jensen with the argument that HgF_{4} only exists under highly atypical non-equilibrium conditions (at 4 K) and should best be considered as an exception. Copernicium has been predicted to have (a) an electron configuration similar to that of mercury; and (b) a predominance of its chemistry in the +4 state, and on that basis would be regarded as a transition metal. However, in recent years, doubt has been cast on the synthesis of HgF_{4}.)

Similarly, some elements otherwise counted as metalloids or nonmetals are sometimes instead counted as post-transition metals namely germanium, arsenic, selenium, antimony, tellurium, and polonium (of which germanium, arsenic, antimony, and tellurium are usually considered to be metalloids). Astatine, which is usually classified as a nonmetal or a metalloid, has been predicted to have a metallic crystalline structure. If so, it would be a post-transition metal.

Elements 112–118 (copernicium through oganesson) may be post-transition metals; insufficient quantities of them have been synthesized to allow sufficient investigation of their actual physical and chemical properties.

== Rationale ==
The diminished metallic nature of the post-transition metals is largely attributable to the increase in nuclear charge going across the periodic table, from left to right. The increase in nuclear charge is partially offset by an increasing number of electrons but as these are spatially distributed each extra electron does not fully screen each successive increase in nuclear charge, and the latter therefore dominates. With some irregularities, atomic radii contract, ionisation energies increase, fewer electrons become available for metallic bonding, and "ions [become] smaller and more polarizing and more prone to covalency." This phenomenon is more evident in period 4–6 post-transition metals, due to inefficient screening of their nuclear charges by their d^{10} and (in the case of the period 6 metals) f^{14} electron configurations; the screening power of electrons decreases in the sequence s > p > d > f. The reductions in atomic size due to the interjection of the d- and f-blocks are referred to as, respectively, the 'scandide' or 'd-block contraction', (Note: The scandide contraction refers to the first row transition metals; the d-block contraction is a more general term.) and the 'lanthanide contraction'. Relativistic effects also "increase the binding energy", and hence ionisation energy, of the electrons in "the 6s shell in gold and mercury, and the 6p shell in subsequent elements of period 6."

== Descriptive chemistry ==
=== Group 10 ===
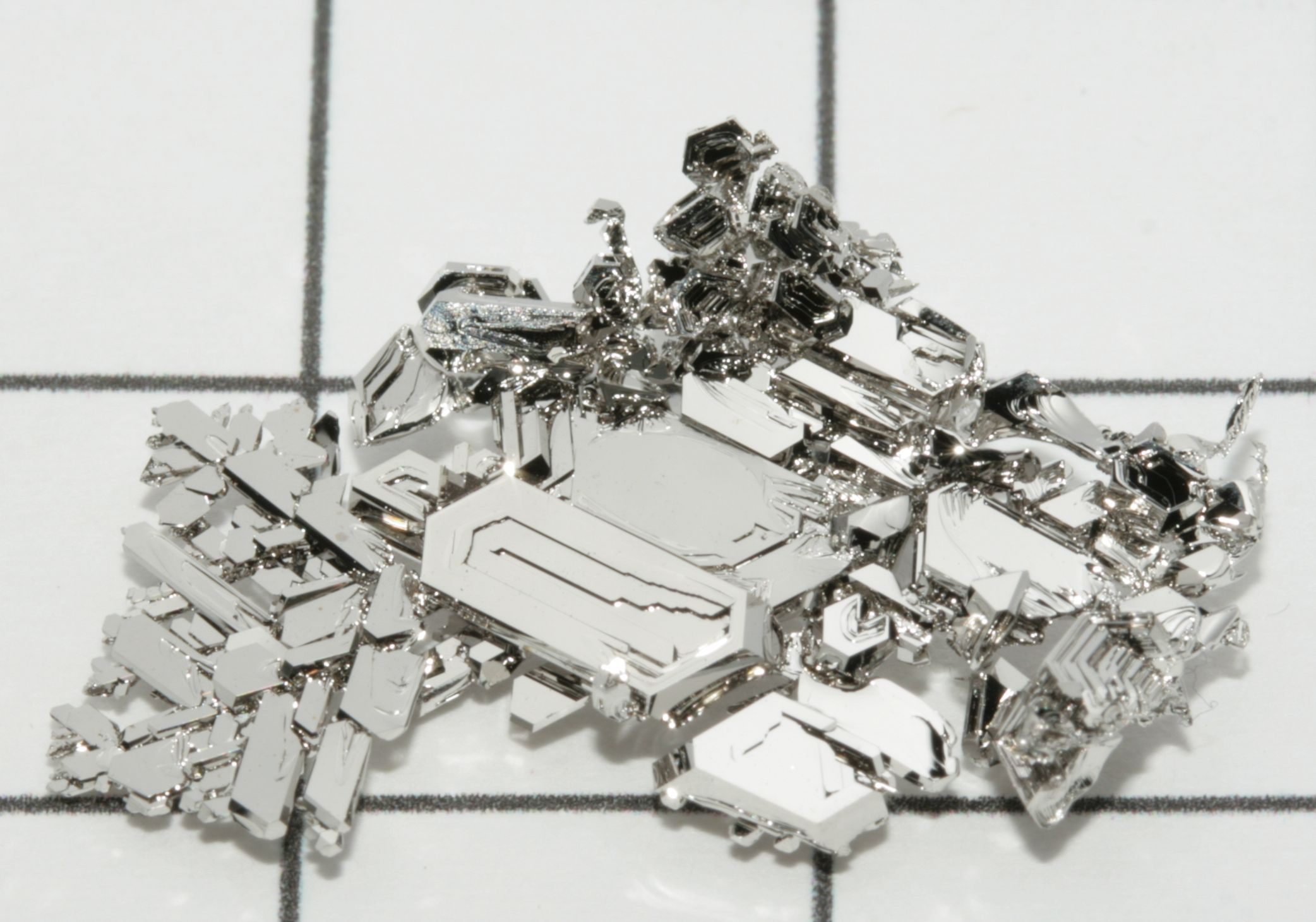
Platinum crystals

Platinum is a moderately hard metal (MH 3.5) of low mechanical strength, with a close-packed face-centred cubic structure (BCN 12). Compared to other metals in this category, it has an unusually high melting point (2042 K v 1338 for gold). Platinum is more ductile than gold, silver or copper, thus being the most ductile of pure metals, but it is less malleable than gold. Like gold, platinum is a chalcophile element in terms of its occurrence in the Earth's crust, preferring to form covalent bonds with sulfur. It behaves like a transition metal in its preferred oxidation states of +2 and +4. There is very little evidence of the existence of simple metal ions in aqueous media; most platinum compounds are (covalent) coordination complexes. The oxide (PtO_{2}) is amphoteric, with acidic properties predominating; it can be fused with alkali hydroxides (MOH; M = Na, K) or calcium oxide (CaO) to give anionic platinates, such as red Na_{2}PtO_{3} and green K_{2}PtO_{3}. The hydrated oxide can be dissolved in hydrochloric acid to give the hexachlormetallate(IV), H_{2}PtCl_{6}.

Like gold, which can form compounds containing the −1 auride ion, platinum can form compounds containing platinide ions, such as the Zintl phases BaPt, Ba_{3}Pt_{2} and Ba_{2}Pt, being the first (unambiguous) transition metal to do so.

Darmstadtium should be similar to its lighter homologue platinum. It is expected to have a close-packed body-centered cubic structure. It should be a very dense metal, with a density of 26–27 g/cm^{3} surpassing all stable elements. Darmstadtium chemistry is expected to be dominated by the +2 and +4 oxidation states, similar to platinum. Darmstadtium(IV) oxide (DsO_{2}) should be amphoteric, and darmstadtium(II) oxide (DsO) basic, exactly analogous to platinum. There should also be a +6 oxidation state, similar to platinum. Darmstadtium should be a very noble metal: the standard reduction potential for the Ds^{2+}/Ds couple is expected to be +1.7 V, more than the +1.52 V for the Au^{3+}/Au couple.

=== Group 11 ===
The group 11 metals are typically categorised as transition metals given they can form ions with incomplete d-shells. Physically, they have the relatively low melting points and high electronegativity values associated with post-transition metals. "The filled d subshell and free s electron of Cu, Ag, and Au contribute to their high electrical and thermal conductivity. Transition metals to the left of group 11 experience interactions between s electrons and the partially filled d subshell that lower electron mobility." Chemically, the group 11 metals in their +1 valence states show similarities to other post-transition metals; they are occasionally classified as such.

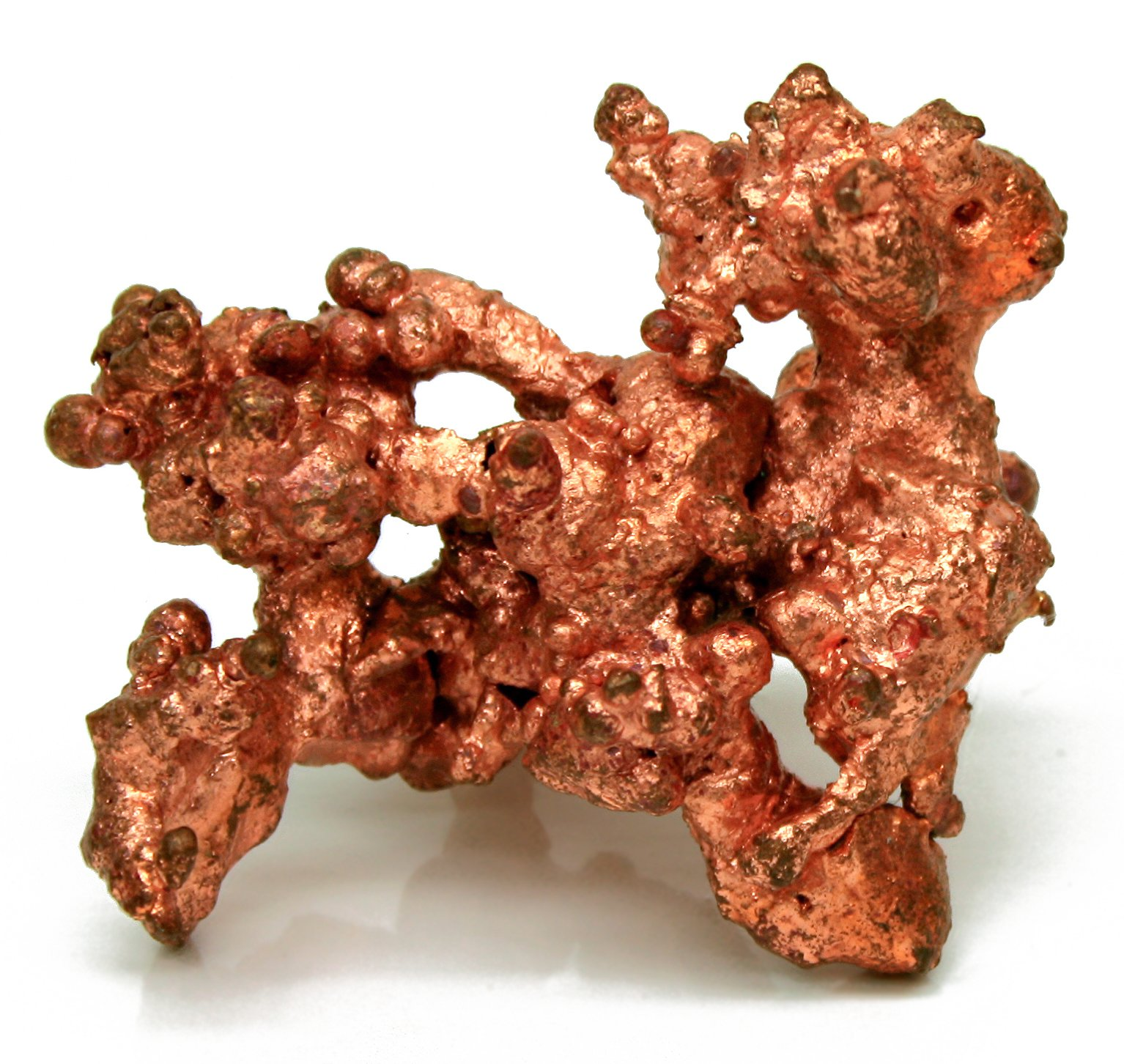
Copper

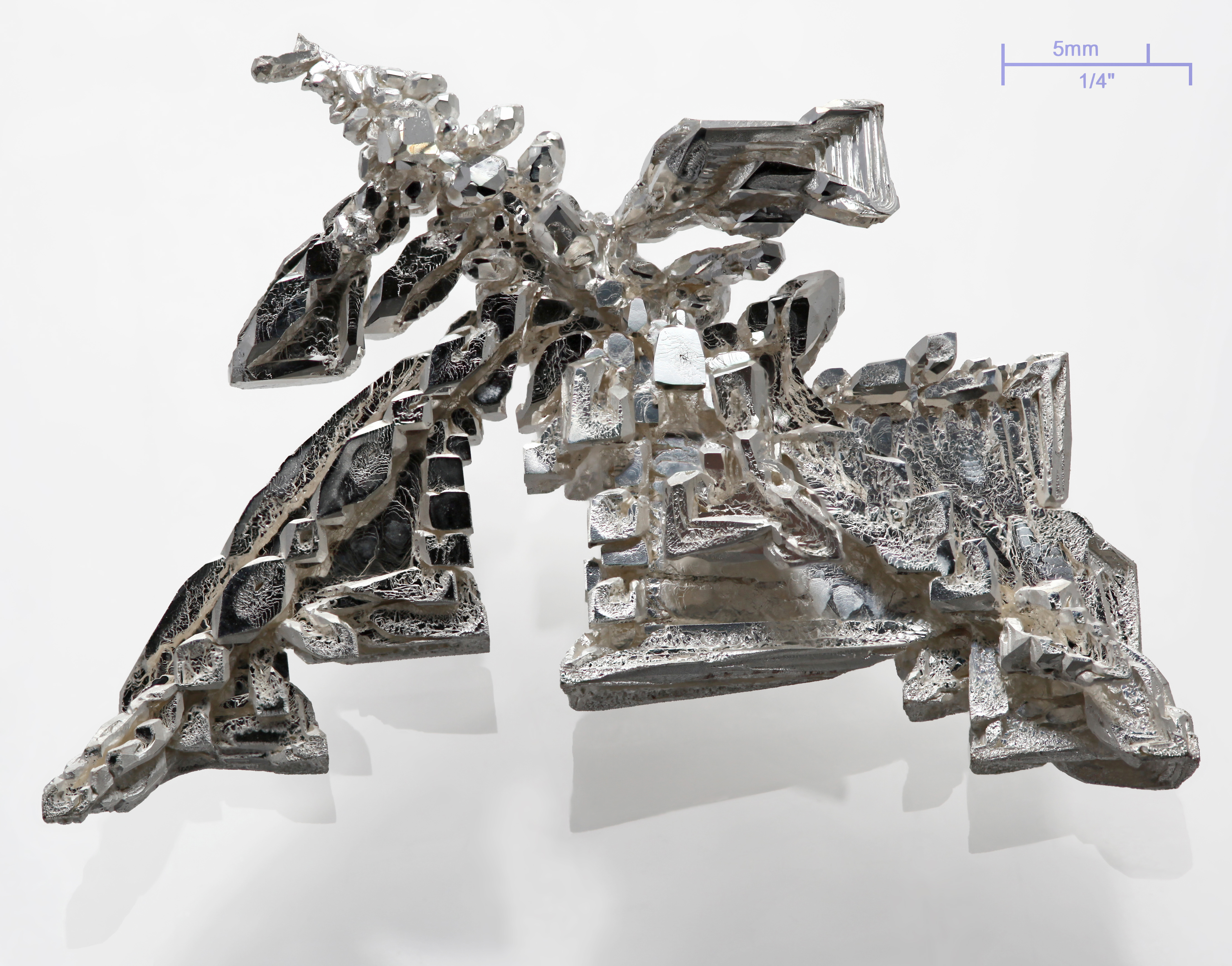
Silver

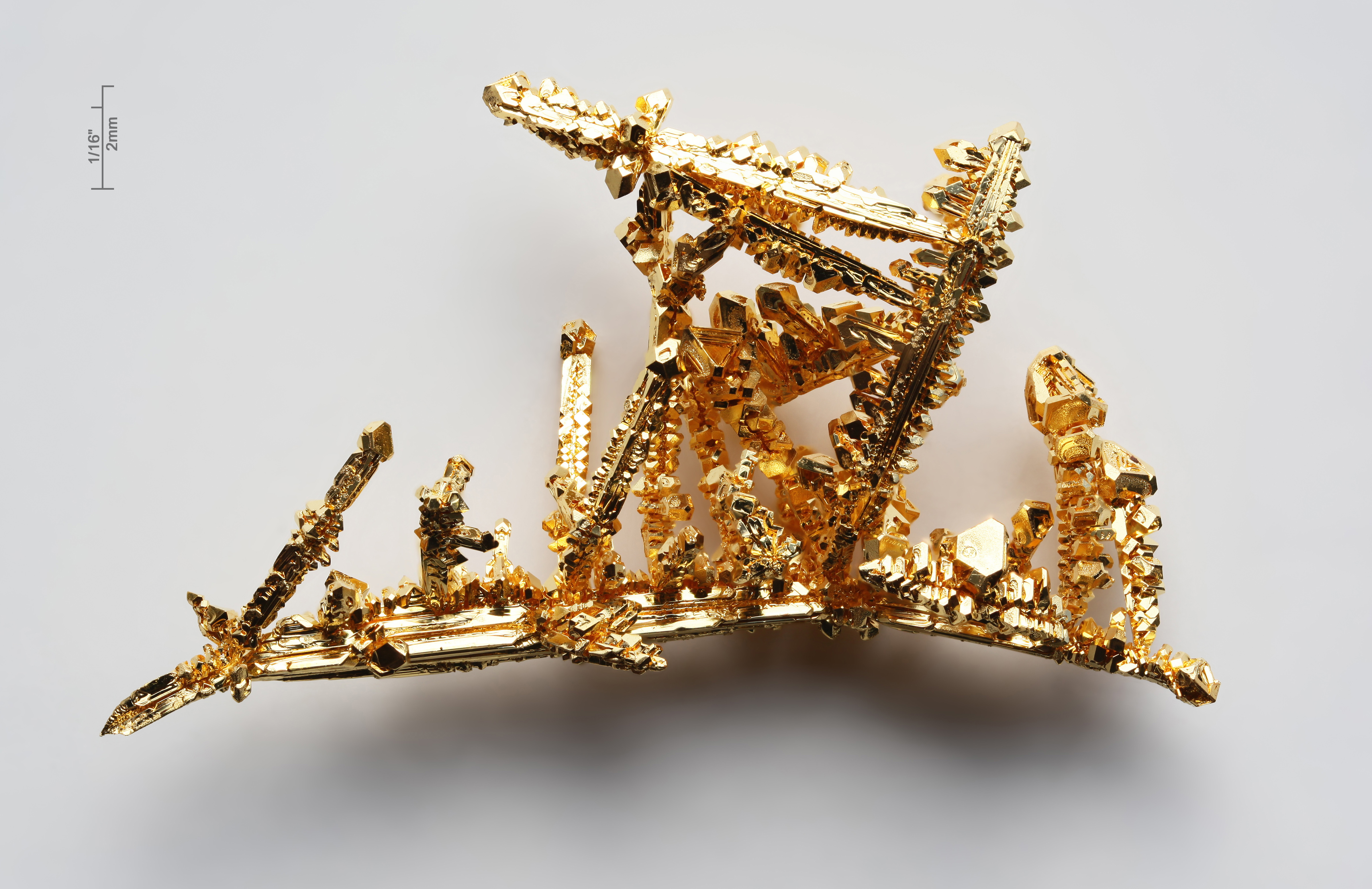
Gold

Copper is a soft metal (MH 2.5–3.0) with low mechanical strength. It has a close-packed face-centred cubic structure (BCN 12). Copper behaves like a transition metal in its preferred oxidation state of +2. Stable compounds in which copper is in its less preferred oxidation state of +1 (Cu_{2}O, CuCl, CuBr, CuI and CuCN, for example) have significant covalent character. The oxide (CuO) is amphoteric, with predominating basic properties; it can be fused with alkali oxides (M_{2}O; M = Na, K) to give anionic oxycuprates (M_{2}CuO_{2}). Copper forms Zintl phases such as Li_{7}CuSi_{2} and M_{3}Cu_{3}Sb_{4} (M = Y, La, Ce, Pr, Nd, Sm, Gd, Tb, Dy, Ho, or Er).

Silver is a soft metal (MH 2.5–3) with low mechanical strength. It has a close-packed face-centred cubic structure (BCN 12). The chemistry of silver is dominated by its +1 valence state in which it shows generally similar physical and chemical properties to compounds of thallium, a main group metal, in the same oxidation state. It tends to bond covalently in most of its compounds. The oxide (Ag_{2}O) is amphoteric, with basic properties predominating. Silver forms a series of oxoargentates (M_{3}AgO_{2}, M = Na, K, Rb). It is a constituent of Zintl phases such as Li_{2}AgM (M = Al, Ga, In, Tl, Si, Ge, Sn or Pb) and Yb_{3}Ag_{2}.

Gold is a soft metal (MH 2.5–3) that is easily deformed. It has a close-packed face-centred cubic structure (BCN 12). The chemistry of gold is dominated by its +3 valence state; all such compounds of gold feature covalent bonding, as do its stable +1 compounds. Gold oxide (Au_{2}O_{3}) is amphoteric, with acidic properties predominating; it forms anionic hydroxoaurates M[Au(OH)_{4}], where M = Na, K, ½Ba, Tl; and aurates such as NaAuO_{2}. Gold is a constituent of Zintl phases such as M_{2}AuBi (M = Li or Na); Li_{2}AuM (M = In, Tl, Ge, Pb, Sn) and Ca_{5}Au_{4}.

Roentgenium is expected to be similar to its lighter homologue gold in many ways. It is expected to have a close-packed body-centered cubic structure. It should be a very dense metal, with its density of 22–24 g/cm^{3} being around that of osmium and iridium, the densest stable elements. Roentgenium chemistry is expected to be dominated by the +3 valence state, similarly to gold, in which it should similarly behave as a transition metal. Roentgenium oxide (Rg_{2}O_{3}) should be amphoteric; stable compounds in the −1, +1, and +5 valence states should also exist, exactly analogous to gold. Roentgenium is similarly expected to be a very noble metal: the standard reduction potential for the Rg^{3+}/Rg couple is expected to be +1.9 V, more than the +1.52 V for the Au^{3+}/Au couple. The [Rg(H_{2}O)_{2}]^{+} cation is expected to be the softest among the metal cations. Due to relativistic stabilisation of the 7s subshell, roentgenium is expected to have a full s-subshell and a partially filled d-subshell, instead of the free s-electron and full d-subshell of copper, silver, and gold.

=== Group 12 ===
On the group 12 metals (zinc, cadmium and mercury), Smith observed that, "Textbook writers have always found difficulty in dealing with these elements." There is an abrupt and significant reduction in physical metallic character from group 11 to group 12. Their chemistry is that of main group elements. A 2003 survey of chemistry books showed that they were treated as either transition metals or main group elements on about a 50/50 basis. (Note: The group 12 metals have been treated as transition metals for reasons of historical precedent, to compare and contrast properties, to preserve symmetry, or for basic teaching purposes.) The IUPAC Red Book notes that although the group 3−12 elements are commonly referred to as the transition elements, the group 12 elements are not always included. The group 12 elements do not satisfy the IUPAC Gold Book definition of a transition metal. (Note: The IUPAC Gold Book defines a transition metal as 'An element whose atom has an incomplete d sub-shell, or which can give rise to cations with an incomplete d sub-shell.)

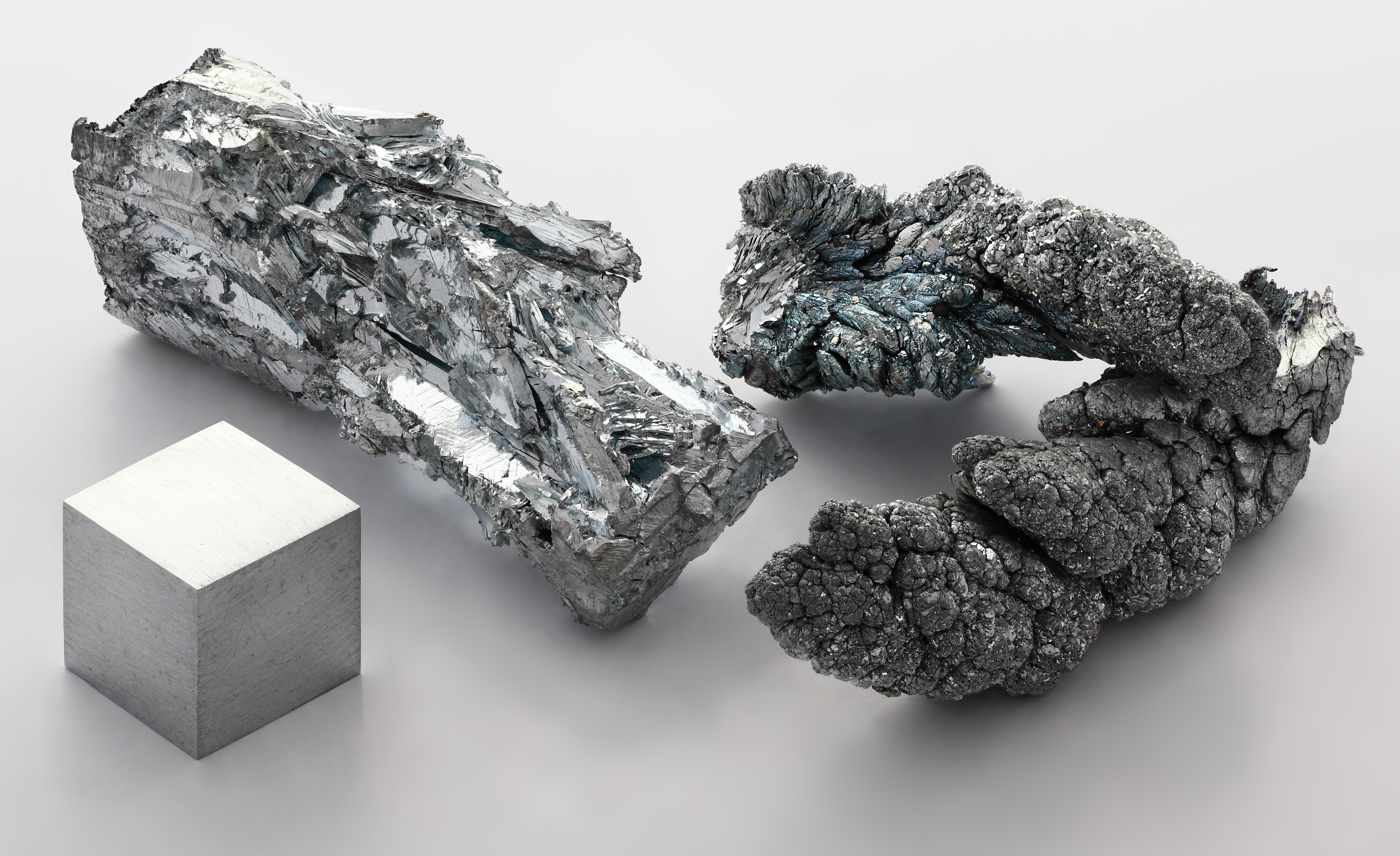
Zinc

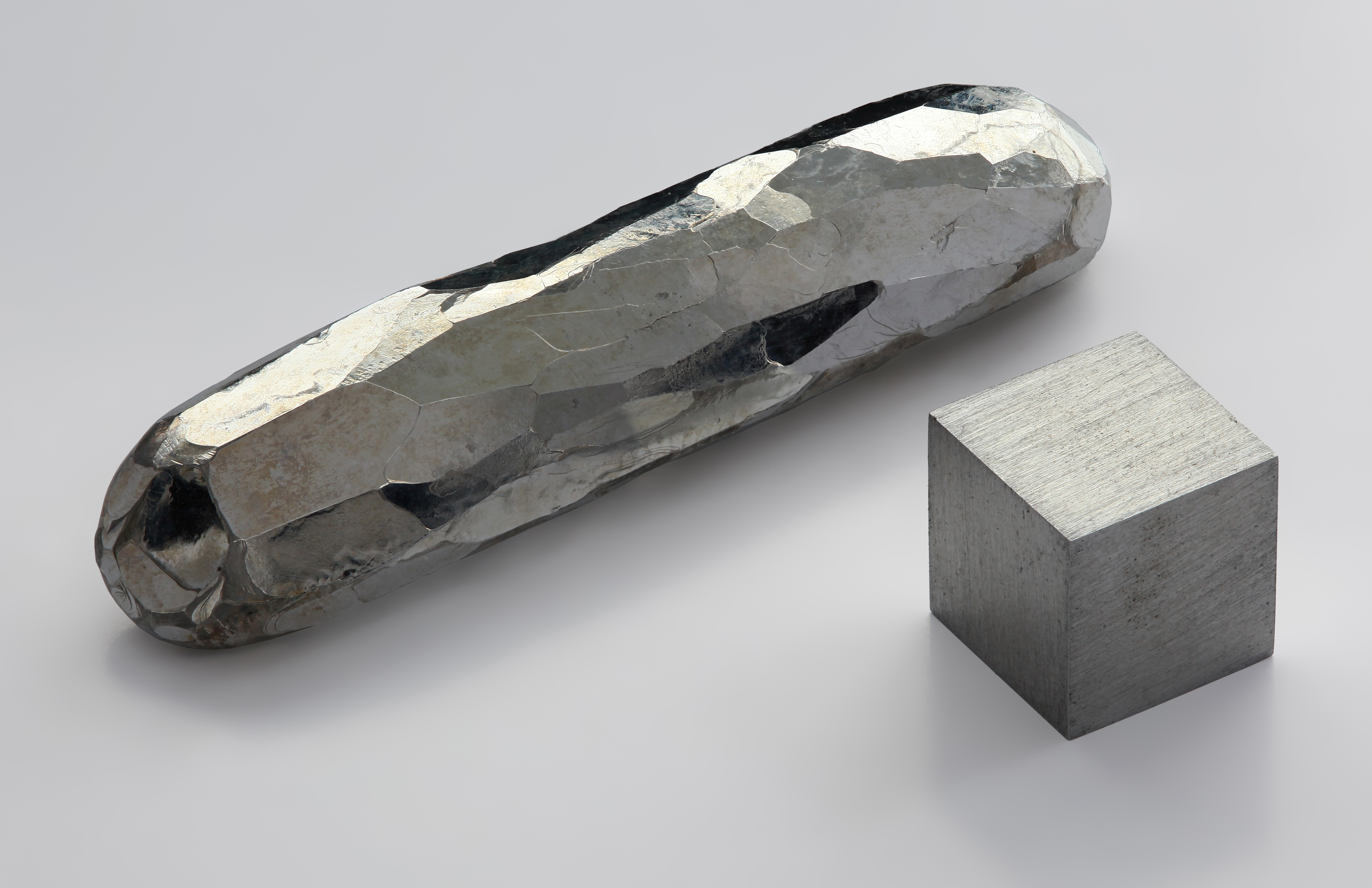
Cadmium

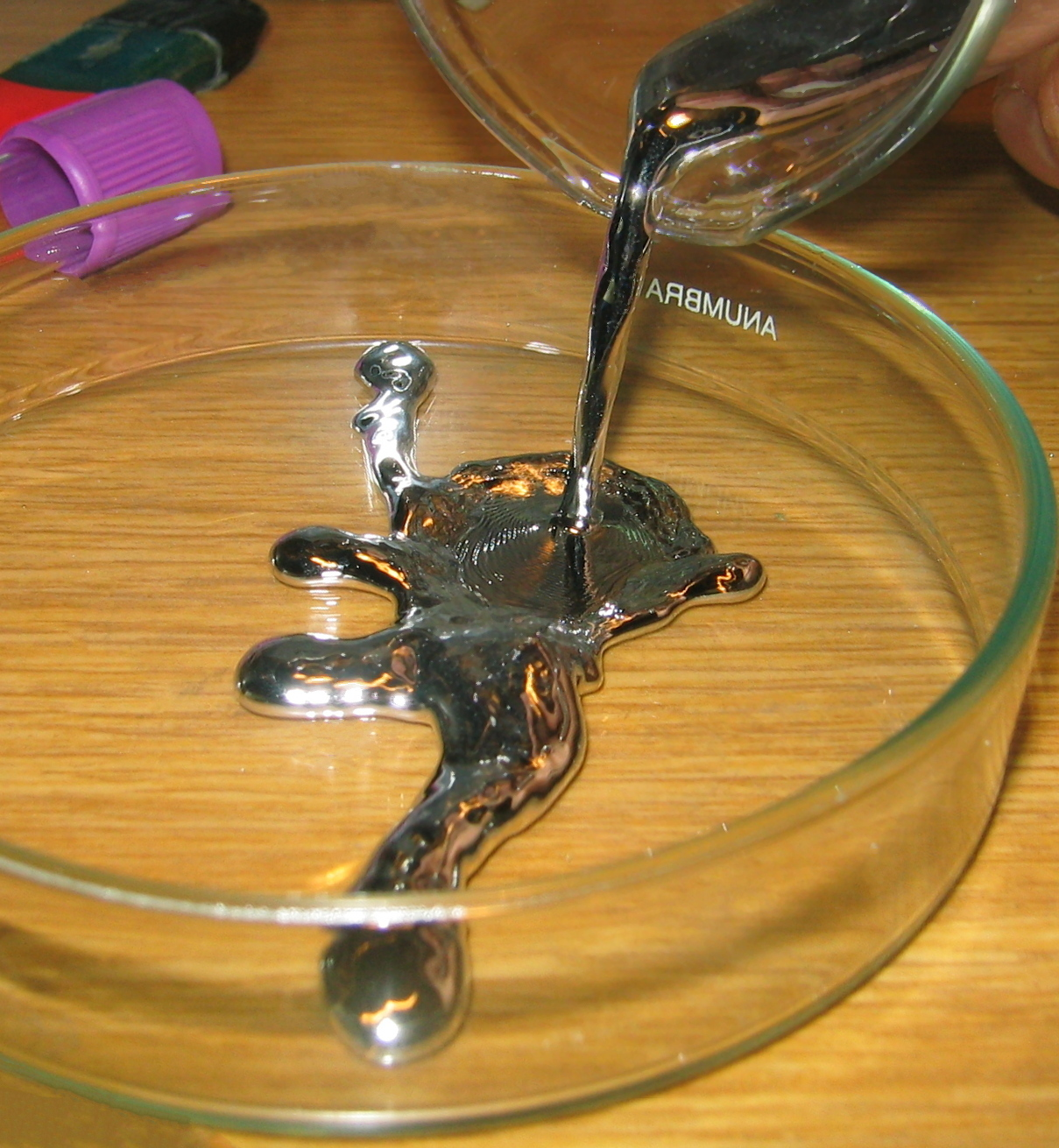
Mercury

Zinc is a soft metal (MH 2.5) with poor mechanical properties. It has a crystalline structure (BCN 6+6) that is slightly distorted from the ideal. Many zinc compounds are markedly covalent in character. The oxide and hydroxide of zinc in its preferred oxidation state of +2, namely ZnO and Zn(OH)_{2}, are amphoteric; it forms anionic zincates in strongly basic solutions. Zinc forms Zintl phases such as LiZn, NaZn_{13} and BaZn_{13}. Highly purified zinc, at room temperature, is ductile. It reacts with moist air to form a thin layer of carbonate that prevents further corrosion.

Cadmium is a soft, ductile metal (MH 2.0) that undergoes substantial deformation, under load, at room temperature. Like zinc, it has a crystalline structure (BCN 6+6) that is slightly distorted from the ideal. The halides of cadmium, with the exception of the fluoride, exhibit a substantially covalent nature. The oxides of cadmium in its preferred oxidation state of +2, namely CdO and Cd(OH)_{2}, are weakly amphoteric; it forms cadmates in strongly basic solutions. Cadmium forms Zintl phases such as LiCd, RbCd_{13} and CsCd_{13}. When heated in air to a few hundred degrees, cadmium represents a toxicity hazard due to the release of cadmium vapour; when heated to its boiling point in air (just above 1000 K; 725 C; 1340 F; cf steel ~2700 K; 2425 C; 4400 F), the cadmium vapour oxidizes, 'with a reddish-yellow flame, dispersing as an aerosol of potentially lethal CdO particles.' Cadmium is otherwise stable in air and in water, at ambient conditions, protected by a layer of cadmium oxide.

Mercury is a liquid at room temperature. It has the weakest metallic bonding of all, as indicated by its bonding energy (61 kJ/mol) and melting point (−39 °C) which, together, are the lowest of all the metallic elements. (Note: Francium may have a comparably low bonding energy but its melting point of around 8°C is significantly higher than that of mercury, at −39°C.) Solid mercury (MH 1.5) has a distorted crystalline structure, with mixed metallic-covalent bonding, and a BCN of 6. "All of the [Group 12] metals, but especially mercury, tend to form covalent rather than ionic compounds." The oxide of mercury in its preferred oxidation state (HgO; +2) is weakly amphoteric, as is the congener sulfide HgS. It forms anionic thiomercurates (such as Na_{2}HgS_{2} and BaHgS_{3}) in strongly basic solutions. (Note: Mercury also forms partially anionic oxomercurates, such as Li_{2}HgO_{2} and CdHgO_{4}, by heating mixtures of HgO with the relevant cation oxides, including under oxygen pressure (Müller-Buschbaum 1995; Deiseroth 2004, pp. 173, 177, 185–186).) It forms or is a part of Zintl phases such as NaHg and K_{8}In_{10}Hg. Mercury is a relatively inert metal, showing little oxide formation at room temperature.

Copernicium is expected to be a liquid at room temperature, although experiments have so far not succeeded in determining its boiling point with sufficient precision to prove this. Like its lighter congener mercury, many of its singular properties stem from its closed-shell d^{10}s^{2} electron configuration as well as strong relativistic effects. Its cohesive energy is even less than that of mercury and is likely only higher than that of flerovium. Solid copernicium is expected to crystallise in a close-packed body-centred cubic structure and have a density of about 14.7 g/cm^{3}, decreasing to 14.0 g/cm^{3} on melting, which is similar to that of mercury (13.534 g/cm^{3}). Copernicium chemistry is expected to be dominated by the +2 oxidation state, in which it would behave like a post-transition metal similar to mercury, although the relativistic stabilisation of the 7s orbitals means that this oxidation state involves giving up 6d rather than 7s electrons. A concurrent relativistic destabilisation of the 6d orbitals should allow higher oxidation states such as +3 and +4 with electronegative ligands, such as the halogens. A very high standard reduction potential of +2.1 V is expected for the Cn^{2+}/Cn couple. In fact, bulk copernicium may even be an insulator with a band gap of 6.4±0.2 V, which would make it similar to the noble gases such as radon, though copernicium has previously been predicted to be a semiconductor or a noble metal instead. Copernicium oxide (CnO) is expected to be predominantly basic.

=== Group 13 ===
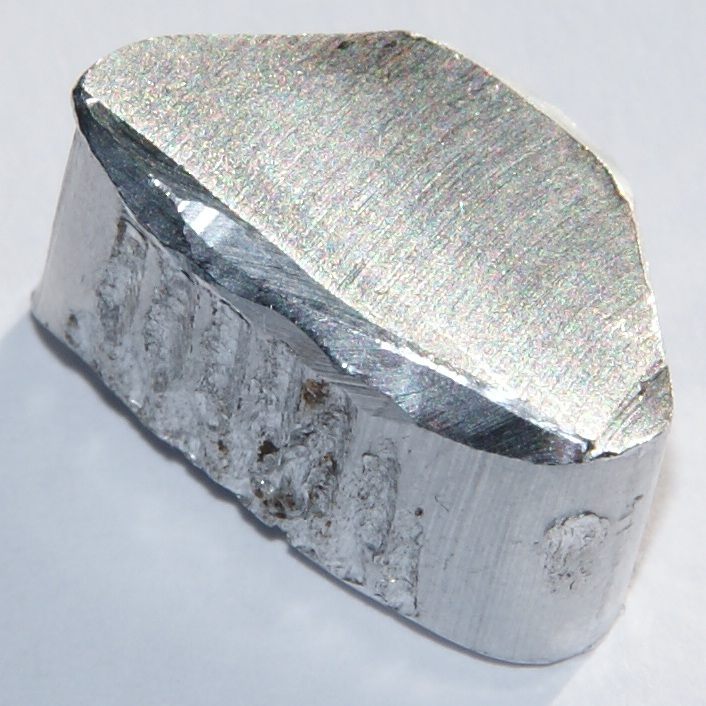
Aluminium

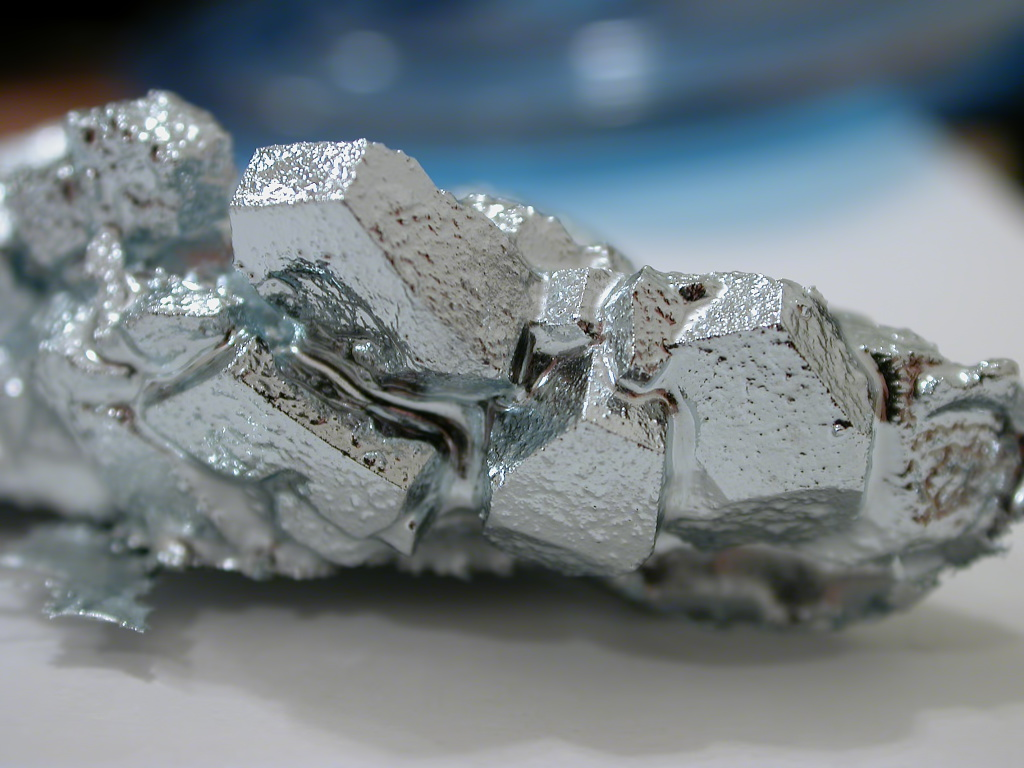
Gallium

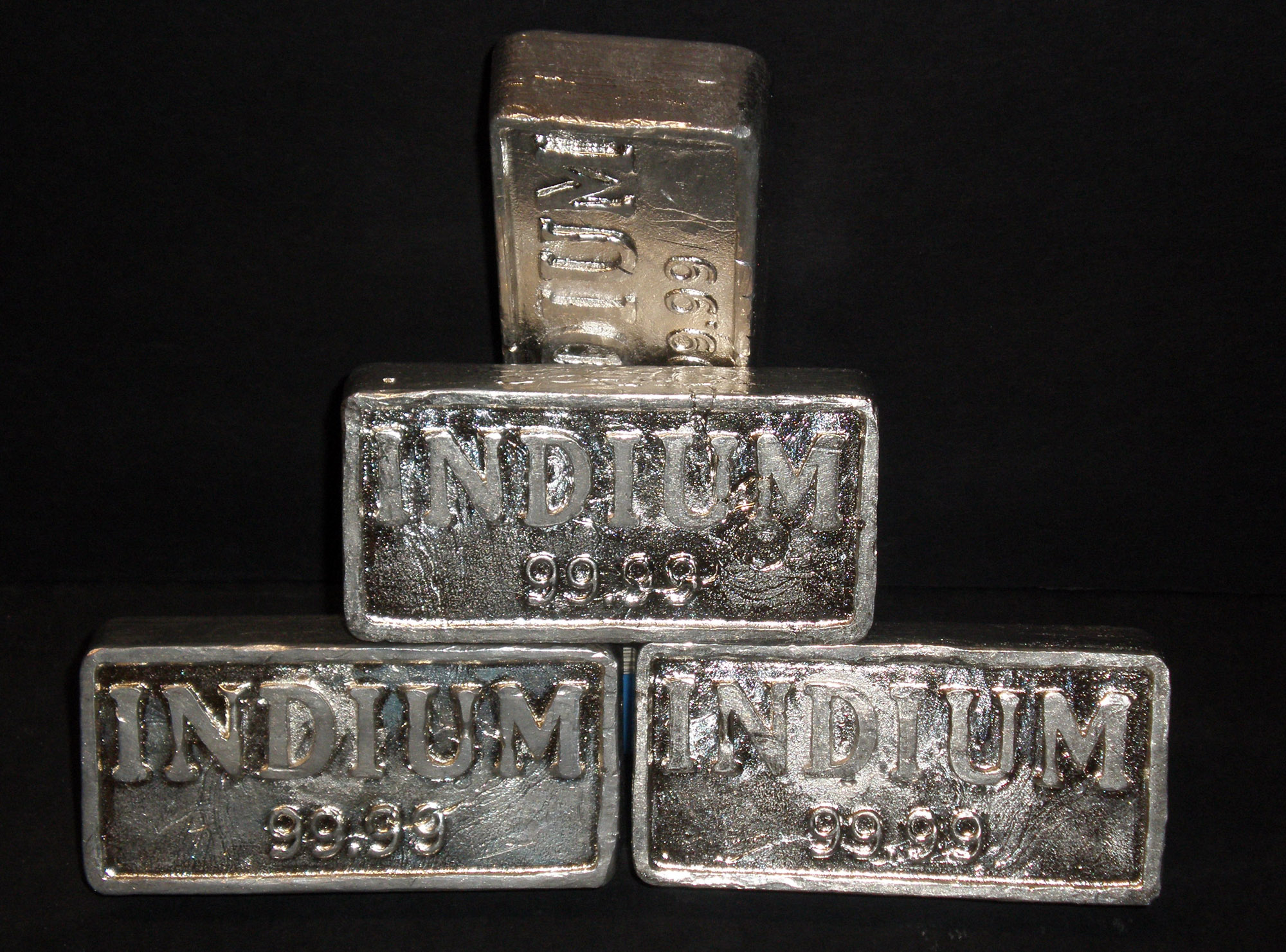
Indium

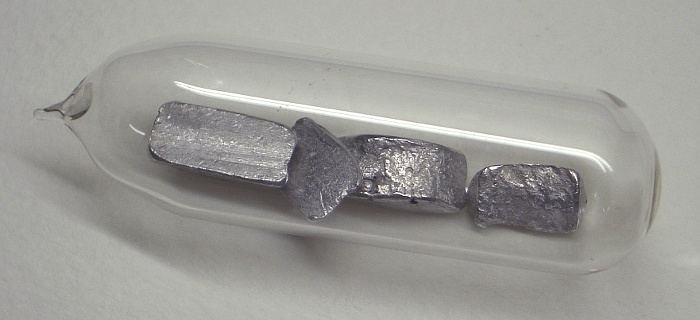
Thallium

Aluminium sometimes is or is not counted as a post-transition metal. It has a well shielded [Ne] noble gas core rather than the less well shielded [Ar]3d^{10}, [Kr]4d^{10} or [Xe]4f^{14}5d^{10} core of the post-transition metals. The small radius of the aluminium ion combined with its high charge make it a strongly polarizing species, prone to covalency.

Aluminium in pure form is a soft metal (MH 3.0) with low mechanical strength. It has a close-packed structure (BCN 12) showing some evidence of partially directional bonding. (Note: The partially directional bonding in aluminium improves its shear strength but means that ultrahigh-purity aluminium cannot maintain work hardening at room temperature.) It has a low melting point and a high thermal conductivity. Its strength is halved at 200 °C, and for many of its alloys is minimal at 300 °C. The latter three properties of aluminium limit its use to situations where fire protection is not required, or necessitate the provision of increased fire protection. (Note: Without the use of thermal insulation and detailed structural design attention, aluminium's low melting point and high thermal conductivity mitigate against its use, for example, in military ship construction—should a ship burn, the low melting point results in structural collapse; the high thermal conductivity helps spread the fire. Its use in the construction of cargo ships is limited as little or no economic advantage is gained over steel, once the cost and weight of fitting thermal insulation is taken into account.) It bonds covalently in most of its compounds; has an amphoteric oxide; and can form anionic aluminates. Aluminium forms Zintl phases such as LiAl, Ca_{3}Al_{2}Sb_{6}, and SrAl_{2}. A thin protective layer of oxide confers a reasonable degree of corrosion resistance. It is susceptible to attack in low pH (<4) and high (> 8.5) pH conditions, (Note: Aluminium can be attacked, for example, by alkaline detergents (including those used in dishwashers); by wet concrete, and by highly acidic foods such as tomatoes, rhubarb or cabbage. It is not attacked by nitric acid.) a phenomenon that is generally more pronounced in the case of commercial purity aluminium and aluminium alloys. Given many of these properties and its proximity to the dividing line between metals and nonmetals, aluminium is occasionally classified as a metalloid. (Note: See the list of metalloid lists for references) Despite its shortcomings, it has a good strength-to-weight ratio and excellent ductility; its mechanical strength can be improved considerably with the use of alloying additives; its very high thermal conductivity can be put to good use in heat sinks and heat exchangers; and it has a high electrical conductivity. (Note: Aluminium wire is used in electrical transmission lines for the distribution of power but, on account of its low breaking strength, is reinforced with a central core of galvanised steel wire.) At lower temperatures, aluminium increases its deformation strength (as do most materials) whilst maintaining ductility (as do face-centred cubic metals generally). Chemically, bulk aluminium is a strongly electropositive metal, with a high negative electrode potential. (Note: In the absence of protective measures, the relatively high electropositivity of aluminium renders it susceptible to galvanic corrosion when in physical or electrical contact with other metals such as copper or steel, especially when exposed to saline media, such as sea water or wind-blown sea spray.)

Gallium is a soft, brittle metal (MH 1.5) that melts at only a few degrees above room temperature. It has an unusual crystalline structure featuring mixed metallic-covalent bonding and low symmetry (BCN 7 i.e. 1+2+2+2). It bonds covalently in most of its compounds, has an amphoteric oxide; and can form anionic gallates. Gallium forms Zintl phases such as Li_{2}Ga_{7}, K_{3}Ga_{13} and YbGa_{2}. It is slowly oxidized in moist air at ambient conditions; a protective film of oxide prevents further corrosion.

Indium is a soft, highly ductile metal (MH 1.0) with a low tensile strength. It has a partially distorted crystalline structure (BCN 4+8) associated with incompletely ionised atoms. The tendency of indium '...to form covalent compounds is one of the more important properties influencing its electrochemical behavior'. The oxides of indium in its preferred oxidation state of +3, namely In_{2}O_{3} and In(OH)_{3} are weakly amphoteric; it forms anionic indates in strongly basic solutions. Indium forms Zintl phases such as LiIn, Na_{2}In and Rb_{2}In_{3}. Indium does not oxidize in air at ambient conditions.

Thallium is a soft, reactive metal (MH 1.0), so much so that it has no structural uses. It has a close-packed crystalline structure (BCN 6+6) but an abnormally large interatomic distance that has been attributed to partial ionisation of the thallium atoms. Although compounds in the +1 (mostly ionic) oxidation state are the more numerous, thallium has an appreciable chemistry in the +3 (largely covalent) oxidation state, as seen in its chalcogenides and trihalides. It and aluminium are the only Group 13 elements to react with air at room temperature, slowly forming the amphoteric oxide Tl_{2}O_{3}. It forms anionic thallates such as Tl_{3}TlO_{3}, Na_{3}Tl(OH)_{6}, NaTlO_{2}, and KTlO_{2}, and is present as the Tl^{−} thallide anion in the compound CsTl. Thallium forms Zintl phases, such as Na_{2}Tl, Na_{2}K_{21}Tl_{19}, CsTl and Sr_{5}Tl_{3}H.

Nihonium is expected to have a hexagonal close-packed crystalline structure, albeit based on extrapolation from those of the lighter group 13 elements: its density is expected to be around 16 g/cm^{3}. A standard electrode potential of +0.6 V is predicted for the Nh^{+}/Nh couple. The relativistic stabilisation of the 7s electrons is very high and hence nihonium should predominantly form the +1 oxidation state; nevertheless, as for copernicium, the +3 oxidation state should be reachable. Because of the shell closure at flerovium caused by spin-orbit coupling, nihonium is also one 7p electron short of a closed shell and would hence form a −1 oxidation state; in both the +1 and −1 oxidation states, nihonium should show more similarities to astatine than thallium. The Nh^{+} ion is expected to also have some similarities to the Ag^{+} ion, particularly in its propensity for complexation. Nihonium oxide (Nh_{2}O) is expected to be amphoteric.

=== Group 14 ===
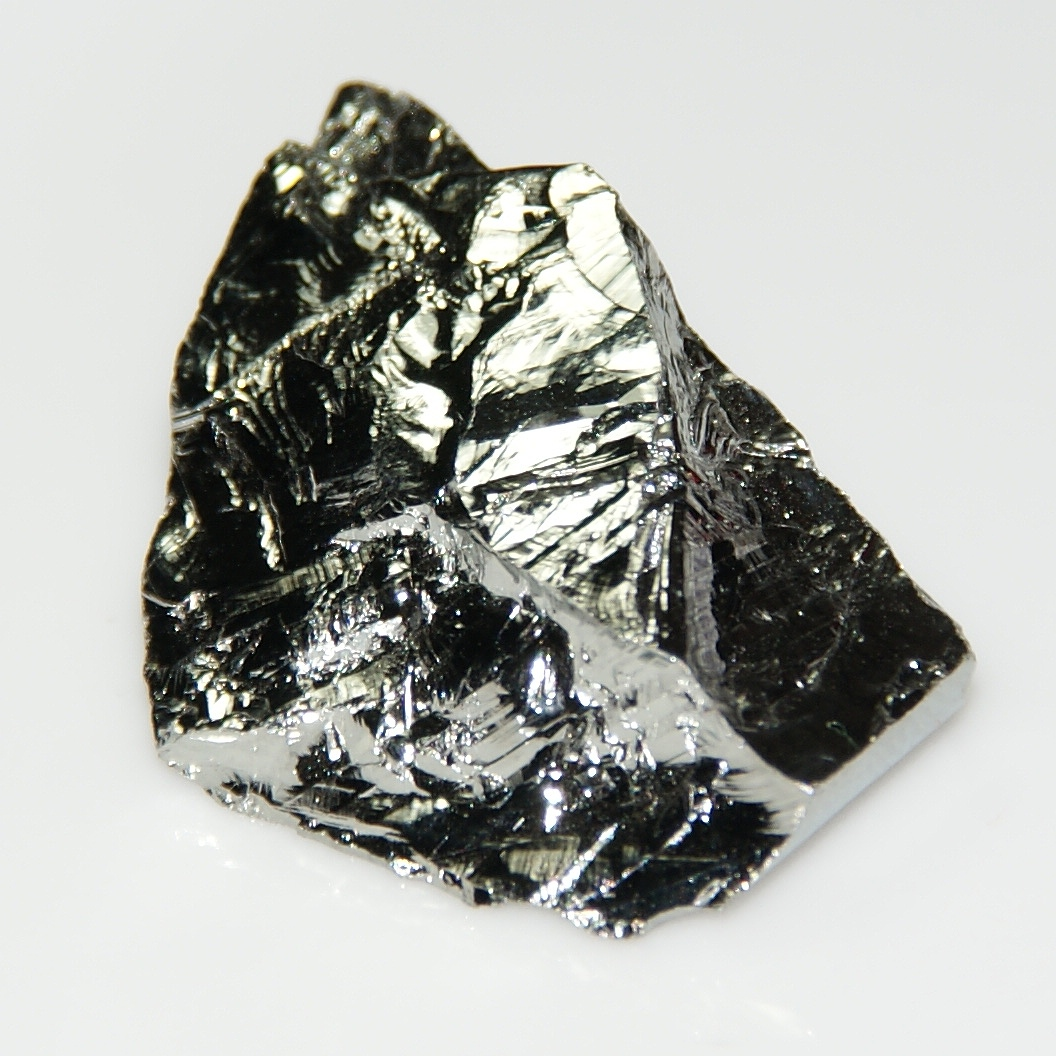
Germanium

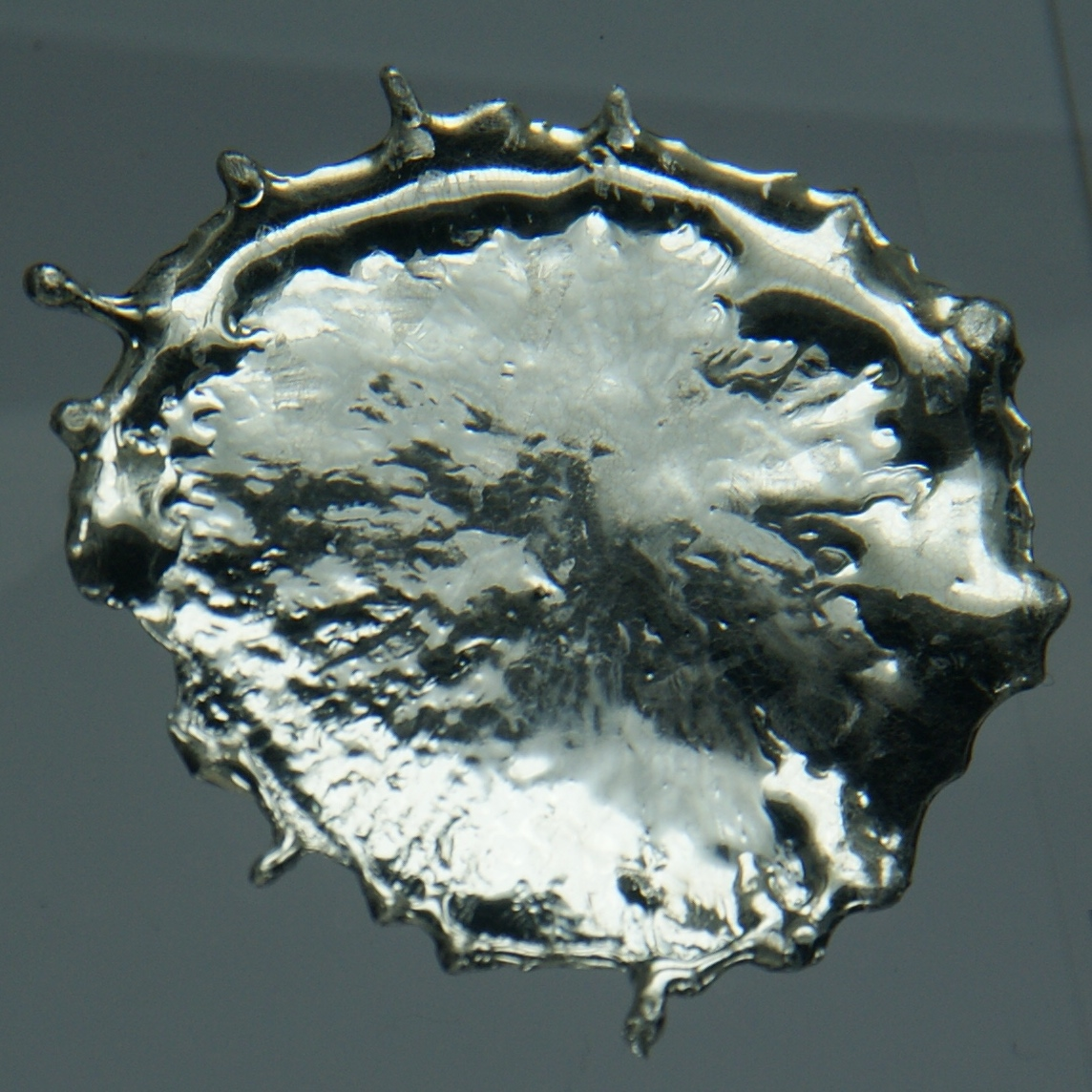
Tin

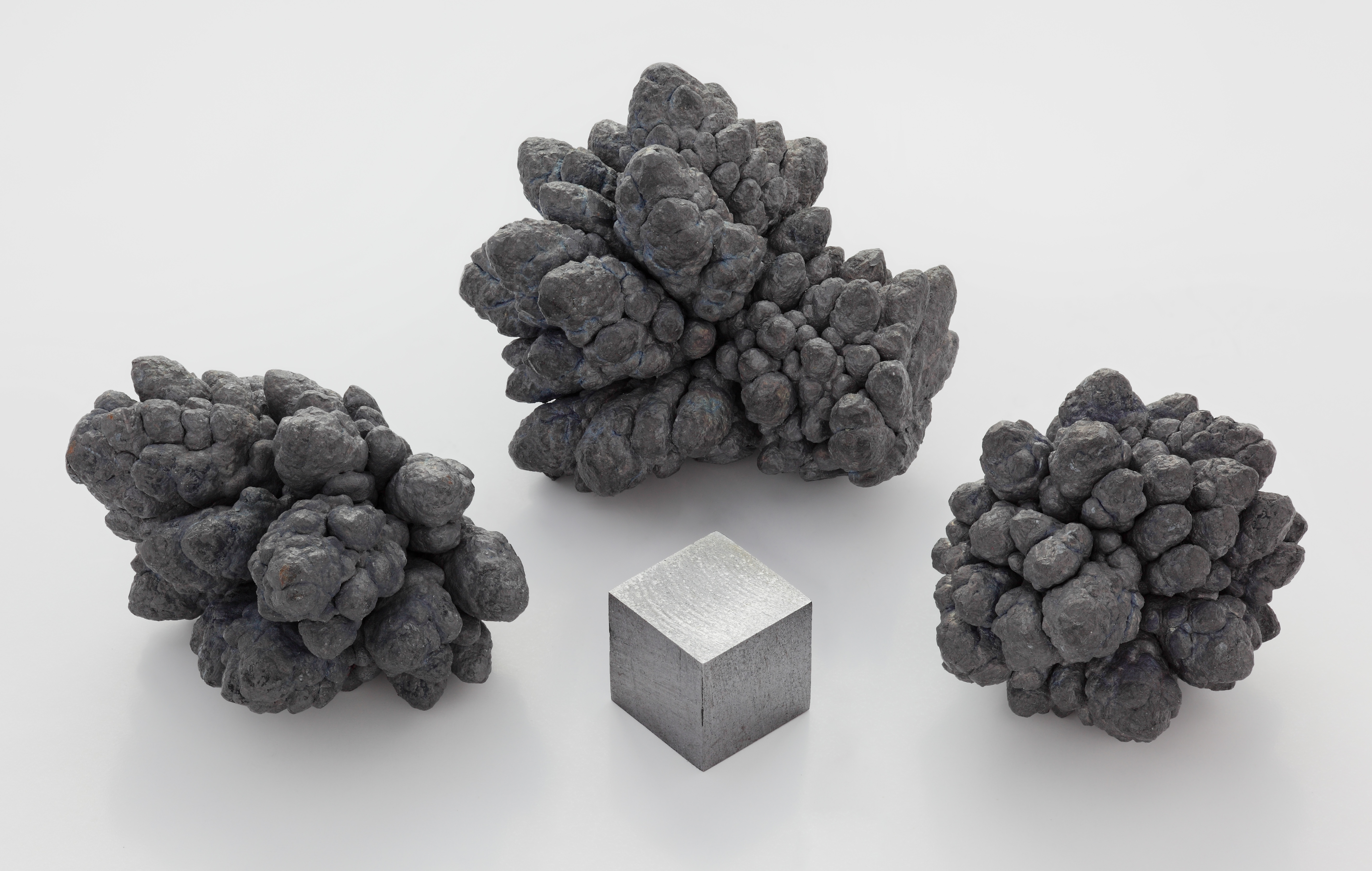
Lead

Germanium is a hard (MH 6), very brittle semi-metallic element. It was originally thought to be a poorly conducting metal but has the electronic band structure of a semiconductor. Germanium is usually considered to be a metalloid rather than a metal. Like carbon (as diamond) and silicon, it has a covalent tetrahedral crystalline structure (BCN 4). Compounds in its preferred oxidation state of +4 are covalent. Germanium forms an amphoteric oxide, GeO_{2} and anionic germanates, such as Mg_{2}GeO_{4}. It forms Zintl phases such as LiGe, K_{8}Ge_{44} and La_{4}Ge_{3}.

Tin is a soft, exceptionally weak metal (MH 1.5); (Note: Charles, Crane and Furness write that, 'Most metals, except perhaps lead and tin, can be alloyed to give [yield] strengths that lie in the upper two-thirds of the low-strength range…') a 1-cm thick rod will bend easily under mild finger pressure. It has an irregularly coordinated crystalline structure (BCN 4+2) associated with incompletely ionised atoms. All of the Group 14 elements form compounds in which they are in the +4, predominantly covalent, oxidation state; even in the +2 oxidation state tin generally forms covalent bonds. The oxides of tin in its preferred oxidation state of +2, namely SnO and Sn(OH)_{2}, are amphoteric; it forms stannites in strongly basic solutions. Below 13 °C (55.4 °F) tin changes its structure and becomes 'grey tin', which has the same structure as diamond, silicon and germanium (BCN 4). This transformation causes ordinary tin to crumble and disintegrate since, as well as being brittle, grey tin occupies more volume due to having a less efficient crystalline packing structure. Tin forms Zintl phases such as Na_{4}Sn, BaSn, K_{8}Sn_{25} and Ca_{31}Sn_{20}. It has good corrosion resistance in air on account of forming a thin protective oxide layer. Pure tin has no structural uses. It is used in solders, and as a hardening agent in alloys of other metals, such as copper, lead, titanium and zinc.

Lead is a soft metal (MH 1.5, but hardens close to melting) which, in many cases, is unable to support its own weight. It has a close-packed structure (BCN 12) but an abnormally large inter-atomic distance that has been attributed to partial ionisation of the lead atoms. It forms a semi-covalent dioxide PbO_{2}; a covalently bonded sulfide PbS; covalently bonded halides; and a range of covalently bonded organolead compounds such as the lead(II) mercaptan Pb(SC_{2}H_{5})_{2}, lead tetra-acetate Pb(CH_{3}CO_{2})_{4}, and the once common, anti-knock additive, tetra-ethyl lead (CH_{3}CH_{2})_{4}Pb. The oxide of lead in its preferred oxidation state (PbO; +2) is amphoteric; it forms anionic plumbates in strongly basic solutions. Lead forms Zintl phases such as CsPb, Sr_{31}Pb_{20}, La_{5}Pb_{3}N and Yb_{3}Pb_{20}. It has reasonable to good corrosion resistance; in moist air it forms a mixed gray coating of oxide, carbonate and sulfate that hinders further oxidation.

Flerovium is expected to be a liquid metal due to spin-orbit coupling "tearing" apart the 7p subshell, so that its 7s^{2}7p_{1/2}^{2} valence configuration forms a quasi-closed shell similar to those of mercury and copernicium. Solid flerovium should have a face-centered cubic structure and be a rather dense metal, with a density of around 14 g/cm^{3}. Flerovium is expected to have a standard electrode potential of +0.9 V for the Fl^{2+}/Fl couple. Flerovium oxide (FlO) is expected to be amphoteric, forming anionic flerovates in basic solutions.

=== Group 15 ===
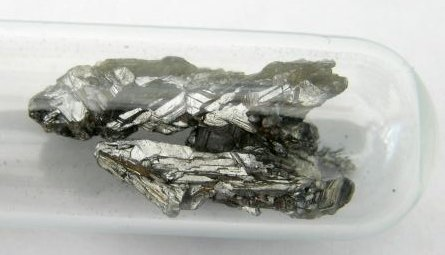
Arsenic

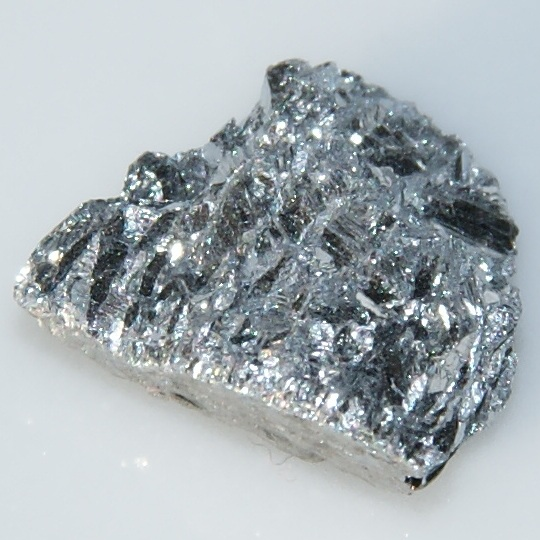
Antimony

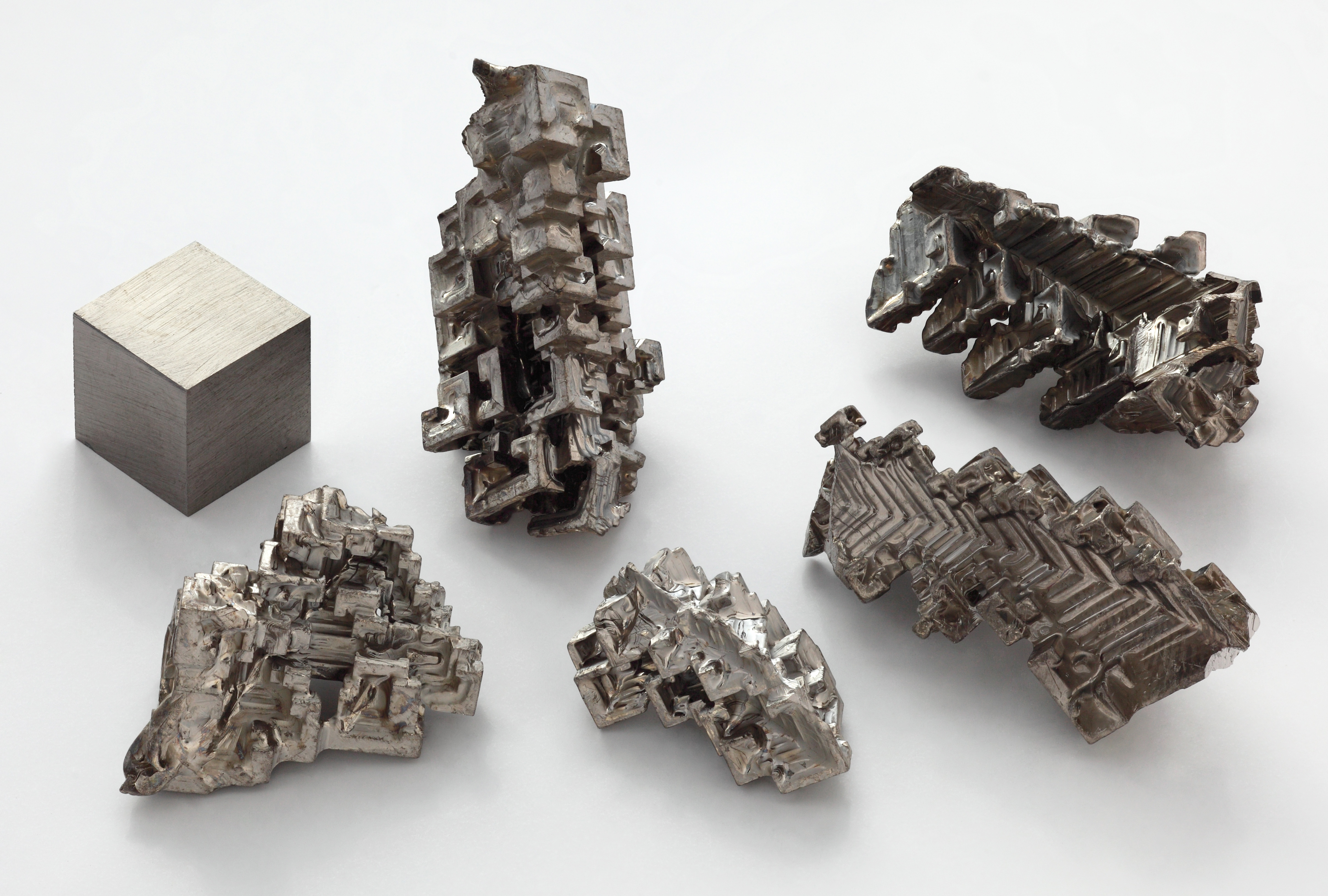
Bismuth

Arsenic is a moderately hard (MH 3.5) and brittle semi-metallic element. It is commonly regarded as a metalloid, or by some other authors as either a metal or a non-metal. It exhibits poor electrical conductivity which, like a metal, decreases with temperature. It has a relatively open and partially covalent crystalline structure (BCN 3+3). Arsenic forms covalent bonds with most other elements. The oxide in its preferred oxidation state (As_{2}O_{3}, +3) is amphoteric, (Note: As_{2}O_{3} is usually regarded as being amphoteric but a few sources say it is (weakly) acidic. They describe its "basic" properties (its reaction with concentrated hydrochloric acid to form arsenic trichloride) as being alcoholic, in analogy with the formation of covalent alkyl chlorides by covalent alcohols (e.g., R-OH + HCl → RCl + H_{2}O)) as is the corresponding oxoacid in aqueous solution (H_{3}AsO_{3}) and congener sulfide (As_{2}S_{3}). Arsenic forms a series of anionic arsenates such as Na_{3}AsO_{3} and PbHAsO_{4}, and Zintl phases such as Na_{3}As, Ca_{2}As and SrAs_{3}.

Antimony is a soft (MH 3.0) and brittle semi-metallic element. It is commonly regarded as a metalloid, or by some other authors as either a metal or a non-metal. It exhibits poor electrical conductivity which, like a metal, decreases with temperature. It has a relatively open and partially covalent crystalline structure (BCN 3+3). Antimony forms covalent bonds with most other elements. The oxide in its preferred oxidation state (Sb_{2}O_{3}, +3) is amphoteric. Antimony forms a series of anionic antimonites and antimonates such as NaSbO_{2} and AlSbO_{4}, and Zintl phases such as K_{5}Sb_{4}, Sr_{2}Sb_{3} and BaSb_{3}.

Bismuth is a soft metal (MH 2.5) that is too brittle for any structural use. It has an open-packed crystalline structure (BCN 3+3) with bonding that is intermediate between metallic and covalent. For a metal, it has exceptionally low electrical and thermal conductivity. Most of the ordinary compounds of bismuth are covalent in nature. The oxide, Bi_{2}O_{3} is predominantly basic but will act as a weak acid in warm, very concentrated KOH. It can also be fused with potassium hydroxide in air, resulting in a brown mass of potassium bismuthate. The solution chemistry of bismuth is characterised by the formation of oxyanions; it forms anionic bismuthates in strongly basic solutions. Bismuth forms Zintl phases such as NaBi, Rb_{7}In_{4}Bi_{6} and Ba_{11}Cd_{8}Bi_{14}. Bailar et al. refer to bismuth as being, 'the least "metallic" metal in its physical properties' given its brittle nature (and possibly) 'the lowest electrical conductivity of all metals.' (Note: Which metal has the lowest electrical conductivity is debatable but bismuth is certainly in the lowest cohort; Hoffman refers to bismuth as 'a poor metal, on the verge of being a semiconductor.')

Moscovium is expected to be a quite reactive metal. A standard reduction potential of −1.5 V for the Mc^{+}/Mc couple is expected. This increased reactivity is consistent with the quasi-closed shell of flerovium and the beginning of a new series of elements with the filling of the loosely bound 7p_{3/2} subshell, and is rather different from the relative nobility of bismuth. Like thallium, moscovium should have a common +1 oxidation state and a less common +3 oxidation state, although their relative stabilities may change depending on the complexing ligands or the degree of hydrolysis. Moscovium(I) oxide (Mc_{2}O) should be quite basic, like that of thallium, while moscovium(III) oxide (Mc_{2}O_{3}) should be amphoteric, like that of bismuth.

=== Group 16 ===
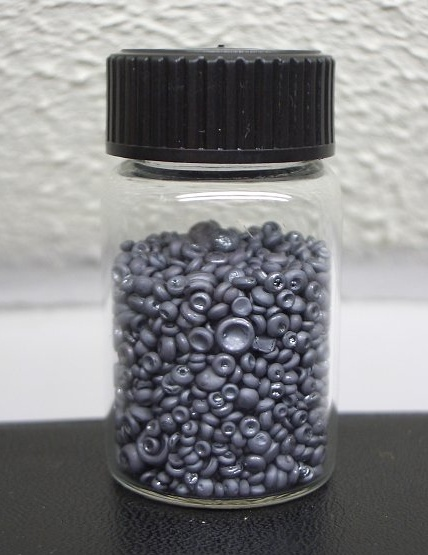
Selenium

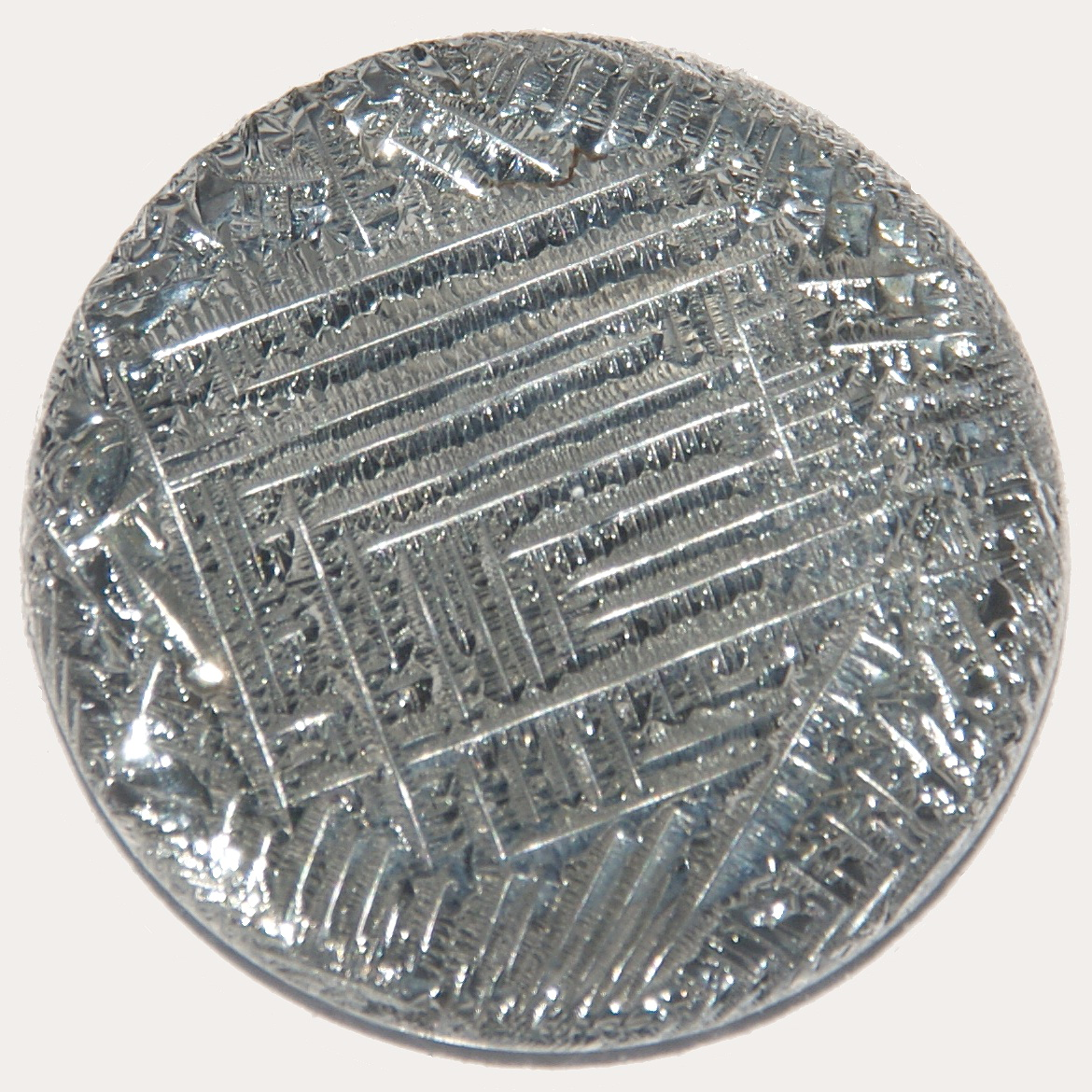
Tellurium

Selenium is a soft (MH 2.0) and brittle semi-metallic element. It is commonly regarded as a nonmetal, but is sometimes considered a metalloid or even a heavy metal. Selenium has a hexagonal polyatomic (CN 2) crystalline structure. It is a semiconductor with a band gap of 1.7 eV, and a photoconductor meaning its electrical conductivity increases a million-fold when illuminated. Selenium forms covalent bonds with most other elements, noting it can form ionic selenides with highly electropositive metals. The common oxide of selenium (SeO_{3}) is strongly acidic. Selenium forms a series of anionic selenites and selenates such as Na_{2}SeO_{3}, Na_{2}Se_{2}O_{5}, and Na_{2}SeO_{4}, as well as Zintl phases such as Cs_{4}Se_{16}.

Tellurium is a soft (MH 2.25) and brittle semi-metallic element. It is commonly regarded as a metalloid, or by some authors either as a metal or a non-metal. Tellurium has a polyatomic (CN 2) hexagonal crystalline structure. It is a semiconductor with a band gap of 0.32 to 0.38 eV. Tellurium forms covalent bonds with most other elements, noting it has an extensive organometallic chemistry and that many tellurides can be regarded as metallic alloys. The common oxide of tellurium (TeO_{2}) is amphoteric. Tellurium forms a series of anionic tellurites and tellurates such as Na_{2}TeO_{3}, Na_{6}TeO_{6}, and Rb_{6}Te_{2}O_{9} (the last containing tetrahedral TeO^{2−}_{4} and trigonal bipyramidal TeO^{4−}_{5} anions), as well as Zintl phases such as NaTe_{3}.

Polonium is a radioactive, soft metal with a hardness similar to lead. It has a simple cubic crystalline structure characterised (as determined by electron density calculations) by partially directional bonding, and a BCN of 6. Such a structure ordinarily results in very low ductility and fracture resistance however polonium has been predicted to be a ductile metal. It forms a covalent hydride; its halides are covalent, volatile compounds, resembling those of tellurium. The oxide of polonium in its preferred oxidation state (PoO_{2}; +4) is predominantly basic, but amphoteric if dissolved in concentrated aqueous alkali, or fused with potassium hydroxide in air. The yellow polonate(IV) ion PoO^{2−}_{3} is known in aqueous solutions of low Cl^{‒} concentration and high pH. (Note: Bagnall writes that the fusion of polonium dioxide with a potassium chlorate/hydroxide mixture yields a bluish solid which, '...presumably contains some potassium polonate.') Polonides such as Na_{2}Po, BePo, ZnPo, CdPo and HgPo feature Po^{2−} anions; except for HgPo these are some of the more stable of the polonium compounds. (Note: Bagnall noted that the rare-earth polonides have the greatest thermal stability of any polonium compound.)

Livermorium is expected to be less reactive than moscovium. The standard reduction potential of the Lv^{2+}/Lv couple is expected to be around +0.1 V. It should be most stable in the +2 oxidation state; the 7p_{3/2} electrons are expected to be so weakly bound that the first two ionisation potentials of livermorium should lie between those of the reactive alkaline earth metals magnesium and calcium. The +4 oxidation state should only be reachable with the most electronegative ligands. Livermorium(II) oxide (LvO) should be basic and livermorium(IV) oxide (LvO_{2}) should be amphoteric, analogous to polonium.

=== Group 17 ===
Astatine is a radioactive element that has never been seen; a visible quantity would immediately be vaporised due to its intense radioactivity. It may be possible to prevent this with sufficient cooling. Astatine is commonly regarded as a nonmetal, less commonly as a metalloid and occasionally as a metal. Unlike its lighter congener iodine, evidence for diatomic astatine is sparse and inconclusive. In 2013, on the basis of relativistic modelling, astatine was predicted to be a monatomic metal, with a face-centered cubic crystalline structure. As such, astatine could be expected to have a metallic appearance; show metallic conductivity; and have excellent ductility, even at cryogenic temperatures. It could also be expected to show significant nonmetallic character, as is normally the case for metals in, or in the vicinity of, the p-block. Astatine oxyanions AtO^{−}, AtO^{−}_{3} and AtO^{−}_{4} are known, oxyanion formation being a tendency of nonmetals. The hydroxide of astatine At(OH) is presumed to be amphoteric. (Note: Eagleson refers to the OH compound of astatine as hypoastatous acid HAtO; Pimpentel and Spratley give the formula for hypoastatous acid as HOAt.) Astatine forms covalent compounds with nonmetals, including hydrogen astatide HAt and carbon tetraastatide CAt_{4}. (Note: In hydrogen astatide the negative charge is predicted to be on the hydrogen atom, implying that this compound should instead be referred to as astatine hydride (AtH).) At^{−} anions have been reported to form astatides with silver, thallium, palladium and lead. Pruszyński et al. note that astatide ions should form strong complexes with soft metal cations such as Hg^{2+}, Pd^{2+}, Ag^{+} and Tl^{3+}; they list the astatide formed with mercury as Hg(OH)At.

Tennessine, despite being in the halogen column of the periodic table, is expected to go even further towards metallicity than astatine due to its small electron affinity. The −1 state should not be important for tennessine and its major oxidation states should be +1 and +3, with +3 more stable: Ts^{3+} is expected to behave similarly to Au^{3+} in halide media. As such, tennessine oxide (Ts_{2}O_{3}) is expected to be amphoteric, similar to gold oxide and astatine(III) oxide.

=== Group 18 ===
Oganesson is expected to be a very poor "noble gas" and may even be metallised by its large atomic radius and the weak binding of the easily removed 7p_{3/2} electrons: certainly it is expected to be a quite reactive element that is solid at room temperature and has some similarities to tin, as one effect of the spin–orbit splitting of the 7p subshell is a "partial role reversal" of groups 14 and 18. Due to the immense polarisability of oganesson, it is expected that not only oganesson(II) fluoride but also oganesson(IV) fluoride should be predominantly ionic, involving the formation of Og^{2+} and Og^{4+} cations. Oganesson(II) oxide (OgO) and oganesson(IV) oxide (OgO_{2}) are both expected to be amphoteric, similar to the oxides of tin.

== Aliases and related groupings ==
=== B-subgroup metals ===
Superficially, the B-subgroup metals are the metals in Groups IB to VIIB of the periodic table, corresponding to groups 11 to 17 using current IUPAC nomenclature. Practically, the group 11 metals (copper, silver and gold) are ordinarily regarded as transition metals (or sometimes as coinage metals, or noble metals) whereas the group 12 metals (zinc, cadmium, and mercury) may or may not be treated as B-subgroup metals depending on if the transition metals are taken to end at group 11 or group 12. The 'B' nomenclature (as in Groups IB, IIB, and so on) was superseded in 1988 but is still occasionally encountered in more recent literature. (Note: Greenwood and Earnshaw refer to the B-subgroup metals as post-transition elements: 'Arsenic and antimony are classed as metalloids or semi-metals and bismuth is a typical B sub-group (post-transition-element) metal like tin and lead.')

The B-subgroup metals show nonmetallic properties; this is particularly apparent in moving from group 12 to group 16. Although the group 11 metals have normal close-packed metallic structures they show an overlap in chemical properties. In their +1 compounds (the stable state for silver; less so for copper) they are typical B-subgroup metals. In their +2 and +3 states their chemistry is typical of transition metal compounds.

==== Pseudo metals and hybrid metals ====
The B-subgroup metals can be subdivided into pseudo metals and hybrid metals. The pseudo metals (groups 12 and 13, including boron) are said to behave more like true metals (groups 1 to 11) than non-metals. The hybrid metals As, Sb, Bi, Te, Po, At — which other authors would call metalloids — partake about equally the properties of both. The pseudo metals can be considered related to the hybrid metals through the group 14 carbon column.

=== Base metals ===
Mingos writes that while the p-block metals are typical, that are not strongly reducing and that, as such, they are base metals requiring oxidizing acids to dissolve them.

=== Borderline metals ===
Parish writes that, 'as anticipated', the borderline metals of groups 13 and 14 have non-standard structures. Gallium, indium, thallium, germanium, and tin are specifically mentioned in this context. The group 12 metals are also noted as having slightly distorted structures; this has been interpreted as evidence of weak directional (i.e. covalent) bonding. (Note: Aluminium is identified by Parish, along with germanium, antimony and bismuth, as being a metal on the boundary line between metals and non-metals; he suggests that all these elements are 'probably better classed as metalloids.')

=== Chemically weak metals ===
Rayner-Canham and Overton use the term chemically weak metals to refer to the metals close to the metal-nonmetal borderline. These metals behave chemically more like the metalloids, particularly with respect to anionic species formation. The nine chemically weak metals identified by them are beryllium, magnesium, aluminium, gallium, tin, lead, antimony, bismuth, and polonium. (Note: Pauling, in contrast, refers to the strong metals in Groups 1 and 2 (that form ionic compounds with 'the strong nonmetals in the upper right corner of the periodic table.').)

=== Frontier metals ===
Vernon uses the term "frontier metal" to refer to the class of chemically weak metals adjacent to the dividing line between metals. He notes that several of them "are further distinguished by a series of…knight's move relationships, formed between one element and the element one period down and two groups to its right." For example, copper(I) chemistry resembles indium(I) chemistry: "both ions are found mostly in solid-state compounds such as CuCl and InCl; the fluorides are unknown for both ions while the iodides are the most stable." The name frontier metal is adapted from Russell and Lee, who wrote that, "…bismuth and group 16 element polonium are generally considered to be metals, although they occupy 'frontier territory' on the periodic table, adjacent to the nonmetals."

=== Fusible metals ===
Cardarelli, writing in 2008, categorizes zinc, cadmium, mercury, gallium, indium, thallium, tin, lead, antimony and bismuth as fusible metals. Nearly 100 years earlier, Louis (1911) noted that fusible metals were alloys containing tin, cadmium, lead, and bismuth in various proportions, "the tin ranging from 10 to 20%."

=== Heavy metals (of low melting point) ===
Van Wert grouped the periodic table metals into a. the light metals; b. the heavy brittle metals of high melting point, c. the heavy ductile metals of high melting point; d. the heavy metals of low melting point (Zn, Cd, Hg; Ga, In, Tl; Ge, Sn; As, Sb, Bi; and Po), and e. the strong, electropositive metals. Britton, Abbatiello and Robins speak of 'the soft, low melting point, heavy metals in columns lIB, IlIA, IVA, and VA of the periodic table, namely Zn, Cd, Hg; Al, Ga, In, Tl; [Si], Ge, Sn, Pb; and Bi. The Sargent-Welch Chart of the Elements groups the metals into: light metals, the lanthanide series; the actinide series; heavy metals (brittle); heavy metals (ductile); and heavy metals (low melting point): Zn, Cd, Hg, [Cn]; Al, Ga, In, Tl; Ge, Sn, Pb, [Fl]; Sb, Bi; and Po. (Note: Hawkes, attempting to address the question of what is a heavy metal, commented that, 'Being a heavy metal has little to do with density, but rather concerns chemical properties'. He observed that, 'It may mean different things to different people, but as I have used, heard and interpreted the term over the last half-century, it refers to metals with insoluble sulfides and hydroxides, whose salts produce colored solutions in water, and whose complexes are usually colored.' He goes on to note that, 'The metals I have seen referred to as heavy metals comprise a block of all the metals in Groups 3 to 16 that are in periods 4 and greater. It may also be stated as the transition metals and post-transition metals.)

=== Less typical metals ===
Habashi groups the elements into eight major categories: [1] typical metals (alkali metals, alkaline earth metals, and aluminium); [2] lanthanides (Ce–Lu); [3] actinides (Th–Lr); [4] transition metals (Sc, Y, La, Ac, groups 4–10); [5] less typical metals (groups 11–12, Ga, In, Tl, Sn and Pb); [6] metalloids (B, Si, Ge, As, Se, Sb, Te, Bi and Po); [7] covalent nonmetals (H, C, N, O, P, S and the halogens); and [8] monatomic nonmetals (that is, the noble gases).

=== Metametals ===
The metametals are zinc, cadmium, mercury, indium, thallium, tin and lead. They are ductile elements but, compared to their metallic periodic table neighbours to the left, have lower melting points, relatively low electrical and thermal conductivities, and show distortions from close-packed forms. Sometimes beryllium and gallium are included as metametals despite having low ductility.

=== Ordinary metals ===
Abrikosov distinguishes between ordinary metals, and transition metals where the inner shells are not filled. The ordinary metals have lower melting points and cohesive energies than those of the transition metals. Gray identifies as ordinary metals: aluminium, gallium, indium, thallium, nihonium, tin, lead, flerovium, bismuth, moscovium, and livermorium. He adds that, 'in reality most of the metals that people think of as ordinary are in fact transition metals...'.

=== Other metals ===
As noted, the metals falling between the transition metals and the metalloids on the periodic table are sometimes called other metals (see also, for example, Taylor et al.). 'Other' in this sense has the related meanings of, 'existing besides, or distinct from, that already mentioned' (that is, the alkali and alkaline earth metals, the lanthanides and actinides, and the transition metals); 'auxiliary'; 'ancillary, secondary'. According to Gray there should be a better name for these elements than 'other metals'.

=== p-block metals ===
The p-block metals are the metals in groups 13‒16 of the periodic table. Usually, this includes aluminium, gallium, indium and thallium; tin and lead; and bismuth. Germanium, antimony and polonium are sometimes also included, although the first two are commonly recognised as metalloids. The p-block metals tend to have structures that display low coordination numbers and directional bonding. Pronounced covalency is found in their compounds; the majority of their oxides are amphoteric.

Aluminium is an undisputed p-block element by group membership and its [Ne] 3s^{2} 3p^{1} electron configuration, but aluminium does not literally come after transition metals unlike p-block metals from period 4 and on. The epithet "post-transition" in reference to aluminium is a misnomer, and aluminium normally has no d electrons unlike all other p-block metals.

=== Peculiar metals ===
Slater divides the metals 'fairly definitely, though not perfectly sharply' into the ordinary metals and the peculiar metals, the latter of which verge on the nonmetals. The peculiar metals occur towards the ends of the rows of the periodic table and include 'approximately:' gallium, indium, and thallium; carbon, silicon '(both of which have some metallic properties, though we have previously treated them as nonmetals),' germanium and tin; arsenic, antimony, and bismuth; and selenium '(which is partly metallic)' and tellurium. The ordinary metals have centro-symmetrical crystalline structures (Note: On manganese, Slater says, '[It] is a very peculiar and anomalous exception to the general order of the elements. It is the only definite metal, far from the nonmetals in the table, which has a complicated structure.') whereas the peculiar metals have structures involving directional bonding. More recently, Joshua observed that the peculiar metals have mixed metallic-covalent bonding.

=== Poor metals ===
Farrell and Van Sicien use the term poor metal, for simplicity, 'to denote one with a significant covalent, or directional character.' Hill and Holman observe that, 'The term poor metals is not widely used, but it is a useful description for several metals including tin, lead and bismuth. These metals fall in a triangular block of the periodic table to the right of the transition metals. They are usually low in the activity (electrochemical) series and they have some resemblances to non-metals.' Reid et al. write that 'poor metals' is, '[A]n older term for metallic elements in Groups 13‒15 of the periodic table that are softer and have lower melting points than the metals traditionally used for tools.'

=== Post-transition metals ===
An early usage of this name is recorded by Deming, in 1940, in his well-known book Fundamental Chemistry. He treated the transition metals as finishing at group 10 (nickel, palladium and platinum). He referred to the ensuing elements in periods 4 to 6 of the periodic table (copper to germanium; silver to antimony; gold to polonium)—in view of their underlying d^{10} electronic configurations—as post-transition metals.

=== Semimetals ===
In modern use, the term 'semimetal' sometimes refers, loosely or explicitly, to metals with incomplete metallic character in crystalline structure, electrical conductivity or electronic structure. Examples include gallium, ytterbium, bismuth, mercury and neptunium. Metalloids, which are in-between elements that are neither metals nor nonmetals, are also sometimes instead called semimetals. The elements commonly recognised as metalloids are boron, silicon, germanium, arsenic, antimony and tellurium. In old chemistry, before the publication in 1789 of Lavoisier's 'revolutionary' Elementary Treatise on Chemistry, a semimetal was a metallic element with 'very imperfect ductility and malleability' such as zinc, mercury or bismuth.

=== Soft metals ===
Scott and Kanda refer to the metals in groups 11 to 15, plus platinum in group 10, as soft metals, excluding the very active metals, in groups 1−3. They note many important non-ferrous alloys are made from metals in this class, including sterling silver, brass (copper and zinc), and bronzes (copper with tin, manganese and nickel).

=== Transition metals ===
Historically, the transition metal series "includes those elements of the Periodic Table which 'bridge the gap' between the very electropositive alkali and allkaline earth metals and the electronegative non-metals of the groups: nitrogen-phosphorus, oxygen-sulfur, and the halogens." Cheronis, Parsons and Ronneberg wrote that, "The transition metals of low melting point form a block in the Periodic Table: those of Groups II 'b' [zinc, cadmium, mercury], III 'b' [aluminium, gallium, indium, thallium], and germanium, tin and lead in Group IV. These metals all have melting points below 425 °C." (Note: In fact, both aluminium (660.32) and germanium (938.25) have melting points greater than 425°C.)

== Sources ==
=== Indexed references ===
- Abd-El-Aziz AS, Carraher CE, Pittman CU, Sheats JE & Zeldin M 2003, Macromolecules Containing Metal and Metal-Like Elements, vol. 1, A Half-Century of Metal- and Metalloid-Containing Polymers, John Wiley & Sons, Hoboken, New Jersey, ISBN 0-471-45832-5
- Abrikosov AA 1988, Fundamentals of the theory of metals, North Holland, Amsterdam, ISBN 0-444-87094-6
- Aleandri LE & Bogdanović B 2008, 'The magnesium route to active metals and intermetallics, in A Fürstner (ed.), Active metals: Preparation, characterization, applications, VCH Verlagsgesellschalt, Weinheim, ISBN 3-527-29207-1, pp. 299‒338
- Alhassan SJ & Goodwin FE 2005, Lead and Alloys, in R Baboian (ed), 'Corrosion Tests and Standards: Application and Interpretation,' 2nd ed., ASTM International, West Conshohocken, PA, pp. 531–6, ISBN 0-8031-2098-2
- Arndt N & Ganino C 2012, Metals and Society: An Introduction to Economic Geology, Springer-Verlag, Berlin, ISBN 978-3-642-22995-4
- Atkins P, Overton T, Rourke J, Weller M & Armstrong F 2006, Shriver & Atkins inorganic chemistry, 4th ed., Oxford University Press, Oxford, ISBN 978-0-19-926463-6
- Atkins P & de Paula J 2011, Physical Chemistry for the Life Sciences, 2nd ed., Oxford University, Oxford, ISBN 978-0-19-956428-6
- Aylward G & Findlay T 2008, SI chemical data, 6th ed., John Wiley, Milton, Queensland, ISBN 978-0-470-81638-7
- Bagnall KW 1962, 'The chemistry of polonium,' in HHJ Emeleus & AG Sharpe (eds), Advances in inorganic chemistry and radiochemistry, vol. 4, Academic Press, New York, pp. 197‒230
- Bagnall KW 1966, The chemistry of selenium, tellurium and polonium, Elsevier, Amsterdam
- Bailar JC, Moeller T, Kleinberg J, Guss CO, Castellion ME & Metz C 1984, Chemistry, 2nd ed., Academic Press, Orlando, ISBN 0-12-072855-9
- Banthorpe, D. V.; Gatford, C.; Hollebone, B. R. (1968-01-01). "Gas Chromatographic Separation of Olefins and Aromatic Hydrocarbons Using Thallium(I)-Nitrate: Glycol as Stationary Phase". Journal of Chromatographic Science. 6 (1): 61–62. doi:10.1093/chromsci/6.1.61. ISSN 0021-9665.
- Bashilova NI & Khomutova, TV 1984, 'Thallates of alkali metals and monovalent thallium formed in aqueous solutions of their hydroxides', Russian Chemical Bulletin, vol. 33, no. 8, August, pp. 1543–47
- Benbow EM 2008, From paramagnetism to spin glasses: Magnetic studies of single crystal intermetallics, PhD dissertation, Florida State University
- Berei K & Vasáros L 1985 'General aspects of the chemistry of astatine', pp. 183–209, in Kugler & Keller
- Bharara MS & Atwood, DA 2005, 'Lead: Inorganic chemistry', Encyclopedia of inorganic chemistry, RB King (ed.), 2nd ed., John Wiley & Sons, New York, ISBN 978-0-470-86078-6
- Beamer WH & Maxwell CR 1946, Physical properties and crystal structure of polonium, Los Alamos Scientific Laboratory, Oak Ridge, Tennessee
- Bobev, Svilen; Sevov, Slavi C. (2002). "Five Ternary Zintl Phases in the Systems Alkali-Metal–Indium–Bismuth". Journal of Solid State Chemistry. 163 (2): 436–448. Bibcode:2002JSSCh.163..436B. doi:10.1006/jssc.2001.9423.
- Borsai, M 2005, 'Cadmium: Inorganic & coordination chemistry', in RB King (ed.), Encyclopedia of inorganic chemistry, 2nd ed., vol. 2, John Wiley & Sons, New York, pp. 603–19, ISBN 978-0-470-86078-6
- Braunović M 2000, 'Power Connectors', in PG Slade (ed.), Electrical Contacts: Principles and Applications, 2nd ed., CRC Press, Boca Raton, Florida, pp. 231–374, ISBN 978-1-4398-8130-9
- Britton RB, Abbatiello FJ & Robins KE 1972, 'Flux pumps and superconducting components, in Y Winterbottom (ed.), Proceedings of the 4th International Conference on Magnetic Technology, 19‒22 September 1972, Upton, New York, Atomic Energy Commission, Washington DC, pp. 703‒708
- Brown TE, LeMay HE, Bursten BE, Woodward P & Murphy C 2012, Chemistry: The Central Science, 12th ed., Pearson Education, Glenview, Illinois, ISBN 978-0-321-69672-4
- Busev, AI 1962, The analytical chemistry of indium, Pergamon, Oxford
- Cardarelli F 2008, Materials handbook: A concise desktop reference, 2nd ed., Springer-Verlag, Berlin, ISBN 978-1-84628-669-8
- Chambers C & Holliday AK 1975, Modern inorganic chemistry: An intermediate text, Butterworths, London, ISBN 0-408-70663-5
- Chandler H 1998, Metallurgy for the non-metallurgist, ASM International, Materials Park, Ohio, ISBN 0-87170-652-0
- Charles JA, Crane FAA & Furness JAG 1997, Selection and use of Engineering Materials, 3rd ed., Butterworth-Heinemann, Oxford, ISBN 0-7506-3277-1
- Cheemalapati K, Keleher J & Li Y 2008 'Key chemical components in metal CMP slurries', in Y Li (ed.), Microelectronic Applications of Chemical Mechanical Planarization, John Wiley & Sons, Hoboken, New Jersey, pp. 201–248, ISBN 0-471-71919-6
- Cheronis ND, Parsons JB & Ronneberg CE 1942, The study of the physical world, Houghton Mifflin Company, Boston
- Clegg AG & Dovaston NG 2003, 'Conductors and superconductors', in MA Laughton & DF Warne, Electrical engineer's reference book, 16th ed., Elsevier Science, Oxford, pp. 5/1–13, ISBN 0-7506-4637-3
- Cobb F 2009, Structural engineer's pocket book, 2nd ed., Elsevier, Oxford, ISBN 978-0-7506-8686-0
- Collings EW 1986, Applied Superconductivity, Metallurgy, and Physics of Titanium alloys, vol. 1, Plenum Press, New York, ISBN 0-306-41690-5
- Cooney RPJ & Hall JR 1966, 'Raman spectrum of thiomercurate(II) ion,' Australian Journal of Chemistry, vol. 19, pp. 2179–2180
- Cooper DG 1968, The periodic table, 4th ed., Butterworths, London
- Corbett JD 1996, 'Zintl phases of the early p-block elements', in SM Kauzlarich (ed.), Chemistry, structure and bonding of Zintl phases and ions, VCH, New York, ISBN 1-56081-900-6, pp. 139‒182
- Cotton FA, Wilkinson G, Murillo CA & Bochmann M 1999, Advanced inorganic chemistry, 6th ed., John Wiley & Sons, New York, ISBN 978-0-471-19957-1
- Cox PA 2004, Inorganic chemistry, 2nd ed., Instant notes series, Bios Scientific, London, ISBN 1-85996-289-0
- Cramer SD & Covino BS 2006, Corrosion: environments and industries, ASM Handbook, vol. 13C, ASM International, Metals Park, Ohio, ISBN 0-87170-709-8
- Cremer HW, Davies TR, Watkins SB 1965, Chemical Engineering Practice, vol. 8, 'Chemical kinetics,' Butterworths Scientific Publications, London
- Crichton R 2012, Biological inorganic chemistry: A new introduction to molecular structure and function, 2nd ed., Elsevier, Amsterdam, ISBN 978-0-444-53782-9
- Darriet B, Devalette M & Lecart B 1977, 'Determination de la structure cristalline de K_{3}AgO_{2}', Revue de chimie minérale, vol. 14, no. 5, pp. 423–428
- Dennis JK & Such TE 1993, Nickel and chromium plating, 3rd ed, Woodhead Publishing, Abington, Cambridge, ISBN 1-85573-081-2
- Darken L & Gurry R 1953, Physical chemistry of metals, international student edition, McGraw-Hill Book Company, New York
- Dávila, M. E.; Molodtsov, S. L.; Laubschat, C.; Asensio, M. C. (2002-07-19). "Structural determination of Yb single-crystal films grown on W(110) using photoelectron diffraction". Physical Review B. 66 (3): 035411–035418. Bibcode:2002PhRvB..66c5411D. doi:10.1103/PhysRevB.66.035411. ISSN 0163-1829.
- Davis JR (ed.) 1999, 'Galvanic, deposition, and stray-current deposition', Corrosion of aluminum and aluminum alloys, ASM International, Metals Park, Ohio, pp. 75–84, ISBN 0-87170-629-6
- Deiseroth H-J 2008, 'Discrete and extended metal clusters in alloys with mercury and other Group 12 elements', in M Driess & H Nöth (eds), Molecular clusters of the main group elements, Wiley-VCH, Chichester, pp. 169‒187, ISBN 978-3-527-61437-0
- Deming HG 1940, Fundamental Chemistry, John Wiley & Sons, New York
- Dillard CR & Goldberg DE 1971, Chemistry: Reactions, Structure, and Properties, Macmillan, New York
- Dirkse, TP (ed.) 1986, Copper, silver, gold and zinc, cadmium, mercury oxides and hydroxides, IUPAC solubility data series, vol. 23, Pergamon, Oxford, ISBN 0-08-032497-5
- Divakar, C.; Mohan, Murali; Singh, A. K. (1984-10-15). "The kinetics of pressure-induced fcc-bcc transformation in ytterbium". Journal of Applied Physics. 56 (8): 2337–2340. Bibcode:1984JAP....56.2337D. doi:10.1063/1.334270. ISSN 0021-8979.
- Donohue J 1982, The structures of the elements, Robert E. Krieger, Malabar, Florida, ISBN 0-89874-230-7
- Driess M & Nöth H 2004, Molecular clusters of the main group elements, Wiley-VCH, Weinheim
- Dunlap, B. D.; Brodsky, M. B.; Shenoy, G. K.; Kalvius, G. M. (1970-01-01). "Hyperfine Interactions and Anisotropic Lattice Vibrations of ^{237}Np in α-Np Metal". Physical Review B. 1 (1): 44–49. Bibcode:1970PhRvB...1...44D. doi:10.1103/PhysRevB.1.44. ISSN 0556-2805.
- Durrant PJ & Durrant B 1970, Introduction to advanced inorganic chemistry, 2nd ed., Longman
- Dwight J 1999, Aluminium design and construction, E & FN Spon, London, ISBN 0-419-15710-7
- Eagleson M 1994, Concise encyclopedia chemistry, Walter de Gruyter, Berlin, ISBN 3-11-011451-8
- Eason R 2007, Pulsed laser deposition of thin films: applications-led growth of functional materials, Wiley-Interscience, New York
- Eberle SH 1985, 'Chemical Behavior and Compounds of Astatine', pp. 183–209, in Kugler & Keller
- Emsley J 2011, Nature's Building Blocks: An A–Z guide to the Elements], new edition, Oxford University Press, Oxford, ISBN 978-0-19-960563-7
- Eranna G 2012, Metal oxide nanostructures as gas sensing devices, CRC Press, Boca Raton, Florida, ISBN 978-1-4398-6340-4
- Evans RC 1966, An introduction to crystal chemistry, 2nd (corrected) edition, Cambridge University Press, London
- Evers J 2011, 'High pressure investigations on A^{I}B^{III} Zintl compounds (A^{I} = Li to Cs; B^{III} = Al to Tl) up to 30 GPa', in TF Fässler (ed.), Zintl phases: Principles and recent developments, Springer-Verlag, Berlin, pp. 57‒96, ISBN 978-3-642-21150-8
- Farrell, H. H.; Van Siclen, C. D. (2007-07-01). "Binding energy, vapor pressure, and melting point of semiconductor nanoparticles". Journal of Vacuum Science & Technology B: Microelectronics and Nanometer Structures Processing, Measurement, and Phenomena. 25 (4): 1441–1447. Bibcode:2007JVSTB..25.1441F. doi:10.1116/1.2748415. ISSN 1071-1023.
- Fine LW 1978, Chemistry, 2nd ed., The Wilkins & Wilkins Company. Baltimore, ISBN 0-683-03210-0
- Fishcher-Bünher J 2010, 'Metallurgy of Gold' in C Corti & R Holliday (eds), Gold: Science and Applications, CRC Press, Boca Raton, pp. 123–160, ISBN 978-1-4200-6523-7
- Geffner, Saul L. (1969). "Teaching the transition elements". Journal of Chemical Education. 46 (5): 329. Bibcode:1969JChEd..46..329G. doi:10.1021/ed046p329.4. ISSN 0021-9584.
- Gerard G & King WR 1968, 'Aluminum', in CA Hampel (ed.), The encyclopedia of the chemical elements, Reinhold, New York
- Gladyshev VP & Kovaleva SV 1998, 'Liquidus shape of the mercury–gallium system', Russian Journal of Inorganic Chemistry, vol. 43, no. 9, pp. 1445–
- Glaeser WA 1992, Materials for tribology, Elsevier Science, Amsterdam, ISBN 0-444-88495-5
- Goffer Z 2007, Archaeological Chemistry, 2nd ed., John Wiley & Sons, Hoboken, New Jersey, ISBN 978-0-471-25288-7
- Goodwin F, Guruswamy S, Kainer KU, Kammer C, Knabl W, Koethe A, Leichtfreid G, Schlamp G, Stickler R & Warlimont H 2005, 'Noble metals and noble metal alloys', in Springer Handbook of Condensed Matter and Materials Data, W Martienssen & H Warlimont (eds), Springer, Berlin, pp. 329–406, ISBN 3-540-44376-2
- Gray T 2009, The elements: A visual exploration of every known atom in the universe, Black Dog & Leventhal, New York, ISBN 978-1-57912-814-2
- Gray T 2010, 'Other Metals (11)', viewed 27 September 2013
- Greenwood NN & Earnshaw A 1998, Chemistry of the elements, 2nd ed., Butterworth-Heinemann, ISBN 0-7506-3365-4
- Gupta CK 2002, Chemical metallurgy: Principles and practice, Wiley-VCH, Weinheim, ISBN 3-527-30376-6
- Gupta U 2010, Design and characterization of post-transition, main-group, heteroatomic clusters using mass spectrometry, anion photoelectron spectroscopy and velocity map imaging, PhD dissertation, Pennsylvania State University
- Habashi, Fathi (2010). "Metals: typical and less typical, transition and inner transition". Foundations of Chemistry. 12 (1): 31–39. doi:10.1007/s10698-009-9069-6. ISSN 1386-4238.
- Halford GR 2006, Fatigue and durability of structural materials, ASM International, Materials Park, Ohio, ISBN 0-87170-825-6
- Haller, E.E. (2006). "Germanium: From its discovery to SiGe devices" (PDF). Materials Science in Semiconductor Processing. 9 (4–5): 408–422. doi:10.1016/j.mssp.2006.08.063.
- Harding C, Johnson DA & Janes R 2002, Elements of the p Block, Royal Society of Chemistry, Cambridge, ISBN 0-85404-690-9
- Harrington RH 1946, The modern metallurgy of alloys, John Wiley & Sons, New York
- Häussermann, Ulrich (2008). "Coexistence of hydrogen and polyanions in multinary main group element hydrides". Zeitschrift für Kristallographie. 223 (10): 628–635. Bibcode:2008ZK....223..628H. doi:10.1524/zkri.2008.1016. ISSN 0044-2968.
- Hawkes, Stephen J. (1997). "What Is a "Heavy Metal"?". Journal of Chemical Education. 74 (11): 1374. Bibcode:1997JChEd..74.1374H. doi:10.1021/ed074p1374. ISSN 0021-9584.
- Hawkes SJ 1999, 'Polonium and Astatine are not Semimetals', Chem 13 News, February, p. 14, ISSN 0703-1157
- Hawkes, Stephen J. (2010-08-01). "Polonium and Astatine Are Not Semimetals". Journal of Chemical Education. 87 (8): 783. Bibcode:2010JChEd..87..783H. doi:10.1021/ed100308w. ISSN 0021-9584.
- Henderson M 2000, Main group chemistry, The Royal Society of Chemistry, Cambridge, ISBN 0-85404-617-8
- Hermann, Andreas; Hoffmann, Roald; Ashcroft, N. W. (2013-09-12). "Condensed Astatine: Monatomic and Metallic". Physical Review Letters. 111 (11) 116404. Bibcode:2013PhRvL.111k6404H. doi:10.1103/PhysRevLett.111.116404. ISSN 0031-9007. PMID 24074111.
- Hill G & Holman J 2000, Chemistry in context, 5th ed., Nelson Thornes, Cheltenham, ISBN 0-17-448307-4
- Hindman JC 1968, 'Neptunium', in CA Hampel (ed.), The encyclopedia of the chemical elements, Reinhold, New York, pp. 432–7
- Hinton H & Dobrota N 1978, 'Density gradient centrifugation', in TS Work & E Work (eds), Laboratory techniques in biochemistry and molecular biology, vol. 6, Elsevier/North-Holland Biomedical Press, Amsterdam, pp. 1–290, ISBN 0-7204-4200-1
- Hoffman P 2004, Semimetal surfaces, viewed 17 September 2013.
- Holl HA 1989, 'Materials for warship applications – past, present and future', in R Bufton & P Yakimiuk (eds), Past, present and future engineering in the Royal Navy, the Institute of Marine Engineers centenary year conference proceedings, RNEC Manadon, Plymouth, 6‒8 September 1989, Marine Management (Holdings) for the Institute of Marine Engineers, London, pp. 87–96, ISBN 0-907206-28-X
- Holman J & Stone P 2001, Chemistry, 2nd ed., Nelson Thornes, Walton on Thames, ISBN 0-7487-6239-6
- Holt, Rinehart & Wilson c. 2007 'Why Polonium and Astatine are not Metalloids in HRW texts', viewed 14 October 2014
- Howe, HE 1968, 'Bismuth' in CA Hampel (ed.), The encyclopedia of the chemical elements, Reinhold, New York, pp. 56–65
- Howe, HE 1968a, 'Thallium' in CA Hampel (ed.), The encyclopedia of the chemical elements, Reinhold, New York, pp. 706–711
- Huheey, James E.; Huheey, Caroline L. (1972). "Anomalous properties of elements that follow "long periods" of elements". Journal of Chemical Education. 49 (4): 227-230. Bibcode:1972JChEd..49..227H. doi:10.1021/ed049p227. ISSN 0021-9584.
- Huheey JE, Keiter EA & Keiter RL 1993, Principles of Structure & Reactivity, 4th ed., HarperCollins College Publishers, ISBN 0-06-042995-X
- Hurd MK 1965, Formwork for concrete, 7th ed, American Concrete Institute, Farmington Hills, Michigan, ISBN 0-87031-177-8
- Hutchinson E 1964, Chemistry: The elements and their reactions, 2nd ed., W B Saunders Company, Philadelphia
- IUPAC 2005, Nomenclature of inorganic chemistry (the "Red Book"), NG Connelly & T Damhus eds, RSC Publishing, Cambridge, ISBN 0-85404-438-8
- IUPAC 2006–, Compendium of chemical terminology (the "Gold Book"), 2nd ed., by M Nic, J Jirat & B Kosata, with updates compiled by A Jenkins, ISBN 0-9678550-9-8, doi:10.1351/goldbook
- Ivanov-Emin BN, Nisel'son LA & Greksa, Y 1960, 'Solubility of indium hydroxide in solution of sodium hydroxide', Russian Journal of Inorganic Chemistry, vol. 5, pp. 1996–8, in Sheets, William C.; Mugnier, Emmanuelle; Barnabé, Antoine; Marks, Tobin J.; Poeppelmeier, Kenneth R. (2006-01-01). "Hydrothermal Synthesis of Delafossite-Type Oxides" (PDF). Chemistry of Materials. 18 (1): 7–20. Bibcode:2006ChMat..18....7S. doi:10.1021/cm051791c. ISSN 0897-4756.
- Jensen, William B. (2003). "The Place of Zinc, Cadmium, and Mercury in the Periodic Table". Journal of Chemical Education. 80 (8): 952-961. Bibcode:2003JChEd..80..952J. doi:10.1021/ed080p952. ISSN 0021-9584.
- Jensen, William B. (2008). "Is Mercury Now a Transition Element?". Journal of Chemical Education. 85 (9): 1182-1183. Bibcode:2008JChEd..85.1182J. doi:10.1021/ed085p1182. ISSN 0021-9584.
- Jezequel, G.; Thomas, J.; Pollini, I. (1997-09-15). "Experimental band structure of semimetal bismuth". Physical Review B. 56 (11): 6620–6626. Bibcode:1997PhRvB..56.6620J. doi:10.1103/PhysRevB.56.6620. ISSN 0163-1829.
- Johansen G & Mackintosh AR 1970, 'Electronic structure and phase transitions in ytterbium', Solid State Communications, vol. 8, no. 2, pp. 121–4
- Johnson, O. (1970). "Role of f electrons in chemical binding". Journal of Chemical Education. 47 (6): 431-432. Bibcode:1970JChEd..47..431J. doi:10.1021/ed047p431. ISSN 0021-9584.
- Jones BW 2010, Pluto: Sentinel of the Outer Solar System, Cambridge University, Cambridge, ISBN 978-0-521-19436-5
- Joshua SJ 1991, Symmetry principles and magnetic symmetry in solid state physics, Andrew Hilger, Bristol, ISBN 0-7503-0070-1
- Karpov, Andrey; Konuma, Mitsuharu; Jansen, Martin (2006). "An experimental proof for negative oxidation states of platinum: ESCA-measurements on barium platinides". Chemical Communications (8): 838–840. doi:10.1039/b514631c. ISSN 1359-7345. PMID 16479284.
- Kauzlarich SM 2005, 'Zintl compounds' in RB King (ed.), Encyclopedia of inorganic chemistry, vol. 8, John Wiley & Sons, Chichester, pp. 6006–14, ISBN 978-0-470-86078-6
- Kauzlarich SM, Payne AC & Webb DJ 2002, 'Magnetism and magnetotransport properties of transition metal zintl isotypes', in JS Miller & M Drillon (eds), Magnetism: Molecules to Materials III, Wiley-VCH, Weinheim, pp. 37–62, ISBN 3-527-30302-2
- Kent A 1993, Experimental low temperature physics, American Institute of Physics, New York, ISBN 1-56396-030-3
- King RB 1995, Chemistry of the main group elements, VCH Publishers, New York, ISBN 1-56081-679-1
- King RB 1997, 'Applications of topology and graph theory in understanding inorganic molecules', in AT Babalan (ed), From chemical topology to three-dimensional geometry, Kluwer Academic / Plenum Publishers, New York, ISBN 978-0-30645-462-2, pp. 343–414
- King RB 2004, 'The metallurgist's periodic table and the Zintl-Klemm concept', in DH Rouvray DH & RB King (eds), The periodic table: into the 21st century, Institute of Physics Publishing, Philadelphia, ISBN 978-0-86380-292-8, pp. 189–206.
- King RB & Schleyer R 2004, 'Theory and concepts in main-group cluster chemistry', in M Driess and H Nöth (eds), Molecular clusters of the main group elements, Wiley-VCH, Chichester, pp. 1–33, ISBN 978-3-527-61437-0
- Klassen, H.; Hoppe, R. (1982). "Alkalioxoargentate(I). Über Na_{3}AgO_{2}". Zeitschrift für anorganische und allgemeine Chemie. 485 (1): 92–100. Bibcode:1982ZAACh.485...92K. doi:10.1002/zaac.19824850109. ISSN 0044-2313.
- Klemm W 1950, 'Einige probleme aus der physik und der chemie der halbmetalle und der metametalle', Angewandte Chemie, vol. 62, no. 6, pp. 133–42
- Kneen WR, Rogers MJW & Simpson P 1972, Chemistry: Facts, Patterns, and Principles, Addison-Wesley, London, ISBN 0-201-03779-3
- Kneip R 1996, 'Eduard Zintl: His life and scholarly work' in SM Kauzlarich (ed.), Chemistry, structure and bonding of zintl phases and ions, VCH, New York, pp. xvi–xxx, ISBN 1-56081-900-6
- Köhler, Jürgen; Whangbo, Myung-Hwan (2008-04-01). "Electronic Structure Study of the [Ag−Ag]^{4−}, [Au−Au]^{4−}, and [Hg−Hg]^{2−} Zintl Anions in the Intermetallic Compounds Yb_{3}Ag_{2}, Ca_{5}Au_{4}, and Ca_{3}Hg_{2}: Transition Metal Anions As p-Metal Elements". Chemistry of Materials. 20 (8): 2751–2756. doi:10.1021/cm703590d. ISSN 0897-4756.
- Kugler HK & Keller C (eds) 1985, Gmelin Handbook of Inorganic and Organometallic chemistry, 8th ed., 'At, Astatine', system no. 8a, Springer-Verlag, Berlin, ISBN 3-540-93516-9
- Larson P, Mahanti SD, Salvador J & Kanatzidis MG 2006, 'Electronic Structure of the Ternary Zintl-phase Compounds Zr3Ni3Sb4, Hf3Ni3Sb4, and Zr3Pt3Sb4 and Their Similarity to Half-Heusler Compounds Such as ZrNiSn', Physical Review B, vol. 74, pp. 035111–1–035111-8
- Legut, Dominik; Friák, Martin; Šob, Mojmír (2010-06-22). "Phase stability, elasticity, and theoretical strength of polonium from first principles". Physical Review B. 81 (21) 214118. Bibcode:2010PhRvB..81u4118L. doi:10.1103/PhysRevB.81.214118. ISSN 1098-0121.
- Leman JT & Barron AR 2005, 'Indium: Inorganic chemistry', Encyclopedia of Inorganic Chemistry, RB King (ed.), 2nd ed., Wiley, pp. 1526–1531
- Liang SC, King RA & White CET 1968, 'Indium', in CA Hampel (ed.), The encyclopedia of the chemical elements, Reinhold, New York, pp. 283–290
- Lidin RA 1996, Inorganic substances handbook, begell house, New York, ISBN 1-56700-065-7
- Liptrot FJ 2001, 'Overhead lines', in HM Ryan (ed.), High voltage electrical engineering and testing, 2nd ed., The Institute of Electrical Engineers, London, pp. 167‒211, ISBN 0-85296-775-6
- Lister, T 1998, Industrial chemistry case studies: Industrial processes in the 1990s, The Royal Society of Chemistry, London, ISBN 0-85404-925-8
- Liu H, Knowles CR & Chang LLY 1995, 'Extent of solid solution in Pb-Sn and Sb-Bi chalcogenides', The Canadian Mineralogist, vol.33, pp. 115–128
- Louis H 1911, Metallurgy of tin, McGraw-Hill Book Company, New York
- Lyons A 2007, Materials for architects & builders, 3rd ed., Elsevier, Oxford, ISBN 978-0-7506-6940-5
- Mackay KM & Mackay RA 1989, Introduction to modern inorganic chemistry, 4th ed., Blackie, Glasgow, ISBN 0-7487-6420-8
- Mason, Joan (1988). "Periodic contractions among the elements: Or, on being the right size". Journal of Chemical Education. 65 (1): 17-20. Bibcode:1988JChEd..65...17M. doi:10.1021/ed065p17. ISSN 0021-9584.
- Massalski TB (ed.) 1986, Noble metal alloys: phase diagrams, alloy phase stability, thermodynamic aspects, properties and special features, proceedings of the TMS Alloy Phase Committee, the TMS Thermodynamics Committee, and the American Society for Metals Alloy Phase Diagram Data Committee, held at the Metallurgical Society of AIME Annual Meeting, February 24‒28, 1985, The Society, Warrendale, Portland, ISBN 978-0-87339-011-8
- Massey AG 2000, Main group chemistry, 2nd ed, John Wiley & Sons, Chichester, ISBN 0-471-49037-7
- Masterton W, Hurley C & Neth E 2011, Chemistry: Principles and Reactions, 7th ed., Brooks/Cole, Belmont, California, ISBN 1-111-42710-0
- McQuarrie DA, Rock PA & Gallogly EB 2010, 'Interchapter 1: The main group metals', General chemistry, 4th ed., University Science Books, Mill Valley, California, ISBN 978-1-891389-60-3
- Merinis J, Legoux G & Bouissières G 1972, "Etude de la formation en phase gazeuse de composés interhalogénés d'astate par thermochromatographie" [Study of the gas-phase formation of interhalogen compounds of astatine by thermochromatography], Radiochemical and Radioanalytical Letters (in French), vol. 11, no. 1, pp. 59–64
- Messler RW 2011, Integral mechanical attachment: A resurgence of the oldest method of joining, Elsevier, Burlington, Massachusetts, ISBN 978-0-7506-7965-7
- Messler RW & Messler RW Jr 2011, The Essence of Materials for Engineers, Jones & Bartlett Learning, Sudbury, Massachusetts, ISBN 0-7637-7833-8
- Miller GJ, Lee C & Choe W 2002, 'Structure and bonding around the Zintl border', in G Meyer, D Naumann & L Wesermann (eds), Inorganic chemistry highlights, Wiley-VCH, Weinheim, pp. 21–53, ISBN 3-527-30265-4
- Miller GJ, Schmidt MW, Wang F & You T-S 2011, 'Quantitative Advances in the Zintl-Klemm Formalism,' in TF Fässler (ed), Zintl Phases: Principles and Recent Developments, Springer-Verlag, Berlin, pp. 1 56, ISBN 978-3-642-21149-2
- Mingos DMP 1998, Essential trends in inorganic chemistry, Oxford University Press, Oxford, ISBN 978-0198501084
- Mittemeijer EJ 2010, Fundamentals of materials science: The microstructure–property relationship using metals as model systems, Springer-Verlag, Berlin, ISBN 978-3-642-10499-2
- Moeller T 1952, Inorganic chemistry: An advanced textbook, John Wiley & Sons, New York
- Moody B 1991, Comparative Inorganic Chemistry, 3rd ed., Edward Arnold, London, ISBN 0-7131-3679-0
- Müller M 1992, Inorganic structural chemistry, 2nd ed., John Wiley & Sons, Chichester, ISBN 0-471-93717-7
- Murray J 1809, A system of chemistry, 2nd ed., vol. 3, Longman, Hurst, Rees and Orme; and John Murray, London
- Noble IG 1985, 'Structural fire protection of cargo ships and guidance on the requirements of the Merchant Shipping (Fire Protection) Regulations 1984', discussion, in Ship fires in the 1980s, Tuesday 3 and Wednesday 4 December 1985 at the Institute of Marine Engineers, pp. 20–22, Marine Management (Holdings), London, c1986, ISBN 0-907206-15-8
- Norman NC 1997, Periodicity and the s- and p-block elements, Oxford University, Oxford, ISBN 0-19-855961-5
- Ogata, Shigenobu; Li, Ju; Yip, Sidney (2002-10-25). "Ideal Pure Shear Strength of Aluminum and Copper" (PDF). Science. 298 (5594): 807–811. Bibcode:2002Sci...298..807O. doi:10.1126/science.1076652. ISSN 0036-8075. PMID 12399585.
- Oxford English Dictionary 1989, 2nd ed., Oxford University, Oxford, ISBN 0-19-861213-3
- Parish RV 1977, The metallic elements, Longman, London, ISBN 0-582-44278-8
- Pashaey, B. P.; Seleznev, V. V. (1973). "Magnetic susceptibility of gallium-indium alloys in liquid state". Soviet Physics Journal. 16 (4): 565–566. Bibcode:1973SvPhJ..16..565P. doi:10.1007/BF00890855. ISSN 0038-5697.
- Patnaik, P 2003, Handbook of inorganic chemicals, McGraw-Hill, New York, ISBN 978-0-07-049439-8
- Pauling L 1988, General chemistry, Dover Publications, New York, ISBN 0-486-65622-5
- Petrii OA 2012, 'Chemistry, electrochemistry and electrochemical applications', in J Garche, C Dyer, P Moseley, Z Ogumi, D Rand & B Scrosati (eds), Encyclopedia of electrochemica power sources, Elsevier B.V., Amsterdam, ISBN 978-0-444-52093-7
- Phillips CSG & Williams RJP 1965, Inorganic chemistry, II: Metals, Clarendon Press, Oxford
- Pimpentel GC & Spratley RD 1971, Understanding chemistry, Holden-Day, San Francisco
- Polmear I 2006, Light alloys: From traditional alloys to nanocrystals, 4th ed., Elsevier, Oxford, ISBN 0-7506-6371-5
- Poole CP 2004, Encyclopedic dictionary of condensed matter physics, vol. 1 A–M, trans. from Translated from the original Russian ed., published National Academy of Sciences of Ukraine, 1996–1998, Elsevier, Amsterdam, ISBN 0-12-088398-8
- Pruszyński, M.; Bilewicz, A.; Wąs, B.; Petelenz, B. (2006). "Formation and stability of astatide-mercury complexes". Journal of Radioanalytical and Nuclear Chemistry. 268 (1): 91–94. Bibcode:2006JRNC..268...91P. doi:10.1007/s10967-006-0129-2. ISSN 0236-5731.
- Ramroth WT 2006, Thermo-mechanical structural modelling of FRP composite sandwich panels exposed to fire, PhD thesis, University of California, San Diego, ISBN 978-0-542-85617-4
- Rankin WJ 2011, Minerals, metals and sustainability: Meeting future material needs, CSIRO Publishing, Collingwood, ISBN 978-0-643-09726-1
- Rayner-Canham G & Overton T 2006, Descriptive inorganic chemistry, 4th ed., WH Freeman, New York, ISBN 0-7167-8963-9
- Reid D, Groves G, Price C & Tennant I 2011, Science for the New Zealand curriculum Year 11, Cambridge University, Cambridge, ISBN 978-0-521-18618-6
- Reith F & Shuster J 2018, Geomicrobiology and biogeochemistry of precious metals, MDPI, Basel
- Roget's 21st Century Thesaurus, 3rd ed, Philip Lief Group
- Roher GS 2001, Structure and bonding in crystalline materials, Cambridge University Press, Cambridge, ISBN 0-521-66379-2
- Roscoe HE & Schorlemmer FRS 1894, A treatise on chemistry: Volume II: The metals, D Appleton, New York
- Roza G 2009, Bromine, Rosen Publishing, New York, ISBN 1-4358-5068-8
- Russell AM & Lee KL 2005, Structure-property relations in nonferrous metals, Wiley-Interscience, New York, ISBN 0-471-64952-X
- Ryan W (ed.) 1968, Non-ferrous Extractive Metallurgy in the United Kingdom, Institution of Mining and Metallurgy, London
- Samsonov GV 1968, Handbook of the physiochemical properties of the elements, I F I/Plenum, New York
- Sargent-Welch VWR International 2008, Chart of the elements: With electron distribution, Buffalo Grove, Illinois
- Savitsky EM 1961, The influence of temperature on the mechanical properties of metals and alloys, Stanford University Press, Stanford
- Sazhin NP 1961, 'Development of the metallurgy of the rare and minor metals in the USSR,' in IP Bardin (ed.), Metallurgy of the USSR, 1917-1957, volume 1, originally published by Metallurgizdat, State Scientific and Technical Publishing House of Literature on Ferrous and Nonferrous Metallurgy, Moscow, 1958; published for the National Science Foundation, Washington, DC and the Department of the Interior, USA by the Israel Program for Scientific Translations, Jerusalem, p.p. 744–64
- Schumann W 2008, Minerals of the World, 2nd ed., trans. by EE Reinersman, Sterling Publishing, New York, ISBN 978-1-4027-5339-8
- Schwartz M 2010, Encyclopedia and handbook of materials, parts and finishes, 2nd ed., CRC Press, Boca Raton, Florida, ISBN 1-56676-661-3
- Schweitzer PA 2003, Metallic materials: Physical, mechanical, and corrosion properties, Marcel Dekker, New York, ISBN 0-8247-0878-4
- Schwietzer GK & Pesterfield LL 2010, The aqueous chemistry of the elements, Oxford University, Oxford, ISBN 0-19-539335-X
- "Deming, Horace G. Fundamental Chemistry. New York: John Wiley and Sons, Inc., 1947. 745 p. $4.00". Science Education. 32 (2): 120. 1948. Bibcode:1948SciEd..32R.120.. doi:10.1002/sce.3730320231. ISSN 0036-8326.
- Scott EC & Kanda FA 1962, The nature of atoms and molecules: A general chemistry, Harper & Row, New York
- Sequeira CAC 2013, 'Diffusion coatings for the oil industry', in R Javaherdashti, C Nwaoha, H Tan (eds), Corrosion and materials in the oil and gas industries, RC Press, Boca Raton
- Sevov, Slavi C.; Ostenson, Jerome E.; Corbett, John D. (1993). "K_{8}In_{10}Hg: a Zintl phase with isolated In_{10}Hg clusters". Journal of Alloys and Compounds. 202 (1–2): 289–294. doi:10.1016/0925-8388(93)90551-W.
- Sidgwick NV 1937, The electronic theory of valence, Oxford University Press, London
- Sidgwick NV 1950, The Chemical Elements and Their Compounds: Volume I, Clarendon Press, Oxford
- Silberberg MS 2006, Chemistry: The Molecular Nature of Matter and Change, 4th ed., McGraw-Hill, New York, ISBN 0-07-111658-3
- Slabon, Adam; Budnyk, Serhiy; Cuervo-Reyes, Eduardo; Wörle, Michael; Mensing, Christian; Nesper, Reinhard (2012-11-12). "Copper Silicides with the Highest Lithium Content: Li_{7}CuSi_{2} Containing the 16-Electron Group [CuSi_{2}]^{7−} and Li_{7.3}CuSi_{3} with Heterographene Nets^{2}_{∞}[CuSi]^{3.3−}". Angewandte Chemie International Edition. 51 (46): 11594–11596. doi:10.1002/anie.201203504. ISSN 1433-7851. PMID 23055327.
- Slater JC 1939, Introduction to chemical physics, McGraw-Hill Book Company, New York
- Smith DW 1990, Inorganic substances: A prelude to the study of descriptive inorganic chemistry, Cambridge University, Cambridge, ISBN 0-521-33738-0
- Sofin, M.; Friese, K.; Nuss, J.; Peters, E. M.; Jansen, M. (2002). "Synthesis and Crystal Structure of Rb_{3}AgO_{2}". Zeitschrift für anorganische und allgemeine Chemie (in German). 628 (11): 2500–2504. doi:10.1002/1521-3749(200211)628:11<2500::AID-ZAAC2500>3.0.CO;2-L. ISSN 0044-2313.
- Solov'eva VD, Svirchevskaya EG, Bobrova VV & El'tsov NM 1973, 'Solubility of copper, cadmium, and indium oxides in sodium hydroxide solutions', Trudy Instittua Metallurgii i Obogashcheniya, Akademiya Nauk Kazakhskoi SSR (Transactions of the Institute of Metallurgy and Ore Dressing, Academy of Sciences of the Kazakh SSR) vol. 49, pp. 37–44
- Sorensen EMB 1991, Metal poisoning in fish, CRC Press, Boca Raton, Florida, ISBN 0-8493-4268-6
- Steele D 1966, The chemistry of the metallic elements, Pergamon Press, Oxford
- Steiner LE & Campbell JA 1955, General Chemistry, The Macmillan Company, New York
- Steiner LE & Campbell JA 1955, General Chemistry, The Macmillan Company, New York
- Strathern P 2000, Mendeleyev's dream: The quest for the elements, Hamish Hamilton, London, ISBN 0-241-14065-X
- Subba Rao GV & Shafer MW 1986, 'Intercalation in layered transition metal dichalcogenides', in F Lévy (ed), Intercalated Layered Materials, D Reidel, Dordrecht, ISBN 90-277-0967-X, pp. 99–200
- Takahashi, N.; Otozai, K. (1986). "The mechanism of the reaction of elementary astatine with organic solvents". Journal of Radioanalytical and Nuclear Chemistry Letters. 103 (1): 1–9. Bibcode:1986JRNC..103....1T. doi:10.1007/BF02165358. ISSN 0236-5731.
- Takahashi N, Yano D & Baba H 1992, "Chemical behavior of astatine molecules", Proceedings of the international conference on evolution in beam applications, Takasaki, Japan, November 5‒8, 1991, pp. 536‒539
- Taylor MJ & Brothers PJ 1993, 'Inorganic derivatives of the elements', in AJ Downs (ed.), Chemistry of aluminium, gallium, indium and thallium, Chapman & Hall, London, ISBN 0-7514-0103-X
- Taylor N, Derbogosian M, Ng W, Stubbs A, Stokes R, Bowen S, Raphael S & Moloney J 2007, Study on chemistry 1, John Wiley & Sons, Milton, Queensland, ISBN 978-0-7314-0418-6
- Temkin ON 2012, Homogeneous Catalysis with Metal Complexes: Kinetic Aspects and Mechanisms, John Wiley & Sons, Chichester, ISBN 978-0-470-66699-9
- Thayer JS 2010, 'Relativistic effects and the chemistry of the heavier main-group elements,' in Relativistic methods for chemists, M Barysz & Y Ishikawa (eds), pp. 63–98, Springer Science+Business Media B. V., Dordrecht, ISBN 978-1-4020-9974-8
- Tóth I & Győri B 2005, 'Thallium: Inorganic chemistry', Encyclopedia of Inorganic Chemistry, RB King (ed.), 2nd ed., John Wiley & Sons, New York, ISBN 0-471-93620-0 (set)
- US Department of Transportation, Maritime Administration 1987, Marine fire prevention, firefighting and fire safety, Washington DC
- Vanderah TA 1992, Chemistry of Superconductor Materials: Preparation, Chemistry, Characterization, and Theory, Noyes Publications, New Jersey, ISBN 0-8155-1279-1
- Van Loon JC & Barefoot RR 1991, Determination of the precious metals: Selected instrumental methods, John Wiley & Sons, Chichester
- Van Wert LR 1936, An introduction to physical metallurgy, McGraw-Hill Book Company, New York
- Vargel C 2004, Corrosion of aluminium, Elsevier, Amsterdam, ISBN 0-08-044495-4
- Vernon, René E. (2020). "Organising the metals and nonmetals". Foundations of Chemistry. 22 (2): 217–233. doi:10.1007/s10698-020-09356-6. ISSN 1386-4238.
- Walker JD, Enache M & Newman MC 2013, Fundamental QSARS for metal ions, CRC Press, Boca Raton, Florida, ISBN 978-1-4200-8433-7
- Wanamaker E & Pennington HR 1921, Electric arc welding, Simmons-Boardman, New York
- Wells AF 1985, Structural inorganic chemistry, 5th ed., Clarendon, Oxford, ISBN 0-19-855370-6
- Whitten KW, Davis RE, Peck LM & Stanley GG 2014, Chemistry, 10th ed., Thomson Brooks/Cole, Belmont, California, ISBN 1-133-61066-8
- Wiberg N 2001, Inorganic chemistry, Academic Press, San Diego, ISBN 0-12-352651-5
- Xia, Sheng-qing; Bobev, Svilen (2006-09-01). "Ba_{11}Cd_{8}Bi_{14}: Bismuth Zigzag Chains in a Ternary Alkaline-Earth Transition-Metal Zintl Phase". Inorganic Chemistry. 45 (18): 7126–7132. doi:10.1021/ic060583z. ISSN 0020-1669. PMID 16933913.
- Young, J. A.; Malik, J. G.; Quagliano, J. V.; Danehy, J. P. (1969). "Chemical queries. Especially for introductory chemistry teachers: Do elements in the zinc subgroup belong to the transition series?". Journal of Chemical Education. 46 (4): 227‒229. doi:10.1021/ed046p227 (inactive 13 January 2026).
- Zubieta JA & Zuckerman JJ 2009, 'Structural tin chemistry', in SJ Lippard (ed.), Progress in inorganic chemistry, vol. 24, pp. 251–476 (260), ISBN 978-0-470-16675-8
- Zuckerman JJ & Hagen AP 1989, Inorganic Reactions and Methods, the Formation of Bonds to Halogens, John Wiley & Sons, New York, ISBN 978-0-471-18656-4
