= Periodic trends =

Specific recurring patterns that are present in the modern periodic table

The periodic trends in properties of elements.

In chemistry, periodic trends are specific patterns present in the periodic table that illustrate different aspects of certain elements when grouped by period and/or group. They were discovered by the Russian chemist Dmitri Mendeleev in 1863. Major periodic trends include atomic radius, ionization energy, electron affinity, electronegativity, nucleophilicity, electrophilicity, valency, nuclear charge, and metallic character. Mendeleev built the foundation of the periodic table. Mendeleev organized the elements based on atomic weight, leaving empty spaces where he believed undiscovered elements would take their places. Mendeleev's discovery of this trend allowed him to predict the existence and properties of three unknown elements, which were later discovered by other chemists and named gallium, scandium, and germanium. English physicist Henry Moseley discovered that organizing the elements by atomic number instead of atomic weight would naturally group elements with similar properties.

== Summary of trends ==
Periodic property	Across the period	Down the group
Atomic radius	Decreases	Increases
Nucleophilicity	Decreases	Increases
Metallic character	Decreases	Increases
Nuclear charge	Increases	Increases
Effective nuclear charge	Increases	Decreases
Ionization energy	Increases	Decreases
Electron affinity	Increases	Decreases
Electronegativity	Increases	Decreases
Nonmetallic character	Increases	Decreases
Valence electrons	Increases	Constant
Valency	Increases (groups 1–14)	Constant
Valency	Decreases (groups 15–18)	Constant

== Atomic radius ==
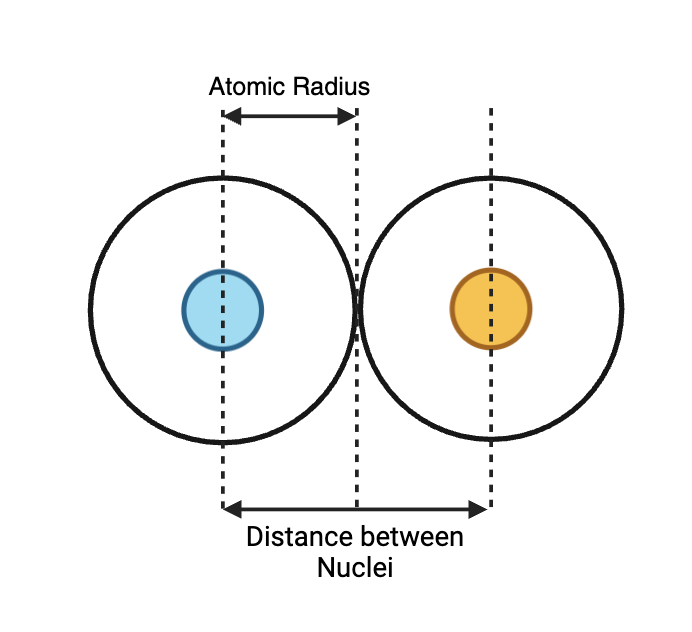
The atomic radius is half of the distance between two nuclei of two atoms.

The atomic radius is the distance from the atomic nucleus to the outermost electron orbital in an atom. In general, the atomic radius decreases as we move from left-to-right in a period, and it increases when we go down a group. This is because in periods, the valence electrons are in the same outermost shell. The atomic number increases within the same period while moving from left to right, which in turn increases the effective nuclear charge. The increase in attractive forces reduces the atomic radius of elements. When we move down the group, the atomic radius increases due to the addition of a new shell.

== Nuclear charge and effective nuclear charge ==
Nuclear charge is defined as the number of protons in the nucleus of an element. Thus, from left-to-right of a period and top-to-bottom of a group, as the number of protons in the nucleus increases, the nuclear charge will also increase. However, electrons of multi-electron atoms do not experience the entire nuclear charge due to shielding effects from the other electrons. In this case, the nuclear charge of atoms that experience this shielding is referred to as effective nuclear charge. Shielding increases as the number of an atom's inner shells increases. So from left-to-right of a period, the effective nuclear charge will still increase. But, from top-to-bottom of a group, as the number of shells increases, the effective nuclear charge will decrease.

== Ionization energy ==
The ionization energy is the minimum amount of energy that an electron in a gaseous atom or ion has to absorb to come out of the influence of the attracting force of the nucleus. It is also referred to as ionization potential. The first ionization energy is the amount of energy that is required to remove the first electron from a neutral atom. The energy needed to remove the second electron from the neutral atom is called the second ionization energy and so on.

As one moves from left-to-right across a period in the modern periodic table, the ionization energy increases as the nuclear charge increases and the atomic size decreases. The decrease in the atomic size results in a more potent force of attraction between the electrons and the nucleus. However, suppose one moves down in a group. In that case, the ionization energy decreases as atomic size increases due to adding a valence shell, thereby diminishing the nucleus's attraction to electrons.

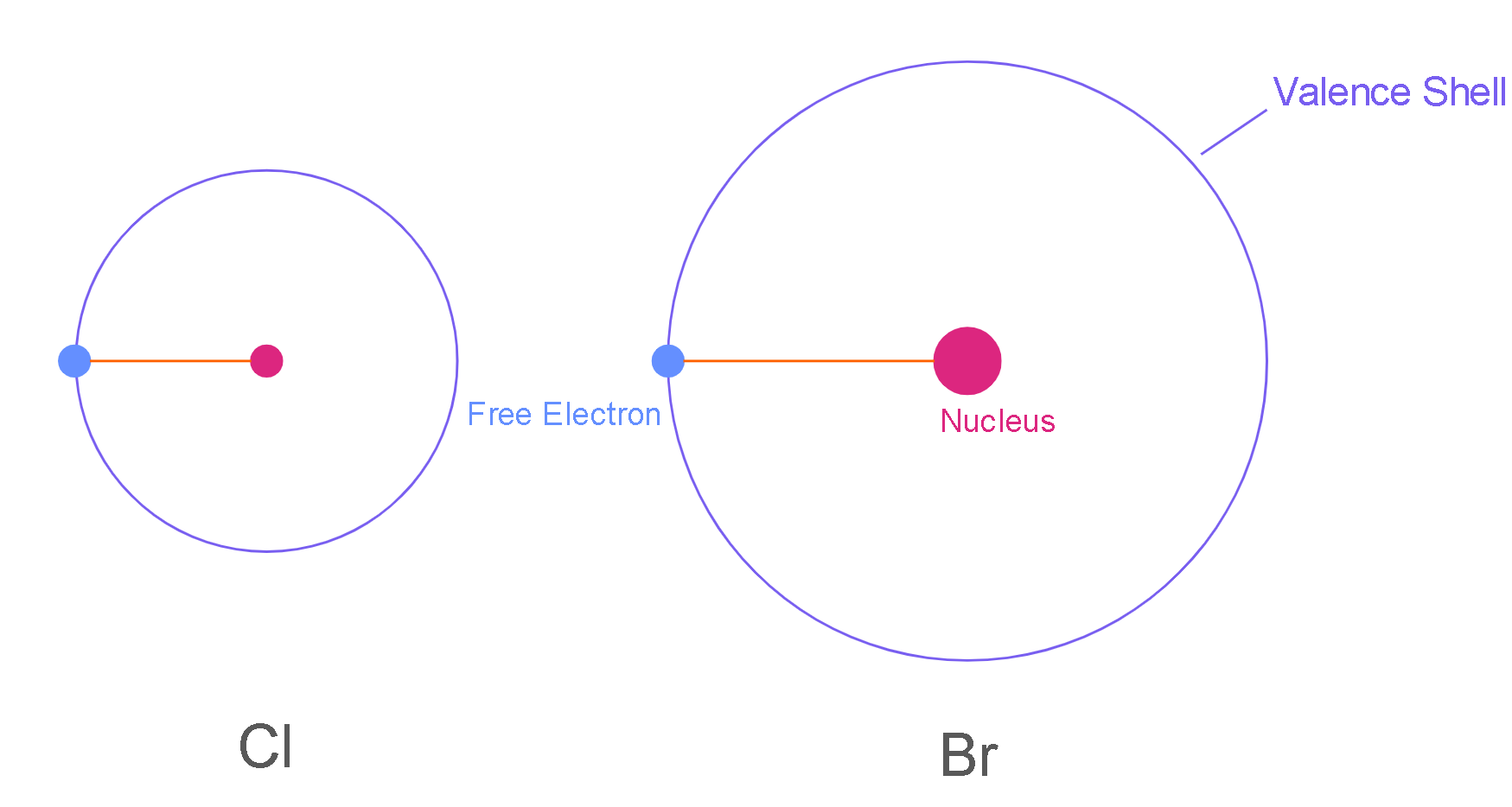
Ionization energy and electron affinity between two electronegative atoms (i.e., Chlorine and Bromine) decreases as the space between the valence shell and nucleus increases.

== Electron affinity ==
The energy released when an electron is added to a neutral gaseous atom to form an anion is known as electron affinity. Trend-wise, as one progresses from left to right across a period, the electron affinity will increase as the nuclear charge increases and the atomic size decreases resulting in a more potent force of attraction of the nucleus and the added electron. However, as one moves down in a group, electron affinity decreases because atomic size increases due to the addition of a valence shell, thereby weakening the nucleus's attraction to electrons. Although it may seem that fluorine should have the greatest electron affinity, its small size generates enough repulsion among the electrons, resulting in chlorine having the highest electron affinity in the halogen family.

== Electronegativity ==
Periodic variation of Pauling electronegativities

The tendency of an atom in a molecule to attract the shared pair of electrons towards itself is known as electronegativity. It is a dimensionless quantity because it is only a tendency. The most commonly used scale to measure electronegativity was designed by Linus Pauling. The scale has been named the Pauling scale in his honour. According to this scale, fluorine is the most electronegative element, while cesium is the least electronegative element.

Trend-wise, as one moves from left to right across a period in the modern periodic table, the electronegativity increases as the nuclear charge increases and the atomic size decreases. However, if one moves down in a group, the electronegativity decreases as atomic size increases due to the addition of a valence shell, thereby decreasing the atom's attraction to electrons.

However, in group XIII (boron family), the electronegativity first decreases from boron to aluminium and then increases down the group. It is due to the fact that the atomic size increases as we move down the group, but at the same time the effective nuclear charge increases due to poor shielding of the inner d and f electrons. As a result, the force of attraction of the nucleus for the electrons increases and hence the electronegativity increases from aluminium to thallium.

== Valency ==
The valency of an element is the number of electrons that must be lost or gained by an atom to obtain a stable electron configuration. In simple terms, it is the measure of the combining capacity of an element to form chemical compounds. Electrons found in the outermost shell are generally known as valence electrons; the number of valence electrons determines the valency of an atom.

Trend-wise, while moving from left to right across a period, the number of valence electrons of elements increases and varies between one and eight. But the valency of elements first increases from 1 to 4, and then it decreases to 0 as we reach the noble gases. However, as we move down in a group, the number of valence electrons generally does not change. Hence, in many cases the elements of a particular group have the same valency. However, this periodic trend is not always followed for heavier elements, especially for the f-block and the transition metals. These elements show variable valency as these elements have a d-orbital as the penultimate orbital and an s-orbital as the outermost orbital. The energies of these (n-1)d and ns orbitals (e.g., 4d and 5s) are relatively close.

== Metallic and non-metallic properties ==
Metallic properties generally increase down the groups, as decreasing attraction between the nuclei and outermost electrons causes these electrons to be more loosely bound and thus able to conduct heat and electricity. Across each period, from left to right, the increasing attraction between the nuclei and the outermost electrons causes the metallic character to decrease. In contrast, the nonmetallic character decreases down the groups and increases across the periods.

== Nucleophilicity and electrophilicity ==
Electrophilicity refers to the tendency of an electron-deficient species, called an electrophile, to accept electrons. Similarly, nucleophilicity is defined as the affinity of an electron-rich species, known as a nucleophile, to donate electrons to another species. Trends in the periodic table are useful for predicting an element's nucleophilicity and electrophilicity. In general, nucleophilicity decreases as electronegativity increases, meaning that nucleophilicity decreases from left to right across the periodic table. On the other hand, electrophilicity generally increases as electronegativity increases, meaning that electrophilicity follows an increasing trend from left to right on the periodic table. However, the specific molecular or chemical environment of the electrophile also influences electrophilicity. Therefore, electrophilicity cannot be accurately predicted based solely on periodic trends.

== See also ==
- History of the periodic table
- List of elements by atomic properties
