= D-block contraction =

Reason behind some elements' anomalous behaviour

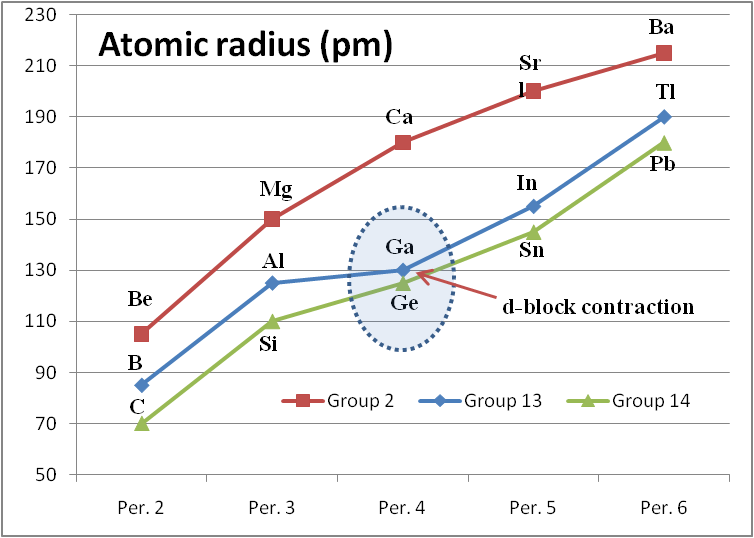
Atomic radius of elements of the groups 2, 13 and 14, showing the "d-block contraction", especially for Ga and Ge

d-Block contraction or scandide contraction refers to the consequences of a full 3d subshell on the properties of period 4 elements. The elements in question are gallium, germanium, arsenic, selenium, bromine, and krypton. Their electronic configurations include completely filled d orbitals (d^{10}). The d-block contraction is best illustrated by comparing some properties of the group 13 elements to highlight the effect on gallium.

Element	Atomic electron config.	Sum 1st – 3rd I.Ps kJ/mol	M^{3+} electron config.	M^{3+} radius (pm)
Boron, B	[He] 2s^{2} 2p^{1}	6887.4	[He]	
Aluminium, Al	[Ne] 3s^{2} 3p^{1}	5139	[Ne]	53.5
Gallium, Ga	[Ar] 3d^{10} 4s^{2} 4p^{1}	5521.1	[Ar] 3d^{10}	62
Indium, In	[Kr] 4d^{10} 5s^{2} 5p^{1}	5083	[Kr] 4d^{10}	80
Thallium, Tl	[Xe] 4f^{14} 5d^{10} 6s^{2} 6p^{1}	5438.4	[Xe] 4f^{14} 5d^{10}	88.5

Gallium can be seen to be anomalous. The most obvious effect is that the sum of the first three ionization potentials of gallium is higher than that of aluminium, whereas the trend in the group would be for it to be lower. The second table below shows the trend in the sum of the first three ionization potentials for the elements B, Al, Sc, Y, and La. Sc, Y, and La have three valence electrons above a noble gas electron core. In contrast to the group 13 elements, this sequence shows a smooth reduction.

Element	Atomic electron config.	Sum 1st – 3rd I.Ps kJ/mol	M^{3+} electron config.	M^{3+} radius (pm)
Boron, B	[He] 2s^{2} 2p^{1}	6887.4	[He]	
Aluminium, Al	[Ne] 3s^{2} 3p^{1}	5139	[Ne]	53.5
Scandium, Sc	[Ar] 3d^{1} 4s^{2}	4256.7	[Ar]	74.5
Yttrium, Y	[Kr] 4d^{1} 5s^{2}	3760	[Kr]	90
Lanthanum, La	[Xe] 5d^{1} 6s^{2}	3455.4	[Xe]	103.2

Density functional theory calculations indicate that scandide contraction should manifest itself in the ionization potentials of monovalent Group 13 compounds (“trielylenes”) and zero-valent (“tetrylones”) and divalent Group 14 (“tetrylenes”) compounds, resulting in local maxima at gallium and germanium. The inert pair effect, which owes significantly to relativistic effects, results in similar elevations of ionization potentials for thallium and lead compounds. Together, these electronic effects result in a zigzag distribution of ionization potentials down Groups 13 and 14, a phenomenon that has been described as secondary periodicity.

The best-known structural effect of scandide is the unexpectedly small ionic radius of the Ga^{3+} ion, which is almost identical to that of the Al^{3+} ion. Many examples illustrate the effect for trivalent Group 13 compounds, but the effect is also observed for monovalent aluminum and gallium.

The cause of the d-block contraction is the poor shielding of the nuclear charge by the electrons in the d orbitals. The outer valence electrons are more strongly attracted by the nucleus causing the observed increase in ionization potentials. The d-block contraction can be compared to the lanthanide contraction, which is caused by inadequate shielding of the nuclear charge by electrons occupying f orbitals.

== See also ==
- Periodic table
- Electronegativity
- Electron affinity
- Effective nuclear charge
- Electron configuration
- Exchange interaction
- Lanthanide contraction
- Actinide contraction
