= Frequency (disambiguation) =

Frequency refers to how often an event occurs within a given period.

Frequency or Frequencies may also refer to:

== Entertainment ==
- Frequency (2000 film), a film starring Dennis Quaid and Jim Caviezel
- Frequency (2019 film), a Burmese horror film
- Frequencies (film), a 2013 independent British film
- Frequency (TV series), a 2016 TV series starring Peyton List and Riley Smith
- Frequency (Nick Gilder album), 1979
- Frequency (Frequency album), 2006
- Frequency (IQ album), 2009
- Frequency (EP), a 2024 EP by WayV
- "Frequency" (Kid Cudi song), 2016
- "Frequency" (Demi Lovato song), 2025
- "Frequency", a song by Feeder from their 2005 album Pushing the Senses
- "Frequency", a song by The Jesus and Mary Chain from Honey's Dead
- "Frequency", a 1991 song by Altern-8 also featured on the album Full On... Mask Hysteria
- "Frequency (No Dormir)", a 2018 song by Lao Ra, Lully, and Throwing Shade appearing on the Gorillaz EP A Solar Collaboration
- "Frequency", a song by Super Furry Animals from their album Love Kraft
- Frequency (record producer) (born 1983), American music producer and musician
- Frequency (video game), a 2001 music video game
- Frequencies (LFO album), 1991
- Frequencies (A-F-R-O and MotionPlus album), 2026
- FreQuency, a band composed of members of FromSoftware's sound team

== Other uses ==
- Frequency (gene), a specific gene named "frequency"
- Frequency (statistics), the number of occurrences of an event
  - Frequency (marketing), a related term with respect to audience
- FM4 Frequency Festival, an Austrian music festival

== See also ==
- Aperiodic frequency
- Periodicity (disambiguation)
- Rate (disambiguation)
- Rate of change (disambiguation)
- Quefrency
