= List of elements by atomic properties =

This is a list of chemical elements and their atomic properties, ordered by atomic number (Z).

Since valence electrons are not clearly defined for the d-block and f-block elements, there not being a clear point at which further ionisation becomes unprofitable, a purely formal definition as number of electrons in the outermost shell has been used.

== Table ==
Z	Name	Symbol	Average atomic mass	Electronegativity (Pauling)	First Ionization Energy (eV)	Radii (pm)			Valence electrons
Z	Name	Symbol	Average atomic mass	Electronegativity (Pauling)	First Ionization Energy (eV)	Atomic	Van der Waals	Covalent	Valence electrons
1	Hydrogen	H	1.008	2.2	13.59844	25	120	38	1
2	Helium	He	4.002602(2)	—	24.58741	31	140	32	2
3	Lithium	Li	6.941(2)	0.98	5.39172	145	182	134	1
4	Beryllium	Be	9.012182(3)	1.57	9.3227	105	—	90	2
5	Boron	B	10.811(7)	2.04	8.29803	85	—	82	3
6	Carbon	C	12.0107(8)	2.55	11.2603	70	170	77	4
7	Nitrogen	N	14.0067(2)	3.04	14.53414	65	155	75	5
8	Oxygen	O	15.9994(3)	3.44	13.61806	60	152	73	6
9	Fluorine	F	18.9984032(5)	3.98	17.42282	50	147	71	7
10	Neon	Ne	20.1797(6)	—	21.5646	38	154	69	8
11	Sodium	Na	22.98976928(2)	0.93	5.13908	180	227	154	1
12	Magnesium	Mg	24.3050(6)	1.31	7.64624	150	173	130	2
13	Aluminium	Al	26.9815386(8)	1.61	5.98577	125	—	118	3
14	Silicon	Si	28.0855(3)	1.9	8.15169	110	210	111	4
15	Phosphorus	P	30.973762(2)	2.19	10.48669	100	180	106	5
16	Sulfur	S	32.065(5)	2.58	10.36001	100	180	102	6
17	Chlorine	Cl	35.453(2)	3.16	12.96764	100	175	99	7
18	Argon	Ar	39.948(1)	—	15.75962	71	188	97	8
19	Potassium	K	39.0983(1)	0.82	4.34066	220	275	196	1
20	Calcium	Ca	40.078(4)	1	6.11316	180	—	174	2
21	Scandium	Sc	44.955912(6)	1.36	6.5615	160	—	144	2
22	Titanium	Ti	47.867(1)	1.54	6.8281	140	—	136	2
23	Vanadium	V	50.9415(1)	1.63	6.7462	135	—	125	2
24	Chromium	Cr	51.9961(6)	1.66	6.7665	140	—	127	1
25	Manganese	Mn	54.938045(5)	1.55	7.43402	140	—	139	2
26	Iron	Fe	55.845(2)	1.83	7.9024	140	—	125	2
27	Cobalt	Co	58.933195(5)	1.91	7.6398	135	163	121	2
28	Nickel	Ni	58.6934(4)	1.88	7.881	135	—	126	2
29	Copper	Cu	63.546(3)	1.9	7.72638	135	140	138	1
30	Zinc	Zn	65.38(2)	1.65	9.3942	135	139	131	2
31	Gallium	Ga	69.723(1)	1.81	5.9993	130	187	126	3
32	Germanium	Ge	72.63(1)	2.01	7.8994	125	—	122	4
33	Arsenic	As	74.92160(2)	2.18	9.7886	115	185	119	5
34	Selenium	Se	78.96(3)	2.55	9.75238	115	190	116	6
35	Bromine	Br	79.904(1)	2.96	11.81381	115	185	114	7
36	Krypton	Kr	83.798(2)	3	13.99961	88	202	110	8
37	Rubidium	Rb	85.4678(3)	0.82	4.17713	235	—	211	1
38	Strontium	Sr	87.62(1)	0.95	5.6949	200	—	192	2
39	Yttrium	Y	88.90585(2)	1.22	6.2171	180	—	162	2
40	Zirconium	Zr	91.224(2)	1.33	6.6339	155	—	148	2
41	Niobium	Nb	92.90638(2)	1.6	6.75885	145	—	137	1
42	Molybdenum	Mo	95.96(2)	2.16	7.09243	145	—	145	1
43	Technetium	Tc	[98]	1.9	7.28	135	—	156	1
44	Ruthenium	Ru	101.07(2)	2.2	7.3605	130	—	126	1
45	Rhodium	Rh	102.90550(2)	2.28	7.4589	135	—	135	1
46	Palladium	Pd	106.42(1)	2.2	8.3369	140	163	131	
47	Silver	Ag	107.8682(2)	1.93	7.5762	160	172	153	1
48	Cadmium	Cd	112.411(8)	1.69	8.9938	155	158	148	2
49	Indium	In	114.818(3)	1.78	5.78636	155	193	144	3
50	Tin	Sn	118.710(7)	1.96	7.3439	145	217	141	4
51	Antimony	Sb	121.760(1)	2.05	8.6084	145	—	138	5
52	Tellurium	Te	127.60(3)	2.1	9.0096	140	206	135	6
53	Iodine	I	126.90447(3)	2.66	10.45126	140	198	133	7
54	Xenon	Xe	131.293(6)	2.6	12.1298	108	216	130	8
55	Caesium	Cs	132.9054519(2)	0.79	3.8939	260	—	225	1
56	Barium	Ba	137.327(7)	0.89	5.2117	215	—	198	2
57	Lanthanum	La	138.90547(7)	1.1	5.5769	195	—	169	2
58	Cerium	Ce	140.116(1)	1.12	5.5387	185	—	—	2
59	Praseodymium	Pr	140.90765(2)	1.13	5.473	185	—	—	2
60	Neodymium	Nd	144.242(3)	1.14	5.525	185	—	—	2
61	Promethium	Pm	[145]	—	5.582	185	—	—	2
62	Samarium	Sm	150.36(2)	1.17	5.6436	185	—	—	2
63	Europium	Eu	151.964(1)	—	5.6704	185	—	—	2
64	Gadolinium	Gd	157.25(3)	1.2	6.1501	180	—	—	2
65	Terbium	Tb	158.92535(2)	—	5.8638	175	—	—	2
66	Dysprosium	Dy	162.500(1)	1.22	5.9389	175	—	—	2
67	Holmium	Ho	164.93032(2)	1.23	6.0215	175	—	—	2
68	Erbium	Er	167.259(3)	1.24	6.1077	175	—	—	2
69	Thulium	Tm	168.93421(2)	1.25	6.18431	175	—	—	2
70	Ytterbium	Yb	173.054(5)	—	6.25416	175	—	—	2
71	Lutetium	Lu	174.9668(1)	1.27	5.4259	175	—	160	2
72	Hafnium	Hf	178.49(2)	1.3	6.82507	155	—	150	2
73	Tantalum	Ta	180.94788(2)	1.5	7.5496	145	—	138	2
74	Tungsten	W	183.84(1)	2.36	7.864	135	—	146	2
75	Rhenium	Re	186.207(1)	1.9	7.8335	135	—	159	2
76	Osmium	Os	190.23(3)	2.2	8.4382	130	—	128	2
77	Iridium	Ir	192.217(3)	2.2	8.967	135	—	137	2
78	Platinum	Pt	195.084(9)	2.28	8.9587	135	175	128	1
79	Gold	Au	196.966569(4)	2.54	9.2255	135	166	144	1
80	Mercury	Hg	200.59(2)	2	10.4375	150	155	149	2
81	Thallium	Tl	204.3833(2)	1.62	6.1082	190	196	148	3
82	Lead	Pb	207.2(1)	2.33	7.41666	180	202	147	4
83	Bismuth	Bi	208.98040(1)	2.02	7.2856	160	—	146	5
84	Polonium	Po	[209]	2	8.417	190	—	—	6
85	Astatine	At	[210]	2.2		—	—	—	7
86	Radon	Rn	[222]	—	10.7485	120	—	145	8
87	Francium	Fr	[223]	0.7	4.0727	—	—	—	1
88	Radium	Ra	[226]	0.9	5.2784	215	—	—	2
89	Actinium	Ac	[227]	1.1	5.17	195	—	—	2
90	Thorium	Th	232.03806(2)	1.3	6.3067	180	—	—	2
91	Protactinium	Pa	231.03588(2)	1.5	5.89	180	—	—	2
92	Uranium	U	238.02891(3)	1.38	6.19405	175	186	—	2
93	Neptunium	Np	[237]	1.36	6.2657	175	—	—	2
94	Plutonium	Pu	[244]	1.28	6.0262	175	—	—	2
95	Americium	Am	[243]	1.3	5.9738	175	—	—	2
96	Curium	Cm	[247]	1.3	5.9915				2
97	Berkelium	Bk	[247]	1.3	6.1979				2
98	Californium	Cf	[251]	1.3	6.2817				2
99	Einsteinium	Es	[252]	1.3	6.42				2
100	Fermium	Fm	[257]	1.3	6.5				2
101	Mendelevium	Md	[258]	1.3	6.58				2
102	Nobelium	No	[259]	1.3	6.65				2
103	Lawrencium	Lr	[266]	1.3	4.9				3
104	Rutherfordium	Rf	[267]		6				2
105	Dubnium	Db	[268]						2
106	Seaborgium	Sg	[269]						2
107	Bohrium	Bh	[270]						2
108	Hassium	Hs	[277]						2
109	Meitnerium	Mt	[278]						
110	Darmstadtium	Ds	[281]						
111	Roentgenium	Rg	[282]						
112	Copernicium	Cn	[285]						
113	Nihonium	Nh	[286]						
114	Flerovium	Fl	[289]						
115	Moscovium	Mc	[290]						
116	Livermorium	Lv	[293]						
117	Tennessine	Ts	[294]						
118	Oganesson	Og	[294]						

[*] a few atomic radii are calculated, not experimental
[—] a long dash marks properties for which there is no data available
[ ] a blank marks properties for which no data has been found
