= Periodicity =

Periodicity or periodic may refer to:

== Mathematics ==
- Bott periodicity theorem, addresses Bott periodicity: a modulo-8 recurrence relation in the homotopy groups of classical groups
- Periodic function, a function whose output contains values that repeat periodically
- Periodic mapping

== Physical sciences ==
- Periodic table of chemical elements
- Periodic trends, relative characteristics of chemical elements observed
- Redshift periodicity, astronomical term for redshift quantization
- Log-periodic antenna, type of broadband radio antenna

== Other uses ==
- Fokker periodicity blocks, which mathematically relate musical intervals
- Periodic acid, a compound of iodine
- Principle of periodicity, a concept in generally accepted accounting principles
- Quasiperiodicity, property of a system that displays irregular periodicity

== See also ==
- Aperiodic (disambiguation)
- Cycle (disambiguation)
- Frequency (disambiguation)
- Period (disambiguation)
- Periodical
- Seasonality, periodic variation, or periodic fluctuations
