= Television ratings =

Television ratings may refer to:

- An audience measurement technique
  - Target rating point, a metric used in marketing and advertising
  - By national organisations that compile audience measurement and television ratings
    - AGB Nielsen Philippines – in the Philippines
    - Broadcast Audience Research Council – in India
    - Broadcasters' Audience Research Board – in the United Kingdom
    - Nielsen TV ratings – in the United States
    - Television ratings in Australia – in Australia
- Television content rating systems, systems for evaluating the content and reporting the suitability of television programs for children or adults
  - Australian Classification Board – in Australia
  - TV Parental Guidelines – in the United States

== See also ==
- Rating (disambiguation)
