= Rate of change =

Rate of change may refer to:

- Rate of change (mathematics), either average rate of change or instantaneous rate of change
  - Instantaneous rate of change, rate of change at a given instant in time
- Rate of change (technical analysis), a simple technical indicator in finance

== See also ==
- Rate of climb or rate of altitude change in aeronautics
- Rate (disambiguation)
- Change (disambiguation)
- Frequency (disambiguation)
- Gradient (disambiguation)
