= Rate =

Rate or rates may refer to:

== Finance ==
- Rate (company), an American residential mortgage company formerly known as Guaranteed Rate
- Rates (tax), a type of taxation system used in some countries to fund local government
- Exchange rate, rate at which one currency will be exchanged for another

== Mathematics and science ==
- Rate (mathematics), a specific kind of ratio, in which two measurements are related to each other (often with respect to time)
- Rate function, a function used to quantify the probabilities of a rare event
- Reaction rate, in chemistry the speed at which reactants are converted into products

== Military ==
- Naval rate, a junior enlisted member of a navy
- Rating system of the Royal Navy, a former method of indicating a British warship's firepower

== People ==
- Ed Rate (1899–1990), American football player
- José Carlos Rates (1879–1945), General Secretary of the Portuguese Communist Party
- Peter of Rates (died 60 AD), traditionally considered to be the first bishop of Braga

== Other uses ==
- Rate (building), the class of a building in late Georgian and early Victorian construction standards
- Rates (Póvoa de Varzim), a Portuguese parish and town located in the municipality of Póvoa de Varzim
- Rate Bowl, an American postseason college football bowl game
- RATE project, a young earth creationism research project

== See also ==
- Rate of change (disambiguation)
- Rating (disambiguation)
- Ratio (disambiguation)
