= Atomic radii of the elements (data page) =

The atomic radius of a chemical element is the distance from the center of the nucleus to the outermost shell of an electron. Since the boundary is not a well-defined physical entity, there are various non-equivalent definitions of atomic radius. Depending on the definition, the term may apply only to isolated atoms, or also to atoms in condensed matter, covalently bound in molecules, or in ionized and excited states; and its value may be obtained through experimental measurements, or computed from theoretical models. Under some definitions, the value of the radius may depend on the atom's state and context.

Atomic radii vary in a predictable and explicable manner across the periodic table. For instance, the radii generally decrease rightward along each period (row) of the table, from the alkali metals to the noble gases; and increase down each group (column). The radius increases sharply between the noble gas at the end of each period and the alkali metal at the beginning of the next period. These trends of the atomic radii (and of various other chemical and physical properties of the elements) can be explained by the electron shell theory of the atom; they provided important evidence for the development and confirmation of quantum theory.

== Atomic radius ==
Note: All measurements given are in picometers (pm). For more recent data on covalent radii see Covalent radius. Just as atomic units are given in terms of the atomic mass unit (approximately the proton mass), the physically appropriate unit of length here is the Bohr radius, which is the radius of a hydrogen atom. The Bohr radius is consequently known as the "atomic unit of length". It is often denoted by a_{0} and is approximately 53 pm. Hence, the values of atomic radii given here in picometers can be converted to atomic units by dividing by 53, to the level of accuracy of the data given in this table.

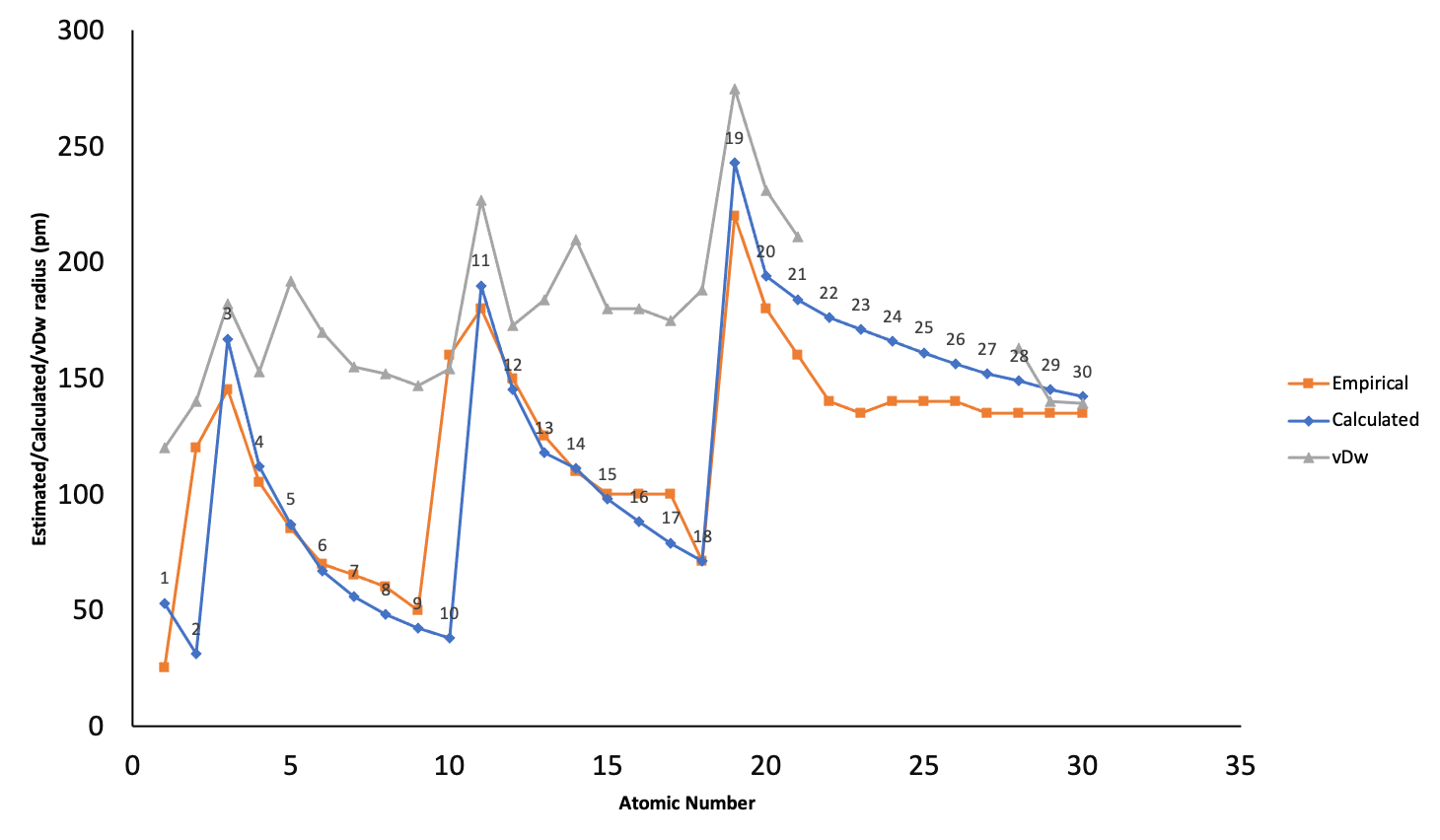
Atomic radii up to zinc (30)

atomic number	symbol	name	empirical †	Calculated	van der Waals	Covalent (single bond)	Covalent (triple bond)	Metallic
1	H	hydrogen	25	53	120 or 110	32		
2	He	helium	120	31	140	46		
3	Li	lithium	145	167	182 or 181	133		152
4	Be	beryllium	105	112	153	102	85	112
5	B	boron	85	87	192	85	73	
6	C	carbon	70	67	170	75	60	
7	N	nitrogen	65	56	155	71	54	
8	O	oxygen	60	48	152	63	53	
9	F	fluorine	50	42	147	64	53	
10	Ne	neon	160	38	154	67		
11	Na	sodium	180	190	227	155		186
12	Mg	magnesium	150	145	173	139	127	160
13	Al	aluminium	125	118	184	126	111	143
14	Si	silicon	110	111	210	116	102	
15	P	phosphorus	100	98	180	111	94	
16	S	sulfur	100	88	180	103	95	
17	Cl	chlorine	100	79	175	99	93	
18	Ar	argon	71	71	188	96	96	
19	K	potassium	220	243	275	196		227
20	Ca	calcium	180	194	231	171	133	197
21	Sc	scandium	160	184	211	148	114	162 ^{b}
22	Ti	titanium	140	176		136	108	147
23	V	vanadium	135	171		134	106	134 ^{b}
24	Cr	chromium	140	166		122	103	128 ^{b}
25	Mn	manganese	140	161		119	103	127 ^{b}
26	Fe	iron	140	156		116	102	126 ^{b}
27	Co	cobalt	135	152		111	96	125 ^{b}
28	Ni	nickel	135	149	163	110	101	124 ^{b}
29	Cu	copper	135	145	140	112	120	128 ^{b}
30	Zn	zinc	135	142	139	118		134 ^{b}
31	Ga	gallium	130	136	187	124	121	135 ^{c}
32	Ge	germanium	125	125	211	121	114	
33	As	arsenic	115	114	185	121	106	
34	Se	selenium	115	103	190	116	107	
35	Br	bromine	115	94	185 or 183	114	110	
36	Kr	krypton		88	202	117	108	
37	Rb	rubidium	235	265	303	210		248
38	Sr	strontium	200	219	249	185	139	215
39	Y	yttrium	180	212		163	124	180 ^{b}
40	Zr	zirconium	155	206		154	121	160
41	Nb	niobium	145	198		147	116	146 ^{b}
42	Mo	molybdenum	145	190		138	113	139 ^{b}
43	Tc	technetium	135	183		128	110	136 ^{b}
44	Ru	ruthenium	130	178		125	103	134 ^{b}
45	Rh	rhodium	135	173		125	106	134 ^{b}
46	Pd	palladium	140	169	163	120	112	137 ^{b}
47	Ag	silver	160	165	172	128	137	144 ^{b}
48	Cd	cadmium	155	161	158	136		151 ^{b}
49	In	indium	155	156	193	142	146	167
50	Sn	tin	145	145	217	140	132	
51	Sb	antimony	145	133	206	140	127	
52	Te	tellurium	140	123	206	136	121	
53	I	iodine	140	115	198	133	125	
54	Xe	xenon		108	216	131	122	
55	Cs	caesium	260	298	343	232		265
56	Ba	barium	215	253	268	196	149	222
57	La	lanthanum	195	226		180	139	187 ^{b}
58	Ce	cerium	185	210		163	131	181.8 ^{c}
59	Pr	praseodymium	185	247		176	128	182.4 ^{c}
60	Nd	neodymium	185	206		174		181.4 ^{c}
61	Pm	promethium	185	205		173		183.4 ^{c}
62	Sm	samarium	185	238		172		180.4 ^{c}
63	Eu	europium	185	231		168		180.4 ^{c}
64	Gd	gadolinium	180	233		169	132	180.4 ^{c}
65	Tb	terbium	175	225		168		177.3 ^{c}
66	Dy	dysprosium	175	228		167		178.1 ^{c}
67	Ho	holmium	175	226		166		176.2 ^{c}
68	Er	erbium	175	226		165		176.1 ^{c}
69	Tm	thulium	175	222		164		175.9 ^{c}
70	Yb	ytterbium	175	222		170		176 ^{c}
71	Lu	lutetium	175	217		162	131	173.8 ^{c}
72	Hf	hafnium	155	208		152	122	159
73	Ta	tantalum	145	200		146	119	146 ^{b}
74	W	tungsten	135	193		137	115	139 ^{b}
75	Re	rhenium	135	188		131	110	137 ^{b}
76	Os	osmium	130	185		129	109	135 ^{b}
77	Ir	iridium	135	180		122	107	135.5 ^{b}
78	Pt	platinum	135	177	175	123	110	138.5 ^{b}
79	Au	gold	135	174	166	124	123	144 ^{b}
80	Hg	mercury	150	171	155	133		151 ^{b}
81	Tl	thallium	190	156	196	144	150	170
82	Pb	lead	180	154	202	144	137	
83	Bi	bismuth	160	143	207	151	135	
84	Po	polonium	190	135	197	145	129	
85	At	astatine		127	202	147	138	
86	Rn	radon		120	220	142	133	
87	Fr	francium			348			
88	Ra	radium	215		283	201	159	
89	Ac	actinium	195			186	140	
90	Th	thorium	180			175	136	179 ^{b}
91	Pa	protactinium	180			169	129	163 ^{d}
92	U	uranium	175		186	170	118	156 ^{e}
93	Np	neptunium	175			171	116	155 ^{e}
94	Pu	plutonium	175			172		159 ^{e}
95	Am	americium	175			166		173 ^{b}
96	Cm	curium	176			166		174 ^{b}
97	Bk	berkelium						170 ^{b}
98	Cf	californium						186±2 ^{b}
99	Es	einsteinium						186±2 ^{b}
100	Fm	fermium						
101	Md	mendelevium						
102	No	nobelium						
103	Lr	lawrencium						
104	Rf	rutherfordium					131	
105	Db	dubnium					126	
106	Sg	seaborgium					121	
107	Bh	bohrium					119	
108	Hs	hassium					118	
109	Mt	meitnerium					113	
110	Ds	darmstadtium					112	
111	Rg	roentgenium					118	
112	Cn	copernicium					130	
113	Nh	nihonium						
114	Fl	flerovium						
115	Mc	moscovium						
116	Lv	livermorium						
117	Ts	tennessine						
118	Og	oganesson						

== See also ==
- Atomic radius
- Covalent radius (Single-, double- and triple-bond radii, up to the superheavy elements.)
- Ionic radius

== Notes ==
- Difference between empirical and calculated data: Empirical data basically means, "originating in or based on observation or experience" or "relying on experience or observation alone often without due regard for system and theory data". It basically means that you measured it through physical observation, and a lot of experiments generating the same results. Although, note that the values are not calculated by a formula. However, often the empirical results then become an equation of estimation. Calculated data on the other hand are only based on theories. Such theoretical predictions are useful when there are no ways of measuring radii experimentally, if you want to predict the radius of an element that hasn't been discovered yet, or it has too short of a half-life.
- The radius of an atom is not a uniquely defined property and depends on the definition. Data derived from other sources with different assumptions cannot be compared.
- † to an accuracy of about 5 pm
- (b) 12 coordinate
- (c) gallium has an anomalous crystal structure
- (d) 10 coordinate
- (e) uranium, neptunium and plutonium have irregular structures
- Triple bond mean-square deviation 3pm.
