= Rating =

A rating is an evaluation or assessment of something, in terms of a metric (e.g. quality, quantity, a combination of both,...).

Rating or rating system may also refer to:

== Business and economics ==
- Credit rating, estimating the credit worthiness of an individual, corporation or country
- Ranally city rating system, a tool used to classify U.S. cities based on economic function
- Telecommunications rating, the calculated cost of a phone call

== Entertainment ==
- Arbitron ratings or Nielsen Audio, consumer research on radio broadcasting audiences in the United States
- Content rating, the suitability of a TV broadcast, movie, comic book, or video game to its audience
  - Motion picture rating system, categorizes films according to their suitability for adults and children
  - Television content rating systems, categorizes TV shows based on suitability for audiences
  - Video game content rating system, categorizes video games based on suitability for players
- Audience measurement
  - Nielsen ratings, measuring viewership of United States television programs

== Polling and opinion ==
- Approval rating, the share of respondents to an opinion poll who approve of a politician
  - United States presidential approval ratings
- Cardinal voting systems, where candidates for office are assigned scores ("ratings") independently from each other
  - Approval voting, a voting system that elects the candidate with the highest approval ratings
- Rating (sociological group), a Ukrainian non-governmental polling organization
- Reputation system, programs that allow users to rate each other in online communities

== Sports ==
- Rating (chess), estimate of the strength of a player, based on performance versus other players
  - Elo rating system, a rating system used in chess and in other sports and games
- Sports rating system, analyzes the results of sports competitions

== Technology and engineering ==
- Rating (electrical), the parameter at which the appliance is designed to work
- Fire-resistance rating, the duration for a passive fire protection to withstand a standard fire resistance test
- Cetane rating, an indicator of the combustion speed of diesel fuel and compression needed for ignition
- Octane rating, a standard measure of the performance of an engine or aviation fuel
- Performance Rating, formerly a method of comparing x86 computer processors
- Power rating, in electrical or mechanical engineering, the highest power input allowed to flow through particular equipment

== Other uses ==
- Rating (clinical trials), the process by which a human evaluator subjectively judges the response of a patient to a medical treatment
- Rating (wine), score assigned by one or more wine critics to a wine
- Rating site, a website designed for users to vote on or rate people or content
- Naval rating, an enlisted member of a navy or coast guard defined by rank and job description.
- Health care ratings, evaluations of health care
- Rating system of the Royal Navy - an historic method to classify ship by how heavily armed they are. Applied to other navies vessels as a comparison.

== See also ==
- Rate (disambiguation)
- Television ratings (disambiguation)
- Grading in education, standardized measurements of varying levels of achievement
- Star (classification), symbols often used for ratings
- Likert scale, a psychometric scale commonly involved in research
- Parental Advisory, a warning label placed on audio recordings in recognition of excessive profanities or inappropriate references
