= Surface core level shift =

Type of electron shift

A surface core level shift (SCS) is a kind of core-level shift that often emerges in X-ray photoelectron spectroscopy spectra of surface atoms.

Because surface atoms have different chemical environments from bulk atoms, small shifts of binding energies are observed by X-ray photoelectron spectroscopy. SCS is ascribed mainly to the lower coordination numbers of surface atoms than bulk atoms. Reduced coordination leads to narrower valence bandwidth. Such narrowing of the bandwidth increases the density of states, and if more than half of the valence band is filled, the band center is lower than bulk and the binding energy increases. In contrast, if less than half of the valence band is filled, the band center is higher than bulk, and the binding energy decreases.

Because the binding energy in X-ray photoelectron spectroscopy is affected by the final state and other chemical environments, this simple explanation cannot always be applied to the interpretation of X-ray photoelectron spectra. In spite of such complexity, the SCS gives important information about the chemical nature of surface atoms.
