= Aperiodic (disambiguation) =

Aperiodic means non-periodic. Typically it refers to aperiodic function. Aperiodic may also refer to:

- Aperiodic finite state automaton
- Aperiodic frequency
- Aperiodic graph
- Aperiodic semigroup
- Aperiodic set of prototiles
- Aperiodic tiling

== See also ==
- Periodic (disambiguation)
- Strange attractor, a region reached asymptotically by a dynamic system showing no periodic repeating pattern
