= Slater's rules =

Semi-empirical rules for quantum chemistry

In quantum chemistry, Slater's rules provide numerical values for the effective nuclear charge in a many-electron atom. Each electron is said to experience less than the actual nuclear charge, because of shielding or screening by the other electrons. For each electron in an atom, Slater's rules provide a value for the screening constant, denoted by s, S, or σ, which relates the effective and actual nuclear charges as

$$Z_{\mathrm{eff}}= Z - s.\,$$

The rules were devised semi-empirically by John C. Slater and published in 1930.

Revised values of screening constants based on computations of atomic structure by the Hartree–Fock method were obtained by Enrico Clementi et al. in the 1960s.

== Rules ==
Firstly, the electrons are arranged into a sequence of groups in order of increasing principal quantum number n, and for equal n in order of increasing azimuthal quantum number l, except that s- and p- orbitals are kept together.

[1s] [2s,2p] [3s,3p] [3d] [4s,4p] [4d] [4f] [5s, 5p] [5d] etc.

Each group is given a different shielding constant which depends upon the number and types of electrons in those groups preceding it.

The shielding constant for each group is formed as the sum of the following contributions:

1. An amount of 0.35 from each other electron within the same group except for the [1s] group, where the other electron contributes only 0.30.
2. If the group is of the [ns, np] type, an amount of 0.85 from each electron with principal quantum number (n–1), and an amount of 1.00 for each electron with principal quantum number (n–2) or less.
3. If the group is of the [d] or [f], type, an amount of 1.00 for each electron "closer" to the nucleus than the group. This includes both i) electrons with a smaller principal quantum number than n and ii) electrons with principal quantum number n and a smaller azimuthal quantum number l.

In tabular form, the rules are summarized as:

Group	Other electrons in the same group	Electrons in group(s) with principal quantum number n and azimuthal quantum number < l	Electrons in group(s) with principal quantum number n–1	Electrons in all group(s) with principal quantum number ≤ n–2
[1s]	0.30	-	-	-
[ns,np]	0.35	-	0.85	1
[nd] or [nf]	0.35	1	1	1

== Example ==
An example provided in Slater's original paper is for the iron atom which has nuclear charge 26 and electronic configuration 1s^{2}2s^{2}2p^{6}3s^{2}3p^{6}3d^{6}4s^{2}. The screening constant, and subsequently the shielded (or effective) nuclear charge for each electron is deduced as:

$$\begin{matrix}
4s     &: s = 0.35 \times 1& + &0.85 \times 14 &+& 1.00 \times 10 &=& 22.25 &\Rightarrow& Z_{\mathrm{eff}}(4s) = 26.00 - 22.25 = 3.75\\
3d     &: s = 0.35 \times 5&   &               &+& 1.00 \times 18 &=& 19.75 &\Rightarrow& Z_{\mathrm{eff}}(3d)= 26.00 - 19.75 =6.25\\
3s,3p    &: s = 0.35 \times 7& + &0.85 \times  8 &+& 1.00 \times  2 &=& 11.25 &\Rightarrow& Z_{\mathrm{eff}}(3s,3p)= 26.00 - 11.25 =14.75\\
2s,2p    &: s = 0.35 \times 7& + &0.85 \times  2 & &                &=& 4.15  &\Rightarrow& Z_{\mathrm{eff}}(2s,2p)= 26.00 - 4.15 =21.85\\
1s       &: s = 0.30 \times 1&   &               & &                &=& 0.30  &\Rightarrow& Z_{\mathrm{eff}}(1s)= 26.00 - 0.30 =25.70
\end{matrix}$$

Note that the effective nuclear charge is calculated by subtracting the screening constant from the atomic number, 26.

== Motivation ==
The rules were developed by John C. Slater in an attempt to construct simple analytic expressions for the atomic orbital of any electron in an atom. Specifically, for each electron in an atom, Slater wished to determine shielding constants (s) and "effective" quantum numbers (n*) such that

$$\psi_{n^{*}s}(r) = r^{n^{*}-1}\exp\left(-\frac{(Z-s)r}{n^{*}}\right)$$

provides a reasonable approximation to a single-electron wave function. Slater defined n* by the rule that for n = 1, 2, 3, 4, 5, 6 respectively; n* = 1, 2, 3, 3.7, 4.0 and 4.2. This was an arbitrary adjustment to fit calculated atomic energies to experimental data.

Such a form was inspired by the known wave function spectrum of hydrogen-like atoms which have the radial component

$$R_{nl}(r) = r^{l}f_{nl}(r)\exp\left(-\frac{Zr}{n}\right),$$

where n is the (true) principal quantum number, l the azimuthal quantum number, and f_{nl}(r) is an oscillatory polynomial with n - l - 1 nodes. Slater argued on the basis of previous calculations by Clarence Zener that the presence of radial nodes was not required to obtain a reasonable approximation. He also noted that in the asymptotic limit (far away from the nucleus), his approximate form coincides with the exact hydrogen-like wave function in the presence of a nuclear charge of Z-s and in the state with a principal quantum number n equal to his effective quantum number n*.

Slater then argued, again based on the work of Zener, that the total energy of a N-electron atom with a wavefunction constructed from orbitals of his form should be well approximated as

$$E = -\sum_{i=1}^{N}\left(\frac{Z-s_{i}}{n^{*}_{i}}\right)^{2}.$$

Using this expression for the total energy of an atom (or ion) as a function of the shielding constants and effective quantum numbers, Slater was able to compose rules such that spectral energies calculated agree reasonably well with experimental values for a wide range of atoms. Using the values in the iron example above, the total energy of a neutral iron atom using this method is −2497.2 Ry, while the energy of an excited Fe^{+} cation lacking a single 1s electron is −1964.6 Ry. The difference, 532.6 Ry, can be compared to the experimental (circa 1930) K absorption limit of 524.0 Ry.
