= Ratio (disambiguation) =

A ratio is a relationship between numbers or quantities.

Ratio may also refer to:

- Ratio (journal), a philosophical quarterly
- Ratio, Arkansas, a community in the United States
- Ratio decidendi, a legal concept
- Ratio Institute, a Swedish institute
- Ratio scale, a statistical level of measurement
- Ratio, a 2009 book on cooking by Michael Ruhlman
- 'Ratio' as a term used on the social media website Twitter
