= Shielding effect =

Decrease in attraction between an electron and the nucleus

In chemistry, the shielding effect, sometimes referred to as atomic shielding, screening effect, or electron shielding, describes the phenomenon where inner-core electrons repel outer electrons, reducing the net attraction exerted by the nucleus. The shielding effect can be defined as a reduction in the effective nuclear charge experienced by electrons in outer shells. It is a special case of electrostatic screening in atomic physics. This effect is also significant in various fields of materials science.

== Strength per electron shell and orbital ==
The strength of the shielding depends primarily on two factors: the distance of the electron shell from the nucleus and orbital penetration capabilities. The wider the electron shells are in space, the weaker the net electrostatic interaction becomes due to the increased shielding provided by inner shells.

Furthermore, due to differences in orbital shapes (orbital penetration), the screening strength, S, varies among sublevels (s, p, d, and f). Orbitals of type s have a higher probability density close to the nucleus (greater penetration), meaning their electrons experience less shielding and provide a more effective screening screen for outer orbitals (p, d, and f).

== Description ==
In the hydrogen atom (which has only a single electron and therefore no inner-core electrons), the electron experiences the full electromagnetic attraction of the nucleus. However, in multi-electron atoms, each outer-shell electron experiences both the attraction from the positive nucleus and the electrostatic repulsion from electrons in lower shells.

This causes the net force on valence electrons to be significantly smaller in magnitude than the actual nuclear charge. Consequently, these outer electrons are less tightly bound to the nucleus, which explains why they are more easily removed during ionization or chemical bonding.

The magnitude of the shielding effect is difficult to calculate precisely due to quantum mechanical effects. As an approximation, we can estimate the effective nuclear charge ($Z_\mathrm{eff}$) on each electron using the following formula:

$$Z_\mathrm{eff}=Z- \sigma \,$$

Where:

- Z is the atomic number (number of protons in the nucleus);
- $\sigma\,$ is the screening constant, which can be determined using quantum chemistry methods (solving the Schrödinger equation) or estimated empirically via Slater's rules.

In Rutherford backscattering spectroscopy, the correction due to electron screening also modifies the Coulomb repulsion between the incident ion and the target nucleus at large distances, accounting for the screening effect caused by inner electrons.

== See also ==
- Atomic number
- Core charge
- Chemical shift
- Effective nuclear charge
- Noble gas compound
- Steric effects
- Lanthanide contraction
- d-block contraction (or scandide contraction)
