= Lanthanide contraction =

Decrease of ionic radii across the lanthanide series

The lanthanide contraction is the steady decrease in the ionic radii of the elements in the lanthanide series, from left to right. It is caused by the imperfect shielding of the increasing nuclear charge by the 4f electrons. About 10% of the lanthanide contraction has been attributed to relativistic effects.

The 4f electrons continue to shield imperfectly as the 5d subshell begins to be filled. This results in smaller than otherwise expected atomic radii and ionic radii for the subsequent d-block elements starting with 71, lutetium. This effect causes the radii of transition metals of group 5 and 6 to become unusually similar, as the expected increase in radius going down a period is nearly cancelled out by the f-block insertion, and has many other far ranging consequences in post-lanthanide elements.

The atomic radii of the lanthanides also decreases across the group, but not uniformly as is the case with the 3+ ions:

Element	Atomic electron configuration (all begin with [Xe])	Ln^{3+} electron configuration	Ln^{3+} radius (pm) (6-coordinate)
La	5d^{1}6s^{2}	4f^{0}	103
Ce	4f^{1}5d^{1}6s^{2}	4f^{1}	102
Pr	4f^{3}6s^{2}	4f^{2}	99
Nd	4f^{4}6s^{2}	4f^{3}	98.3
Pm	4f^{5}6s^{2}	4f^{4}	97
Sm	4f^{6}6s^{2}	4f^{5}	95.8
Eu	4f^{7}6s^{2}	4f^{6}	94.7
Gd	4f^{7}5d^{1}6s^{2}	4f^{7}	93.8
Tb	4f^{9}6s^{2}	4f^{8}	92.3
Dy	4f^{10}6s^{2}	4f^{9}	91.2
Ho	4f^{11}6s^{2}	4f^{10}	90.1
Er	4f^{12}6s^{2}	4f^{11}	89
Tm	4f^{13}6s^{2}	4f^{12}	88
Yb	4f^{14}6s^{2}	4f^{13}	86.8
Lu	4f^{14}5d^{1}6s^{2}	4f^{14}	86.1

The term was coined by the Norwegian geochemist Victor Goldschmidt in his series "Geochemische Verteilungsgesetze der Elemente" (Geochemical distribution laws of the elements).

== Cause ==
The effect results from imperfect shielding of nuclear charge (nuclear attractive force on electrons) by 4f electrons; the 5p and 5s electrons (which are the outermost electrons in the 3+ ions) are drawn towards the nucleus, thus resulting in a smaller ionic radius.

In single-electron atoms, the average separation of an electron from the nucleus is determined by the subshell it belongs to, and decreases with increasing charge on the nucleus; this, in turn, leads to a decrease in atomic radius. In multi-electron atoms, the decrease in radius brought about by an increase in nuclear charge is partially offset by increasing electrostatic repulsion among electrons.

Despite its name, the lanthanide contraction is less pronounced than the contraction across other periods. For example, empirical atomic radius decreases across the 2p block from 85 pm for boron to 50 pm for fluorine. Whereas, in the lanthanide ions, the ionic radius drops from 103 pm for lanthanum(III) to 86.1 pm for lutetium(III).

About 10% of the lanthanide contraction has been attributed to relativistic effects. The lanthanide contraction was experimentally observed in aqueous solutions of lanthanides, including radioactive promethium, through X-ray absorption spectroscopy measurements.

== Effects ==
The results of the increased attraction of the outer shell electrons across the lanthanide period may be divided into effects on the lanthanide series itself including the decrease in ionic radii, and influences on the following or post-lanthanide elements.

=== Properties of the lanthanides ===
The ionic radii of the lanthanides decrease from 103 pm (La^{3+}) to 86 pm (Lu^{3+}) in the lanthanide series as electrons are added to the 4f shell. This first f subshell is inside the full 5s and 5p shells (as well as the 6s shell in the neutral atom); the 4f shell is well-localized near the atomic nucleus and has little effect on chemical bonding. However, the fact that the decrease in ionic radius is smooth and predictable allows for chromatographic separation of lanthanide ions exploiting the fact that complex stability with anionic ligands (such as EDTA^{4-}) increases as radius decreases. Another effect of the lanthanide contraction is the decrease in coordination number across the series. Even when the mass of an atomic nucleus is the same, a decrease in the atomic volume has a corresponding increase in the density as illustrated by alpha crystals of cerium (at 77 kelvin) and gamma crystals of cerium (near room temperature) where the atomic volume of the latter is 120.3% of the former and the density of the former is 120.5% of the latter (i.e., 20.696 vs 17.2 and 8.16 vs 6.770, respectively).

As expected, when more mass (protons & neutrons) is packed into a space that is subject to "contraction", the density increases consistently with atomic number for the lanthanides (excluding the atypical 2nd, 7th, and 14th) culminating in the value for the last lanthanide (Lu) being 160% of the first lanthanide (La). Melting points (in kelvin) also increase consistently across these 12 lanthanides culminating in the value for the last being 161% of the first. This density-melting point association does not depend upon just a comparison between these two lanthanides because the correlation coefficient (Pearson product-moment) for density and melting point for these 12 lanthanides is 0.982 and 0.946 for all 15 lanthanides. There is a general trend of increasing Vickers hardness, Brinell hardness, density and melting point from lanthanum to lutetium (with europium and ytterbium being the most notable exceptions; in the metallic state, they are divalent rather than trivalent). Cerium, along with europium and ytterbium, are atypical when their properties are compared with the other 12 lanthanides as evidenced by the clearly lower values (than either adjacent element) for melting points (lower by >10<43%), Vickers hardness (lower by >32<82%), and densities (lower by >26<33%, when exclude Ce, where the density increases by 10% vs lanthanum). The lower densities for europium and ytterbium (than their adjacent lanthanides) are associated with larger atomic volumes at 148% and 128% of the average volume for the typical 12 lanthanides (i.e., 28.979, 25.067, and 19.629 cm3/mol, respectively).

Because the atomic volume of Yb is 21% more than that of Ce, it is understandable that the density for Ce (the 2nd lanthanide) is 98% of that of ytterbium (the 14th lanthanide) when there is a 24% increase in atomic weight for the latter, and the melting point for Ce (1068 K) is nearly the same as the 1097 K for ytterbium and the 1099 K for europium. These 3 elements are the only lanthanides with melting points below the lowest for the other twelve, which is 1193 K for lanthanum. Because europium has a half-filled 4f subshell, this may account for its atypical values when compared with the data for 12 of the lanthanides. Lutetium is the hardest and densest lanthanide and has the highest melting point at 1925 K, which is the year that Goldschmidt published the terminology "Die Lanthaniden-Kontraktion."

Unlike the m. p. data for the lanthanides (where the values increase consistently when the 2nd, 7th & 14th are excluded), the b. p. temperatures show a repeated pattern at 162% and 165% for the 8th lanthanide relative to the 6th and the 15th relative to the 13th (which ignores the atypical 7th and 14th). The 8th and 15th are among the four lanthanides with one electron in the 5d shell (where the others are the 1st and 2nd) and the b. p. values for these four are +/- 2.6% about 3642 K. See the post-lanthanides section for more comments on the 5d-shell electrons. There is also a repeated b. p. pattern at 66% and 71% for the 6th and 13th lanthanides (relative to the preceding elements) that differ by one electron in the 4f shell, i.e., 5 to 6 and 12 to 13.

Element	Vickers hardness (MPa)	Brinell hardness (MPa)	Density (g/cm^{3})	Melting point (K)	Atomic radius (pm)	Boiling point (K)
Lanthanum	491	363	6.162	1193	187	3737
Cerium	270	412	6.770	1068	181.8	3716
Praseodymium	400	481	6.77	1208	182	3403
Neodymium	343	265	7.01	1297	181	3347
Promethium	?	?	7.26	1315	183	3273
Samarium	412	441	7.52	1345	180	2173
Europium	167	?	5.264	1099	180	1802
Gadolinium	570	?	7.90	1585	180	3546
Terbium	863	677	8.23	1629	177	3396
Dysprosium	540	500	8.540	1680	178	2840
Holmium	481	746	8.79	1734	176	2873
Erbium	589	814	9.066	1802	176	3141
Thulium	520	471	9.32	1818	176	2223
Ytterbium	206	343	6.90	1097	176	1469
Lutetium	1160	893	9.841	1925	174	3675

=== Magnetism of the lanthanides ===
It has been shown that lanthanide contraction plays a crucial role in determining the magnetic phase diagram of the heavy rare-earth elements, i.e. those from Gadolinium onwards.

=== Influence on the post-lanthanides ===
The lanthanide contraction causes the transition metals in periods 5 and 6 that are in the same group to have near-identical atomic and ionic radii. This makes their separation by chemical means very difficult.

The elements following the lanthanides in the periodic table are influenced by the lanthanide contraction. When the first three post-lanthanide elements (Hf, Ta, and W) are combined with the 12 lanthanides, the Pearson correlation coefficient increases from 0.982 to 0.997. On average for the 12 lanthanides, the melting point (on the Kelvin scale) = 1.92x the density (in g/cm^3) while the three elements following the lanthanides have similar values at 188x, 197x, and 192x before the densities continue to increase but the melting points decrease for the next 2 elements followed by both properties decreasing (at different rates) for the next 8 elements. Hafnium is rather unique because not only do density and m. p. temperature change proportionally (relative to lutetium, the last lanthanide) at 135% and 130% but also the b. p. temperature at 133%. The elements with 2, 3, & 4 electrons in the 5d shell (post-lanthanides Hf, Ta, W) have increasing b. p. values such that the b. p. value for W (wolfram, aka tungsten) is 169% of that for the element with one 5d electron (Lu). The high melting point and two other properties of tungsten originates from strong covalent bonds formed between tungsten atoms by the 5d electrons. The elements with 5 to 10 electrons in the 5d shell (Re to Hg) have progressively lower b. p. values such that the element with ten 5d electrons (Hg) has a b. p. value at 52% of tungsten's (with four 5d electrons).

The radii of the period-6 transition metals are smaller than would be expected if there were no lanthanides, and are in fact very similar to the radii of the period-5 transition metals since the effect of the additional electron shell is almost entirely offset by the lanthanide contraction. For example, the atomic radius of the metal zirconium, Zr (a period-5 transition element), is 155 pm (empirical value) and that of hafnium, Hf (the corresponding period-6 element), is 159 pm. The ionic radius of Zr^{4+} is 84 pm and that of Hf^{4+} is 83 pm. The radii are very similar even though the number of electrons increases from 40 to 72 and the atomic mass increases from 91.22 to 178.49 g/mol. The increase in mass and the unchanged radii lead to a steep increase in density from 6.51 to 13.35 g/cm^{3}.

Zirconium and hafnium, therefore, have very similar chemical behavior, having closely similar radii and electron configurations. Radius-dependent properties such as lattice energies, solvation energies, and stability constants of complexes are also similar. Because of this similarity, hafnium is found only in association with zirconium, which is much more abundant. This also meant that hafnium was discovered as a separate element in 1923, 134 years after zirconium was discovered in 1789. Titanium, on the other hand, is in the same group, but differs enough from those two metals that it is seldom found with them.

== See also ==
- Actinide contraction
- D-block contraction (or scandide contraction)
- Lanthanide
