= Relativistic quantum chemistry =

Theories of quantum chemistry explained via relativistic mechanics

Relativistic quantum chemistry combines relativistic mechanics with quantum chemistry to calculate elemental properties and structure, especially for the heavier elements of the periodic table. A prominent example is an explanation for the color of gold: due to relativistic effects, it is not silvery like most other metals.

The term "relativistic effects" was developed in light of the history of quantum mechanics. Initially, quantum mechanics was developed without considering the theory of relativity. Relativistic effects are those discrepancies between values calculated by models that consider relativity and those that do not. Relativistic effects are important for heavier elements with high atomic numbers, such as lanthanides and actinides.

Relativistic effects in chemistry can be considered to be perturbations, or small corrections, to the non-relativistic theory of chemistry, which is developed from the solutions of the Schrödinger equation. These corrections affect the electrons differently depending on the electron speed compared with the speed of light. Relativistic effects are more prominent in heavy elements because only in these elements do electrons attain sufficient speeds for the elements to have properties that differ from what non-relativistic chemistry predicts.

== History ==
Beginning in 1935, Bertha Swirles described a relativistic treatment of a many-electron system, despite Paul Dirac's 1929 assertion that the only imperfections remaining in quantum mechanics "give rise to difficulties only when high-speed particles are involved and are therefore of no importance in the consideration of the atomic and molecular structure and ordinary chemical reactions in which it is, indeed, usually sufficiently accurate if one neglects relativity variation of mass and velocity and assumes only Coulomb forces between the various electrons and atomic nuclei".

Theoretical chemists by and large agreed with Dirac's sentiment until the 1970s, when relativistic effects were observed in heavy elements. The Schrödinger equation had been developed without considering relativity in Schrödinger's 1926 article. Relativistic corrections were made to the Schrödinger equation (see Klein–Gordon equation) to describe the fine structure of atomic spectra, but this development and others did not immediately trickle into the chemical community. Since atomic spectral lines were largely in the realm of physics and not in that of chemistry, most chemists were unfamiliar with relativistic quantum mechanics, and their attention was on lighter elements typical for the organic chemistry focus of the time.

Dirac's opinion on the role relativistic quantum mechanics would play for chemical systems has been largely dismissed for two main reasons. First, electrons in s and p atomic orbitals travel at a significant fraction of the speed of light. Second, relativistic effects give rise to indirect consequences that are especially evident for d and f atomic orbitals.

== Qualitative treatment ==
Relativistic Lorentz factor ($\gamma$) as a function of velocity. As velocity approaches zero, $E_\text{rel}$ (the ordinate) becomes equal to $E_0 = m c^2,$ but as $v_e \to c , \gamma$ and $E_\text{rel}$ go to infinity.

One of the most important and familiar results of relativity is that the relativistic mass of the electron increases as
$$m_\text{rel} = \gamma m_e = \frac{m_e}{\sqrt{1 - (v_e/c)^2}}$$
where $\gamma, m_e, v_e, c$ are the Lorentz factor, electron rest mass, velocity of the electron, and speed of light respectively. The figure at the right illustrates this relativistic effect as a function of velocity.

This has an immediate implication on the Bohr radius ($a_0$), which is given by

$$a_0 = \frac{\hbar}{m_\text{e} c \alpha},$$

where $\hbar$ is the reduced Planck constant, and α is the fine-structure constant (a relativistic correction for the Bohr model).

Bohr calculated that a 1s orbital electron of a hydrogen atom orbiting at the Bohr radius of 0.0529 nm travels at nearly 1/137 the speed of light. One can extend this to a larger element with an atomic number Z by using the expression $v \approx \frac{Zc}{137}$ for a 1s electron, where v is its radial velocity, i.e., its instantaneous speed tangent to the radius of the atom. For gold with Z = 79, v ≈ 0.58c, so the 1s electron will be moving at 58% of the speed of light. Substituting this in for v/c in the equation for the relativistic mass, one finds that m_{rel} = 1.22m_{e}, and in turn putting this in for the Bohr radius above one finds that the radius shrinks by 22%.

If one substitutes the "relativistic mass" into the equation for the Bohr radius it can be written
$$a_\text{rel} = \frac{\hbar \sqrt{1 - (v_\text{e}/c)^2}}{m_\text{e} c \alpha}.$$
It follows that
$$\frac{a_\text{rel}}{a_0} = \sqrt{1 - (v_\text{e}/c)^2}.$$

Ratio of relativistic and nonrelativistic Bohr radii, as a function of electron velocity

The ratio of the relativistic and nonrelativistic Bohr radii is simply $1 / \gamma$, which as a function of the electron velocity is a circular arc. The relativistic radius reduces strongly as the electron velocity approaches $c$.

When the Bohr treatment is extended to hydrogenic atoms, the Bohr radius becomes
$$r = \frac{n^2}{Z} a_0 = \frac{n^2 \hbar^2 4 \pi \varepsilon_0}{m_\text{e}Ze^2},$$
where $n$ is the principal quantum number, and Z is an integer for the atomic number. In the Bohr model, the angular momentum is given as $mv_\text{e}r = n\hbar$. Substituting into the equation above and solving for $v_\text{e}$ gives
$$\begin{align}
r &= \frac{n^2 a_0}{Z} = \frac{n \hbar}{m v_\text{e}}, \\
v_\text{e} &= \frac{Z}{n^2 a_0} \frac{n \hbar}{m}, \\
\frac{v_\text{e}}{c} &= \frac{Z \alpha}{n} = \frac{Z e^2}{4 \pi \varepsilon_0 \hbar c n}.
\end{align}$$

Substituting the second-last equality into the expression for the Bohr ratio mentioned above gives

$\frac{a_\text{rel}}{a_0} = \sqrt{1 - (Z \alpha / n)^2}$ and since $\alpha \approx 1 / 137,$

$\frac{a_\text{rel}}{a_0} \approx \sqrt{1 - \left(\frac {Z}{137 n}\right)^2}$

At this point one can see that a low value of $n$ and a high value of $Z$ results in $\frac{a_\text{rel}}{a_0} < 1$. This fits with intuition: electrons with lower principal quantum numbers will have a higher probability density of being nearer to the nucleus. A nucleus with a large charge will cause an electron to have a high velocity. A higher electron velocity means an increased electron relativistic mass, and as a result the electrons will be near the nucleus more of the time and thereby contract the radius for small principal quantum numbers.

== Periodic table deviations ==
=== Mercury ===
Mercury (Hg) is a liquid down to approximately −39 °C, its melting point. Bonding forces are weaker for Hg–Hg bonds than for their immediate neighbors such as cadmium (m.p. 321 °C) and gold (m.p. 1064 °C). The lanthanide contraction only partially accounts for this anomaly. Because the 6s^{2} orbital is contracted by relativistic effects and may therefore only weakly contribute to any chemical bonding, Hg–Hg bonding must be mostly the result of van der Waals forces.

Mercury gas is mostly monatomic, Hg_{(g)}. Hg_{2(g)} rarely forms and has a low dissociation energy, as expected due to the lack of strong bonds.

Au_{2(g)} and Hg_{(g)} are analogous with H_{2(g)} and He_{(g)} with regard to having the same nature of difference. The relativistic contraction of the 6s^{2} orbital leads to gaseous mercury sometimes being referred to as a pseudo noble gas.

=== Color of gold and caesium ===
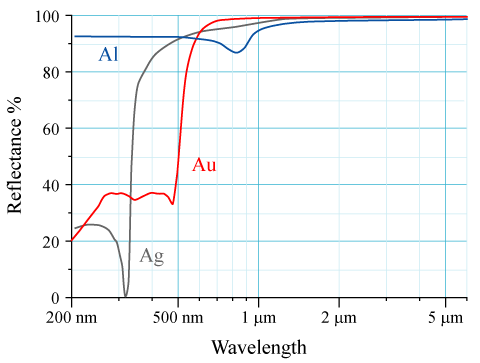
Spectral reflectance curves for aluminum (Al), silver (Ag), and gold (Au) metal mirrors

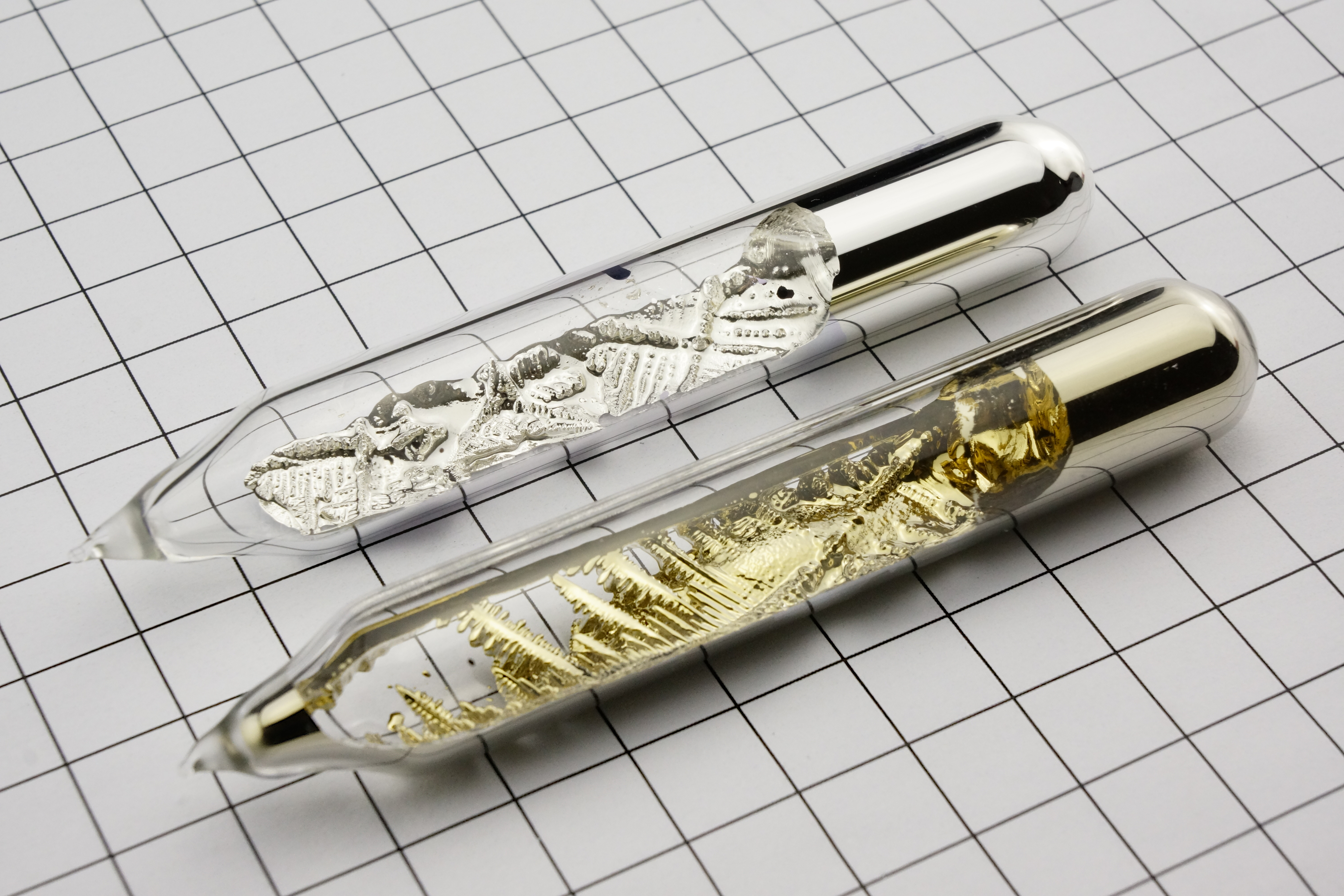
Alkali-metal coloration: rubidium (silvery) versus caesium (golden)

The reflectivity of aluminium (Al), silver (Ag), and gold (Au) is shown in the graph to the right. The human eye sees electromagnetic radiation with a wavelength near 600 nm as yellow. Gold absorbs blue light more than it absorbs other visible wavelengths of light; the reflected light reaching the eye is therefore lacking in blue compared with the incident light. Since yellow is complementary to blue, this makes a piece of gold under white light appear yellow to human eyes.

The electronic transition from the 5d orbital to the 6s orbital is responsible for this absorption. An analogous transition occurs in silver, but the relativistic effects are smaller than in gold. While silver's 4d orbital experiences some relativistic expansion and the 5s orbital contraction, the 4d–5s distance in silver is much greater than the 5d–6s distance in gold. The relativistic effects increase the 5d orbital's distance from the atom's nucleus and decrease the 6s orbital's distance. Due to the decreased 6s orbital distance, the electronic transition primarily absorbs in the violet/blue region of the visible spectrum, as opposed to the UV region.

Caesium, the heaviest of the alkali metals that can be collected in quantities sufficient for viewing, has a golden hue, whereas the other alkali metals are silver-white. However, relativistic effects are not very significant at Z = 55 for caesium (not far from Z = 47 for silver). The golden color of caesium comes from the decreasing frequency of light required to excite electrons of the alkali metals as the group is descended. For lithium through rubidium, this frequency is in the ultraviolet, but for caesium it reaches the blue-violet end of the visible spectrum; in other words, the plasmonic frequency of the alkali metals becomes lower from lithium to caesium. Thus caesium transmits and partially absorbs violet light preferentially, while other colors (having lower frequency) are reflected; hence it appears yellowish.

=== Lead–acid battery ===
Without relativity, lead (Z = 82) would be expected to behave much like tin (Z = 50), so tin–acid batteries should work just as well as the lead–acid batteries commonly used in cars. However, calculations show that about 10 V of the 12 V produced by a 6-cell lead–acid battery arises purely from relativistic effects, explaining why tin–acid batteries do not work.

=== Inert-pair effect ===
In Tl(I) (thallium), Pb(II) (lead), and Bi(III) (bismuth) complexes a 6s^{2} electron pair exists. The inert pair effect is the tendency of this pair of electrons to resist oxidation due to a relativistic contraction of the 6s orbital.

=== Other effects ===
Additional phenomena commonly caused by relativistic effects are the following:

- The effect of relativistic effects on metallophilic interactions is uncertain. Although Runeberg et al. (1999) calculated an attractive effect, Wan et al. (2021) instead calculated a repulsive effect.
- The stability of gold and platinum anions in compounds such as caesium auride.
- The slightly reduced reactivity of francium compared with caesium.
- About 10% of the lanthanide contraction is attributed to the relativistic mass of high-velocity electrons and the smaller Bohr radius that results.

== See also ==
- Ionization energy
- Electronegativity
- Electron affinity
- Quantum mechanics
- Relativistic quantum mechanics
