= Atomic radius =

Measure of the size of an atom

To see the data of individual elements' atomic radii, see Atomic radii of the elements (data page)

Diagram of a helium atom, showing the electron probability density as shades of gray.

The atomic radius of a chemical element is a measure of the size of its atom, usually the mean or typical distance from the center of the nucleus to the outermost isolated electron. Since the boundary is not a well-defined physical entity, there are various non-equivalent definitions of atomic radius. The five widely used definitions of atomic radius are covalent radius, Van der Waals radius, charge radius, ionic radius, and metallic radius. Typically, because of the difficulty to isolate atoms in order to measure their radii separately, the atomic radius is measured in a chemically bonded state; however, theoretical calculations are simpler when considering atoms in isolation. The dependencies on environment, probe, and state lead to a multiplicity of definitions.

Depending on the definition, the term may apply to atoms in condensed matter, covalently bonding in molecules, or in ionized and excited states; and its value may be obtained through experimental measurements, or computed from theoretical models. The value of the radius may depend on the atom's state and context.

Electrons do not have definite orbits nor sharply defined ranges. Rather, their positions must be described as probability distributions that taper off gradually as one moves away from the nucleus, without a sharp cutoff; these are referred to as atomic orbitals or electron clouds. Moreover, in condensed matter and molecules, the electron clouds of the atoms usually overlap to some extent, and some of the electrons may roam over a large region encompassing two or more atoms.

Under most definitions the radii of isolated neutral atoms range between 30 and 300 pm (trillionths of a meter), or between 0.3 and 3 ångströms. Therefore, the radius of an atom is more than 10,000 times the radius of its nucleus (1–10 fm), and less than 1/1000 of the wavelength of visible light (400–700 nm).

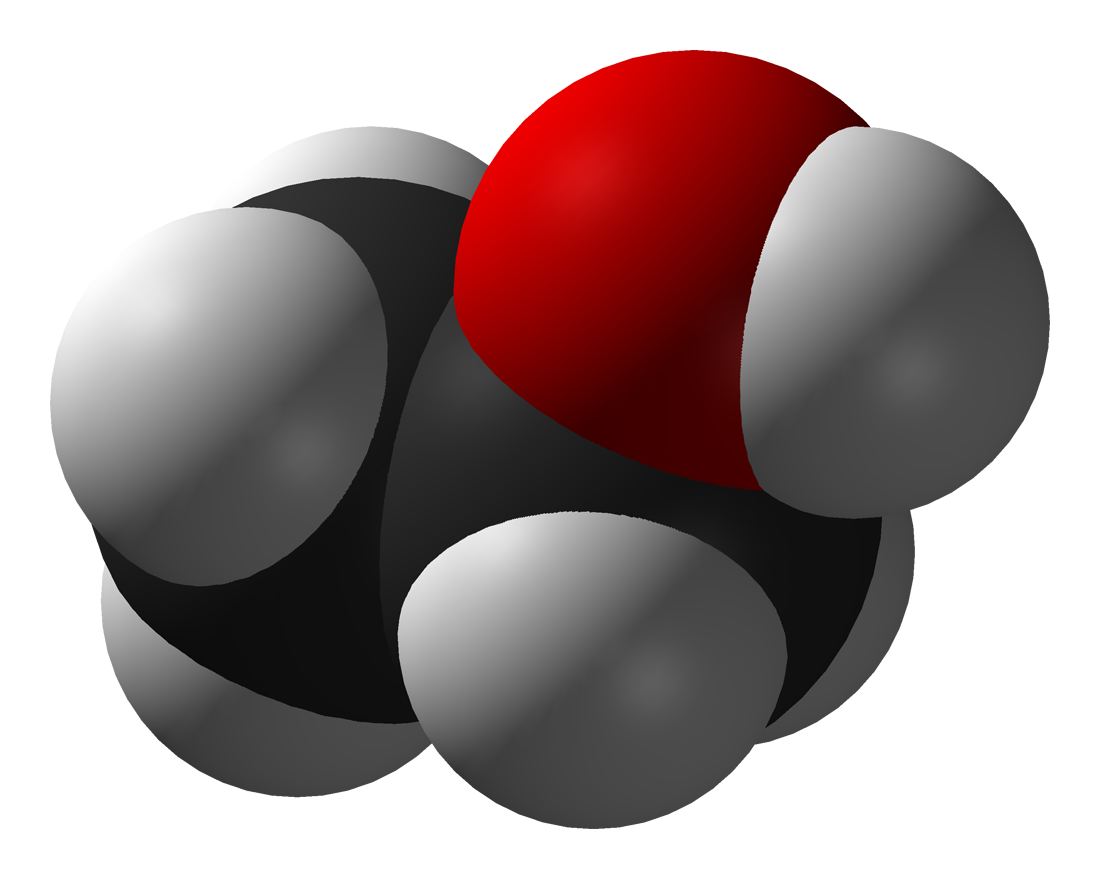
The approximate shape of a molecule of ethanol, CH_{3}CH_{2}OH. Each atom is modeled by a sphere with the element's Van der Waals radius.

For many purposes, atoms can be modeled as spheres. This is only a crude approximation, but it can provide quantitative explanations and predictions for many phenomena, such as the density of liquids and solids, the diffusion of fluids through molecular sieves, the arrangement of atoms and ions in crystals, and the size and shape of molecules.

== History ==
The first to estimate the radius of an atom was Johann Chrysostom Magnenus in 1646. He was at Mass and noticed the smell of incense permeating the church. He knew the size of the incense and estimated the size of the church. He presumed that he could detect the incense if one atom was in each nostril. He also presumed that the incense was distributed homogenously throughout the church. With these assumptions he was able to estimate the size of an atom to be about 10 to the power of −24 cubic metres. (The units he used have been converted to metric to make comparisons with later estimates easier.) Taking the cube root this gives an estimate of the atomic radius to be about 10 to the power of −8 metres. This is somewhat larger than current estimates but given the assumptions made in the calculation is very good. These calculations were published in his work Democritus reviviscens sive de atomis.

The concept of atomic radius was preceded in the 19th century by the concept of atomic volume, a relative measure of how much space would on average an atom occupy in a given solid or liquid material. By the end of the century this term was also used in an absolute sense, as a molar volume divided by Avogadro constant. Such a volume is different for different crystalline forms even of the same compound, but physicists used it for rough, order-of-magnitude estimates of the atomic size, getting 10^{−8}–10^{−7} cm for copper.

The earliest estimates of the atomic size was made by opticians in the 1830s, particularly Cauchy, who developed models of light dispersion assuming a lattice of connected "molecules". In 1857 Clausius developed a gas-kinetic model which included the equation for mean free path. In the 1870s it was used to estimate gas molecule sizes, as well as an aforementioned comparison with visible light wavelength and an estimate from the thickness of soap bubble film at which its contractile force rapidly diminishes. By 1900, various estimates of mercury atom diameter averaged around 275±20 pm (modern estimates give 300±10 pm, see below).

In 1920, shortly after it had become possible to determine the sizes of atoms using X-ray crystallography, it was suggested that all atoms of the same element have the same radii. However, in 1923, when more crystal data had become available, it was found that the approximation of an atom as a sphere does not necessarily hold when comparing the same atom in different crystal structures.

== Definitions ==
Widely used definitions of atomic radius include:

- Van der Waals radius: In the simplest definition, half the minimum distance between the nuclei of two atoms of the element that are not otherwise bound by covalent or metallic interactions. The Van der Waals radius may be defined even for elements (such as metals) in which Van der Waals forces are dominated by other interactions. Because Van der Waals interactions arise through quantum fluctuations of the atomic polarisation, the polarisability (which can usually be measured or calculated more easily) may be used to define the Van der Waals radius indirectly.
- Ionic radius: the nominal radius of the ions of an element in a specific ionization state, deduced from the spacing of atomic nuclei in crystalline salts that include that ion. In principle, the spacing between two adjacent oppositely charged ions (the length of the ionic bond between them) should equal the sum of their ionic radii.
- Covalent radius: the nominal radius of the atoms of an element when covalently bound to other atoms, as deduced from the separation between the atomic nuclei in molecules. In principle, the distance between two atoms that are bound to each other in a molecule (the length of that covalent bond) should equal the sum of their covalent radii.
- Metallic radius: the nominal radius of atoms of an element when joined to other atoms by metallic bonds.
- Bohr radius: the radius of the lowest-energy electron orbit predicted by Bohr model of the atom (1913). It is only applicable to atoms and ions with a single electron, such as hydrogen, singly ionized helium, and positronium. Although the model itself is now obsolete, the Bohr radius for the hydrogen atom is still regarded as an important physical constant, because it is equivalent to the quantum-mechanical most probable distance of the electron from the nucleus.

== Empirically measured atomic radius ==
The following table shows empirically measured covalent radii for the elements, as published by J. C. Slater in 1964. The values are in picometers (pm or 1×10^{−12} m), with an accuracy of about 5 pm. The shade of the box ranges from red to yellow as the radius increases; gray indicates lack of data.

Group (column)	1	2		3	4	5	6	7	8	9	10	11	12	13	14	15	16	17	18
Period (row)
1	H 25																		He
2	Li; 145	Be; 105												B 85	C 70	N 65	O 60	F 50	Ne
3	Na; 180	Mg; 150												Al; 125	Si; 110	P 100	S 100	Cl; 100	Ar
4	K 220	Ca; 180		Sc; 160	Ti; 140	V 135	Cr; 140	Mn; 140	Fe; 140	Co; 135	Ni; 135	Cu; 135	Zn; 135	Ga; 130	Ge; 125	As; 115	Se; 115	Br; 115	Kr
5	Rb; 235	Sr; 200		Y 180	Zr; 155	Nb; 145	Mo; 145	Tc; 135	Ru; 130	Rh; 135	Pd; 140	Ag; 160	Cd; 155	In; 155	Sn; 145	Sb; 145	Te; 140	I 140	Xe
6	Cs; 260	Ba; 215	*	Lu; 175	Hf; 155	Ta; 145	W 135	Re; 135	Os; 130	Ir; 135	Pt; 135	Au; 135	Hg; 150	Tl; 190	Pb; 180	Bi; 160	Po; 190	At	Rn
7	Fr	Ra; 215	**	Lr	Rf	Db	Sg	Bh	Hs	Mt	Ds	Rg	Cn	Nh	Fl	Mc	Lv	Ts	Og
			*	La; 195	Ce; 185	Pr; 185	Nd; 185	Pm; 185	Sm; 185	Eu; 185	Gd; 180	Tb; 175	Dy; 175	Ho; 175	Er; 175	Tm; 175	Yb; 175
			**	Ac; 195	Th; 180	Pa; 180	U 175	Np; 175	Pu; 175	Am; 175	Cm	Bk	Cf	Es	Fm	Md	No

== Explanation of the general trends ==
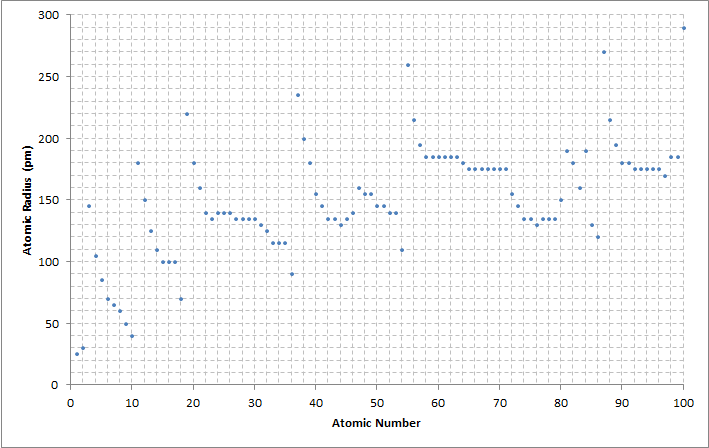
A graph comparing the atomic radius of elements with atomic numbers 1–100. Accuracy of ±5 pm.

Electrons in atoms fill electron shells from the lowest available energy level. As a consequence of the Aufbau principle, each new period begins with the first two elements filling the next unoccupied s-orbital. Because an atom's s-orbital electrons are typically farthest from the nucleus, this results in a significant increase in atomic radius with the first elements of each period.

The atomic radius of each element generally decreases across each period due to an increasing number of protons, since an increase in the number of protons increases the attractive force acting on the atom's electrons. The greater attraction draws the electrons closer to the protons, decreasing the size of the atom. Down each group, the atomic radius of each element typically increases because there are more occupied electron energy levels and therefore a greater distance between protons and electrons.

The increasing nuclear charge is partly counterbalanced by the increasing number of electrons—a phenomenon that is known as shielding—which explains why the size of atoms usually increases down each column despite an increase in attractive force from the nucleus. Electron shielding causes the attraction of an atom's nucleus on its electrons to decrease, so electrons occupying higher energy states farther from the nucleus experience reduced attractive force, increasing the size of the atom. However, elements in the 5d-block (lutetium to mercury) are much smaller than this trend predicts due to the weak shielding of the 4f-subshell. This phenomenon is known as the lanthanide contraction. A similar phenomenon exists for actinides; however, the general instability of transuranic elements makes measurements for the remainder of the 5f-block difficult and for transactinides nearly impossible. Finally, for sufficiently heavy elements, the atomic radius may be decreased by relativistic effects. This is a consequence of electrons near the strongly charged nucleus traveling at a sufficient fraction of the speed of light to gain a nontrivial amount of mass.

The following table summarizes the main phenomena that influence the atomic radius of an element:

Factor	Principle	increase in...	tend to	effect on radius
electron shells	quantum mechanics	principal and azimuthal quantum numbers	increase down each column	increases the atomic radius
nuclear charge	attractive force acting on electrons by protons in nucleus	atomic number	increase along each period (left to right)	decreases the atomic radius
shielding	repulsive force acting on outermost shell electrons by inner electrons	number of electrons in inner shells	reduce the effect of nuclear charge	increases the atomic radius

=== Lanthanide contraction ===
The electrons in the 4f-subshell, which is progressively filled from lanthanum (Z = 57) to ytterbium (Z = 70), are not particularly effective at shielding the increasing nuclear charge from the sub-shells further out. The elements immediately following the lanthanides have atomic radii which are smaller than would be expected and which are almost identical to the atomic radii of the elements immediately above them. Hence lutetium is in fact slightly smaller than yttrium, hafnium has virtually the same atomic radius (and chemistry) as zirconium, and tantalum has an atomic radius similar to niobium, and so forth. The effect of the lanthanide contraction is noticeable up to platinum (Z = 78), after which it is masked by a relativistic effect known as the inert-pair effect.

Due to lanthanide contraction, the 5 following observations can be drawn:

1. The size of Ln^{3+} ions regularly decreases with atomic number. According to Fajans' rules, decrease in size of Ln^{3+} ions increases the covalent character and decreases the basic character between Ln^{3+} and OH^{−} ions in Ln(OH)_{3}, to the point that Yb(OH)_{3} and Lu(OH)_{3} can dissolve with difficulty in hot concentrated NaOH. Hence the order of size of Ln^{3+} is given:
  La^{3+} > Ce^{3+} > ..., ... > Lu^{3+}.
2. There is a regular decrease in their ionic radii.
3. There is a regular decrease in their tendency to act as a reducing agent, with an increase in atomic number.
4. The second and third rows of d-block transition elements are quite close in properties.
5. Consequently, these elements occur together in natural minerals and are difficult to separate.

=== d-block contraction ===
The d-block contraction is less pronounced than the lanthanide contraction but arises from a similar cause. In this case, it is the poor shielding capacity of the 3d-electrons which affects the atomic radii and chemistries of the elements immediately following the first row of the transition metals, from gallium (Z = 31) to bromine (Z = 35).

== Calculated atomic radius ==
The following table shows atomic radii computed from theoretical models, as published by Enrico Clementi and others in 1967. The values are in picometres (pm).

Group (column)	1	2		3	4	5	6	7	8	9	10	11	12	13	14	15	16	17	18
Period (row)
1	H 53																		He; 31
2	Li; 167	Be; 112												B 87	C 67	N 56	O 48	F 42	Ne; 38
3	Na; 190	Mg; 145												Al; 118	Si; 111	P 98	S 88	Cl; 79	Ar; 71
4	K 243	Ca; 194		Sc; 184	Ti; 176	V 171	Cr; 166	Mn; 161	Fe; 156	Co; 152	Ni; 149	Cu; 145	Zn; 142	Ga; 136	Ge; 125	As; 114	Se; 103	Br; 94	Kr; 88
5	Rb; 265	Sr; 219		Y 212	Zr; 206	Nb; 198	Mo; 190	Tc; 183	Ru; 178	Rh; 173	Pd; 169	Ag; 165	Cd; 161	In; 156	Sn; 145	Sb; 133	Te; 123	I 115	Xe; 108
6	Cs; 298	Ba; 253	*	Lu; 217	Hf; 208	Ta; 200	W 193	Re; 188	Os; 185	Ir; 180	Pt; 177	Au; 174	Hg; 171	Tl; 156	Pb; 154	Bi; 143	Po; 135	At; 127	Rn; 120
7	Fr	Ra	**	Lr	Rf	Db	Sg	Bh	Hs	Mt	Ds	Rg	Cn	Nh	Fl	Mc	Lv	Ts	Og
			*	La; 226	Ce; 210	Pr; 247	Nd; 206	Pm; 205	Sm; 238	Eu; 231	Gd; 233	Tb; 225	Dy; 228	Ho; 226	Er; 226	Tm; 222	Yb; 222
			**	Ac	Th	Pa	U	Np	Pu	Am	Cm	Bk	Cf	Es	Fm	Md	No

== See also ==
- Atomic radii of the elements (data page)
- Chemical bond
- Covalent radius
- Bond length
- Steric hindrance
- Kinetic diameter
