= Properties of metals, metalloids and nonmetals =

Comparison of the properties of the three main categories in the periodic table

The chemical elements can be broadly divided into metals, metalloids, and nonmetals according to their shared physical and chemical properties. All elemental metals have a shiny appearance (at least when freshly polished); are good conductors of heat and electricity; form alloys with other metallic elements; and have at least one basic oxide. Metalloids are metallic-looking, often brittle solids that are either semiconductors or semimetals, and have amphoteric or weakly acidic oxides. Typical elemental nonmetals have a dull, coloured or colourless appearance; are often brittle when solid; are poor conductors of heat and electricity; and have acidic oxides. Most or some elements in each category share a range of other properties; a few elements have properties that are either anomalous given their category, or otherwise extraordinary.

== Properties ==
=== Metals ===
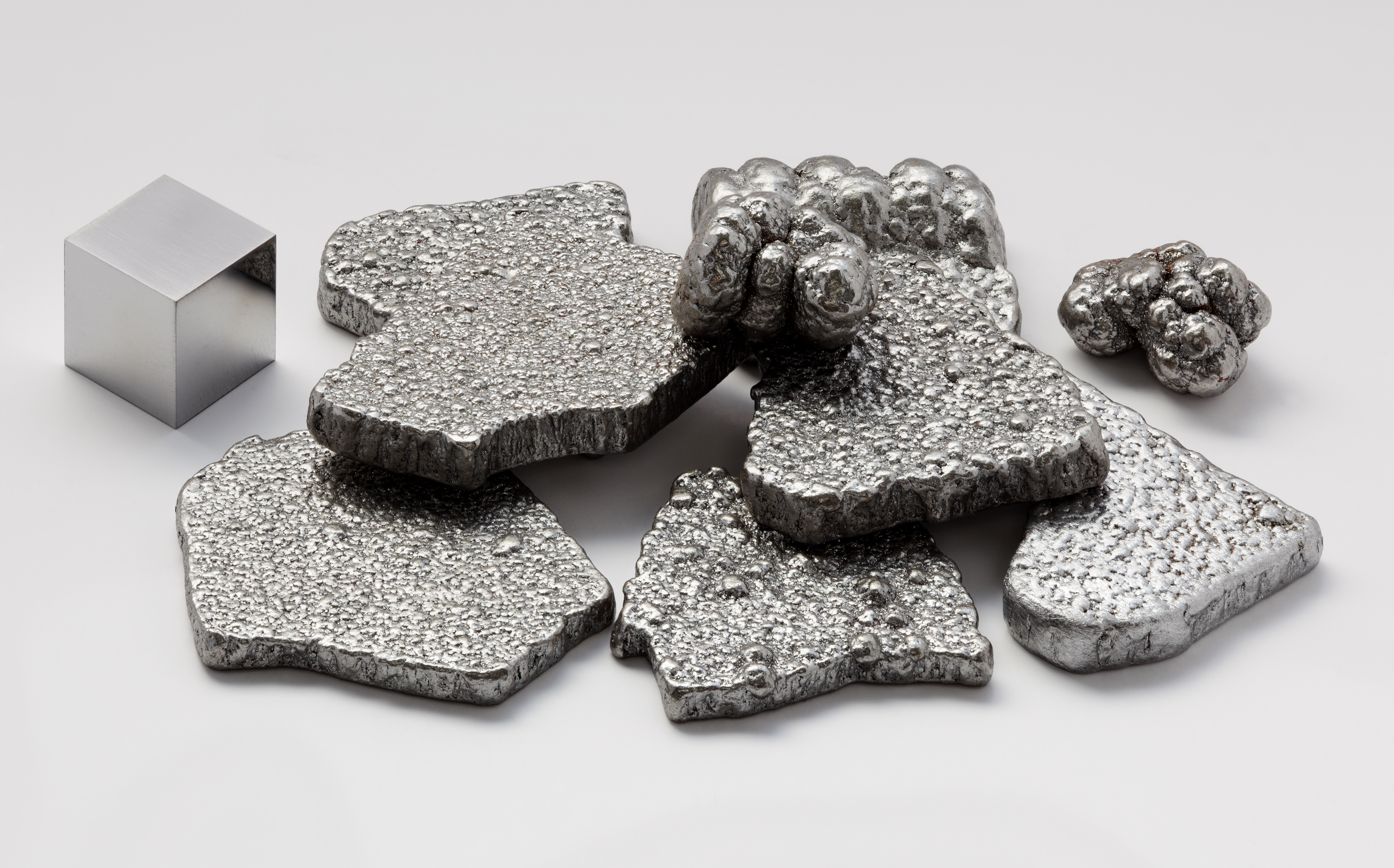
Pure (99.97%+) iron chips, electrolytically refined, accompanied by a high-purity (99.9999% = 6N) 1 cm^{3} cube

Elemental metals appear lustrous (beneath any patina); form compounds (alloys) when combined with other elements; tend to lose or share electrons when they react with other substances; and each forms at least one predominantly basic oxide.

Most metals are silvery looking, high density metals which can be plastically deformed solids with good electrical and thermal conductivity, closely packed structures, low ionisation energies and electronegativities, and are found naturally in combined states.

Some metals appear coloured (Cu, Cs, Au), have low densities (e.g. Be, Al) or very high melting points (e.g. W, Nb), are liquids at or near room temperature (e.g. Hg, Ga), are brittle (e.g. Os, Bi), not easily machined (e.g. Ti, Re), or are noble (hard to oxidise, e.g. Au, Pt), or have nonmetallic structures (Mn and Ga are structurally analogous to, respectively, white P and I).

Metals comprise the large majority of the elements, and can be subdivided into several different categories. From left to right in the periodic table, these categories include the highly reactive alkali metals; the less-reactive alkaline earth metals, lanthanides, and radioactive actinides; the archetypal transition metals; and the physically and chemically weak post-transition metals. Specialized subcategories such as the refractory metals and the noble metals also exist.

=== Metalloids ===
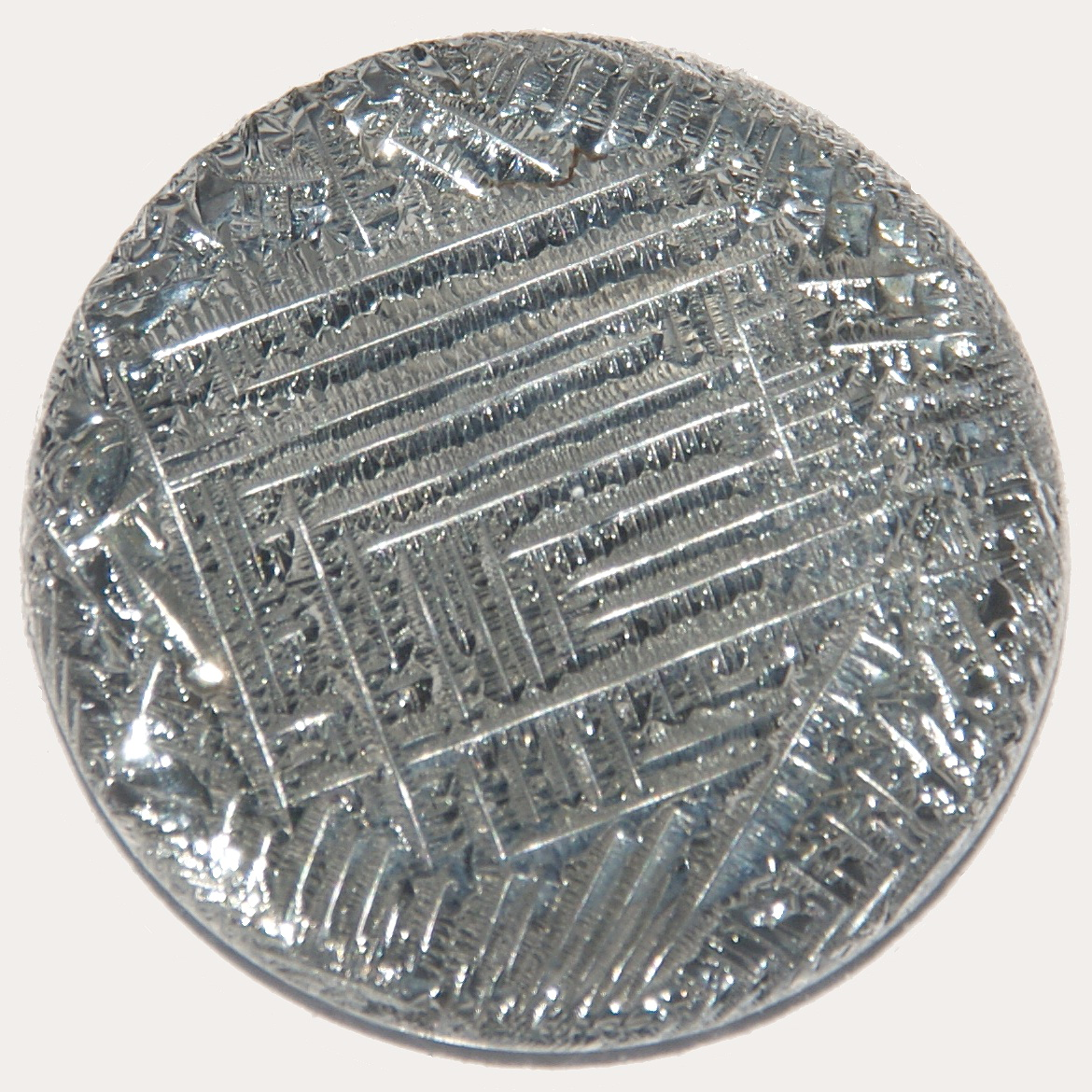
Tellurium, described by Dmitri Mendeleev as forming a transition between metals and nonmetals

Metalloids are metallic-looking often brittle solids; tend to share electrons when they react with other substances; have weakly acidic or amphoteric oxides; and are usually found naturally in combined states.

Most are semiconductors or semimetals, moderate thermal conductors, and have structures that are more open than those of most metals.

Some metalloids (As, Sb) conduct electricity like metals.

The metalloids, as the smallest major category of elements, are not subdivided further.

=== Nonmetals ===
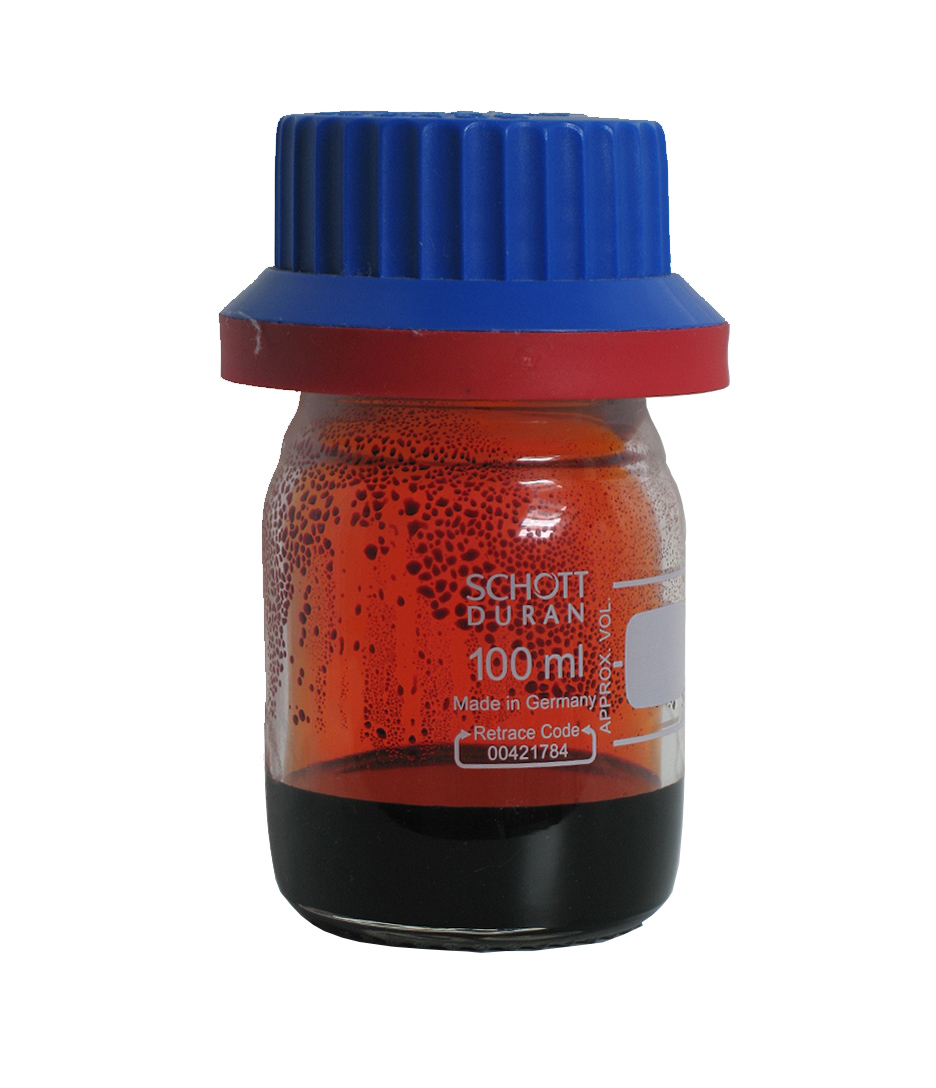
25 ml of bromine, a dark red-brown liquid at room temperature

Nonmetallic elements often have open structures; tend to gain or share electrons when they react with other substances; and do not form distinctly basic oxides.

Many are gases at room temperature; have relatively low densities; are poor electrical and thermal conductors; have relatively high ionisation energies and electronegativities; form acidic oxides; and are found naturally in uncombined states in large amounts.

Some nonmetals (black P, S, and Se) are brittle solids at room temperature (although each of these also have malleable, pliable or ductile allotropes).

From left to right in the periodic table, the nonmetals can be divided into the reactive nonmetals and the noble gases. The reactive nonmetals near the metalloids show some incipient metallic character, such as the metallic appearance of graphite, black phosphorus, selenium and iodine. The noble gases are almost completely inert.

== Comparison of properties ==
Physical and chemical properties (Note: At standard pressure and temperature, for the elements in their most thermodynamically stable forms, unless otherwise noted)
	Metals	Metalloids	Nonmetals
Form and structure			
Colour	nearly all are shiny and grey-white; Cu, Cs, Au: shiny and golden	shiny and grey-white	most are colourless or dull red, yellow, green, or intermediate shades; C, P, Se, I: shiny and grey-white
Reflectivity	intermediate to typically high	intermediate	zero or low (mostly) to intermediate
State of matter at STP	almost all solid; Rb, Cs, Fr, Ga, Hg: liquid at/near stp (Note: Copernicium is reported to be the only metal known to be a gas at room temperature.)	all solid	most are gases; C, P, S, Se, I: solid; Br: liquid
Density	generally high, with some exceptions such as the alkali metals	lower than nearby metals but higher than nearby nonmetals	often low
Deformability (as a solid)	most are ductile and malleable; some are brittle (Cr, Mn, Ga, Ru, W, Os, Bi) (Note: Whether polonium is ductile or brittle is unclear. It is predicted to be ductile based on its calculated elastic constants. It has a simple cubic crystalline structure. Such a structure has few slip systems and "leads to very low ductility and hence low fracture resistance".)	often brittle	often brittle; some (C, P, S, Se) have non-brittle forms (Note: Carbon as exfoliated (expanded) graphite, and as metre-long carbon nanotube wire; phosphorus as white phosphorus (soft as wax, pliable and can be cut with a knife, at room temperature); sulfur as plastic sulfur; and selenium as selenium wires.)
Poisson's ratio (Note: For polycrystalline forms of the elements unless otherwise noted. Determining Poisson's ratio accurately is a difficult proposition and there could be considerable uncertainty in some reported values.)	low to high (Note: Beryllium has the lowest known value (0.0476) among elemental metals; indium and thallium each have the highest known value (0.46). Around one third show a value ≥ 0.33.)	low to intermediate (Note: Boron 0.13; silicon 0.22; germanium 0.278; amorphous arsenic 0.27; antimony 0.25; tellurium ~0.2.)	low to intermediate (Note: Graphitic carbon 0.25; [diamond 0.0718]; black phosphorus 0.30; sulfur 0.287; amorphous selenium 0.32; amorphous iodine ~0.)
Crystalline structure at freezing point	most are hexagonal or cubic; Ga, U, Np: orthorhombic; In, Sn, Pa: tetragonal; Sm, Hg, Bi: rhombohedral; Pu: monoclinic	B, As, Sb: rhombohedral; Si, Ge: cubic; Te: hexagonal	H, He, C, N, Se: hexagonal; O, F, Ne, P, Ar, Kr, Xe, Rn: cubic; S, Cl, Br, I: orthorhombic
Packing & coordination number	close-packed crystal structures; high coordination numbers	relatively open crystal structures; medium coordination numbers	open structures; low coordination numbers
Atomic radius (calculated)	intermediate to very large; 112–298 pm, average 187	small to intermediate: B, Si, Ge, As, Sb, Te; 87–123 pm, average 115.5 pm	very small to intermediate; 31–120 pm, average 76.4 pm
Allotropes (Note: At atmospheric pressure, for elements with known structures)	around half form allotropes; one (Sn) has a metalloid-like allotrope (grey Sn, which forms below 13.2 °C)	all or nearly all form allotropes; some (e.g. red B, yellow As) are more nonmetallic in nature	some form allotropes; some (e.g. graphitic C, black P, grey Se) are more metalloidal or metallic in nature
Electron-related
Periodic table block	s, p, d, f	p	s, p
Outer s and p electrons	few in number (1–3); except 0 (Pd); 4 (Sn, Pb, Fl); 5 (Bi); 6 (Po)	medium number (3–7)	high number (4–8); except 1 (H); 2 (He)
Electron bands: (valence, conduction)	nearly all have substantial band overlap; Bi: has slight band overlap (semimetal)	most have narrow band gap (semiconductors); As, Sb are semimetals	most have wide band gap (insulators); C (graphite): a semimetal; P (black), Se, I: semiconductors
Electron behaviour	"free" electrons (facilitating electrical and thermal conductivity)	valence electrons less freely delocalized; considerable covalent bonding present; have Goldhammer-Herzfeld criterion (Note: The Goldhammer-Herzfeld criterion is a ratio that compares the force holding an individual atom's valence electrons in place with the forces, acting on the same electrons, arising from interactions between the atoms in the solid or liquid element. When the interatomic forces are greater than or equal to the atomic force, valence electron itinerancy is indicated. Metallic behaviour is then predicted. Otherwise nonmetallic behaviour is anticipated. The Goldhammer-Herzfeld criterion is based on classical arguments. It nevertheless offers a relatively simple first order rationalization for the occurrence of metallic character among the elements.) ratios straddling unity	no, few, or directionally confined "free" electrons (generally hampering electrical and thermal conductivity)
Electrical conductivity	good to high (Note: Metals have electrical conductivity values of from 6.9 × 10^{3} S•cm^{−1} for manganese to 6.3 × 10^{5} for silver.)	intermediate to good (Note: Metalloids have electrical conductivity values of from 1.5 × 10^{−6} S•cm^{−1} for boron to 3.9 × 10^{4} for arsenic. If selenium is included as a metalloid the applicable conductivity range would start from ~10^{−9} to 10^{−12} S•cm^{−1}.)	poor to good (Note: Nonmetals have electrical conductivity values of from ~10^{−18} S•cm^{−1} for the elemental gases to 3 × 10^{4} in graphite.)
... as a liquid	falls gradually as temperature rises (Note: Mott and Davis note however that 'liquid europium has a negative temperature coefficient of resistance' i.e. that conductivity increases with rising temperature)	most behave like metals	increases as temperature rises
Thermodynamics
Thermal conductivity	medium to high	mostly intermediate; Si is high	almost negligible to very high
Temperature coefficient of resistance (Note: At or near room temperature)	nearly all positive (Pu is negative)	negative (B, Si, Ge, Te) or positive (As, Sb)	nearly all negative (C, as graphite, is positive in the direction of its planes)
Melting point	mostly high	mostly high	mostly low
Melting behaviour	volume generally expands	some contract, unlike (most) metals	volume generally expands
Enthalpy of fusion	low to high	intermediate to very high	very low to low (except C: very high)
Elemental chemistry
Overall behaviour	metallic	nonmetallic	nonmetallic
Ion formation	tend to form cations	some tendency to form anions in water; solution chemistry dominated by formation and reactions of oxyanions	tend to form anions
Bonds	seldom form covalent compounds	form salts as well as covalent compounds	form many covalent compounds
Oxidation number	nearly always positive	positive or negative	positive or negative
Ionization energy	relatively low	intermediate	high
Electronegativity	usually low	close to 2, i.e., 1.9–2.2 (Note: Chedd defines metalloids as having electronegativity values of 1.8 to 2.2 (Allred-Rochow scale). He included boron, silicon, germanium, arsenic, antimony, tellurium, polonium and astatine in this category. In reviewing Chedd's work, Adler described this choice as arbitrary, given other elements have electronegativities in this range, including copper, silver, phosphorus, mercury, and bismuth. He went on to suggest defining a metalloid simply as, 'a semiconductor or semimetal' and 'to have included the interesting materials bismuth and selenium in the book'.)	high
Combined form chemistry
With metals	form alloys	can form alloys	form ionic or interstitial compounds
With carbon	carbides and organometallic compounds	same as metals	carbon-nonmetal (e.g. CO_{2}, CS_{2}) (Note: Phosphorus is known to form a carbide in thin films.) or organic (e.g. CH_{4}, C_{6}H_{12}O_{6}) compounds
With hydrogen (hydrides)	ionic, with alkali metals, alkaline earth metals; metallic, with transition metals; covalent, with post-transition metals	covalent, volatile hydrides	covalent, gaseous or liquid hydrides
With oxygen (oxides)	nearly all solid (Mn_{2}O_{7} is a liquid); very few glass formers; lower oxides: ionic and basic; higher oxides: more covalent, acidic	solid; glass formers (B, Si, Ge, As, Sb, Te); polymeric in structure; tend to be amphoteric or weakly acidic	solid, liquid or gaseous; few glass formers (P, S, Se); covalent, acidic
With sulfur (sulfates)	do form (Note: See, for example, the sulfates of the transition metals, the lanthanides and the actinides.) (Note: Sulfates of osmium have not been characterized with any great degree of certainty.)	most form (Note: Common metalloids: Boron is reported to be capable of forming an oxysulfate (BO)_{2}SO_{4}, a bisulfate B(HSO_{4})_{3} and a sulfate B_{2}(SO_{4})_{3}. The existence of a sulfate has been disputed. In light of the existence of silicon phosphate, a silicon sulfate might also exist. Germanium forms an unstable sulfate Ge(SO_{4})_{2} (d 200 °C). Arsenic forms oxide sulfates As_{2}O(SO_{4})_{2} (= As_{2}O_{3}.2SO_{3}) and As_{2}(SO_{4})_{3} (= As_{2}O_{3}.3SO_{3}). Antimony forms a sulfate Sb_{2}(SO_{4})_{3} and an oxysulfate (SbO)_{2}SO_{4}. Tellurium forms an oxide sulfate Te_{2}O_{3}(SO)_{4}. Less common: Polonium forms a sulfate Po(SO_{4})_{2}. It has been suggested that the astatine cation forms a weak complex with sulfate ions in acidic solutions.)	some form (Note: Hydrogen forms hydrogen sulfate H_{2}SO_{4}. Carbon forms (a blue) graphite hydrogen sulfate C^{+}_{24}HSO^{–}_{4} • 2.4H_{2}SO_{4}. Nitrogen forms nitrosyl hydrogen sulfate (NO)HSO_{4} and nitronium (or nitryl) hydrogen sulfate (NO_{2})HSO_{4}. There are indications of a basic sulfate of selenium SeO_{2}.SO_{3} or SeO(SO_{4}). Iodine forms a polymeric yellow sulfate (IO)_{2}SO_{4}.)
With halogens (halides, esp. chlorides) (see also)	typically ionic, involatile; generally insoluble in organic solvents; mostly water-soluble (not hydrolysed); more covalent, volatile, and susceptible to hydrolysis (Note: layer-lattice types often reversibly so) and organic solvents with higher halogens and weaker metals	covalent, volatile; usually dissolve in organic solvents; partly or completely hydrolysed; some reversibly hydrolysed	covalent, volatile; usually dissolve in organic solvents; generally completely or extensively hydrolyzed; not always susceptible to hydrolysis if parent nonmetal at maximum covalency for period e.g. CF_{4}, SF_{6} (then nil reaction)
Environmental chemistry
Molar composition of Earth's ecosphere (Note: Based on a table of the elemental composition of the biosphere, and lithosphere (crust, atmosphere, and seawater) in Georgievskii, and the masses of the crust and hydrosphere give in Lide and Frederikse. The mass of the biosphere is negligible, having a mass of about one billionth that of the lithosphere. "The oceans constitute about 98 percent of the hydrosphere, and thus the average composition of the hydrosphere is, for all practical purposes, that of seawater.")	about 14%, mostly Al, Na, Mg, Ca, Fe, K	about 17%, mostly Si	about 69%, mostly O, H
Primary form on Earth	most occur in combined states, as carbonates, silicates, phosphates, oxides, sulfides, or halides; some (e.g. Au, Cu, Ag, Pt) occur in free or uncombined states	all occur in combined states, as borates, silicates, sulfides, or tellurides	elemental C, N, O, S, noble gases are plentiful; H, (Note: Hydrogen gas is produced by some bacteria and algae and is a natural component of flatus. It can be found in the Earth's atmosphere at a concentration of 1 part per million by volume.) F (Note: Fluorine can be found in its elemental form, as an occlusion in the mineral antozonite), Se occur primarily in compounds; P, Cl, Br, I occur only in compounds, as phosphates, oxides, selenides or halides
Required by mammals	large amounts needed: Na, Mg, K, Ca; trace amounts needed of some others	trace amounts needed: B, Si, As	large amounts needed: H, C, N, O, P, S, Cl; trace amounts needed: Se, Br, I, possibly F; only noble gases not needed
Composition of the human body, by weight	about 1.5% Ca	trace amounts of B, Si, Ge, As, Sb, Te	about 97% O, C, H, N, P; others detectable except noble gases
