= Nonmetal =

Category of chemical elements

A periodic table extract highlighting nonmetals
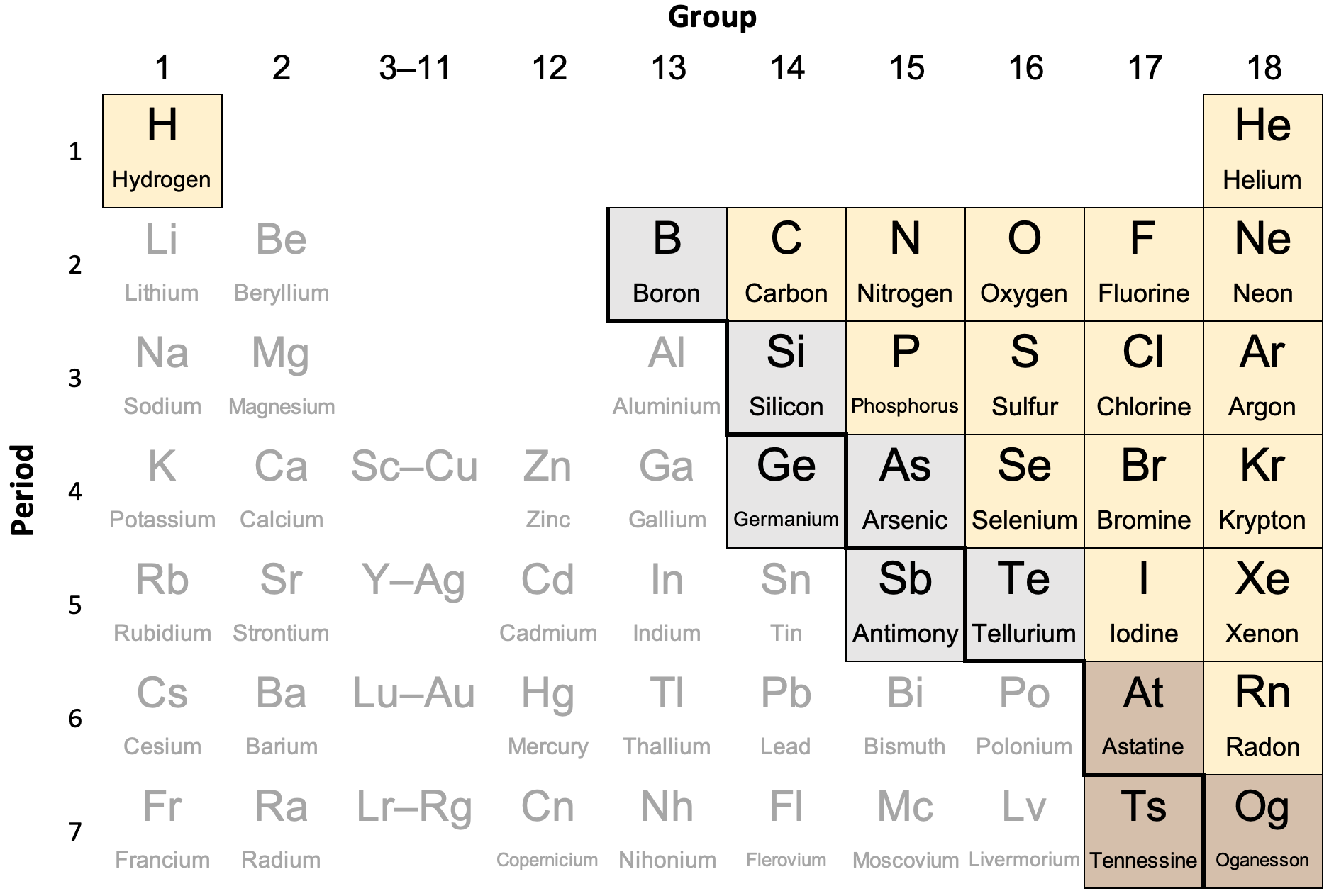

17 always/usually considered nonmetals
6 metalloids, sometimes considered nonmetals
3 status as nonmetal or metal unconfirmed

In the context of the periodic table, a nonmetal is a chemical element that mostly lacks distinctive metallic properties. Physically, nonmetals range from colorless gases such as hydrogen to lustrous crystalline solids such as iodine. They are usually less dense than metals and are often poor conductors of heat and electricity. Chemically, they have moderate to very high electronegativity—a tendency to attract electrons in a chemical bond—and their oxides tend to be acidic.

Seventeen elements are widely recognized as nonmetals. Additionally, some or all of six borderline elements (metalloids) are sometimes counted as nonmetals.

The two lightest nonmetals, hydrogen and helium, together make up about 98% of the mass of ordinary matter in the observable universe. Five nonmetallic elements—hydrogen, carbon, nitrogen, oxygen, and silicon—make up the bulk of Earth’s atmosphere, oceans, biosphere, and crust. Metals, however, are thought to constitute slightly more than half of Earth’s total mass.

Chemical compounds and alloys involving multiple elements including nonmetals are widespread. Industrial uses of nonmetals as the dominant component include in electronics, combustion, lubrication and machining.

Most nonmetallic elements were identified in the 18th and 19th centuries. While a distinction between metals and other minerals had existed since antiquity, a classification of chemical elements as metallic or nonmetallic emerged only in the late 18th century. Since then about twenty properties have been suggested as criteria for distinguishing nonmetals from metals. In contemporary research usage it is common to use a distinction between metal and not-a-metal based upon the electronic structure of the solids; the elements carbon, arsenic and antimony are then semimetals, a subclass of metals. The rest of the nonmetallic elements are insulators, some of which such as silicon and germanium can readily accommodate dopants that change their electrical conductivity leading to semiconducting behavior.

== Definition and applicable elements ==
Unless otherwise noted, this article describes the stable form of an element at or near standard temperature and pressure (STP). (Note: The most stable forms are: diatomic hydrogen H_{2}; β-rhombohedral boron; graphite for carbon; diatomic nitrogen N_{2}; diatomic oxygen O_{2}; tetrahedral silicon; black phosphorus; orthorhombic sulfur S_{8}; α-germanium; gray arsenic; gray selenium; gray antimony; gray tellurium; and diatomic iodine I_{2}. All other nonmetallic elements have only one stable form at STP.)

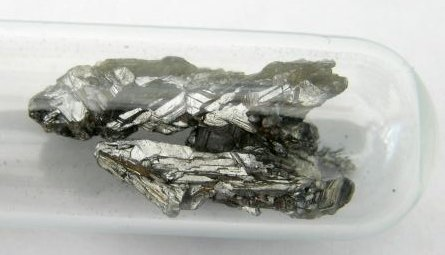
Arsenic (here sealed in a container to prevent tarnishing) is sometimes counted as a nonmetal. Although it has a lustrous appearance and is a reasonable conductor of heat and electricity, it is brittle, and its oxides show appreciable acidic character. Its chemistry is predominantly nonmetallic.

Nonmetallic chemical elements are often broadly defined as those that largely lack the characteristic properties of metals—namely lustre, malleability, good thermal and electrical conductivity (arising from their electronic band structure), and a general tendency to form basic oxides. There is no widely accepted precise definition based on the extent to which these metallic properties are lacking; any list of nonmetals is therefore open to debate and revision.

Fourteen elements are almost always recognized as nonmetals:

- Hydrogen
- Nitrogen
- Oxygen
- Sulfur
- Fluorine
- Chlorine
- Bromine
- Iodine
- Helium
- Neon
- Argon
- Krypton
- Xenon
- Radon

Three more are commonly classed as nonmetals, but some sources list them as "metalloids", a term which refers to elements intermediate between metals and nonmetals:

- Carbon
- Phosphorus
- Selenium

One or more of the six elements most commonly recognized as metalloids are sometimes instead counted as nonmetals:

- Boron
- Silicon
- Germanium
- Arsenic
- Antimony
- Tellurium

About 15–20% of the 118 known elements are thus classified as nonmetals. (Note: At higher temperatures and pressures the numbers of nonmetals can be called into question. For example, when germanium melts it changes from a semiconductor to a metallic conductor with an electrical conductivity similar to that of liquid mercury. At a high enough pressure, sodium (a metal) becomes a non-conducting insulator.)

== General properties ==
=== Physical ===
Nonmetals can be generally characterised by their variety in form and color, relatively low density and limited pliability, and generally low melting points and conductivity.

Nonmetals show considerable physical diversity, ranging from colourless gases to lustrous solids. Their physical states, densities, mechanical properties, phase-change temperatures, thermal and electrical conductivities, and electronic structures vary widely, largely because of differences in how their atoms or molecules are arranged and bonded. Compared with metals, however, they are generally less dense and, when solid, are brittle or crumbly rather than malleable or ductile.

Variety in form and color
of some nonmetallic elements

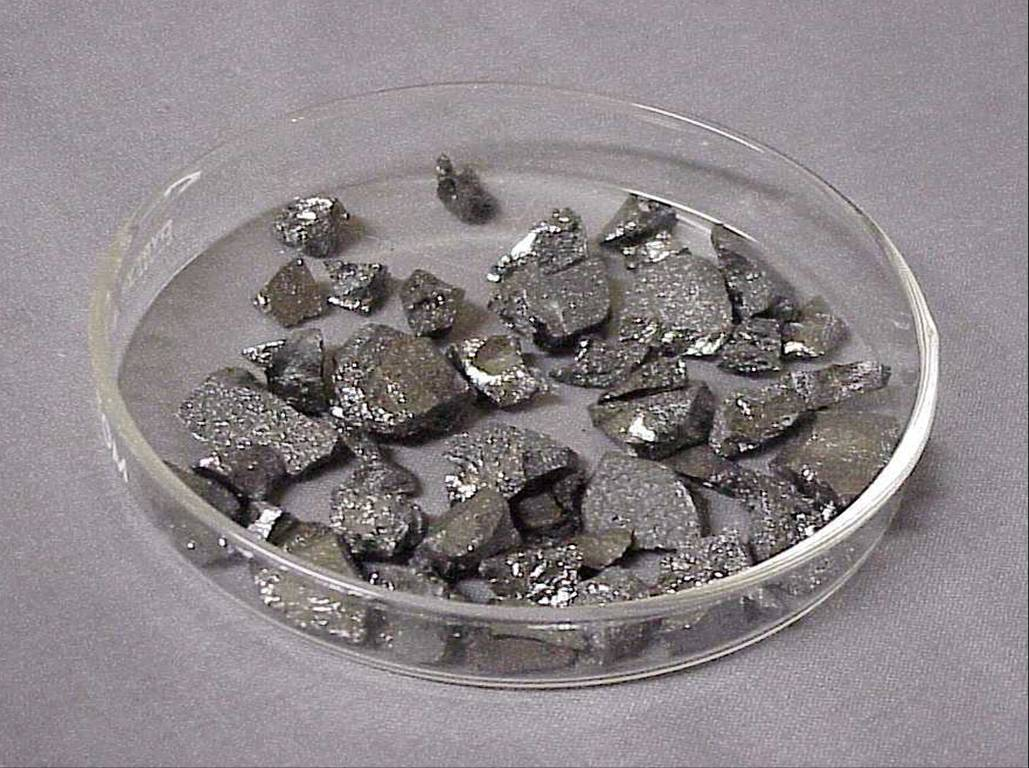
Boron
appears metallic

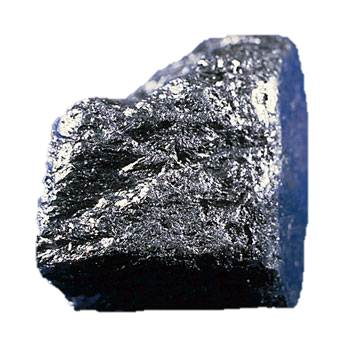
Carbon
appears metallic

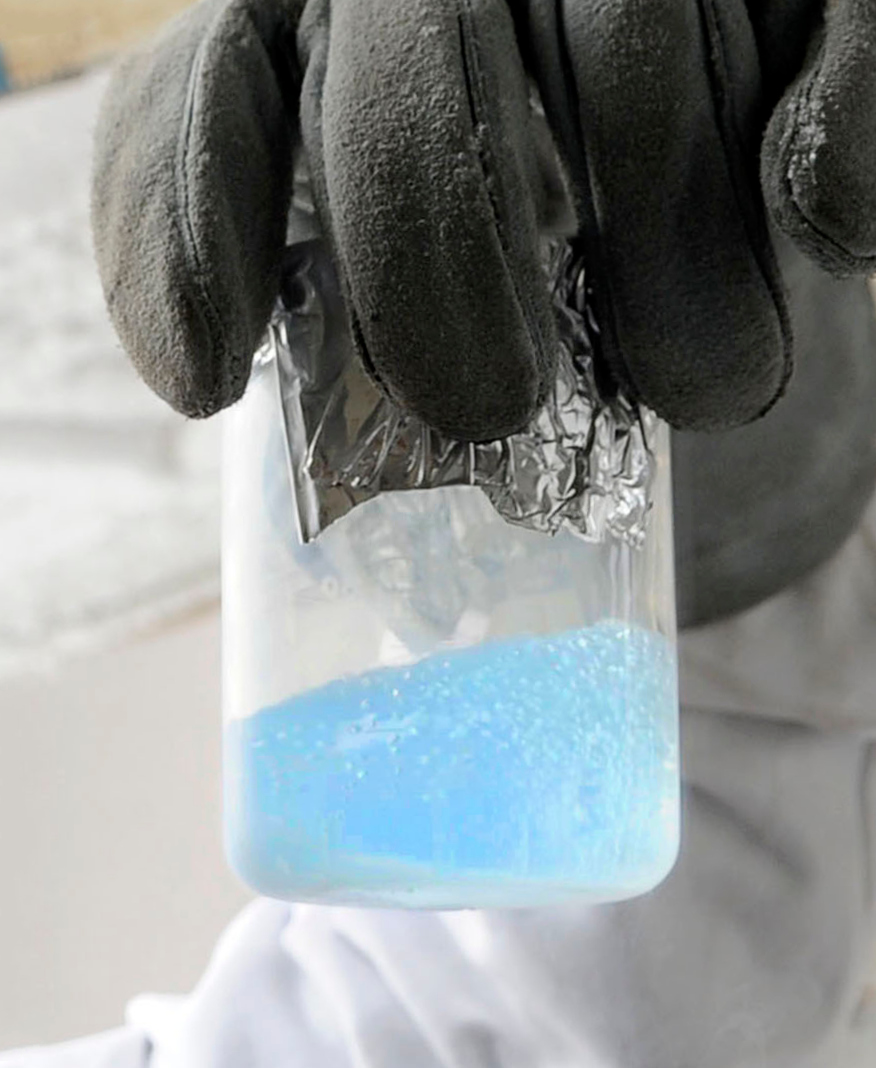
Oxygen when liquified turns pale blue

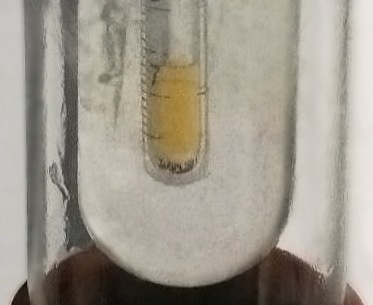
Fluorine in a cryogenic bath remains pale yellow

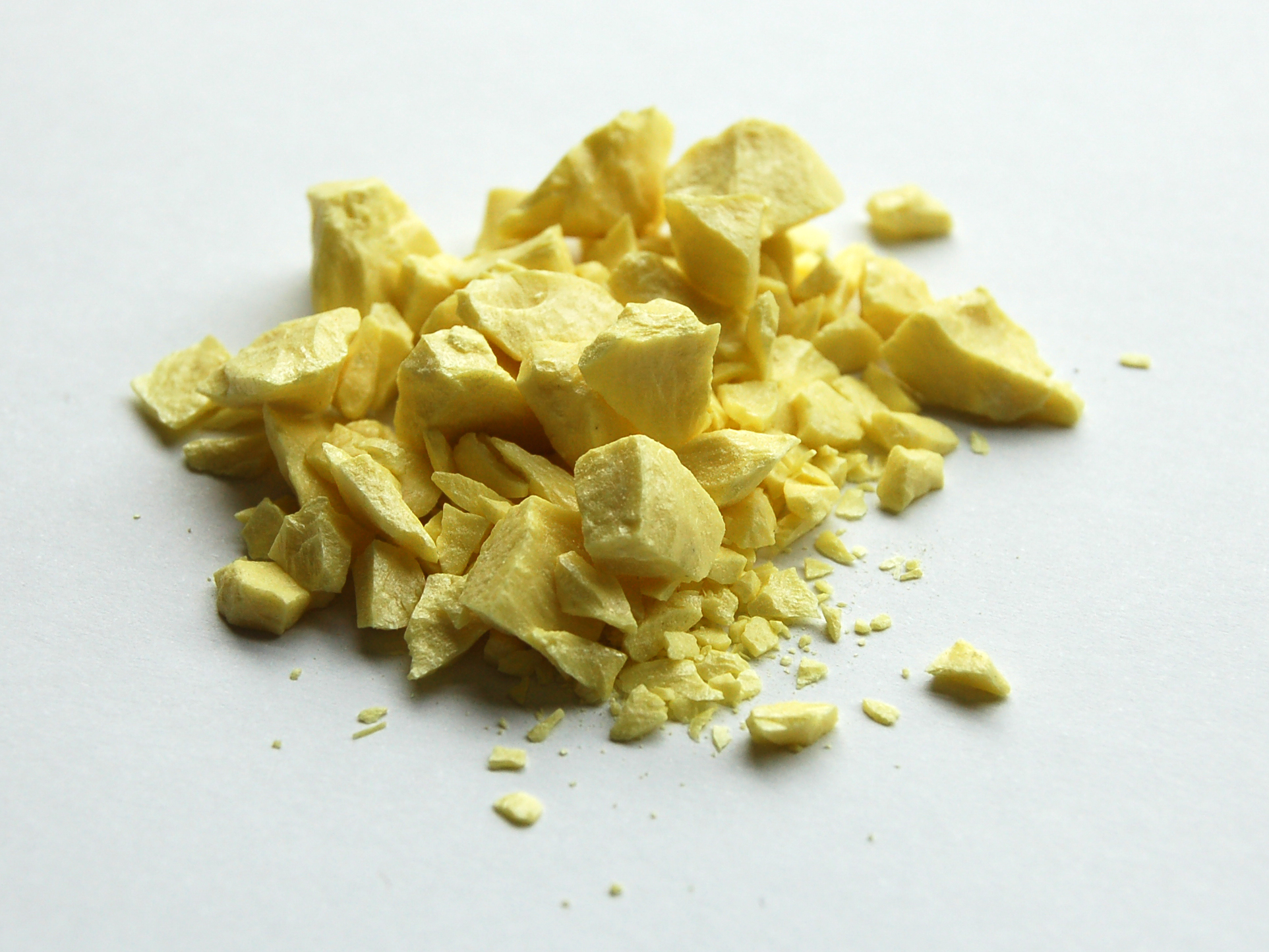
Sulfur as
yellow chunks

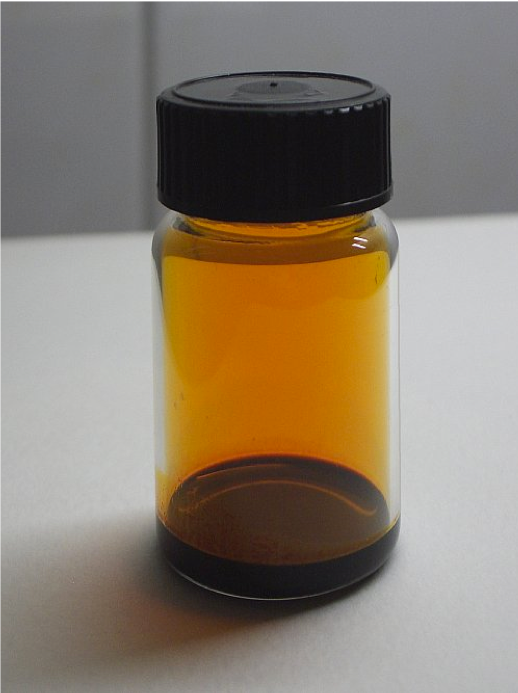
Bromine is
reddish brown

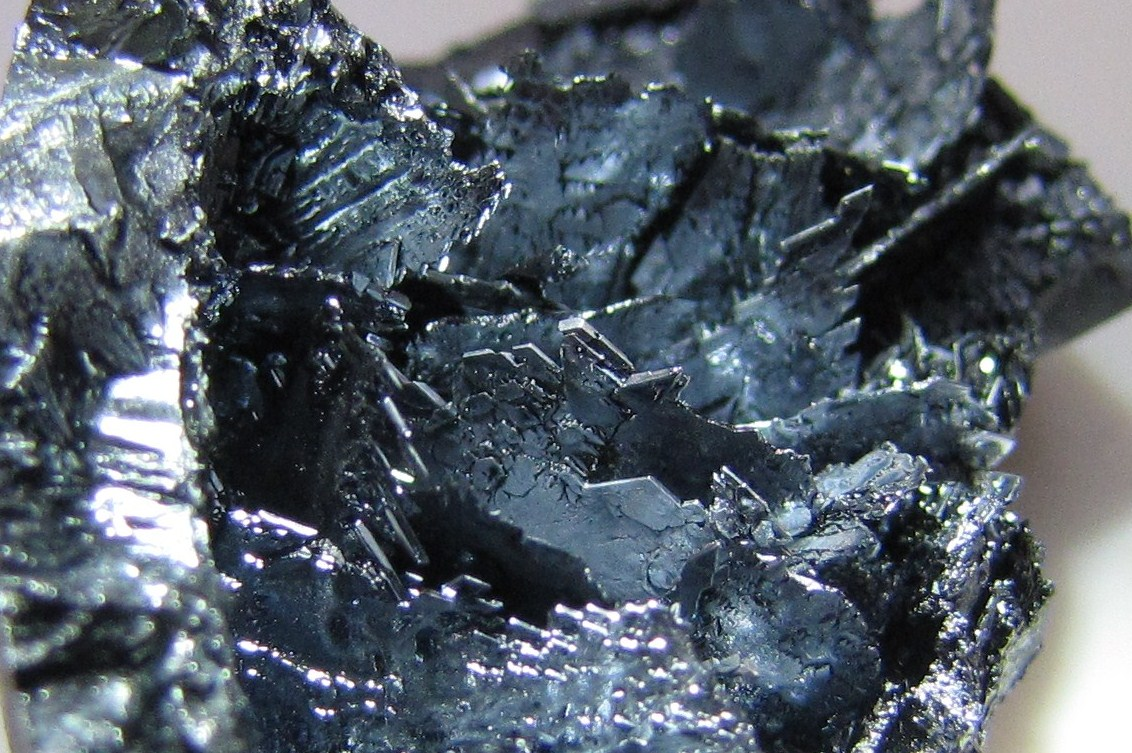
Iodine appears
metallic under white light

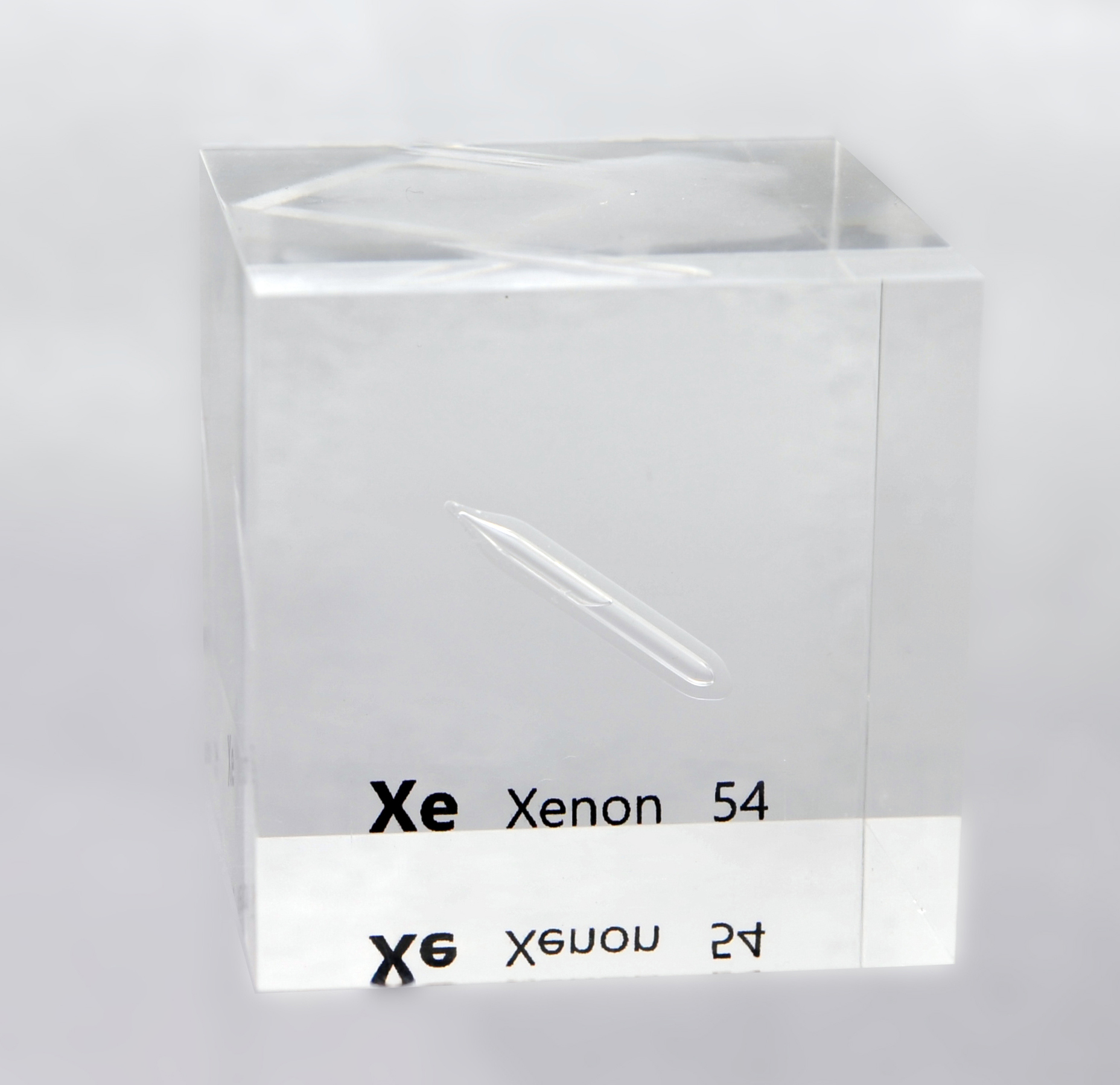
Liquefied xenon remains colorless

Nonmetals vary greatly in appearance, being colorless, colored or shiny. For the colorless nonmetals (hydrogen, nitrogen, oxygen, and the noble gases), no absorption of light happens in the visible part of the spectrum, and all visible light is transmitted. The colored nonmetals (sulfur, fluorine, chlorine, bromine) absorb some colors (wavelengths) and transmit the complementary or opposite colors. For example, chlorine's "familiar yellow-green colour ... is due to a broad region of absorption in the violet and blue regions of the spectrum". (Note: The absorbed light may be converted to heat or re-emitted in all directions so that the emission spectrum is thousands of times weaker than the incident light radiation.) The shininess of boron, graphite (carbon), silicon, black phosphorus, germanium, arsenic, selenium, antimony, tellurium, and iodine (Note: Solid iodine has a silvery metallic appearance under white light at room temperature. At ordinary and higher temperatures it sublimes from the solid phase directly into a violet-colored vapor.) is a result of the electrons reflecting incoming visible light.

About half of nonmetallic elements are gases at or near standard temperature and pressure; most of the rest are solids. Bromine, the only liquid, is usually topped by a layer of its reddish-brown fumes. The gaseous and liquid nonmetals have very low densities, melting and boiling points, and are poor conductors of heat and electricity. The solid nonmetals have low densities and low mechanical strength—being either hard and brittle or soft and crumbly—and show wide variations in their melting, boiling, or sublimation points and thermal and electrical conductivity. (Note: The solid nonmetals have electrical conductivity values ranging from 10^{−18} S•cm^{−1} for sulfur to 3 × 10^{4} in graphite or 3.9 × 10^{4} for arsenic; cf. 0.69 × 10^{4} for manganese to 63 × 10^{4} for silver, both metals. The conductivity of graphite and arsenic (both semimetals) exceed that of manganese.)

This diversity stems from variability in crystallographic structures and bonding arrangements. Covalent nonmetals existing as discrete atoms like xenon, or as small molecules, such as oxygen, sulfur, and bromine, have low melting and boiling points; many are gases at room temperature, as they are held together by weak London dispersion forces acting between their atoms or molecules, although the molecules themselves have strong covalent bonds. In contrast, nonmetals that form extended structures, such as long chains of selenium atoms, sheets of carbon atoms in graphite, or three-dimensional lattices of silicon atoms have higher melting and boiling points, and are all solids. Nonmetals closer to the left or bottom of the periodic table (and so closer to the metals) often have metallic interactions between their molecules, chains, or layers; this occurs in carbon, phosphorus, arsenic, selenium, antimony, tellurium and iodine. These interactions result in relatively good electrical conductivity in the case of carbon, arsenic and antimony; a smaller then expected band gap in phosphorus; smaller than expected distances between adjacent chains in selenium and tellurium; and contribute to weak electrical conductivity in iodine.

Covalently bonded nonmetals often share only the electrons required to achieve a noble gas electron configuration. For example, nitrogen forms diatomic molecules featuring a triple bonds between each atom, both of which thereby attain the configuration of the noble gas neon. In contrast antimony has buckled layers in which each antimony atom is singly bonded with three other nearby atoms.

Good electrical conductivity occurs when there is metallic bonding, however the electrons in some nonmetals are not metallic. Good electrical and thermal conductivity associated with metallic electrons is seen in carbon (as graphite, along its planes), arsenic, and antimony. (Note: Thermal conductivity values for metals range from 6.3 W m^{−1} K^{−1} for neptunium to 429 for silver; cf. antimony 24.3, arsenic 50, and carbon 2000. Electrical conductivity values of metals range from 0.69 S•cm^{−1} × 10^{4} for manganese to 63 × 10^{4} for silver; cf. carbon 3 × 10^{4}, arsenic 3.9 × 10^{4} and antimony 2.3 × 10^{4}.) Good thermal conductivity occurs in boron, silicon, phosphorus, and germanium; such conductivity is transmitted though vibrations of the crystalline lattices (phonons) of these elements. Moderate electrical conductivity is observed in the semiconductors boron, silicon, phosphorus, germanium, selenium, tellurium, and iodine.

Many of the nonmetallic elements are hard and brittle, where dislocations cannot readily move so they tend to undergo brittle fracture rather than deforming. Some do deform such as white phosphorus (soft as wax, pliable and can be cut with a knife at room temperature), plastic sulfur, and selenium which can be drawn into wires from its molten state. Graphite is a standard solid lubricant where dislocations move very easily in the basal planes.

=== Chemical ===
Nonmetals can be characterised in terms of their reactivity, quantitative properties such as electronegativity, and the nature of their compounds.

==== Reactivity ====
They range in reactivity from inert or barely reactive, through relatively unreactive and moderately reactive, to highly reactive. Examples include helium (inert); xenon (barely reactive); molecular nitrogen and graphite (relatively unreactive); sulfur and black phosphorus (moderately reactive); and fluorine (highly reactive).

In chemical reactions they tend to gain or share enough electrons to attain a noble-gas-like valence-shell electron configuration. This behavior is related to the relative stability of the filled valence shells in the noble gases. It is empirically represented by the duet and octet rules of thumb (noting several exceptions) and treated more fully by valence bond theory.

The noble gases are a special case in relation to this electron-counting pattern, since their valence shells are already filled and their atoms are correspondingly resistant to chemical reaction. This stability is not, however, absolute: the heavier noble gases, especially xenon, form a relatively small number of compounds, mostly with fluorine or oxygen, in which electron density is drawn away from the noble-gas atom and it is formally oxidised.

The behavior of nonmetals stems from variations in how strongly atoms attract and retain electrons. Across a period of the periodic table, the nuclear charge increases as more protons are added to the nucleus. However, because the number of inner electron shells remains constant, the effective nuclear charge experienced by the outermost electrons also increases, pulling them closer to the nucleus. This leads to a corresponding reduction in atomic radius, and a greater tendency of these elements to gain electrons during chemical reactions, in some cases forming negatively charged ions. Nonmetals, which nearly all occupy the right-hand side of the periodic table, exemplify this behavior.

==== Quantitative properties ====
Nonmetals have moderate to very high electronegativity values, and typically exhibit higher ionization energies, electron affinities, and standard electrode potentials than metals. The higher these values are (including electronegativity) the more nonmetallic the element tends to be. For example, the chemically very active nonmetals fluorine, chlorine, bromine, and iodine have an average electronegativity of 3.19—a figure (Note: Electronegativity values of fluorine to iodine are: 3.98 + 3.16 + 2.96 + 2.66 = 12.76/4 = 3.19.) higher than that of any metallic element. Nitrogen and the noble gases are notable exceptions to the general trend in electron affinity.

==== Compounds ====
With metals, nonmetals form compounds with bonding ranging from predominantly ionic to substantially covalent. In some cases they also form alloys, as in carbon steels. Under ordinary conditions, simple compounds between noble gases and metals are not known. With nonmetals, nonmetals generally form covalent compounds. In aqueous solution, compounds of nonmetals commonly give rise to oxyanions or anions. Their oxides are usually acidic. Exceptions may occur if a nonmetal is not very electronegative, or if its oxidation state is low, or both. These non-acidic oxides of nonmetals may be amphoteric (like water, H_{2}O) or neutral (like nitrous oxide, N_{2}O (Note: While CO and NO are commonly referred to as being neutral, CO is a slightly acidic oxide, reacting with bases to produce formates (CO + OH^{−} → HCOO^{−}); and in water, NO reacts with oxygen to form nitrous acid HNO_{2} (4NO + O_{2} + 2H_{2}O → 4HNO_{2}).)), but never basic.

The number of compounds formed by nonmetals is vast. The first 10 places in a "top 20" table of elements most frequently encountered in 895,501,834 compounds, as listed in the Chemical Abstracts Service register for November 2, 2021, were occupied by nonmetals. Hydrogen, carbon, oxygen, and nitrogen collectively appeared in most (80%) of compounds. Silicon, a metalloid, ranked 11th. The highest-rated metal, with an occurrence frequency of 0.14%, was iron, in 12th place.

=== Complications ===
Adding complexity to the chemistry of the nonmetals are less stable allotropic variations of some of the nonmetals; anomalies occurring in the first row of each periodic table block; non-uniform periodic trends; higher oxidation states; multiple bond formation; and property overlaps with metals.

==== Allotropes ====
Three allotropes of carbon

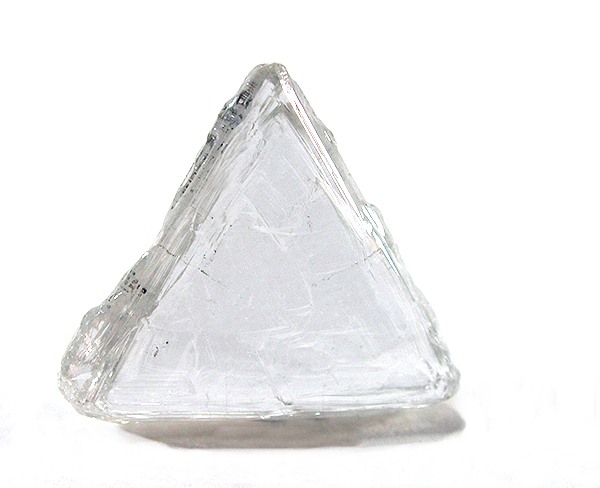
A transparent electrical insulator

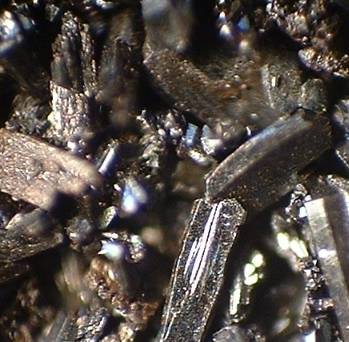
A brownish semiconductor

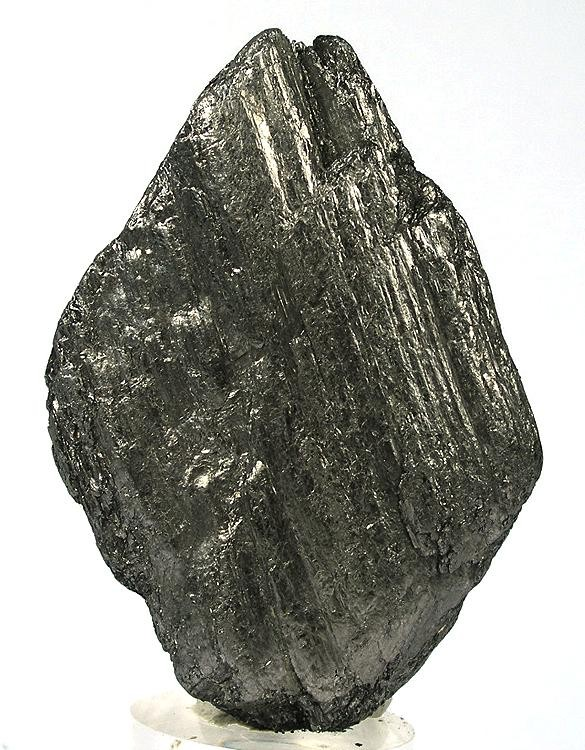
A blackish semimetal

From left to right, diamond, buckminsterfullerene, and graphite

Over half of the nonmetallic elements exhibit a range of less stable allotropic forms, each with distinct physical properties. For example, carbon, the most stable form of which is graphite, can manifest as diamond, buckminsterfullerene, amorphous and paracrystalline variations. Allotropes also occur for nitrogen, oxygen, phosphorus, sulfur, selenium and iodine.

==== First-row anomaly ====
Condensed periodic table highlighting the first row of each block: s p d and f
Period	s-block
1	H 1	He; 2			p-block
2	Li; 3	Be; 4			B 5	C 6	N 7	O 8	F 9	Ne; 10
3	Na; 11	Mg; 12		d-block	Al; 13	Si; 14	P 15	S 16	Cl; 17	Ar; 18
4	K 19	Ca; 20		Sc-Zn; 21-30	Ga; 31	Ge; 32	As; 33	Se; 34	Br; 35	Kr; 36
5	Rb; 37	Sr; 38	f-block	Y-Cd; 39-48	In; 49	Sn; 50	Sb; 51	Te; 52	I 53	Xe; 54
6	Cs; 55	Ba; 56	La-Yb; 57-70	Lu-Hg; 71-80	Tl; 81	Pb; 82	Bi; 83	Po; 84	At; 85	Rn; 86
7	Fr; 87	Ra; 88	Ac-No; 89-102	Lr-Cn; 103-112	Nh; 113	Fl; 114	Mc; 115	Lv; 116	Ts; 117	Og; 118
Group	(1)	(2)		(3-12)	(13)	(14)	(15)	(16)	(17)	(18)
The first-row anomaly strength by block is s >> p > d > f. (Note: Helium is shown above beryllium for electron configuration consistency purposes; as a noble gas it is usually placed above neon, in group 18.)

Starting with hydrogen, the first-row anomaly primarily arises from the electron configurations of the elements concerned. Hydrogen is notable for its diverse bonding behaviors. It most commonly forms covalent bonds, but it can also lose its single electron in an aqueous solution, leaving behind a bare proton with high polarizing power. Consequently, this proton can attach itself to the lone electron pair of an oxygen atom in a water molecule, laying the foundation for acid–base chemistry. Moreover, a hydrogen atom in a molecule can form a second, albeit weaker, bond with an atom or group of atoms in another molecule. Such bonding, "helps give snowflakes their hexagonal symmetry, binds DNA into a double helix; shapes the three-dimensional forms of proteins; and even raises water's boiling point high enough to make a decent cup of tea."

Hydrogen and helium, as well as boron through neon, have small atomic radii. The ionization energies and electronegativities among these elements are higher than the periodic trends would otherwise suggest.

While it would normally be expected, on electron configuration consistency grounds, that hydrogen and helium would be placed atop the s-block elements, the significant first-row anomaly shown by these two elements justifies alternative placements. Hydrogen is occasionally positioned above fluorine, in group 17, rather than above lithium in group 1. Helium is almost always placed above neon, in group 18, rather than above beryllium in group 2.

==== Secondary periodicity ====
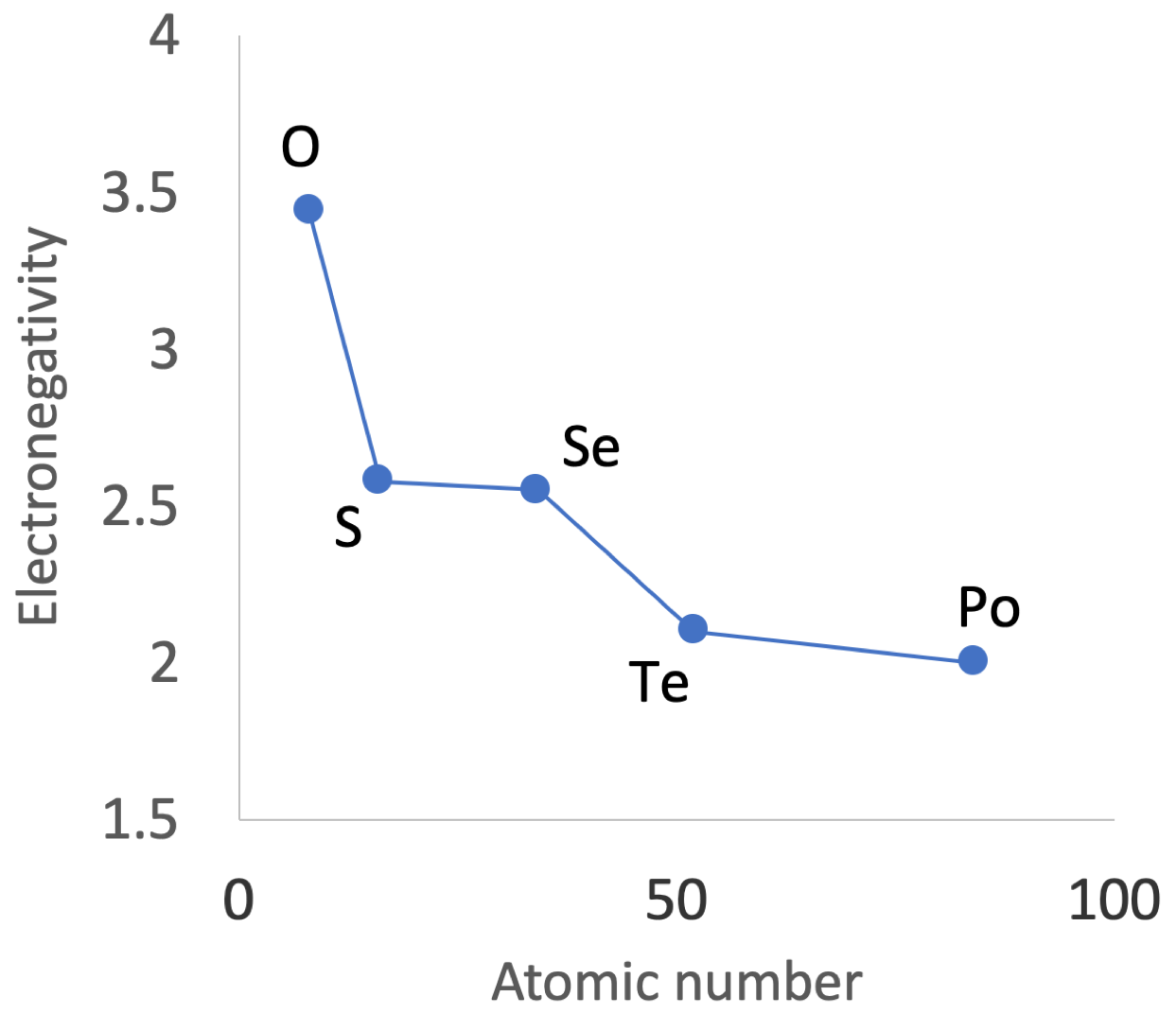
Electronegativity values of the group 16 chalcogen elements showing a W-shaped alternation or secondary periodicity going down the group

An alternation in certain periodic trends, sometimes referred to as secondary periodicity, becomes evident when descending groups 13 to 15, and to a lesser extent, groups 16 and 17. (Note: The net result is an even-odd difference between periods (except in the s-block): elements in even periods have smaller atomic radii and prefer to lose fewer electrons, while elements in odd periods (except the first) differ in the opposite direction. Many properties in the p-block then show a zigzag rather than a smooth trend along the group. For example, phosphorus and antimony in odd periods of group 15 readily reach the +5 oxidation state, whereas nitrogen, arsenic, and bismuth in even periods prefer to stay at +3.) Immediately after the first row of d-block metals, from scandium to zinc, the 3d electrons in the p-block elements—specifically, gallium (a metal), germanium, arsenic, selenium, and bromine—prove less effective at shielding the increasing positive nuclear charge.

The Soviet chemist Shchukarev gives two more tangible examples:

"The toxicity of some arsenic compounds, and the absence of this property in analogous compounds of phosphorus [P] and antimony [Sb]; and the ability of selenic acid [H_{2}SeO_{4}] to bring metallic gold [Au] into solution, and the absence of this property in sulfuric [H_{2}SO_{4}] and [H_{2}TeO_{4}] acids."

==== Higher oxidation states ====
Roman numerals such as III, V and VIII denote oxidation states

Some nonmetallic elements exhibit oxidation states that deviate from those predicted by the octet rule, which typically results in an oxidation state of –3 in group 15, –2 in group 16, –1 in group 17, and 0 in group 18. Examples include ammonia NH_{3}, hydrogen sulfide H_{2}S, hydrogen fluoride HF, and elemental xenon Xe. Meanwhile, the maximum possible oxidation state increases from +5 in group 15, to +8 in group 18. The +5 oxidation state is observable from period 2 onward, in compounds such as nitric acid HN(V)O_{3} and phosphorus pentafluoride PCl_{5}. (Note: Oxidation states do not reflect the actual net charge of atoms in molecules or ions, they represents the valence which refers more to how many bonds there are. For instance carbon typically has a valence of +4, but that only means that it forms three bonds. Electronegative elements such as fluorine are conventionally associated with negative valence, while electropositive ones have positive valence.) Higher oxidation states in later groups emerge from period 3 onwards, as seen in sulfur hexafluoride SF_{6}, iodine heptafluoride IF_{7}, and xenon(VIII) tetroxide XeO_{4}. For heavier nonmetals, their larger atomic radii and lower electronegativity values enable the formation of compounds with higher oxidation numbers, supporting higher bulk coordination numbers.

==== Multiple bond formation ====
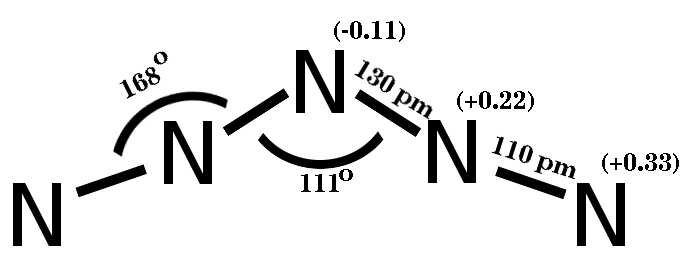
Molecular structure of pentazenium, a homopolyatomic cation of nitrogen with the formula N_{5}^{+} and structure N−N−N−N−N.

Period 2 nonmetals, particularly carbon, nitrogen, and oxygen, show a propensity to form multiple bonds. The compounds formed by these elements often exhibit unique stoichiometries and structures, as seen in the various nitrogen oxides, which are not commonly found in elements from later periods.

==== Property overlaps ====
While certain elements have traditionally been classified as nonmetals and others as metals, some overlapping of properties occurs. Writing early in the twentieth century, by which time the era of modern chemistry had been well-established (although not as yet more precise quantum chemistry) Humphrey observed that:

... these two groups, however, are not marked off perfectly sharply from each other; some nonmetals resemble metals in certain of their properties, and some metals approximate in some ways to the non-metals.

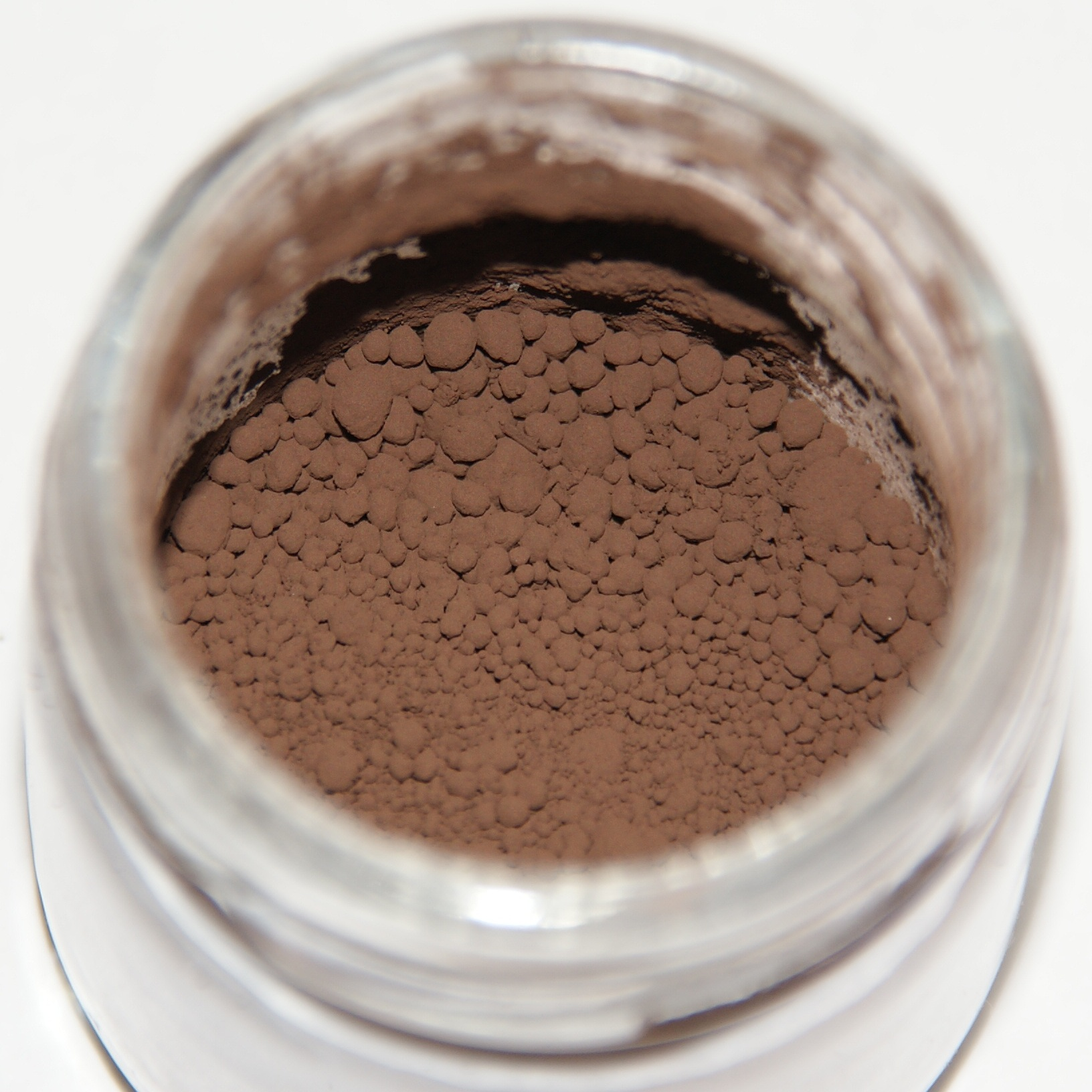
Boron (here in its less stable amorphous form) shares some similarities with metals (Note: Greenwood commented that: "The extent to which metallic elements mimic boron (in having fewer electrons than orbitals available for bonding) has been a fruitful cohering concept in the development of metalloborane chemistry ... Indeed, metals have been referred to as "honorary boron atoms" or even as "flexiboron atoms". The converse of this relationship is clearly also valid.")

Examples of metal-like properties occurring in nonmetallic elements include:

- Silicon has an electronegativity (1.9) comparable with metals such as cobalt (1.88), copper (1.9), nickel (1.91) and silver (1.93);
- The electrical conductivity of graphite exceeds that of some metals; (Note: For example, the conductivity of graphite is 3 × 10^{4} S•cm^{−1.} whereas that of manganese is 6.9 × 10^{3} S•cm^{−1}.)
- Selenium can be drawn into a wire;
- Radon is the most metallic of the noble gases and begins to show some cationic behavior, which is unusual for a nonmetal; and
- In extreme conditions, just over half of nonmetallic elements can form homopolyatomic cations. (Note: A homopolyatomic cation consists of two or more atoms of the same element bonded together and carrying a positive charge, for example, N_{5}^{+}, O_{2}^{+} and Cl_{4}^{+}. This is unusual behavior for nonmetals since cation formation is normally associated with metals, and nonmetals are normally associated with anion formation. Homopolyatomic cations are further known for carbon, phosphorus, antimony, sulfur, selenium, tellurium, bromine, iodine and xenon.)

Examples of nonmetal-like properties occurring in metals are:

- Tungsten displays some nonmetallic properties, sometimes being brittle, having a high electronegativity, and forming only anions in aqueous solution, and predominately acidic oxides.
- Gold, the "king of metals" has the highest electrode potential among metals, suggesting a preference for gaining rather than losing electrons. Gold's ionization energy is one of the highest among metals, and its electron affinity and electronegativity are high, with the latter exceeding that of some nonmetals. It forms the Au^{–} auride anion and exhibits a tendency to bond to itself, behaviors which are unexpected for metals. In aurides (MAu, where M = Li–Cs), gold's behavior is similar to that of a halogen. The reason for this is that gold has a large enough nuclear potential that the electrons have to be considered with relativistic effects included, which changes some of the properties.

A relatively recent development involves certain compounds of heavier p-block elements, such as silicon, phosphorus, germanium, arsenic and antimony, exhibiting behaviors typically associated with transition metal complexes. This is linked to a small energy gap between their filled and empty molecular orbitals, which are the regions in a molecule where electrons reside and where they can be available for chemical reactions. In such compounds, this allows for unusual reactivity with small molecules like hydrogen (H_{2}), ammonia (NH_{3}), and ethylene (C_{2}H_{4}), a characteristic previously observed primarily in transition metal compounds. These reactions may open new avenues in catalytic applications.

== Types ==
Nonmetal classification schemes vary widely, with some accommodating as few as two subtypes and others up to seven. For example, the periodic table in the Encyclopaedia Britannica recognizes noble gases, halogens, and other nonmetals, and splits the elements commonly recognized as metalloids between "other metals" and "other nonmetals". On the other hand, seven of twelve color categories on the Royal Society of Chemistry periodic table include nonmetals. (Note: Of the twelve categories in the Royal Society periodic table, five only show up with the metal filter, three only with the nonmetal filter, and four with both filters. Interestingly, the six elements marked as metalloids (boron, silicon, germanium, arsenic, antimony, and tellurium) show under both filters. Six other elements (113–118: nihonium, flerovium, moscovium, livermorium, tennessine, and oganesson), whose status is unknown, also show up under both filters but are not included in any of the twelve color categories.)

	Group (1, 13−18)				Period	
13	14	15	16	1/17	18	(1−6)
				H	He	1
B	C	N	O	F	Ne	2
	Si	P	S	Cl	Ar	3
	Ge	As	Se	Br	Kr	4
		Sb	Te	I	Xe	5
					Rn	6

Starting on the right side of the periodic table, three types of nonmetals can be recognized:

the relatively unreactive noble gases—helium, neon, argon, krypton, xenon, radon;
the reactive halogen nonmetals—fluorine, chlorine, bromine, iodine; and
the mixed reactivity "unclassified nonmetals", a set with no widely used collective name—hydrogen, carbon, nitrogen, oxygen, phosphorus, sulfur, selenium. (Note: Varying configurations of these nonmetals have been referred to as, for example, basic nonmetals, bioelements, central nonmetals, CHNOPS, essential elements, "non-metals", (Note: The quote marks are not found in the source; they are used here to make it clear that the source employs the word non-metals as a formal term for the subset of chemical elements in question, rather than applying to nonmetals generally.) orphan nonmetals, or redox nonmetals.) The descriptive phrase unclassified nonmetals is used here for convenience.

The elements in a fourth set are sometimes recognized as nonmetals:

the generally unreactive (Note: "Crystalline boron is relatively inert." Silicon "is generally highly unreactive". "Germanium is a relatively inert semimetal." "Pure arsenic is also relatively inert." (Note: Arsenic is stable in dry air. Extended exposure in moist air results in the formation of a black surface coating. "Arsenic is not readily attacked by water, alkaline solutions or non-oxidizing acids". It can occasionally be found in nature in an uncombined form. It has a positive standard reduction potential (As → As^{3+} + 3e = +0.30 V), corresponding to a classification of semi-noble metal.) "Metallic antimony is ... inert at room temperature." "Compared to S and Se, Te has relatively low chemical reactivity.") metalloids, sometimes considered a third category distinct from metals and nonmetals—boron, silicon, germanium, arsenic, antimony, tellurium.

While many of the early workers attempted to classify elements none of their classifications were satisfactory. They were divided into metals and nonmetals, but some were soon found to have properties of both. These were called metalloids. This only added to the confusion by making two indistinct divisions where one existed before.

— Whiteford & Coffin 1939, Essentials of College Chemistry

The boundaries between these types are not sharp. (Note: Boundary fuzziness and overlaps often occur in classification schemes.) Carbon, phosphorus, selenium, and iodine border the metalloids and show some metallic character, as does hydrogen.

The greatest discrepancy between authors occurs in metalloid "frontier territory". Some consider metalloids distinct from both metals and nonmetals, while others classify them as nonmetals. Some categorize certain metalloids as metals (e.g., arsenic and antimony due to their similarities to heavy metals). (Note: Jones takes a philosophical or pragmatic view to these questions. He writes: "Though classification is an essential feature of all branches of science, there are always hard cases at the boundaries. The boundary of a class is rarely sharp ... Scientists should not lose sleep over the hard cases. As long as a classification system is beneficial to economy of description, to structuring knowledge and to our understanding, and hard cases constitute a small minority, then keep it. If the system becomes less than useful, then scrap it and replace it with a system based on different shared characteristics.") Metalloids resemble the elements universally considered "nonmetals" in having relatively low densities, high electronegativity, and similar chemical behavior. (Note: For a related comparison of the properties of metals, metalloids, and nonmetals, see Rudakiya & Patel (2021), p. 36.)

=== Noble gases ===
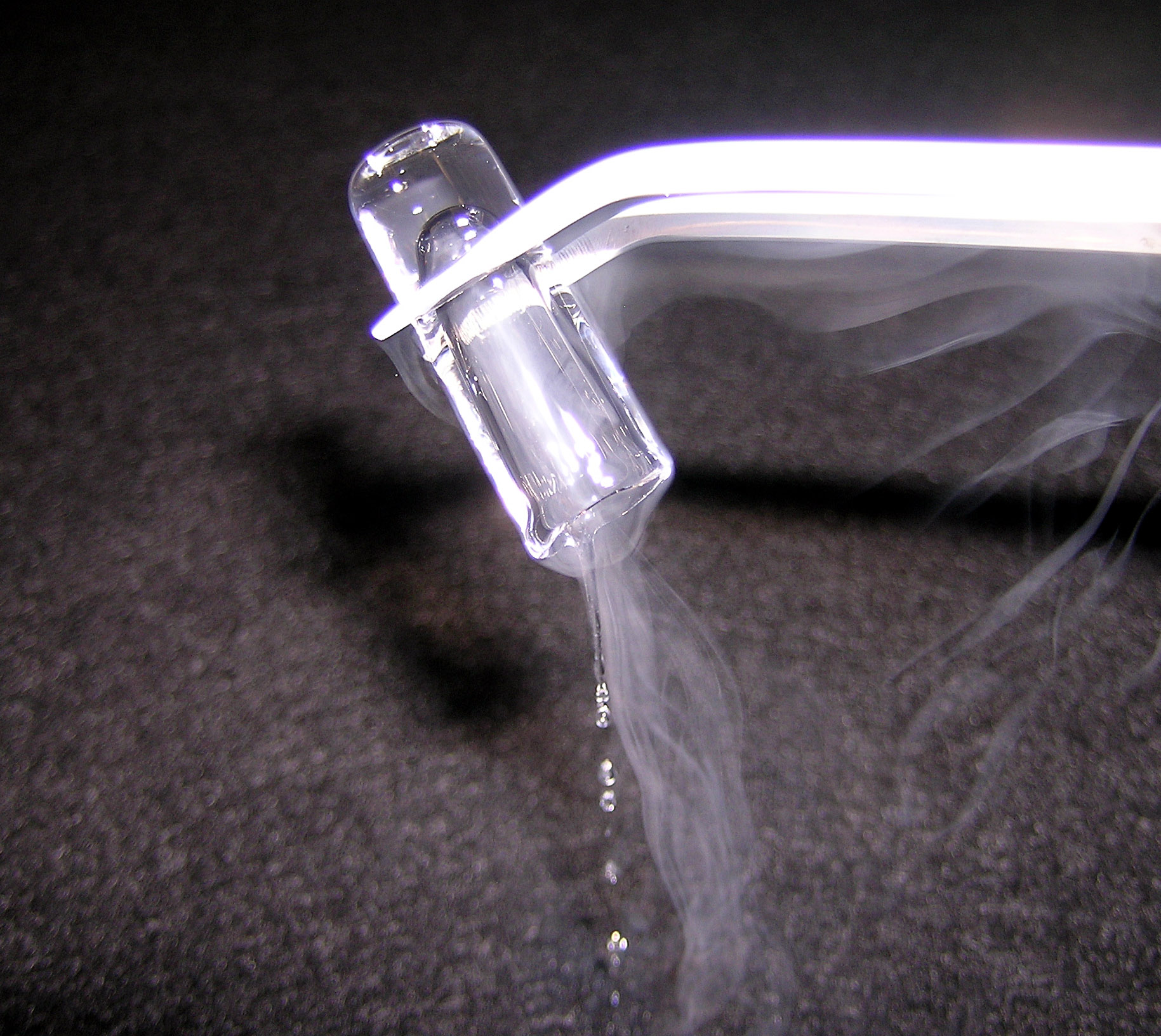
A small (about 2 cm long) piece of rapidly melting argon ice

Six nonmetals are classified as noble gases: helium, neon, argon, krypton, xenon, and the radioactive radon. In conventional periodic tables they occupy the rightmost column. They are called noble gases due to their exceptionally low chemical reactivity.

These elements exhibit similar properties, being colorlessness, odorless, and nonflammable. Due to their closed outer electron shells, noble gases possess weak interatomic forces of attraction, leading to exceptionally low melting and boiling points.

Chemically, the noble gases exhibit relatively high ionization energies, negligible or negative electron affinities, and high to very high electronegativities. The number of compounds formed by noble gases is in the hundreds and continues to expand, with most of these compounds involving the combination of oxygen or fluorine with either krypton, xenon, or radon.

=== Halogen nonmetals ===
Chemically, the halogen nonmetals have high ionization energies, electron affinities, and electronegativity values, and are relatively strong oxidizing agents. All four elements tend to form primarily ionic compounds with metals, in contrast to the remaining nonmetals (except for oxygen) which tend to form primarily covalent compounds with metals. (Note: Metal oxides are usually somewhat ionic, depending upon the metal element electropositivity. On the other hand, oxides of metals with high oxidation states are often either polymeric or covalent. A polymeric oxide has a linked structure composed of multiple repeating units.)

=== Unclassified nonmetals ===
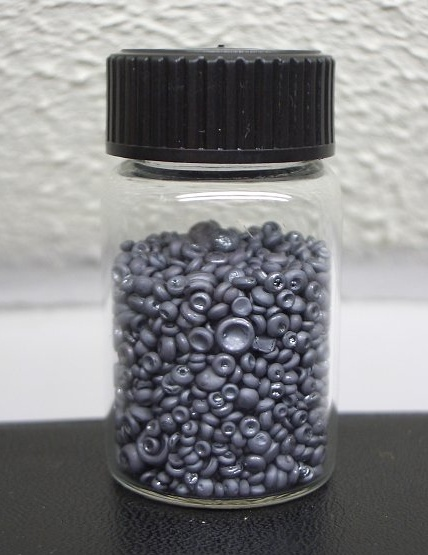
Selenium conducts electricity around 1,000 times better when light falls on it, a property used in light-sensing applications.

Hydrogen behaves in some respects like a metallic element and in others like a nonmetal. Like a metallic element it can, for example, form a solvated cation in aqueous solution; it can substitute for alkali metals in compounds such as the chlorides (NaCl cf. HCl) and nitrates (KNO_{3} cf. HNO_{3}), and in certain alkali metal complexes as a nonmetal. It attains this configuration by forming a covalent or ionic bond or by bonding as an ion to a lone pair of electrons.

Some or all of these nonmetals share several properties. Being generally less reactive than the halogens, most of them can occur naturally in the environment. Collectively, their physical and chemical characteristics can be described as "moderately non-metallic". When combined with metals, the unclassified nonmetals can form interstitial or refractory compounds. They also exhibit a tendency to bond to themselves, particularly in solid compounds. Additionally, diagonal periodic table relationships among these nonmetals mirror similar relationships among the metalloids.

== Abundance, extraction, and uses ==
=== Abundance ===
Approximate composition (top three components by weight; elements marked *nonmetal metal )
Universe	75% *hydrogen	23% *helium	1% *oxygen
Atmosphere	78% *nitrogen	21% *oxygen	0.5% *argon
Hydrosphere	86% *oxygen	11% *hydrogen	2% *chlorine
Biomass	63% *oxygen	20% *carbon	10% *hydrogen
Crust	46% *oxygen	27% *silicon	8% aluminium
Earth	32% iron	30% *oxygen	14% magnesium

The abundance of elements in the universe results from nuclear physics processes like nucleosynthesis and radioactive decay.

The volatile noble gas nonmetal elements are less abundant in the atmosphere than expected based upon their overall abundance due to cosmic nucleosynthesis. Mechanisms to explain this difference is an important aspect of planetary science. The element Xe is unexpectedly depleted, and a possible explanation comes from theoretical models of the high pressures in the Earth's core suggesting that there may be around 10^{13} tons of xenon in the form of stable XeFe_{3} and XeNi_{3} intermetallic compounds.

Five nonmetals—hydrogen, carbon, nitrogen, oxygen, and silicon—form the bulk of the directly observable structure of the Earth: about 73% of the crust, 93% of the biomass, 96% of the hydrosphere, and over 99% of the atmosphere, as shown in the accompanying table. Silicon and oxygen form stable tetrahedral structures, known as silicates. Here, "the powerful bond that unites the oxygen and silicon ions is the cement that holds the Earth's crust together." However, they make up less than 50% of the total weight of the earth.

In the biomass, the relative abundance of the first four nonmetals (and phosphorus, sulfur, and selenium marginally) is attributed to a combination of relatively small atomic size, and sufficient spare electrons. These two properties enable them to bind to one another and "some other elements, to produce a molecular soup sufficient to build a self-replicating system".

=== Extraction ===
Nine of the 23 nonmetallic elements are gases, or form compounds that are gases, and are extracted from natural gas or liquid air, including hydrogen, nitrogen, oxygen, sulfur, and most of the noble gases. For example, nitrogen and oxygen are extracted from liquid air through fractional distillation and sulfur from the hydrogen sulfide in natural gas by reacting it with oxygen to yield water and sulfur. Three nonmetals are extracted from seawater; the rest of the nonmetals – and almost all metals – from mining solid ores.

	Group (1, 13−18)				Period	
13	14	15	16	1/17	18	(1−6)
				H	He	1
B	C	N	O	F	Ne	2
	Si	P	S	Cl	Ar	3
	Ge	As	Se	Br	Kr	4
		Sb	Te	I	Xe	5
					Rn	6

Nonmetallic elements are extracted from these sources:

3 from natural gas components
hydrogen (methane), helium, and sulfur (hydrogen sulfide)

6 from liquefied air
nitrogen, oxygen, neon, argon, krypton, and xenon

3 from seawater brine
chlorine, bromine, and iodine

12 from solid ores
boron (borates), carbon (natural graphite), silicon (silica), phosphorus (phosphates), iodine (sodium iodate), radon (uranium ore decay product), fluorine (fluorite); and germanium, arsenic, selenium, antimony, and tellurium (from their sulfides).

=== Uses ===
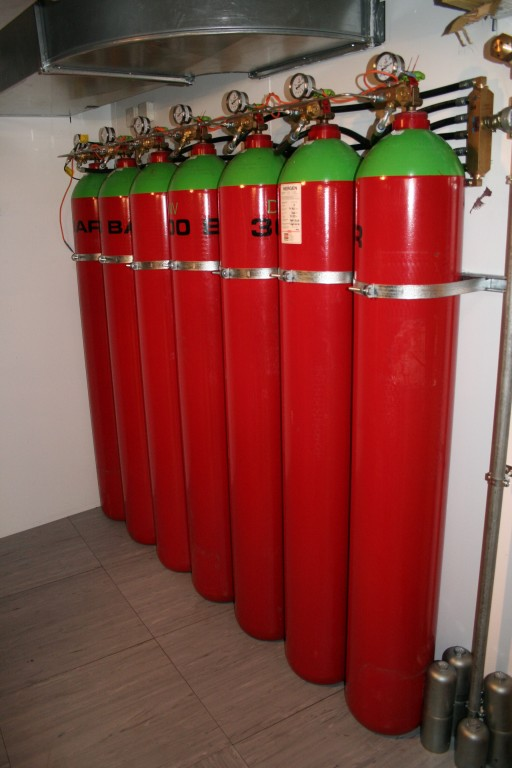
Cylinders containing argon gas for use in extinguishing fire without damaging computer server equipment

Nonmetallic elements are present in combination with other elements in almost everything around us, from water to plastics and within metallic alloys. There are some specific uses of the elements themselves, although these are less common; extensive details can be found in the specific pages of the relevant elements. A few examples are:

1. Hydrogen can be used in fuel cells, and is being explored for a possible future low-carbon hydrogen economy.
2. Carbon has many uses, ranging from decorative applications of diamond jewelry to diamond in cutting blades and graphite as a solid lubricant.
3. Liquid nitrogen is extensively used as a coolant.
4. Oxygen is a critical component of the air we breath. (While nitrogen is also present, it is less used from the air, mainly by certain bacteria.) Oxygen gas and liquid is also heavily used for combustion in welding and cutting torches and as a component of rocket fuels.
5. Silicon is the most widely used semiconductor. While ultra-pure silicon is an insulator, by selectively adding electronic dopants it can be used as a semiconductor where the chemical potential of the electrons can be manipulated, this being exploited in a wide range of electronic devices.
6. The noble gases have a range of applications, including liquid helium for cryogenic cooling, and argon in gaseous fire suppression to damp fires around sensitive electrical equipment where water cannot be used.
7. Radon is a potentially hazardous indoor pollutant.

== Taxonomical history ==
=== Background ===
Medieval chemical philosophers focused on metals, rarely investigating nonmetallic minerals.

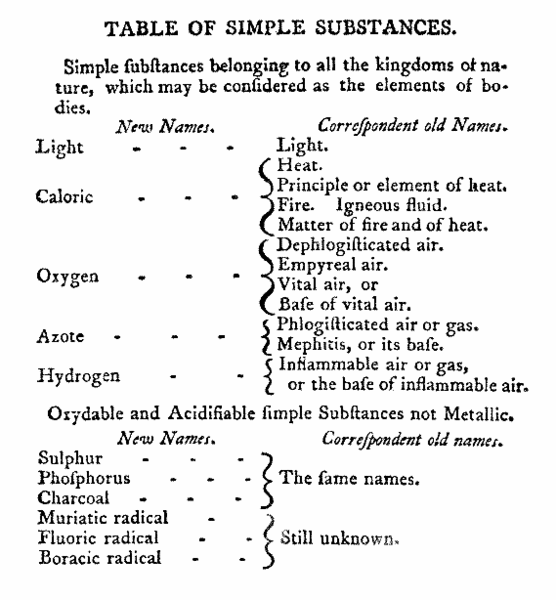
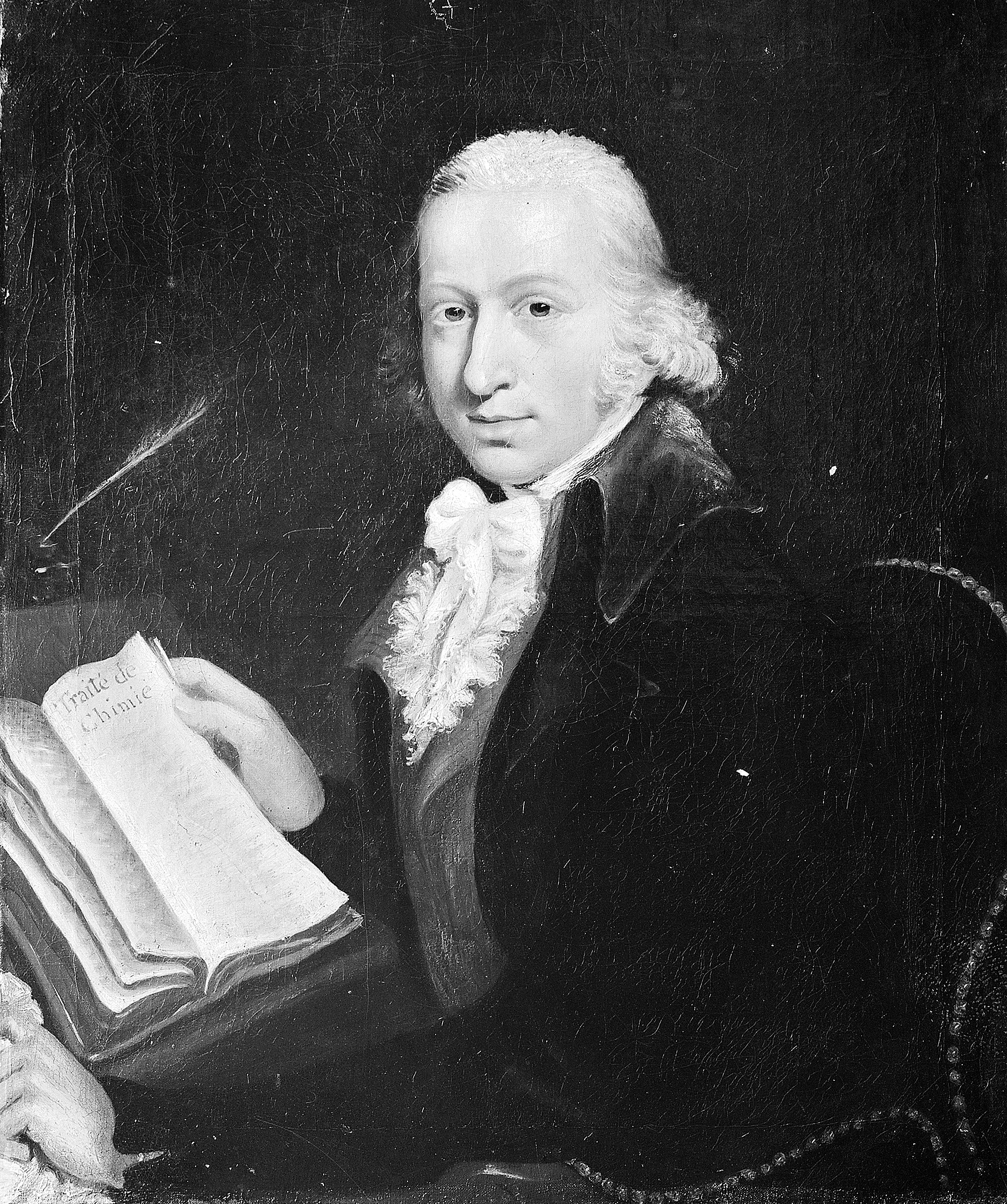
French nobleman and chemist Antoine Lavoisier (1743–1794), with a page of the English translation of his 1789 Traité élémentaire de chimie, listing the elemental gases oxygen, hydrogen and nitrogen (and erroneously including light and caloric); the nonmetallic substances sulfur, phosphorus, and carbon; and the chloride, fluoride and borate ions

=== Organization of elements by types ===
In the late 1700s, French chemist Antoine Lavoisier published the first modern list of chemical elements in his revolutionary 1789 Traité élémentaire de chimie. The 33 elements known to Lavoisier were categorized into four distinct groups, including gases, metallic substances, nonmetallic substances that form acids when oxidized, and earths (heat-resistant oxides). Lavoisier's work gained widespread recognition and was republished in twenty-three editions across six languages within its first seventeen years, significantly advancing the understanding of chemistry in Europe and America. Lavoisier's chemistry was "dualistic": "salts" were combinations of "acid" and "base"; acids were combinations of oxygen and metals while bases were combinations of oxygen and nonmetals. This view prevailed despite increasing evidence that chemicals like chlorine and ammonia contained no oxygen, in large part due the vigious if sometimes misguided defense by the Swedish chemist Berzelius.

In 1802 the term "metalloids" was introduced for elements with the physical properties of metals but the chemical properties of non-metals. In 1811 Berzelius used the term "metalloids" to describe all nonmetallic elements, noting their ability to form negatively charged ions with oxygen in aqueous solutions. Drawing on this, in 1864 the "Manual of Metalloids" divided all elements into either metals or metalloids, with the latter group including elements now called nonmetals. Reviews of the book indicated that the term "metalloids" was still endorsed by leading authorities, but there were reservations about its appropriateness. While Berzelius' terminology gained significant acceptance, it later faced criticism from some who found it counterintuitive, misapplied, or even invalid. The idea of designating elements like arsenic as metalloids had been considered. The use of the term "metalloids" persisted in France as textbooks of chemistry appeared in the 1800s. During this period, "metals" as a chemical category were characterized by a single property, their affinity for oxygen, while "metalloids" were organized by comparison of many characteristic analogous to the approach of naturalists.

=== Development of types ===
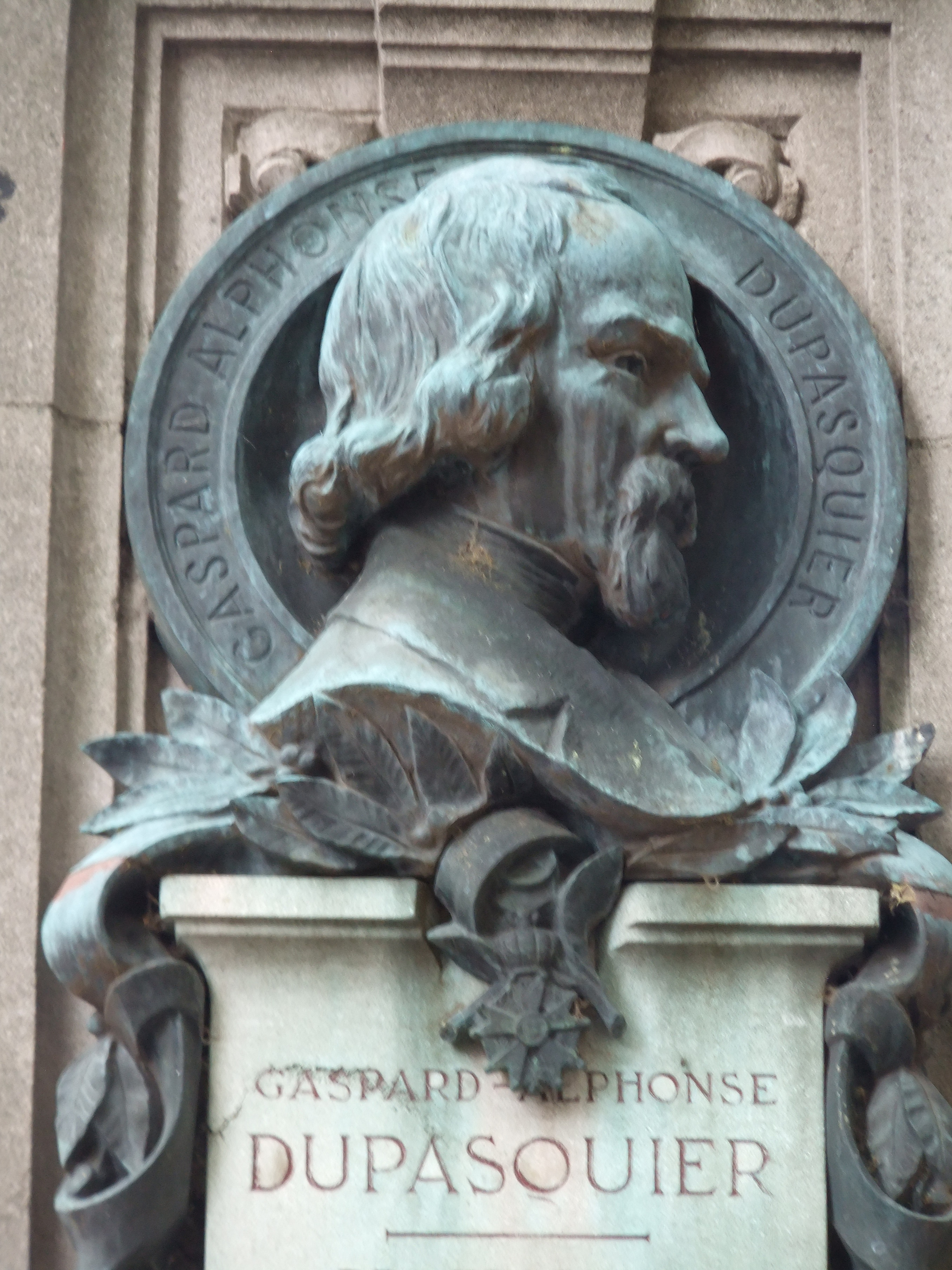
Bust of Dupasquier (1793–1848) in the Monument aux Grands Hommes de la Martinière in Lyon, France.

In 1844, Alphonse Dupasquier, a French doctor, pharmacist, and chemist, established a basic taxonomy of nonmetals to aid in their study. He wrote:

They will be divided into four groups or sections, as in the following:

Organogens—oxygen, nitrogen, hydrogen, carbon
Sulphuroids—sulfur, selenium, phosphorus
Chloroides—fluorine, chlorine, bromine, iodine
Boroids—boron, silicon.

Dupasquier's quartet parallels the modern nonmetal types. The organogens and sulphuroids are akin to the unclassified nonmetals. The chloroides were later called halogens. The boroids eventually evolved into the metalloids, with this classification beginning from as early as 1864. The then unknown noble gases were recognized as a distinct nonmetal group after being discovered in the late 1800s. This taxonomy was noted as a "natural classification" of the substance considering all aspects rather than a single characteristic like oxygen affinity. It was a significant departure from other contemporary classifications, since it grouped together oxygen, nitrogen, hydrogen, and carbon.

In 1828 and 1859, the French chemist Dumas classified nonmetals as (1) hydrogen; (2) fluorine to iodine; (3) oxygen to sulfur; (4) nitrogen to arsenic; and (5) carbon, boron and silicon, thereby anticipating the vertical groupings of Mendeleev's 1871 periodic table. Dumas' five classes fall into modern groups 1, 17, 16, 15, and 14 to 13 respectively.

=== Nonmetals as terminology ===
By as early as 1866, some authors began preferring the term "nonmetal" over "metalloid" to describe nonmetallic elements. In 1875, Kemshead observed that elements were categorized into two groups: non-metals (or metalloids) and metals. He noted that the term "non-metal", despite its compound nature, was more precise and had become universally accepted as the nomenclature of choice.

=== Density and electronegativity ===
Several authors have noted that nonmetals generally have low densities and high electronegativity. Setting aside the six elements most commonly recognised as metalloids, the densest nonmetal is iodine at 4.944 g/cm³ and the nonmetal with the lowest electronegativity (revised Pauling) is phosphorus at 2.19. Nonmetals thus have densities < 5 g/cm³ and electronegativity values ≥ 2.1. If the six elements most commonly recognised as metalloids are included as nonmetals, the densest nonmetal is then antimony at 6.694 g/cm³ and the nonmetal with the lowest electronegativity is silicon at 1.9. The augmented set of nonmetals thus have densities < 7 g/cm³ and electronegativity values ≥ 1.9.

=== Structure, quantum mechanics and band structure ===
The early terminologies were empirical categorizations based upon observables. As the 20th century started there were significant changes in understanding. The first was due to methods, mainly x-ray crystallography, for determining how atoms are arranged in the various materials. As early as 1784 René Just Haüy discovered that every face of a crystal could be described by simple stacking patterns of blocks of the same shape and size (law of decrements). Haüy's study led to the idea that crystals are a regular three-dimensional array (a Bravais lattice) of atoms and molecules, with a single unit cell repeated indefinitely, along with other developments in the early days of physical crystallography. After Max von Laue demonstrated in 1912 that x-rays diffract, fairly quickly William Lawrence Bragg and his father William Henry Bragg were able to solve previously unknown structures. Building on this, it became clear that most of the simple elemental metals had close packed structures. With this determined the concept of dislocations originally developed by Vito Volterra in 1907 became accepted, for instance being used to explain the ductility of metals by G. I. Taylor in 1934.

The second was the advent of quantum mechanics. In 1924 Louis de Broglie in his PhD thesis Recherches sur la théorie des quanta introduced his theory of electron waves. This rapidly became part of what was called by Erwin Schrödinger undulatory mechanics, now called the Schrödinger equation, wave mechanics or more commonly in contemporary usage quantum mechanics. While it was not so easy to solve the mathematics in the early days, fairly rapidly ideas such as the chemical bond terminology of Linus Pauling as well as electronic band structure concepts were developed.

Filling of the electronic states in various types of materials at equilibrium. Here, height is energy while width is the density of available states for a certain energy in the material listed. The shade follows the Fermi–Dirac distribution (black: all states filled, white: no state filled). In metals and semimetals the Fermi level E_{F} lies inside at least one band. In insulators and semiconductors the Fermi level is inside a band gap; however, in semiconductors the bands are near enough to the Fermi level to be thermally populated with electrons or holes. "intrin." indicates intrinsic semiconductors.

From this the concept of nonmetals as "not-a-metal" originates. The original approach to describe metals and nonmetals was a band-structure with delocalized electrons (i.e. spread out in space). A nonmetal has a gap in the energy levels of the electrons at the Fermi level. In contrast, a metal would have at least one partially occupied band at the Fermi level; in a semiconductor or insulator there are no delocalized states at the Fermi level, see for instance Ashcroft and Mermin. (A semimetal is similar to a metal, with a slightly more complex band structure.) These definitions are equivalent to stating that metals conduct electricity at absolute zero, as suggested by Nevill Francis Mott, and the equivalent definition at other temperatures is also commonly used in work on metal–insulator transitions.

Originally this band structure interpretation was based upon a single-electron approach with the Fermi level in the band gap as illustrated in the Figure, not including a complete picture of the many-body problem where both exchange and correlation terms matter, as well as relativistic effects such as spin-orbit coupling. For instance, the passivity of gold is typically associated with relativistic terms. A key addition by Mott and Rudolf Peierls was that these could not be ignored. For instance, nickel oxide would be a metal if a single-electron approach was used, but in fact has quite a large band gap. As of 2024 it is more common to use an approach based upon density functional theory where the many-body terms are included. Although accurate calculations remain a challenge, reasonable results are now available in many cases.

It is common to nuance the early definition of Alan Herries Wilson and Mott which was for a zero temperature. As discussed by Peter Edwards and colleagues, as well as Fumiko Yonezawa,it is important to consider the temperatures at which both metals and nonmetals are used. Yonezawa provides a general definition for both general temperatures and conditions (such as standard temperature and pressure):

When a material conducts and at the same time the temperature coefficient of the electric conductivity of that material is not positive under a certain environmental condition, the material is metallic under that environmental condition. A material which does not satisfy these requirements is not metallic under that environmental condition.

The precise meaning of semiconductor needs a little care. In terms of the temperature dependence of their conductivity they are all classified as insulators; the pure forms are intrinsic semiconductors. When they are doped their conductivity continues to increase with temperature, and can become substantial; hence the ambiguities with an empirical categorisation using conductivity described earlier. Indeed, some elements that are normally considered as insulators have been exploited as semiconductors. For instance diamond, which has the largest band gap of the elements that are solids under normal conditions, has a number of semiconductor applications.

Band structure definitions of metals and nonmetals are widely used in current research into materials, and apply both to single elements such as insulating boron as well as compounds such as strontium titanate. The characteristics associated with metals and nonmetals in early work such as their appearance and mechanical properties are now understood to be consequences of how the atoms and electrons are arranged.

== Comparison of selected properties ==
The two tables in this section list some of the properties of five types of elements (noble gases, halogen nonmetals, unclassified nonmetals, metalloids and, for comparison, metals) based on their most stable forms at standard temperature and pressure. The dashed lines around the columns for metalloids signify that the treatment of these elements as a distinct type can vary depending on the author, or classification scheme in use.

=== Physical properties by element type ===
Physical properties are listed in loose order of ease of their determination.

Property	Element type				
Property	Metals	Metalloids	Unc. nonmetals	Halogen nonmetals	Noble gases
General physical appearance	lustrous	lustrous	◇ lustrous: carbon, phosphorus, selenium; ◇ colored: sulfur; ◇ colorless: hydrogen, nitrogen, oxygen	◇ lustrous: iodine; ◇ colored: fluorine, chlorine, bromine	colorless
Form and density	solid (Hg liquid)	solid	solid or gas	solid or gas (bromine liquid)	gas
Form and density	often high density such as iron, lead, tungsten	low to moderately high density	low density	low density	low density
Form and density	some light metals including beryllium, magnesium, aluminium	all lighter than iron	hydrogen, nitrogen lighter than air	low density	helium, neon lighter than air
Plasticity	mostly malleable and ductile	often brittle	phosphorus, sulfur, selenium, brittle (Note: All four have less stable non-brittle forms: carbon as exfoliated (expanded) graphite, and as carbon nanotube wire; phosphorus as white phosphorus (soft as wax, pliable and can be cut with a knife, at room temperature); sulfur as plastic sulfur; and selenium as selenium wires.)	iodine brittle	not applicable
Electrical conductivity	good (Note: Metals have electrical conductivity values of from 6.9×10^{3} S•cm^{−1} for manganese to 6.3×10^{5} for silver.)	◇ moderate: boron, silicon, germanium, tellurium; ◇ good: arsenic, antimony (Note: Metalloids have electrical conductivity values of from 1.5×10^{−6} S•cm^{−1} for boron to 3.9×10^{4} for arsenic.)	◇ poor: hydrogen, nitrogen, oxygen, sulfur; ◇ moderate: phosphorus, selenium; ◇ good: carbon (Note: Unclassified nonmetals have electrical conductivity values of from ca. 1×10^{−18} S•cm^{−1} for the elemental gases to 3×10^{4} in graphite.)	◇ poor: fluorine, chlorine, bromine; ◇ moderate: I (Note: Halogen nonmetals have electrical conductivity values of from ca. 1×10^{−18} S•cm^{−1} for F and Cl to 1.7×10^{−8} S•cm^{−1} for iodine.)	poor (Note: Elemental gases have electrical conductivity values of ca. 1×10^{−18} S•cm^{−1}.)
Electronic structure	metal (beryllium, strontium, α-tin, ytterbium, bismuth are semimetals)	semimetal (arsenic, antimony) or semiconductor	◇ semimetal: carbon; ◇ semiconductor: phosphorus; ◇ insulator: hydrogen, nitrogen, oxygen, sulfur	semiconductor (I) or insulator	insulator

=== Chemical properties by element type ===
Chemical properties are listed from general characteristics to more specific details.

Property	Element type				
Property	Metals	Metalloids	Unc. nonmetals	Halogen nonmetals	Noble gases
General chemical behavior	◇ strong to weakly metallic; ◇ noble metals are relatively inert	weakly nonmetallic (Note: Metalloids always give "compounds less acidic in character than the corresponding compounds of the [typical] nonmetals.")	moderately nonmetallic	strongly nonmetallic	◇ inert to nonmetallic; ◇ radon shows some cationic behavior
Oxides	basic; some amphoteric or acidic	amphoteric or weakly acidic (Note: Arsenic trioxide reacts with sulfur trioxide, forming arsenic "sulfate" As_{2}(SO_{4})_{3}. This substance is covalent in nature rather than ionic; it is also given as As_{2}O_{3}·3SO_{3}.)	acidic (Note: NO_{2}, N_{2}O_{5}, SO_{3}, SeO_{3} are strongly acidic.) or neutral (Note: H_{2}O, CO, NO, N_{2}O are neutral oxides; CO and N_{2}O are "formally the anhydrides of formic and hyponitrous acid, respectively viz. CO + H_{2}O → H_{2}CO_{2} (HCOOH, formic acid); N_{2}O + H_{2}O → H_{2}N_{2}O_{2} (hyponitrous acid).")	acidic (Note: ClO_{2}, Cl_{2}O_{7}, I_{2}O_{5} are strongly acidic.)	metastable XeO_{3} is acidic; stable XeO_{4} strongly so
Oxides	few glass formers (Note: Metals that form glasses are: vanadium; molybdenum, tungsten; alumnium, indium, thallium; tin, lead; and bismuth.)	all glass formers	some glass formers (Note: Unclassified nonmetals that form glasses are phosphorus, sulfur, selenium; CO_{2} forms a glass at 40 GPa.)	no glass formers reported	no glass formers reported
Oxides	ionic, polymeric, layer, chain, and molecular structures	polymeric in structure	◇ mostly molecular; ◇ carbon, phosphorus, sulfur, selenium have 1+ polymeric forms	◇ mostly molecular; ◇ iodine has a polymeric form, I_{2}O_{5}	◇ mostly molecular; ◇ XeO_{2} is polymeric
Compounds with metals	alloys or intermetallic compounds	tend to form alloys or intermetallic compounds	◇ salt-like to covalent or metallic: hydrogen†, carbon, nitrogen, phosphorus, sulfur, selenium; ◇ mainly ionic: oxygen	mainly ionic	simple compounds at STP not known (Note: Disodium helide (Na_{2}He) is a compound of helium and sodium that is stable at high pressures above 113 GPa. Argon forms an alloy with nickel, at 140 GPa and close to 1,500 K, however at this pressure argon is no longer a noble gas.)
Ionization energy (kJ mol^{−1})‡	low to high	moderate	moderate to high	high	high to very high
Ionization energy (kJ mol^{−1})‡	376 to 1,007	762 to 947	941 to 1,402	1,008 to 1,681	1,037 to 2,372
Ionization energy (kJ mol^{−1})‡	average 643	average 833	average 1,152	average 1,270	average 1,589
Electronegativity (Pauling) (Note: Values for the noble gases are from Rahm, Zeng and Hoffmann.)‡	low to high	moderate	moderate to high	high	high (radon) to very high
Electronegativity (Pauling)‡	0.7 to 2.54	1.9 to 2.18	2.19 to 3.44	2.66 to 3.98	ca. 2.43 to 4.7
Electronegativity (Pauling)‡	average 1.5	average 2.05	average 2.65	average 3.19	average 3.3

† Hydrogen can also form alloy-like hydrides
‡ The labels low, moderate, high, and very high are arbitrarily based on the value spans listed in the table

== See also ==
- CHON (carbon, hydrogen, oxygen, nitrogen)
- List of nonmetal monographs
- Metallization pressure
- Nonmetal (astrophysics)
- Period 1 elements (hydrogen & helium)
- Properties of nonmetals (and metalloids) by group
