= List of nonmetal monographs =

The purpose of this annotated list is to provide a chronological, consolidated list of nonmetal monographs, which could enable the interested reader to further trace classification approaches in this area. Those marked with a ▲ classify these 14 elements as nonmetals: H, N; O, S; the 4 stable halogens; and the 6 naturally occurring noble gases.

- Steudel R 2020, Chemistry of the Non-metals: Syntheses - Structures - Bonding - Applications, in collaboration with D Scheschkewitz, Berlin, Walter de Gruyter, doi:10.1515/9783110578065. ▲
  An updated translation of the 5th German edition of 2013, incorporating the literature up to Spring 2019. Twenty-three nonmetals, including B, C, Si, Ge, As, Se, Te, and At but not Sb (nor Po). The nonmetals are identified on the basis of their electrical conductivity at absolute zero putatively being close to zero, rather than finite as in the case of metals. That does not work for As however, which has the electronic structure of a semimetal (like Sb).
- Halka M & Nordstrom B 2010, "Nonmetals", Facts on File, New York, ISBN 978-0-8160-7367-2
  A reading level 9+ book covering H, C, N, O, P, S, Se. Complementary books by the same authors examine (a) the post-transition metals (Al, Ga, In, Tl, Sn, Pb and Bi) and metalloids (B, Si, Ge, As, Sb, Te and Po); and (b) the halogens and noble gases.
- Woolins JD 1988, Non-Metal Rings, Cages and Clusters, John Wiley & Sons, Chichester, ISBN 978-0-471-91592-8.
  A more advanced text that covers H; B; C, Si, Ge; N, P, As, Sb; O, S, Se and Te.
- Steudel R 1977, Chemistry of the Non-metals: With an Introduction to Atomic Structure and Chemical Bonding, English edition by FC Nachod & JJ Zuckerman, Berlin, Walter de Gruyter, ISBN 978-3-11-004882-7. ▲
  Twenty-four nonmetals, including B, Si, Ge, As, Se, Te, Po and At.
- Powell P & Timms PL 1974, The Chemistry of the Non-metals, Chapman & Hall, London, ISBN 978-0-470-69570-8. ▲
  Twenty-two nonmetals including B, Si, Ge, As and Te. Tin and antimony are shown as being intermediate between metals and nonmetals; they are later shown as either metals or nonmetals. Astatine is counted as a metal.
- Emsley J 1971, The Inorganic Chemistry of the Non-metals, Methuen Educational, London, ISBN 978-0-423-86120-4. ▲
  Twenty nonmetals. H is placed over F; B and Si are counted as nonmetals; Ge, As, Sb and Te are counted as metalloids.
- Johnson RC 1966, Introductory Descriptive Chemistry: Selected Nonmetals, their Properties, and Behavior, WA Benjamin, New York. ▲
  Eighteen nonmetals. H is shown floating over B and C. Silicon, Ge, As, Sb, Te, Po and At are shown as semimetals. At is later shown as a nonmetal (p. 133).
- Jolly WL 1966, The Chemistry of the Non-metals, Prentice-Hall, Englewood Cliffs, New Jersey. ▲
  Twenty-four nonmetals, including B, Si, Ge, As, Sb, Te and At. H is placed over F.
- Sherwin E & Weston GJ 1966, Chemistry of the Non-metallic Elements, Pergamon Press, Oxford. ▲
  Twenty-three nonmetals. H is shown over Li and F; Germanium, As, Se, and Te are later referred to as metalloids; Sb is shown as a nonmetal but later referred to as a metal. They write, "Whilst these heavier elements [Se and Te] look metallic they show the chemical properties of non-metals and therefore come into the category of "metalloids" (p. 64).
- Phillips CSG & Williams RJP 1965, Inorganic Chemistry, vol. 1, Principles and non-metals, Oxford University Press, Clarendon. ▲
  Twenty-three nonmetals, excluding Sb, including At. An advanced work for its time, presenting inorganic chemistry as the difficult and complex subject it was, with many novel insights.
- Yost DM & Russell Jr, H 1946 Systematic Inorganic Chemistry of the Fifth-and-Sixth-Group Nonmetallic Elements, Prentice-Hall, New York, accessed August 8, 2021.
  Includes tellurium as a nonmetallic element.
- Bailey GH 1918, The Tutorial Chemistry, Part 1: The Non-Metals, 4th ed., W Briggs (ed.), University Tutorial Press, London.
  Fourteen nonmetals (excl. the noble gases), including B, Si, Se, and Te. The author writes that arsenic and antimony resemble metals in their luster and conductivity of heat and electricity but that in their chemical properties they resemble the non-metals, since they form acidic oxides and insoluble in dilute mineral acids; "such elements are called metalloids" (p. 530).
- Appleton JH 1897, The Chemistry of the Non-metals: An Elementary Text-Book for Schools and Colleges, Snow & Farnham Printers, Providence, Rhode Island
  Eighteen nonmetals: He, Ar; F, Cl, Br, I; O, S, Se, Te; N, P, As, Sb; C, Si; B; H. Neon, germanium, krypton and xenon are listed as new or doubtful elements. For Sb, Appleton writes:

"Antimony is sometimes classed as a metal, sometimes as a non-metal. In case of several other elements the question of classification is difficult—indeed, the classification is one of convenience, in a sense, more than one of absolute scientific certainty. In some of its relations, especially its physical properties, antimony resembles the well-defined metals—in its chemical relations, it falls into the group containing boron, nitrogen, phosphorus, arsenic, well-defined non-metals." (p. 166).

- Thorpe TE 1896, A Manual of Inorganic Chemistry, vol. 1, The Non-Metals, William Collins, Sons, & Co., London, p. 37
  Sixteen nonmetals: Ar; F, Cl, Br, I; O, S, Se, Te; N, P, As; C, Si; B; H.
  "In its chemical characters, antimony is closely allied to arsenic on the one hand, and to bismuth on the other; it constitutes, indeed, a connecting link between the metals and the non-metals." (p. 442)
- Roscoe HE & Schorlemmer C 1891, A Treatise on Chemistry, Vol. 1 The Nonmetallic Elements, D Appleton and Company, New York
  Fifteen nonmetals: H, B, C, Si, N, P, As, O, S, Se, Te, F, Cl, Br, I.
- Appleton JH 1888, Beginners' Hand-book of Chemistry: The Subject Developed by Facts and Principles Drawn Chiefly from the Non-metals, Chautauqua Press, New York.
  Fifteen nonmetals including B, Si, As, Sb and Se (the six noble gases were not then known; Ge had only been discovered in 1886). Te is shown in a list of the chemical elements but not mentioned elsewhere.
- Gmelin L 1849, Handbook of Chemistry, vol. 2, Non-metallic elements, H Watts (trans.), Cavendish Society, London.
  Twelve nonmetals (then called "metalloids"): H, B, C, N, O, F, P, S, Cl, Se, Br, I.
