= Glass formation =

A glass is an amorphous solid completely lacking long range periodic atomic structure that exhibits a region of glass transformation. This broad definition means that any material, be it organic, inorganic, metallic, etc., in nature may form a glass if it exhibits glass transformation behavior. However prior to 1900 very few non-silicate glasses were known and the theories developed were consequently heavily influenced by existing observations of silicate melts (compounds containing silicon and oxygen). These theories are grouped under the heading of structural theories of glass formation. In later years many non-silicate glasses were discovered and it is recognized today that almost any material is capable of forming a glass given the right experimental conditions and focus has changed from "which materials will form a glass" to "under what conditions will a particular material form a glass". More recent theories focus on the kinetics behind the formation of glass and these kinetic theories of glass formation have largely replaced earlier structural theories.

== Structural theories of glass formation ==
Among the first structural theories of glass formation was that which was developed by Goldschmidt who stated that glasses of the general formula R_{n}O_{m} will form glasses when the ratio of the ionic radii of the cation to the oxygen is in the range of 0.2 to 0.4. When this condition is true the cation tends to be bonded to 4 oxygen atoms and have a tetrahedral coordination. As such, Goldschmidt concluded from this that only cations with tetrahedral coordination would form glasses on cooling. The conclusion was empirical, and no attempt was made to explain this observation by Goldschmidt at the time of its initial proposal.

The ideas of Goldschmidt were extended by Zachariasen who attempted to explain why certain coordination numbers would favor glass formation. He noted that silicates which formed glasses rather than recrystallizing after melting and cooling formed network structures consisting of tetrahedra joined at all four corners in a non-periodic non-symmetric manner (unlike crystals which are periodic and symmetrical. These networks extend in all three dimensions in a manner such that the average behavior of the glass is identical - the properties of the glass are isotropic. Using this as his basis Zachariasen concluded that the ability to form a glass was dependent on the ability to form these networks. He then went on to explain the necessary conditions for forming such a network, which he defined as follows:

1. An oxygen atom cannot be connected to more than two cations, otherwise the variation in bond angles required to form a non-periodic network cannot be achieved.
2. The number of oxygen atoms must be small, either 3 or 4, which was an empirically determined condition based on the fact that the only glasses known at the time were formed from either triangular or tetrahedrally coordinated cations.
3. At least 3 corners of a polyhedron must be shared in order to yield a 3-dimensional structure and the polyhedra may only be joined at the corners (they do not share edges or faces).

He also stated that the melt must be cooled under appropriate conditions in order for glass formation to occur, anticipating later kinetic theories of glass formation. Other statements of Zachariasen were used as the basis for a class of glass formation models known as random network theory. However, in his original work, Zachariasen did not use the term "random network," preferring instead to use "vitreous network," as the structure is not truly random and is constrained by minimum distances between atoms. As a consequence, not all inter-nuclear distances are equally probable, and observed X-ray patterns for glasses are a consequence of a vitreous network.

Other structural theories of glass formation focused on the nature of the bonds between cations and anions. For example, Smekal suggested that only bonds which are intermediate in nature, lying between purely ionic and purely covalent in a melt, would allow for the formation of glass. He suggested this on the basis that ionic bonds lack the directionality required to form a network and that covalent bonds would enforce strict bond angles, preventing the variation required for the formation of a non-periodic network. Stanworth attempted to better quantify this mixed bond concept and divided oxides into three groups on the basis of electronegativity of the cation. The groups were as follows:

1. network formers: cations which form bonds to oxygen with nearly 50% ionic character produce good glasses
2. intermediates: form slightly more ionic bonds with oxygen. Although they cannot form glasses themselves, they can partially replace cations of the network-former class.
3. modifiers: cations with very low electronegativities which form highly ionic bonds with oxygen; these never act as network formers and can only modify structures created by network formers.

Bond strength was also suggested as an important factor in the formation of glasses. Sun argued that strong bonds were important for the formation of glasses as they prevent the reorganization of the material into a crystal structure during cooling, therefore facilitating glass formation. The bond strength he referred to could be given by the energy required to dissociate an oxide structure in the gaseous phase divided by the number of bonds. Although this model yielded results that were compatible with previous observations, it yielded no new insights into the formation of glass. Rawson argued that Sun ignored the importance of temperature in his model suggesting that higher melting points yields more energy for bond disruption whilst low temperatures afford less energy. He argued that a material with a low melting temperature and high bond strength would be a better glass former than a one with a similar bond strength but a much higher melting point. Although the application of this model to single cation oxides does little to improve the results of the application of the Sun model, it does predict the excellent glass forming property of boric oxide and extension to binary and ternary systems yields the prediction that the ease of glass formation should be improved for compositions near eutectics. This observation has often been made and is dubbed the "liquidus temperature effect". An example of this is the glass formation of the CaO-Al_{2}O_{3} binary in a region near a eutectic.

== Kinetic theories of glass formation ==
The structural theories of glass formation only consider the relative ease of glass formation. Materials that form glasses under a moderate cooling rate are called good glass formers, those that require a rapid cooling rate are called poor glass formers, and those that require extreme cooling rates are referred to as non-glass formers. As it is now recognized that nearly any material is capable of forming a glass given the correct experimental conditions, the focus of kinetic theories of glass formation is to identify how fast a system must be cooled to form a glass and avoid detectable crystallization, rather than whether or not a system will form a glass.
