= Kainosymmetry =

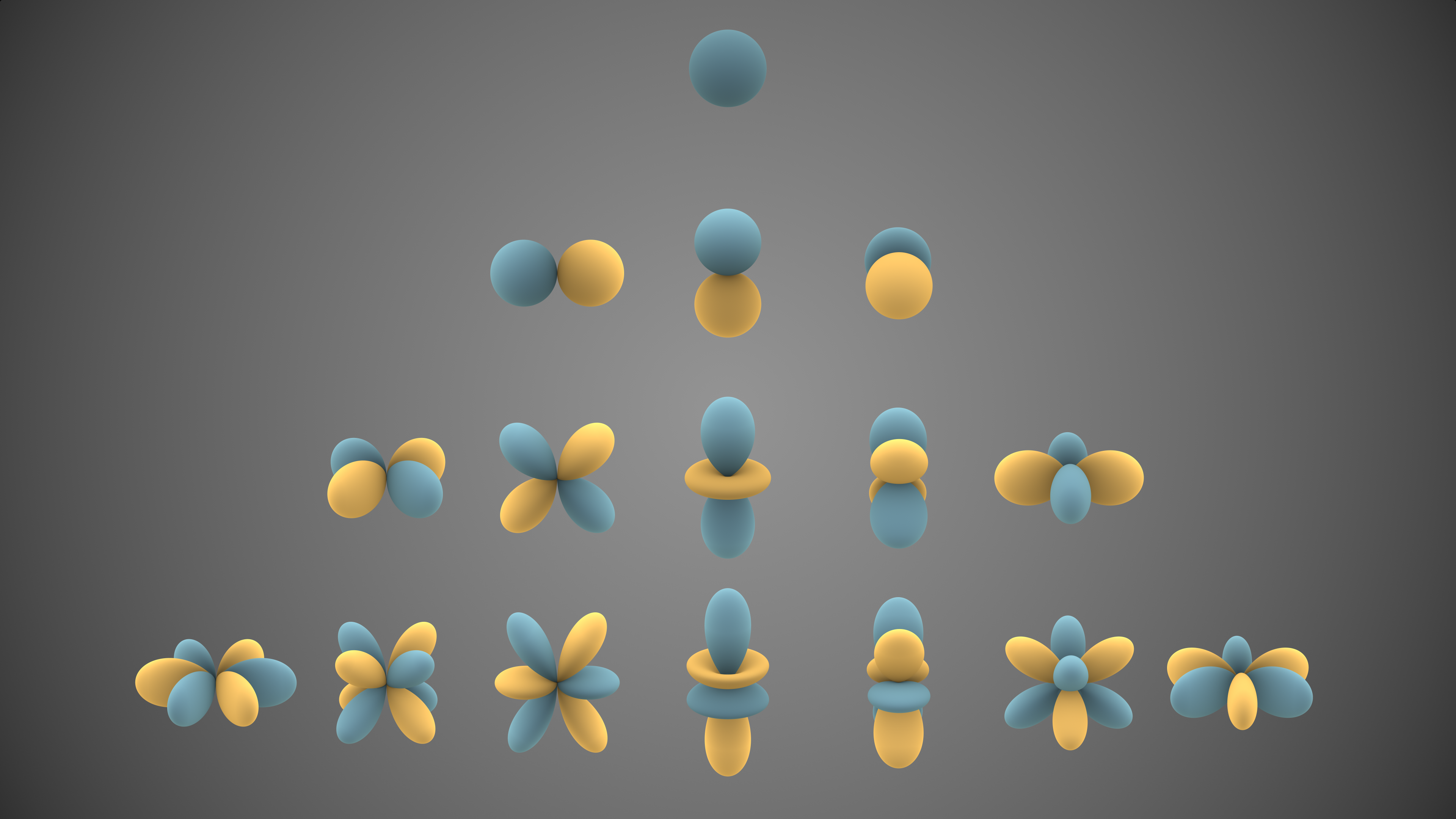
The four kainosymmetric orbital types filled among the known elements, one per row: 1s, 2p, 3d, 4f.

Kainosymmetry (from Greek καινός "new") describes the first atomic orbital of each azimuthal quantum number (ℓ). Such orbitals include 1s, 2p, 3d, 4f, 5g, and so on. The term kainosymmetric was coined by Sergey Shchukarev. Pekka Pyykkö referred to such orbitals as primogenic instead. Such orbitals are much smaller than all other orbitals with the same ℓ and have no radial nodes, giving the elements that fill them special properties. They are usually less metallic than their heavier homologues, prefer lower oxidation states, and have smaller atomic and ionic radii.

Contractions such as the scandide contraction and lanthanide contraction may be considered to be a general incomplete shielding effect in terms of how they impact the properties of the succeeding elements. The kainosymmetric 2p, 3d, and 4f orbitals screen the nuclear charge incompletely, and therefore the valence electrons that fill immediately after the completion of such a core subshell are more tightly bound by the nucleus than would be expected. 1s is an exception, providing nearly complete shielding. This is in particular the reason why sodium has a first ionisation energy of 495.8 kJ/mol that is only slightly smaller than that of lithium, 520.2 kJ/mol, and why lithium acts as less electronegative than sodium in simple σ-bonded alkali metal compounds; sodium suffers an incomplete shielding effect from the preceding 2p elements, but lithium essentially does not.

Kainosymmetry also explains the specific properties of the 1s, 2p, 3d, and 4f elements. The 1s elements hydrogen and helium are extremely different from all others, because 1s is the only orbital that is completely unscreened from the nucleus, and there is no other orbital of similar energy for it to hybridise with (it also does not polarise easily). The 1s orbital of hydrogen binds to both (n−1)d and ns orbitals of transition elements, while most other ligands bind only to (n−1)d. The 2p subshell is small and of a similar radial extent as the 2s subshell, which facilitates orbital hybridisation. This does not work as well for the heavier p elements: for example, silicon in silane (SiH_{4}) shows approximate sp^{2} hybridisation, whereas carbon in methane (CH_{4}) shows an almost ideal sp^{3} hybridisation. The bonding in these nonorthogonal heavy p element hydrides is weakened; this situation worsens with more electronegative substituents as they magnify the difference in energy between the s and p subshells. The heavier p elements are often more stable in their higher oxidation states in organometallic compounds than in compounds with electronegative ligands. This follows Bent's rule: s character is concentrated in the bonds to the more electropositive substituents, while p character is concentrated in the bonds to the more electronegative substituents. Furthermore, the 2p elements prefer to participate in multiple bonding (observed in O=O and N≡N) to eliminate Pauli repulsion from the otherwise close s and p lone pairs: their π bonds are stronger and their single bonds weaker. (See double bond rule.) The small size of the 2p shell is also responsible for the extremely high electronegativities of the 2p elements.

The 3d elements show the opposite effect; the 3d orbitals are smaller than would be expected, with a radial extent similar to the 3p core shell, which weakens bonding to ligands because they cannot overlap with the ligands' orbitals well enough. These bonds are therefore stretched and therefore weaker compared to the homologous ones of the 4d and 5d elements (the 5d elements show an additional d-expansion due to relativistic effects). This also leads to low-lying excited states, which is probably related to the well-known fact that 3d compounds are often coloured (the light absorbed is visible). This also explains why the 3d contraction has a stronger effect on the following elements than the 4d or 5d ones do. As for the 4f elements, the difficulty that 4f has in being used for chemistry is also related to this, as are the strong incomplete screening effects; the 5g elements may show a similar contraction, but it is likely that relativistic effects will partly counteract this, as they would tend to cause expansion of the 5g shell.

Another consequence is the increased metallicity of the following elements in a block after the first kainosymmetric orbital, along with a preference for higher oxidation states. This is visible comparing H and He (1s) with Li and Be (2s); N–F (2p) with P–Cl (3p); Fe and Co (3d) with Ru and Rh (4d); and Nd–Dy (4f) with U–Cf (5f). As kainosymmetric orbitals appear in the even rows (except for 1s), this creates an even–odd difference between periods from period 2 onwards: elements in even periods are smaller and have more oxidising higher oxidation states (if they exist), whereas elements in odd periods differ in the opposite direction.

The difference between kainosymmetric elements and subsequent ones has been called the first-row anomaly. It has been used to argue that helium should be placed over beryllium in the periodic table rather than over neon, on the grounds that this would constitute the most extreme case of the first-row anomaly.
