= List of alternative nonmetal classes =

Non metallic elements

Metalloid	Unclassified nonmetal	Nonmetal halogen	Noble gas
B, Si, Ge, As, Sb, Te, Po, At	H, C, N, P, O, S, Se	F, Cl, Br, I	He, Ne, Ar, Kr, Xe, Rn
Polycrystalline β-boron chunks	Liquid oxygen in a glass beaker	Liquid bromine in a jar	A krypton-filled discharge tube glowing bluish-white

In chemistry, after nonmetallic elements such as silicon, chlorine, and helium are classed as either metalloids, halogens, or noble gases, the remaining unclassified nonmetallic elements are hydrogen, carbon, nitrogen, oxygen, phosphorus, sulfur and selenium.

The nonmetallic elements are sometimes instead divided into two to seven alternative classes or sets according to, for example, electronegativity; the relative homogeneity of the halogens; molecular structure; the peculiar nature of hydrogen; the corrosive nature of oxygen and the halogens; their respective groups; and variations thereupon.

== Classification science ==
Classes provided an economy of description and are beneficial to structuring knowledge and understanding of science. The distinction between classes is not absolute. Boundary overlaps can occur as outlying elements in each class show or begin to show less-distinct, hybrid-like, or atypical properties. As expressed by Nelson:

"…care needs to be taken to remember that…[this classification scheme] is only an approximation, and can only be used as a rough guide to the properties of the elements. Provided that this is done, however, it constitutes a very useful classification, and although purists often despise it because of its approximate nature, the fact is that practising chemists make a great deal of use of it, if only subconsciously, in thinking of the chemistry of different elements."

== Two classes ==
Reactive nonmetal	Noble gas
H, C, N, P, O, S, Se, F, Cl, Br, I	He, Ne, Ar, Kr, Xe, Rn

Rudakiya. The nonmetals are simply classified according to their inclination to form chemical compounds. The halogens are not distinguished.

== Three classes ==
Electronegative nonmetal	Very electronegative nonmetal	Noble gas
H, C, P, S, Se, I	N, O, F, Cl, Br	He, Ne, Ar, Kr, Xe, Rn

Wulfsberg. The nonmetals are divided based on a loose correlation between electronegativity and oxidizing power. Very electronegative nonmetals have electronegativity values over 2.8; electronegative nonmetals have values of 1.9 to 2.8.

Other nonmetal	Halogen	Noble gas
H, C, N, P, O, S, Se	F, Cl, Br, I	He, Ne, Ar, Kr, Xe, Rn

Polyatomic element	Diatomic element	Monatomic element (noble gas)
C, P, S, Se	H, N, O, F, Cl, Br, I	He, Ne, Ar, Kr, Xe, Rn

Bettelheim et al. The nonmetals are distinguished based on the molecular structures of their most thermodynamically stable forms in ambient conditions. Polyatomic nonmetals form structures or molecules in which each atom has two or three nearest neighbours (carbon: C_{x}; phosphorus: P_{4}; sulfur: S_{8}; selenium: Se_{x}); diatomic nonmetals form molecules in which each atom has one nearest neighbour (hydrogen: H_{2}; nitrogen: N_{2}; oxygen: O_{2}; fluorine: F_{2}; chlorine: Cl_{2}; bromine: Br_{2}; iodine: I_{2}); and the monatomic noble gases exist as isolated atoms (helium, neon, argon, krypton, xenon, radon) with no fixed nearest neighbour. This gradual reduction in the number of nearest neighbours corresponds (approximately) to a reduction in metallic character. A similar progression is seem among the metals. Metallic bonding tends to involve close-packed centrosymmetric structures with a high number of nearest neighbours. Post-transition metals and metalloids, sandwiched between the true metals and the nonmetals, tend to have more complex structures with an intermediate number of nearest neighbours

== Four classes ==
Hydrogen	Nonmetal	Halogen	Noble gas
H	C, N, P, O, S, Se	F, Cl, Br, I	He, Ne, Ar, Kr, Xe, Rn

Field & Gray. Hydrogen is placed by itself on account of it being "so different from all other elements". The remaining nonmetals are divided into nonmetals, halogens, and noble gases, with the unnamed class being distinguished by including nonmetals with relatively strong interatomic bonding, and the metalloids being effectively treated as a third super-class alongside metals and nonmetals.

Hydrogen	Carbon and other nonmetals	Halogen	Noble gas
H	C, N, P, O, S, Se	F, Cl, Br, I	He, Ne, Ar, Kr, Xe, Rn

Dinwiddle. A variant of Field & Gray in which carbon, nitrogen, oxygen, phosphorus, sulfur, and selenium are classified as carbon and other nonmetals.

Metalloid	Intermediate nonmetal	Corrosive nonmetal	Noble gas
B, Si, Ge, As, Sb, Te	H, C, N, P, S, Se	O, F, Cl, Br, I	He, Ne, Ar, Kr, Xe, Rn

Vernon. The nonmetals are divided into four classes that complement a four-fold division of the metals, with the noble metals treated as a subset of the transition metals. The metalloids are treated as chemically weak nonmetals, in a manner analogous to their chemically weak frontier metal counterparts.

== Five classes ==
Boroid	Organogen	Sulphuroid	Chloroid	Noble gas
B, Si	H, C, N, O	P, S, Se	F, Cl, Br, I	He, Ne, Ar, Kr, Xe, Rn

Dupasquier. Noble gases were not known in 1844 when this classification arrangement was published. Hydrogen, carbon, nitrogen and oxygen were grouped together on account of their occurrence in living things. Phosphorus, sulfur and selenium were characterised as being solid; volatile at an average temperature between 100 degrees and red heat; and combustible and flammable.

Hydrogen	Semiconductor	Other nonmetal	Halogen	Noble gas
H	B, Si, Ge, As, Sb, Te	C, N, P, O, S, Se	F, Cl, Br, I	He, Ne, Ar, Kr, Xe, Rn

Myers et al. Metalloids are labeled as semiconductors and carbon, nitrogen, oxygen, phosphorus, sulfur, selenium as other nonmetals.

Hydrogen	Metalloid	Nonmetal	Halogen	Noble gas
H	B, Si, Ge, As, Sb, Te, Po	C, N, P, O, S, Se	F, Cl, Br, I	He, Ne, Ar, Kr, Xe, Rn

Dingle. Hydrogen is again placed by itself on account of its uniqueness. The remaining nonmetals are divided into metalloids, nonmetals, (referred to as "quintessential nonmetals"), halogens, and noble gases. Since the metalloids abut the post-transition or "poor" metals, they might be renamed as "poor non-metals".

== Six or seven classes ==
Hydrogen	Group 13	Group 14	Pnictogen	Chalcogen	Halogen	Noble gas
H		C	N, P	O,S,Se	F,Cl,Br,I	He,Ne,Ar,Kr,Xe,Rn

Generic. After the relevant nonmetals are classified as either noble gases or halogens, the remainder are considered on a group-by-group basis. This results in six or seven sets of nonmetals, depending on the treatment of boron, which in some cases is regarded as a metalloid. The size of the group 14 set, and the sets of nonmetal pnictogens, chalcogens, and halogens will vary depending on how silicon, germanium, arsenic, antimony, selenium, tellurium, and astatine are treated. In some cases, the 2p nonmetals carbon, nitrogen, and oxygen, and other nonmetals are considered sufficiently different from their heavier congeners to warrant separate treatments. (Note: Greenwood and Earnshaw, for example, deal with the chemistry of the nonmetals over thirteen chapters: (i) hydrogen; (ii) boron; (iii) carbon; (iv) silicon; (v) germanium (and tin and lead); (vi) nitrogen; (vii) phosphorus; (viii) arsenic and antimony (and bismuth); (ix) oxygen; (x) sulfur; (xi) selenium and tellurium (and polonium); (xii) the halogens (F, Cl, Br, I, At); and (xiii) the noble gases.)
