= Metalloid =

Chemical element with metallic and nonmetallic properties

Elements recognized as metalloids
	13	14	15	16	17
2	B Boron	C Carbon	N Nitrogen	O Oxygen	F Fluorine
3	Al; Aluminium	Si; Silicon	P Phosphorus	S Sulfur	Cl; Chlorine
4	Ga; Gallium	Ge; Germanium	As; Arsenic	Se; Selenium	Br; Bromine
5	In; Indium	Sn; Tin	Sb; Antimony	Te; Tellurium	I Iodine
6	Tl; Thallium	Pb; Lead	Bi; Bismuth	Po; Polonium	At; Astatine
Commonly recognized (86–99%): B, Si, Ge, As, Sb, Te Irregularly recognized (40–49%): Po, At Less commonly recognized (24%): Se Rarely recognized (8–10%): C, Al (All other elements cited in less than 6% of sources) Arbitrary metal-nonmetal dividing line: between Be and B, Al and Si, Ge and As, Sb and Te, Po and At
Recognition status, as metalloids, of some elements in the p-block of the periodic table. Percentages are median appearance frequencies in the lists of metalloids. (Note: For a related commentary see also: Vernon RE 2013, 'Which Elements Are Metalloids?', Journal of Chemical Education, vol. 90, no. 12, pp. 1703–1707, doi:10.1021/ed3008457) The staircase-shaped line is a typical example of the arbitrary metal–nonmetal dividing line found on some periodic tables.

The word metalloid comes from the Latin metallum ("metal") and the Greek oeidḗs ("resembling in form or appearance"). However, there is no standard definition of a metalloid and no complete agreement on which elements are metalloids. Despite the lack of specificity, the term remains in use in the literature.

The six commonly recognised metalloids are boron, silicon, germanium, arsenic, antimony and tellurium. Five elements are less frequently so classified: carbon, aluminium, selenium, polonium and astatine. On a standard periodic table, all eleven elements are in a diagonal region of the p-block extending from boron at the upper left to astatine at lower right. Some periodic tables include a dividing line between metals and nonmetals, and the metalloids may be found close to this line.

Typical metalloids have a metallic appearance, may be brittle and are only fair conductors of electricity. They can form alloys with metals, and many of their other physical properties and chemical properties are intermediate between those of metallic and nonmetallic elements. They and their compounds are used in alloys, biological agents, catalysts, flame retardants, glasses, optical storage and optoelectronics, pyrotechnics, semiconductors, and electronics.

The term metalloid originally referred to nonmetals. Its more recent meaning, as a category of elements with intermediate or hybrid properties, became widespread in 1940–1960. Metalloids are sometimes called semimetals, a practice that has been discouraged, as the term semimetal has a more common usage as a specific kind of electronic band structure of a substance. In this context, only arsenic and antimony are semimetals, and commonly recognised as metalloids.

== Definitions ==
=== Judgment-based ===
A metalloid is an element that possesses a preponderance of properties in between, or that are a mixture of, those of metals and nonmetals, and which is therefore hard to classify as either a metal or a nonmetal. This is a generic definition that draws on metalloid attributes consistently cited in the literature. (Note: Definitions and extracts by different authors, illustrating aspects of the generic definition, follow: "In chemistry a metalloid is an element with properties intermediate between those of metals and nonmetals."; "Between the metals and nonmetals in the periodic table we find elements ... [that] share some of the characteristic properties of both the metals and nonmetals, making it difficult to place them in either of these two main categories"; "Chemists sometimes use the name metalloid ... for these elements which are difficult to classify one way or the other."; "Because the traits distinguishing metals and nonmetals are qualitative in nature, some elements do not fall unambiguously in either category. These elements ... are called metalloids ..."; More broadly, metalloids have been referred to as: "elements that ... are somewhat of a cross between metals and nonmetals"; or; "weird in-between elements".) Difficulty of categorisation is a key attribute. Most elements have a mixture of metallic and nonmetallic properties, and can be classified according to which set of properties is more pronounced. (Note: Gold, for example, has mixed properties but is still recognised as "king of metals". Besides metallic behaviour (such as high electrical conductivity, and cation formation), gold shows nonmetallic behaviour: It has the highest electrode potential; It has the third-highest ionization energy among the metals (after zinc and mercury); It has the highest electron affinity; Its electronegativity of 2.54 is highest among the metals and exceeds that of some nonmetals (hydrogen 2.2; phosphorus 2.19; and radon 2.2); It forms the Au^{−} auride anion, acting in this way like a halogen; It sometimes has a tendency, known as "aurophilicity", to bond to itself.; On halogen character, see also Belpassi et al., who conclude that in the aurides MAu (M = Li–Cs) gold "behaves as a halogen, intermediate between Br and I"; on aurophilicity, see also Schmidbaur and Schier.) Only the elements at or near the margins, lacking a sufficiently clear preponderance of either metallic or nonmetallic properties, are classified as metalloids.

Boron, silicon, germanium, arsenic, antimony, and tellurium are commonly recognised as metalloids. (Note: Mann et al. refer to these elements as "the recognized metalloids".) Depending on the author, one or more from selenium, polonium, or astatine are sometimes added to the list. Boron sometimes is excluded, by itself, or with silicon. Sometimes tellurium is not regarded as a metalloid. The inclusion of antimony, polonium, and astatine as metalloids has been questioned.

Several other elements are occasionally classified as metalloids. These elements include hydrogen, beryllium, nitrogen, phosphorus, sulfur, zinc, gallium, tin, iodine, lead, bismuth, radon, flerovium, moscovium, livermorium, tennessine, and oganesson. However, due to relativistic effects and short half-lives, Fl to Og are hard to place into metalloids. The term metalloid has also been used for elements that exhibit metallic lustre and electrical conductivity, and that are amphoteric, such as arsenic, antimony, vanadium, chromium, molybdenum, tungsten, tin, lead, and aluminium. The p-block metals, and nonmetals (such as carbon or nitrogen) that can form alloys with metals or modify their properties have also occasionally been considered as metalloids.

=== Criteria-based ===
Element	IE (kcal/mol)	IE (kJ/mol)	EN	Band structure
Boron	191	801	2.04	semiconductor
Silicon	188	787	1.90	semiconductor
Germanium	182	762	2.01	semiconductor
Arsenic	226	944	2.18	semimetal
Antimony	199	831	2.05	semimetal
Tellurium	208	869	2.10	semiconductor
average	199	832	2.05	
The elements commonly recognised as metalloids, and their ionization energies (IE); electronegativities (EN, revised Pauling scale); and electronic band structures (most thermodynamically stable forms under ambient conditions).

No widely accepted definition of a metalloid exists, nor any division of the periodic table into metals, metalloids, and nonmetals; Hawkes questioned the feasibility of establishing a specific definition, noting that anomalies can be found in several attempted constructs. Classifying an element as a metalloid has been described by Sharp as "arbitrary".

The number and identities of metalloids depend on what classification criteria are used. Emsley recognised four metalloids (germanium, arsenic, antimony, and tellurium); James et al. listed twelve (Emsley's plus boron, carbon, silicon, selenium, bismuth, polonium, moscovium, and livermorium). On average, seven elements are included in such lists; individual classification arrangements tend to share common ground and vary in the ill-defined margins. (Note: The lack of a standard division of the elements into metals, metalloids, and nonmetals is not necessarily an issue. There is more or less a continuous progression from the metallic to the nonmetallic. A specified subset of this continuum could serve its particular purpose as well as any other.)

A single quantitative criterion such as electronegativity is commonly used, metalloids having electronegativity values from 1.8 or 1.9 to 2.2. Further examples include packing efficiency (the fraction of volume in a crystal structure occupied by atoms) and the Goldhammer–Herzfeld criterion ratio. The commonly recognised metalloids have packing efficiencies of between 34% and 41%. (Note: The packing efficiency of boron is 38%; silicon and germanium 34; arsenic 38.5; antimony 41; and tellurium 36.4. These values are lower than in most metals (80% of which have a packing efficiency of at least 68%), but higher than those of elements usually classified as nonmetals. (Gallium is unusual, for a metal, in having a packing efficiency of just 39%.) Other notable values for metals are 42.9 for bismuth and 58.5 for liquid mercury.) Packing efficiencies for nonmetals are: graphite 17%, sulfur 19.2, iodine 23.9, selenium 24.2, and black phosphorus 28.5.) The Goldhammer–Herzfeld ratio, roughly equal to the cube of the atomic radius divided by the molar volume, (Note: More specifically, the Goldhammer–Herzfeld criterion is the ratio of the force holding an individual atom's valence electrons in place with the forces on the same electrons from interactions between the atoms in the solid or liquid element. When the interatomic forces are greater than, or equal to, the atomic force, valence electron itinerancy is indicated and metallic behaviour is predicted. Otherwise nonmetallic behaviour is anticipated.) is a simple measure of how metallic an element is, the recognised metalloids having ratios from around 0.85 to 1.1 and averaging 1.0. (Note: As the ratio is based on classical arguments it does not accommodate the finding that polonium, which has a value of ~0.95, adopts a metallic (rather than covalent) crystalline structure, on relativistic grounds. Even so it offers a first order rationalization for the occurrence of metallic character amongst the elements.) Other authors have relied on, for example, atomic conductance (Note: Atomic conductance is the electrical conductivity of one mole of a substance. It is equal to electrical conductivity divided by molar volume.) or bulk coordination number.

Masterton and Slowinski used three criteria to describe the six elements commonly recognised as metalloids: metalloids have ionization energies around 200 kcal/mol (837 kJ/mol) and electronegativity values close to 2.0. They also said that metalloids are typically semiconductors, though antimony and arsenic (semimetals from a physics perspective) have electrical conductivities approaching those of metals. Selenium and polonium are suspected as not in this scheme, while astatine's status is uncertain. (Note: Selenium has an ionization energy (IE) of 225 kcal/mol (941 kJ/mol) and is sometimes described as a semiconductor. It has a relatively high 2.55 electronegativity (EN). Polonium has an IE of 194 kcal/mol (812 kJ/mol) and a 2.0 EN, but has a metallic band structure. Astatine has an IE of 215 kJ/mol (899 kJ/mol) and an EN of 2.2. Its electronic band structure is not known with any certainty.)

In this context, Vernon proposed that a metalloid is a chemical element that, in its standard state, has (a) the electronic band structure of a semiconductor or a semimetal; and (b) an intermediate first ionization potential "(say 750−1,000 kJ/mol)"; and (c) an intermediate electronegativity (1.9–2.2).

== Periodic table territory ==
Distribution and recognition status of elements classified as metalloids
1	2	12	13	14	15	16	17	18
H								He
Li	Be		B	C	N	O	F	Ne
Na	Mg		Al	Si	P	S	Cl	Ar
K	Ca	Zn	Ga	Ge	As	Se	Br	Kr
Rb	Sr	Cd	In	Sn	Sb	Te	I	Xe
Cs	Ba	Hg	Tl	Pb	Bi	Po	At	Rn
Fr	Ra	Cn	Nh	Fl	Mc	Lv	Ts	Og
Commonly (93%) to rarely (9%) recognised as a metalloid: B, C, Al, Si, Ge, As, Se, Sb, Te, Po, At Very rarely (1–5%): H, Be, P, S, Ga, Sn, I, Pb, Bi, Fl, Mc, Lv, Ts Sporadically: N, Zn, Rn Metal–nonmetal dividing line: between H and Li, Be and B, Al and Si, Ge and As, Sb and Te, Po and At, and Ts and Og
Periodic table extract showing groups 1–2 and 12–18, and a dividing line between metals and nonmetals. Percentages are median appearance frequencies in the list of metalloid lists. Sporadically recognised elements show that the metalloid net is sometimes cast very widely; although they do not appear in the list of metalloid lists, isolated references to their designation as metalloids can be found in the literature (as cited in this article).

=== Location ===
Metalloids lie on either side of the dividing line between metals and nonmetals. This can be found, in varying configurations, on some periodic tables. Elements to the lower left of the line generally display increasing metallic behaviour; elements to the upper right display increasing nonmetallic behaviour. When presented as a regular stairstep, elements with the highest critical temperature for their groups (Li, Be, Al, Ge, Sb, Po) lie just below the line.

=== Diagonal relationship ===
The metalloids illustrate an organizing principle of the periodic table called a diagonal relationship. The diagonal positioning of the metalloids represents an exception to the observation that elements with similar properties tend to occur in vertical groups. A related effect can be seen in other diagonal similarities between some elements and their lower right neighbours, specifically lithium-magnesium, beryllium-aluminium, and boron-silicon. Rayner-Canham has argued that these similarities extend to carbon-phosphorus, nitrogen-sulfur, and into three d-block series.

This relationship arises due to competing horizontal and vertical trends in the nuclear charge. Going along a period, the nuclear charge increases with atomic number as do the number of electrons. The additional pull on outer electrons as nuclear charge increases generally outweighs the screening effect of having more electrons. With some irregularities, atoms therefore become smaller, ionization energy increases, and there is a gradual change in character, across a period, from strongly metallic, to weakly metallic, to weakly nonmetallic, to strongly nonmetallic elements. Going down a main group, the effect of increasing nuclear charge is generally outweighed by the effect of additional electrons being further away from the nucleus. Atoms generally become larger, ionization energy falls, and metallic character increases. The net effect is that the location of the metal–nonmetal transition zone shifts to the right in going down a group.

=== Alternative treatments ===
Elements bordering the metal–nonmetal dividing line are not always classified as metalloids, noting a binary classification can facilitate the establishment of rules for determining bond types between metals and nonmetals. In such cases, the authors concerned focus on one or more attributes of interest to make their classification decisions, rather than being concerned about the marginal nature of the elements in question. Their considerations may or not be made explicit and may, at times, seem arbitrary. Metalloids may be grouped with metals; or regarded as nonmetals; or treated as a sub-category of nonmetals. (Note: Oderberg argues on ontological grounds that anything not a metal is therefore a nonmetal, and that this includes semi-metals (i.e. metalloids).) Other authors have suggested classifying some elements as metalloids "emphasizes that properties change gradually rather than abruptly as one moves across or down the periodic table". Some periodic tables distinguish elements that are metalloids and display no formal dividing line between metals and nonmetals. Metalloids are instead shown as occurring in a diagonal band or diffuse region. The key consideration is to explain the context for the taxonomy in use.

== Properties ==
Metalloids usually look like metals but behave largely like nonmetals. Physically, they are shiny, brittle solids with intermediate to relatively good electrical conductivity and the electronic band structure of a semimetal or semiconductor. Chemically, they mostly behave as (weak) nonmetals, have intermediate ionization energies and electronegativity values, and amphoteric or weakly acidic oxides. Most of their other physical and chemical properties are intermediate in nature.

=== Compared to metals and nonmetals ===
Characteristic properties of metals, metalloids, and nonmetals are summarized in the table. Physical properties are listed in order of ease of determination; chemical properties run from general to specific, and then to descriptive.

Properties of metals, metalloids and nonmetals
Physical property	Metals	Metalloids	Nonmetals
Form	solid; a few liquid at or near room temperature (Ga, Hg, Rb, Cs, Fr) (Note: Copernicium is reportedly the only metal thought to be a gas at room temperature.)	solid	majority gaseous
Appearance	lustrous (at least when freshly fractured)	lustrous	several colourless; others coloured, or metallic grey to black
Plasticity	typically elastic, ductile, malleable	often brittle	often brittle
Electrical conductivity	good to high (Note: Metals have electrical conductivity values of from 6.9 × 10^{3} S•cm^{−1} for manganese to 6.3 × 10^{5} for silver.)	intermediate to good (Note: Metalloids have electrical conductivity values of from 1.5 × 10^{−6} S•cm^{−1} for boron to 3.9 × 10^{4} for arsenic. If selenium is included as a metalloid the applicable conductivity range would start from ~10^{−9} to 10^{−12} S•cm^{−1}.)	poor to good (Note: Nonmetals have electrical conductivity values of from ~10^{−18} S•cm^{−1} for the elemental gases to 3 × 10^{4} in graphite.)
Band structure	metallic (Bi = semimetallic)	are semiconductors or, if not (As, Sb = semimetallic), exist in semiconducting forms	semiconductor or insulator
Chemical property	Metals	Metalloids	Nonmetals
General chemical behaviour	metallic	nonmetallic	nonmetallic
Ionization energy	relatively low	intermediate ionization energies, usually falling between those of metals and nonmetals	relatively high
Electronegativity	usually low	have electronegativity values close to 2 (revised Pauling scale) or within the range of 1.9–2.2 (Allen scale) (Note: Chedd defines metalloids as having electronegativity values of 1.8 to 2.2 (Allred-Rochow scale). He included boron, silicon, germanium, arsenic, antimony, tellurium, polonium, and astatine in this category. In reviewing Chedd's work, Adler described this choice as arbitrary, as other elements whose electronegativities lie in this range include copper, silver, phosphorus, mercury, and bismuth. He went on to suggest defining a metalloid as "a semiconductor or semimetal" and to include bismuth and selenium in this category.)	high
When mixed with metals	give alloys	can form alloys	ionic or interstitial compounds formed
Oxides	lower oxides basic; higher oxides increasingly acidic	amphoteric or weakly acidic	acidic

The above table reflects the hybrid nature of metalloids. The properties of form, appearance, and behaviour when mixed with metals are more like metals. Elasticity and general chemical behaviour are more like nonmetals. Electrical conductivity, band structure, ionization energy, electronegativity, and oxides are intermediate between the two.

== Common applications ==
The focus of this section is on the recognised metalloids. Elements less often recognised as metalloids are ordinarily classified as either metals or nonmetals; some of these are included here for comparative purposes.

Metalloids and their compounds are used in alloys, biological agents (toxicological, nutritional, and medicinal), catalysts, flame retardants, glasses (oxide and metallic), optical storage media and optoelectronics, pyrotechnics, semiconductors, and electronics. (Note: Olmsted and Williams commented that, "Until quite recently, chemical interest in the metalloids consisted mainly of isolated curiosities, such as the poisonous nature of arsenic and the mildly therapeutic value of borax. With the development of metalloid semiconductors, however, these elements have become among the most intensely studied".)

=== Alloys ===
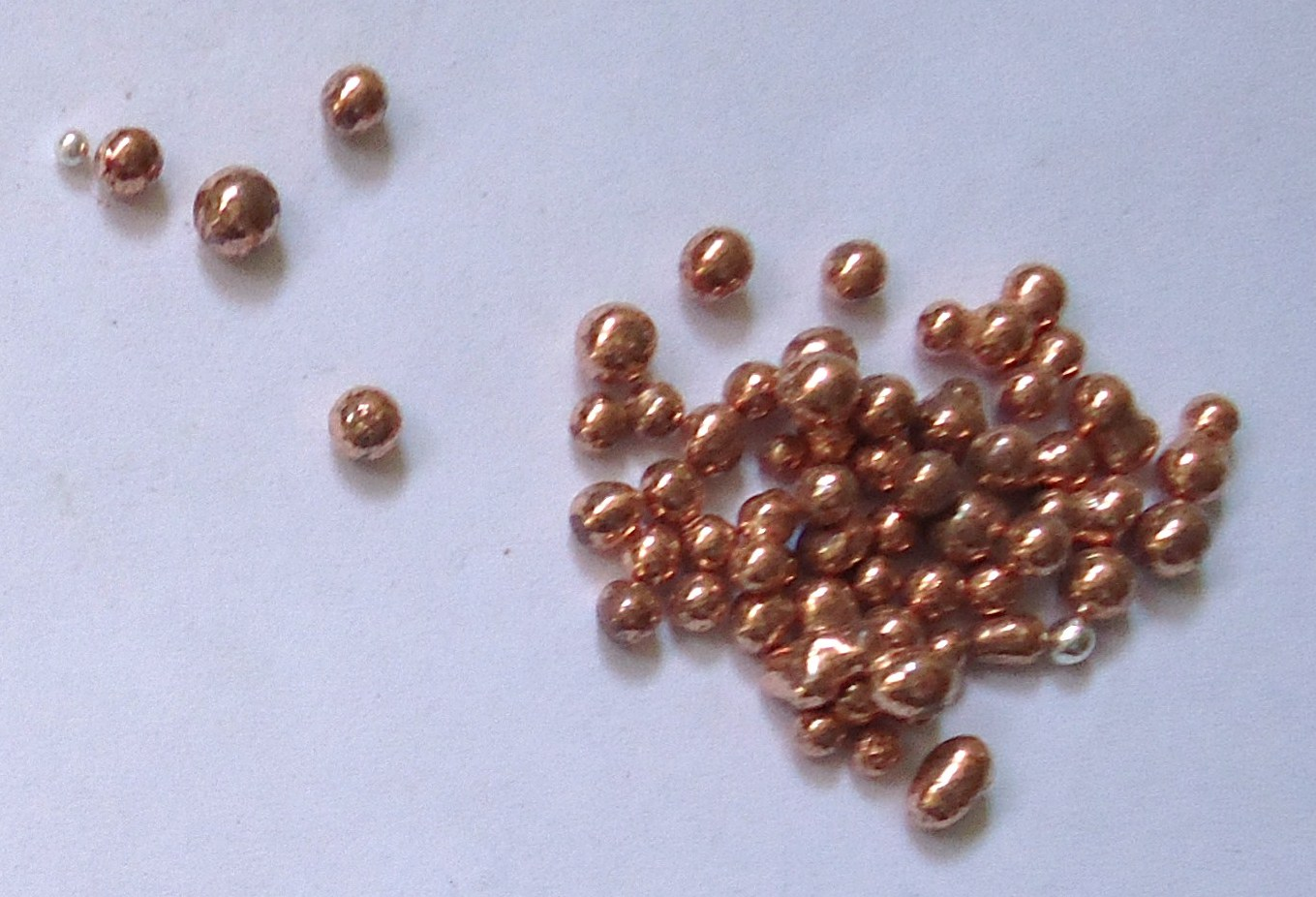
Copper-germanium alloy pellets, likely ~84% Cu; 16% Ge. When combined with silver the result is a tarnish resistant sterling silver. Also shown are two silver pellets.

Writing early in the history of intermetallic compounds, the British metallurgist Cecil Desch observed that "certain non-metallic elements are capable of forming compounds of distinctly metallic character with metals, and these elements may therefore enter into the composition of alloys". He associated silicon, arsenic, and tellurium, in particular, with the alloy-forming elements. Phillips and Williams suggested that compounds of silicon, germanium, arsenic, and antimony with B metals, "are probably best classed as alloys".

Among the lighter metalloids, alloys with transition metals are well-represented. Boron can form intermetallic compounds and alloys with such metals of the composition M_{n}B, if n > 2. Ferroboron (15% boron) is used to introduce boron into steel; nickel-boron alloys are ingredients in welding alloys and case hardening compositions for the engineering industry. Alloys of silicon with iron and with aluminium are widely used by the steel and automotive industries, respectively. Germanium forms many alloys, most importantly with the coinage metals.

The heavier metalloids continue the theme. Arsenic can form alloys with metals, including platinum and copper; it is also added to copper and its alloys to improve corrosion resistance and appears to confer the same benefit when added to magnesium. Antimony is well known as an alloy-former, including with the coinage metals. Its alloys include pewter (a tin alloy with up to 20% antimony) and type metal (a lead alloy with up to 25% antimony). Tellurium readily alloys with iron, as ferrotellurium (50–58% tellurium), and with copper, in the form of tellurium copper (40–50% tellurium). Ferrotellurium is used as a stabilizer for carbon in steel casting. Of the non-metallic elements less often recognised as metalloids, selenium – in the form of ferroselenium (50–58% selenium) – is used to improve the machinability of stainless steels.

=== Biological agents ===
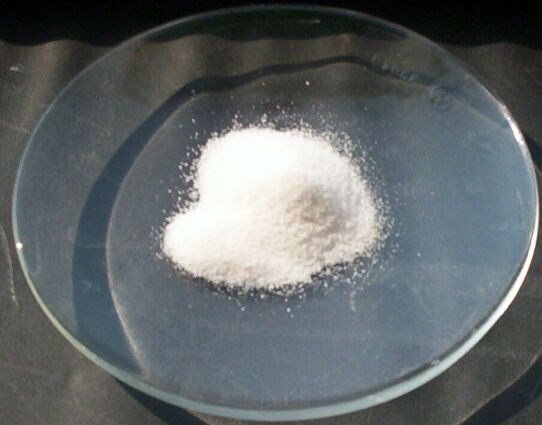
Arsenic trioxide or white arsenic, one of the most toxic and prevalent forms of arsenic. The antileukaemic properties of white arsenic were first reported in 1878.

All six of the elements commonly recognised as metalloids have toxic, dietary or medicinal properties. Arsenic and antimony compounds are especially toxic; boron, silicon, and possibly arsenic, are essential trace elements. Boron, silicon, arsenic, and antimony have medical applications, and germanium and tellurium are thought to have potential.

Boron is used in insecticides and herbicides. It is an essential trace element. As boric acid, it has antiseptic, antifungal, and antiviral properties.

Silicon is present in silatrane, a highly toxic rodenticide. Long-term inhalation of silica dust causes silicosis, a fatal disease of the lungs. Silicon is an essential trace element. Silicone gel can be applied to badly burned patients to reduce scarring.

Salts of germanium are potentially harmful to humans and animals if ingested on a prolonged basis. There is interest in the pharmacological actions of germanium compounds but no licensed medicine as yet.

Arsenic is notoriously poisonous and may also be an essential element in ultratrace amounts. During World War I, both sides used "arsenic-based sneezing and vomiting agents ... to force enemy soldiers to remove their gas masks before firing mustard or phosgene at them in a second salvo". It has been used as a pharmaceutical agent since antiquity, including for the treatment of syphilis before the development of antibiotics. Arsenic is also a component of melarsoprol, a medicinal drug used in the treatment of human African trypanosomiasis or sleeping sickness. In 2003, arsenic trioxide (under the trade name Trisenox) was re-introduced for the treatment of acute promyelocytic leukaemia, a cancer of the blood and bone marrow. Arsenic in drinking water, which causes lung and bladder cancer, has been associated with a reduction in breast cancer mortality rates.

Metallic antimony is relatively non-toxic, but most antimony compounds are poisonous. Two antimony compounds, sodium stibogluconate and stibophen, are used as antiparasitical drugs.

Elemental tellurium is not considered particularly toxic; two grams of sodium tellurate, if administered, can be lethal. People exposed to small amounts of airborne tellurium exude a foul and persistent garlic-like odour. Tellurium dioxide has been used to treat seborrhoeic dermatitis; other tellurium compounds were used as antimicrobial agents before the development of antibiotics. In the future, such compounds may need to be substituted for antibiotics that have become ineffective due to bacterial resistance.

Of the elements less often recognised as metalloids, beryllium and lead are noted for their toxicity; lead arsenate has been extensively used as an insecticide. Sulfur is one of the oldest of the fungicides and pesticides. Phosphorus, sulfur, zinc, selenium, and iodine are essential nutrients, and aluminium, tin, and lead may be. Sulfur, gallium, selenium, iodine, and bismuth have medicinal applications. Sulfur is a constituent of sulfonamide drugs, still widely used for conditions such as acne and urinary tract infections. Gallium nitrate is used to treat the side effects of cancer; gallium citrate, a radiopharmaceutical, facilitates imaging of inflamed body areas. Selenium sulfide is used in medicinal shampoos and to treat skin infections such as tinea versicolor. Iodine is used as a disinfectant in various forms. Bismuth is an ingredient in some antibacterials.

=== Catalysts ===
Boron trifluoride and trichloride are used as homogeneous catalysts in organic synthesis and electronics; the tribromide is used in the manufacture of diborane. Non-toxic boron ligands could replace toxic phosphorus ligands in some transition metal catalysts. Silica sulfuric acid (SiO_{2}OSO_{3}H) is used in organic reactions. Germanium dioxide is sometimes used as a catalyst in the production of PET plastic for containers; cheaper antimony compounds, such as the trioxide or triacetate, are more commonly employed for the same purpose despite concerns about antimony contamination of food and drinks. Arsenic trioxide has been used in the production of natural gas, to boost the removal of carbon dioxide, as have selenous acid and tellurous acid. Selenium acts as a catalyst in some microorganisms. Tellurium, its dioxide, and its tetrachloride are strong catalysts for air oxidation of carbon above 500 °C. Graphite oxide can be used as a catalyst in the synthesis of imines and their derivatives. Activated carbon and alumina have been used as catalysts for the removal of sulfur contaminants from natural gas. Titanium doped aluminium has been suggested as a substitute for noble metal catalysts used in the production of industrial chemicals.

=== Flame retardants ===
Compounds of boron, silicon, arsenic, and antimony have been used as flame retardants. Boron, in the form of borax, has been used as a textile flame retardant since at least the 18th century. Silicon compounds such as silicones, silanes, silsesquioxane, silica, and silicates, some of which were developed as alternatives to more toxic halogenated products, can considerably improve the flame retardancy of plastic materials. Arsenic compounds such as sodium arsenite or sodium arsenate are effective flame retardants for wood but have been less frequently used due to their toxicity. Antimony trioxide is a flame retardant. Aluminium hydroxide has been used as a wood-fibre, rubber, plastic, and textile flame retardant since the 1890s. Apart from aluminium hydroxide, use of phosphorus based flame-retardants – in the form of, for example, organophosphates – now exceeds that of any of the other main retardant types. These employ boron, antimony, or halogenated hydrocarbon compounds.

=== Glass formation ===
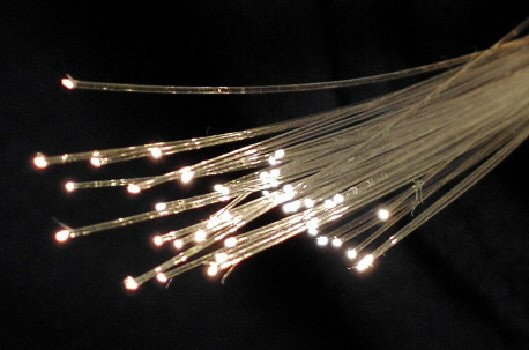
Optical fibers, usually made of pure silicon dioxide glass, with additives such as boron trioxide or germanium dioxide for increased sensitivity

The oxides B_{2}O_{3}, SiO_{2}, GeO_{2}, As_{2}O_{3}, and Sb_{2}O_{3} readily form glasses. TeO_{2} forms a glass but this requires a "heroic quench rate" or the addition of an impurity; otherwise the crystalline form results. These compounds are used in chemical, domestic, and industrial glassware and optics. Boron trioxide is used as a glass fibre additive, and is also a component of borosilicate glass, widely used for laboratory glassware and domestic ovenware for its low thermal expansion. Most ordinary glassware is made from silicon dioxide. Germanium dioxide is used as a glass fibre additive, as well as in infrared optical systems. Arsenic trioxide is used in the glass industry as a decolourizing and fining agent (for the removal of bubbles), as is antimony trioxide. Tellurium dioxide finds application in laser and nonlinear optics.

Amorphous metallic glasses are generally most easily prepared if one of the components is a metalloid or "near metalloid" such as boron, carbon, silicon, phosphorus or germanium. (Note: Research published in 2012 suggests that metal-metalloid glasses can be characterised by an interconnected atomic packing scheme in which metallic and covalent bonding structures coexist.) Aside from thin films deposited at very low temperatures, the first known metallic glass was an alloy of composition Au_{75}Si_{25} reported in 1960. A metallic glass having a strength and toughness not previously seen, of composition Pd_{82.5}P_{6}Si_{9.5}Ge_{2}, was reported in 2011.

Phosphorus, selenium, and lead, which are less often recognised as metalloids, are also used in glasses. Phosphate glass has a substrate of phosphorus pentoxide (P_{2}O_{5}), rather than the silica (SiO_{2}) of conventional silicate glasses. It is used, for example, to make sodium lamps. Selenium compounds can be used both as decolourising agents and to add a red colour to glass. Decorative glassware made of traditional lead glass contains at least 30% lead(II) oxide (PbO); lead glass used for radiation shielding may have up to 65% PbO. Lead-based glasses have also been extensively used in electronic components, enamelling, sealing and glazing materials, and solar cells. Bismuth based oxide glasses have emerged as a less toxic replacement for lead in many of these applications.

=== Optical storage and optoelectronics ===
Varying compositions of GeSbTe ("GST alloys") and Ag- and In- doped Sb_{2}Te ("AIST alloys"), being examples of phase-change materials, are widely used in rewritable optical discs and phase-change memory devices. By applying heat, they can be switched between amorphous (glassy) and crystalline states. The change in optical and electrical properties can be used for information storage purposes. Future applications for GeSbTe may include, "ultrafast, entirely solid-state displays with nanometre-scale pixels, semi-transparent 'smart' glasses, 'smart' contact lenses, and artificial retina devices."

=== Pyrotechnics ===
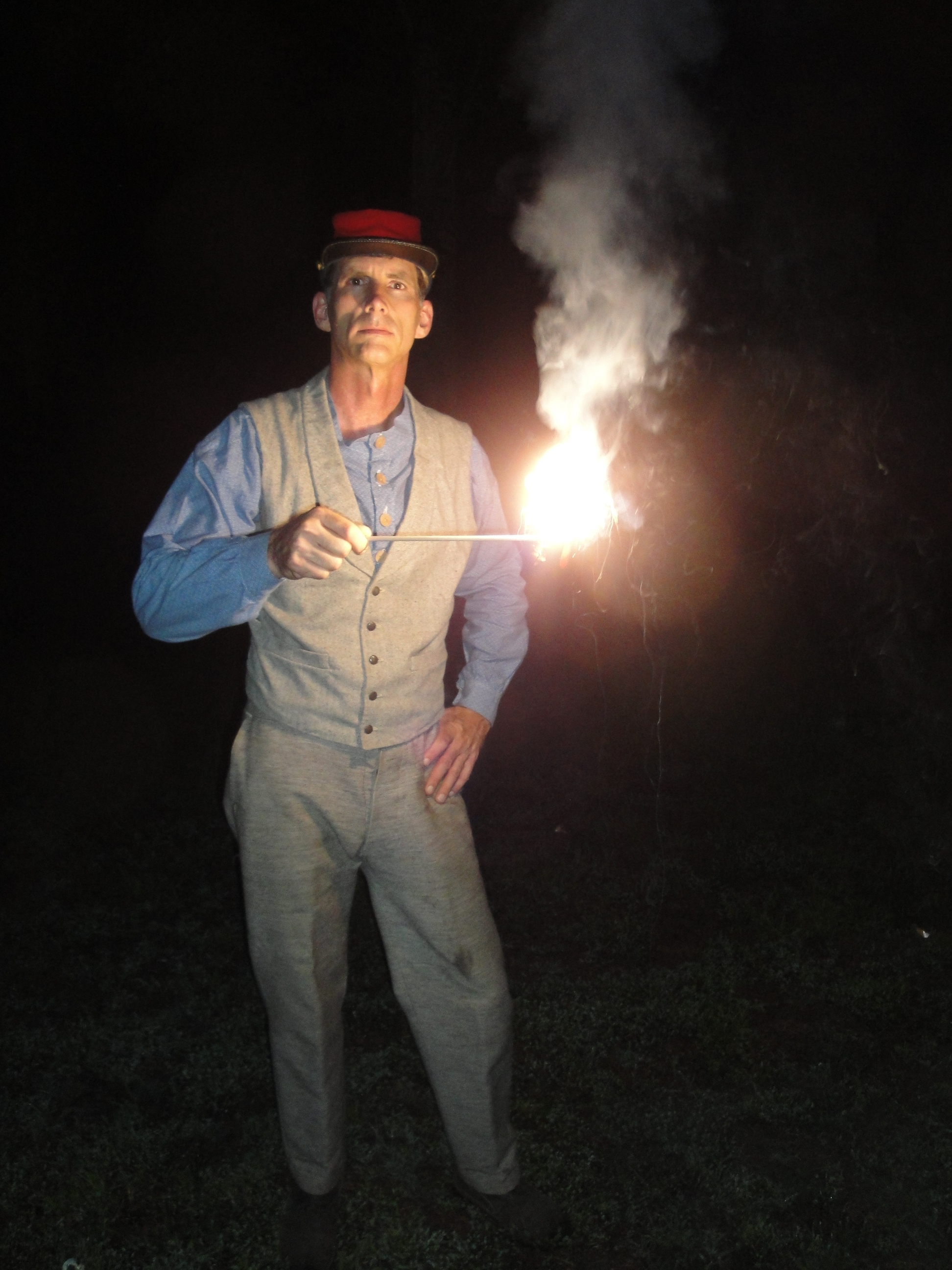
Archaic blue light signal, fuelled by a mixture of sodium nitrate, sulfur, and (red) arsenic trisulfide

The recognised metalloids have either pyrotechnic applications or associated properties. Boron and silicon are commonly encountered; they act somewhat like metal fuels. Boron is used in pyrotechnic initiator compositions (for igniting other hard-to-start compositions), and in delay compositions that burn at a constant rate. Boron carbide has been identified as a possible replacement for more toxic barium or hexachloroethane mixtures in smoke munitions, signal flares, and fireworks. Silicon, like boron, is a component of initiator and delay mixtures. Doped germanium can act as a variable speed thermite fuel. (Note: The reaction involved is Ge + 2 MoO_{3} → GeO_{2} + 2 MoO_{2}. Adding arsenic or antimony (n-type electron donors) increases the rate of reaction; adding gallium or indium (p-type electron acceptors) decreases it.) Arsenic trisulfide As_{2}S_{3} was used in old naval signal lights; in fireworks to make white stars; in yellow smoke screen mixtures; and in initiator compositions. Antimony trisulfide Sb_{2}S_{3} is found in white-light fireworks and in flash and sound mixtures. Tellurium has been used in delay mixtures and in blasting cap initiator compositions.

Carbon, aluminium, phosphorus, and selenium continue the theme. Carbon, in black powder, is a constituent of fireworks rocket propellants, bursting charges, and effects mixtures, and military delay fuses and igniters. (Note: Ellern, writing in Military and Civilian Pyrotechnics (1968), comments that carbon black "has been specified for and used in a nuclear air-burst simulator.") Aluminium is a common pyrotechnic ingredient, and is widely employed for its capacity to generate light and heat, including in thermite mixtures. Phosphorus can be found in smoke and incendiary munitions, paper caps used in toy guns, and party poppers. Selenium has been used in the same way as tellurium.

=== Semiconductors and electronics ===
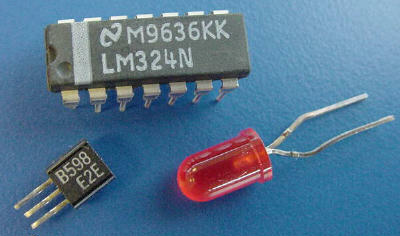
Semiconductor-based electronic components. From left to right: a transistor, an integrated circuit, and an LED. The elements commonly recognised as metalloids find widespread use in such devices, as elemental or compound semiconductor constituents (Si, Ge or GaAs, for example) or as doping agents (B, Sb, Te, for example).

All the elements commonly recognised as metalloids (or their compounds) have been used in the semiconductor or solid-state electronic industries.

Some properties of boron have limited its use as a semiconductor. It has a high melting point, single crystals are relatively hard to obtain, and introducing and retaining controlled impurities is difficult.

Silicon is the leading commercial semiconductor; it forms the basis of modern electronics (including standard solar cells) and information and communication technologies. This was despite the study of semiconductors, early in the 20th century, having been regarded as the "physics of dirt" and not deserving of close attention.

Germanium has largely been replaced by silicon in semiconducting devices, being cheaper, more resilient at higher operating temperatures, and easier to work during the microelectronic fabrication process. Germanium is still a constituent of semiconducting silicon-germanium "alloys" and these have been growing in use, particularly for wireless communication devices; such alloys exploit the higher carrier mobility of germanium. The synthesis of gram-scale quantities of semiconducting germanane was reported in 2013. This consists of one-atom thick sheets of hydrogen-terminated germanium atoms, analogous to graphane. It conducts electrons more than ten times faster than silicon and five times faster than germanium, and is thought to have potential for optoelectronic and sensing applications. The development of a germanium-wire based anode that more than doubles the capacity of lithium-ion batteries was reported in 2014. In the same year, Lee et al. reported that defect-free crystals of graphene large enough to have electronic uses could be grown on, and removed from, a germanium substrate.

Arsenic and antimony are not semiconductors in their standard states. Both form type III-V semiconductors (such as GaAs, AlSb or GaInAsSb) in which the average number of valence electrons per atom is the same as that of Group 14 elements, but they have direct band gaps. These compounds are preferred for optical applications. Antimony nanocrystals may enable lithium-ion batteries to be replaced by more powerful sodium ion batteries.

Tellurium, which is a semiconductor in its standard state, is used mainly as a component in type II/VI semiconducting-chalcogenides; these have applications in electro-optics and electronics. Cadmium telluride (CdTe) is used in solar modules for its high conversion efficiency, low manufacturing costs, and large band gap of 1.44 eV, letting it absorb a wide range of wavelengths. Bismuth telluride (Bi_{2}Te_{3}), alloyed with selenium and antimony, is a component of thermoelectric devices used for refrigeration or portable power generation.

Five metalloids – boron, silicon, germanium, arsenic, and antimony – can be found in cell phones (along with at least 39 other metals and nonmetals). Tellurium is expected to find such use. Of the less often recognised metalloids, phosphorus, gallium (in particular) and selenium have semiconductor applications. Phosphorus is used in trace amounts as a dopant for n-type semiconductors. The commercial use of gallium compounds is dominated by semiconductor applications – in integrated circuits, cell phones, laser diodes, light-emitting diodes, photodetectors, and solar cells. Selenium is used in the production of solar cells and in high-energy surge protectors.

Boron, silicon, germanium, antimony, and tellurium, as well as heavier metals and metalloids such as Sm, Hg, Tl, Pb, Bi, and Se, can be found in topological insulators. These are alloys or compounds which, at ultracold temperatures or room temperature (depending on their composition), are metallic conductors on their surfaces but insulators through their interiors. Cadmium arsenide Cd_{3}As_{2}, at about 1 K, is a Dirac-semimetal – a bulk electronic analogue of graphene – in which electrons travel effectively as massless particles. These two classes of material are thought to have potential quantum computing applications.

== Nomenclature and history ==
=== Derivation and other names ===
Several names are sometimes used synonymously although some of these have other meanings that are not necessarily interchangeable: amphoteric element, boundary element, half-way element, near metal, meta-metal, semiconductor, semimetal and submetal. "Amphoteric element" is sometimes used more broadly to include transition metals capable of forming oxyanions, such as chromium and manganese. "Meta-metal" is sometimes used instead to refer to certain metals (Be, Zn, Cd, Hg, In, Tl, β-Sn, Pb) located just to the left of the metalloids on standard periodic tables. These metals tend to have distorted crystalline structures, electrical conductivity values at the lower end of those of metals, and amphoteric (weakly basic) oxides. The names amphoteric element and semiconductor are problematic as some elements referred to as metalloids do not show marked amphoteric behaviour (bismuth, for example) or semiconductivity (polonium) in their most stable forms.

=== Origin and usage ===
The origin and usage of the term metalloid is convoluted. The name was popularized by Jöns Berzelius in the early 19th century, but he did not use it in the current meaning, but rather for a diverse group of nonmetal elements. James Apjohn's "Manual of Metalloids" published in 1864 divided all elements into either metals or metalloids. Since the mid-20th century it has been used to refer to intermediate or borderline chemical elements. The International Union of Pure and Applied Chemistry (IUPAC) previously recommended abandoning the term metalloid, and suggested using the term semimetal instead. Despite the recommendation, the term metalloid was increasingly used in the literature in 1970–2010, while semimetal remained less popular. Use of the term semimetal has more recently been discouraged by Atkins et al. as it has a more common meaning that refers to the electronic band structure of a substance rather than the overall classification of an element. The most recent IUPAC publications on nomenclature and terminology do not include any recommendations on the usage of the terms metalloid or semimetal.

== Elements commonly recognised as metalloids ==
Properties noted in this section refer to the elements in their most thermodynamically stable forms under ambient conditions.

=== Boron ===
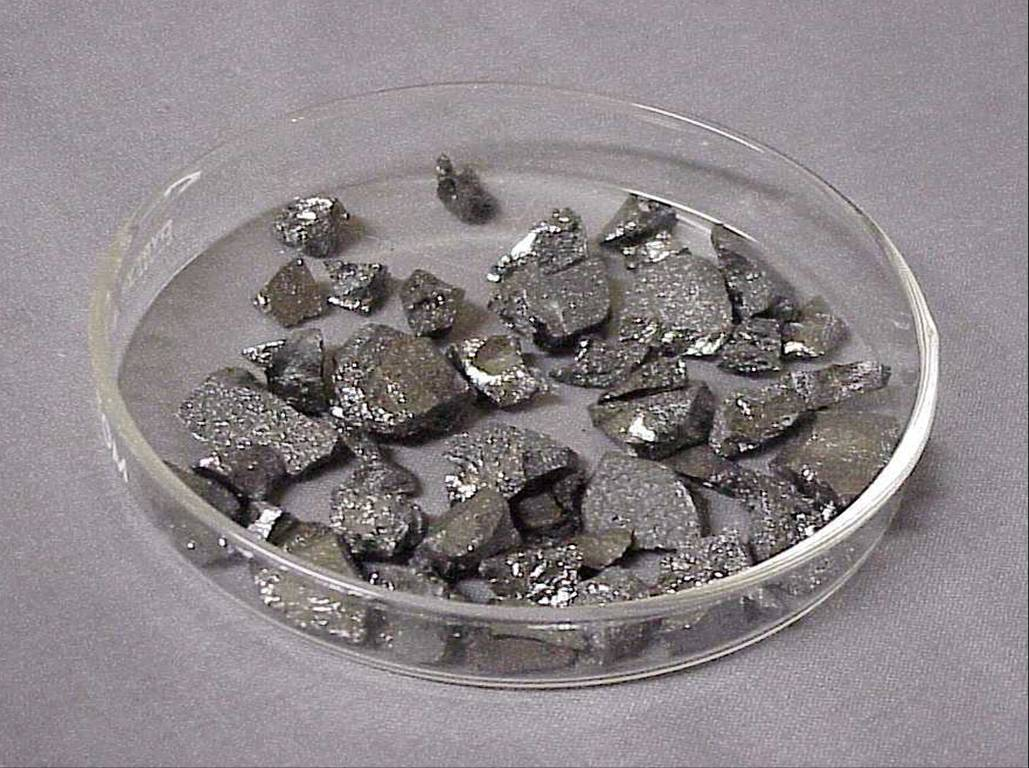
Boron, shown here in the form of its β-rhombohedral phase (its most thermodynamically stable allotrope)

Pure boron is a shiny, silver-grey crystalline solid. It is less dense than aluminium (2.34 vs. 2.70 g/cm^{3}), and is hard and brittle. It is barely reactive under normal conditions, except for attack by fluorine, and has a melting point of 2076 °C (cf. steel ~1370 °C). Boron is a semiconductor; its room temperature electrical conductivity is 1.5 × 10^{−6} S•cm^{−1} (about 200 times less than that of tap water) and it has a band gap of about 1.56 eV. (Note: Boron, at 1.56 eV, has the largest band gap amongst the commonly recognised (semiconducting) metalloids. Of nearby elements in periodic table terms, selenium has the next highest band gap (close to 1.8 eV) followed by white phosphorus (around 2.1 eV).) Mendeleev commented that, "Boron appears in a free state in several forms which are intermediate between the metals and the nonmmetals."

The structural chemistry of boron is dominated by its small atomic size, and relatively high ionization energy. With only three valence electrons per boron atom, simple covalent bonding cannot fulfil the octet rule. Metallic bonding is the usual result among the heavier congeners of boron but this generally requires low ionization energies. Instead, because of its small size and high ionization energies, the basic structural unit of boron (and nearly all of its allotropes) (Note: The synthesis of B_{40} borospherene, a "distorted fullerene with a hexagonal hole on the top and bottom and four heptagonal holes around the waist" was announced in 2014.) is the icosahedral B_{12} cluster. Of the 36 electrons associated with 12 boron atoms, 26 reside in 13 delocalized molecular orbitals; the other 10 electrons are used to form two- and three-centre covalent bonds between icosahedra. The same motif can be seen, as are deltahedral variants or fragments, in metal borides and hydride derivatives, and in some halides.

The bonding in boron has been described as being characteristic of behaviour intermediate between metals and nonmetallic covalent network solids (such as diamond). The energy required to transform B, C, N, Si, and P from nonmetallic to metallic states has been estimated as 30, 100, 240, 33, and 50 kJ/mol, respectively. This indicates the proximity of boron to the metal-nonmetal borderline.

Most of the chemistry of boron is nonmetallic in nature. Unlike its heavier congeners, it is not known to form a simple B^{3+} or hydrated [B(H_{2}O)_{4}]^{3+} cation. The small size of the boron atom enables the preparation of many interstitial alloy-type borides. Analogies between boron and transition metals have been noted in the formation of complexes, and adducts (for example, BH_{3} + CO →BH_{3}CO and, similarly, Fe(CO)_{4} + CO →Fe(CO)_{5}), (Note: The BH_{3} and Fe(CO_{4}) species in these reactions are short-lived reaction intermediates.) as well as in the geometric and electronic structures of cluster species such as [B_{6}H_{6}]^{2−} and [Ru_{6}(CO)_{18}]^{2−}. (Note: On the analogy between boron and metals, Greenwood commented that: "The extent to which metallic elements mimic boron (in having fewer electrons than orbitals available for bonding) has been a fruitful cohering concept in the development of metalloborane chemistry ... Indeed, metals have been referred to as "honorary boron atoms" or even as "flexiboron atoms". The converse of this relationship is clearly also valid ...") The aqueous chemistry of boron is characterised by the formation of many different polyborate anions. Given its high charge-to-size ratio, boron bonds covalently in nearly all of its compounds; the exceptions are the borides as these include, depending on their composition, covalent, ionic, and metallic bonding components. (Note: The bonding in boron trifluoride, a gas, has been referred to as predominately ionic a description which was subsequently described as misleading.) Simple binary compounds, such as boron trichloride are Lewis acids as the formation of three covalent bonds leaves a hole in the octet which can be filled by an electron-pair donated by a Lewis base. Boron has a strong affinity for oxygen and a duly extensive borate chemistry. The oxide B_{2}O_{3} is polymeric in structure, weakly acidic, (Note: Boron trioxide B_{2}O_{3} is sometimes described as being (weakly) amphoteric. It reacts with alkalies to give various borates. In its hydrated form (as H_{3}BO_{3}, boric acid) it reacts with sulfur trioxide, the anhydride of sulfuric acid, to form a bisulfate B(HSO_{3}) _{4}. In its pure (anhydrous) form it reacts with phosphoric acid to form a "phosphate" BPO_{4}. The latter compound may be regarded as a mixed oxide of B_{2}O_{3} and P_{2}O_{5}.) and a glass former. Organometallic compounds of boron (Note: Organic derivatives of metalloids are traditionally counted as organometallic compounds.) have been known since the 19th century (see organoboron chemistry).

=== Silicon ===
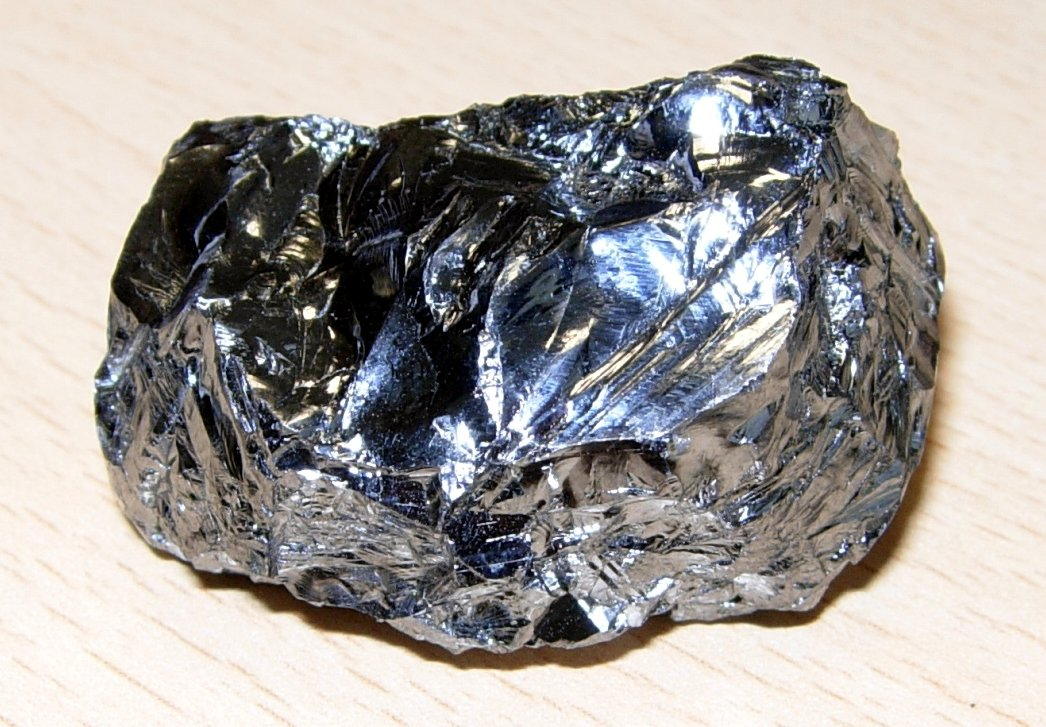
Silicon has a blue-grey metallic lustre.

Silicon is a crystalline solid with a blue-grey metallic lustre. Like boron, it is less dense (at 2.33 g/cm^{3}) than aluminium, and is hard and brittle. It is a relatively unreactive element. According to Rochow, the massive crystalline form (especially if pure) is "remarkably inert to all acids, including hydrofluoric". (Note: In air, silicon forms a thin coating of amorphous silicon dioxide, 2 to 3 nm thick. This coating is dissolved by hydrogen fluoride at a very low pace – on the order of two to three hours per nanometre. Silicon dioxide, and silicate glasses (of which silicon dioxide is a major component), are otherwise readily attacked by hydrofluoric acid.) Less pure silicon, and the powdered form, are variously susceptible to attack by strong or heated acids, as well as by steam and fluorine. Silicon dissolves in hot aqueous alkalis with the evolution of hydrogen, as do metals such as beryllium, aluminium, zinc, gallium or indium. It melts at 1414 °C. Silicon is a semiconductor with an electrical conductivity of 10^{−4} S•cm^{−1} and a band gap of about 1.11 eV. When it melts, silicon becomes a reasonable metal with an electrical conductivity of 1.0–1.3 × 10^{4} S•cm^{−1}, similar to that of liquid mercury.

The chemistry of silicon is generally nonmetallic (covalent) in nature. It is not known to form a cation. (Note: The bonding in silicon tetrafluoride, a gas, has been referred to as predominately ionic a description which was subsequently described as misleading.) Silicon can form alloys with metals such as iron and copper. It shows fewer tendencies to anionic behaviour than ordinary nonmetals. Its solution chemistry is characterised by the formation of oxyanions. The high strength of the silicon–oxygen bond dominates the chemical behaviour of silicon. Polymeric silicates, built up by tetrahedral SiO_{4} units sharing their oxygen atoms, are the most abundant and important compounds of silicon. The polymeric borates, comprising linked trigonal and tetrahedral BO_{3} or BO_{4} units, are built on similar structural principles. The oxide SiO_{2} is polymeric in structure, weakly acidic, (Note: Although SiO_{2} is classified as an acidic oxide, and hence reacts with alkalis to give silicates, it reacts with phosphoric acid to yield a silicon oxide orthophosphate Si_{5}O(PO_{4})_{6}, and with hydrofluoric acid to give hexafluorosilicic acid H_{2}SiF_{6}. The latter reaction "is sometimes quoted as evidence of basic [that is, metallic] properties".) and a glass former. Traditional organometallic chemistry includes the carbon compounds of silicon (see organosilicon).

=== Germanium ===
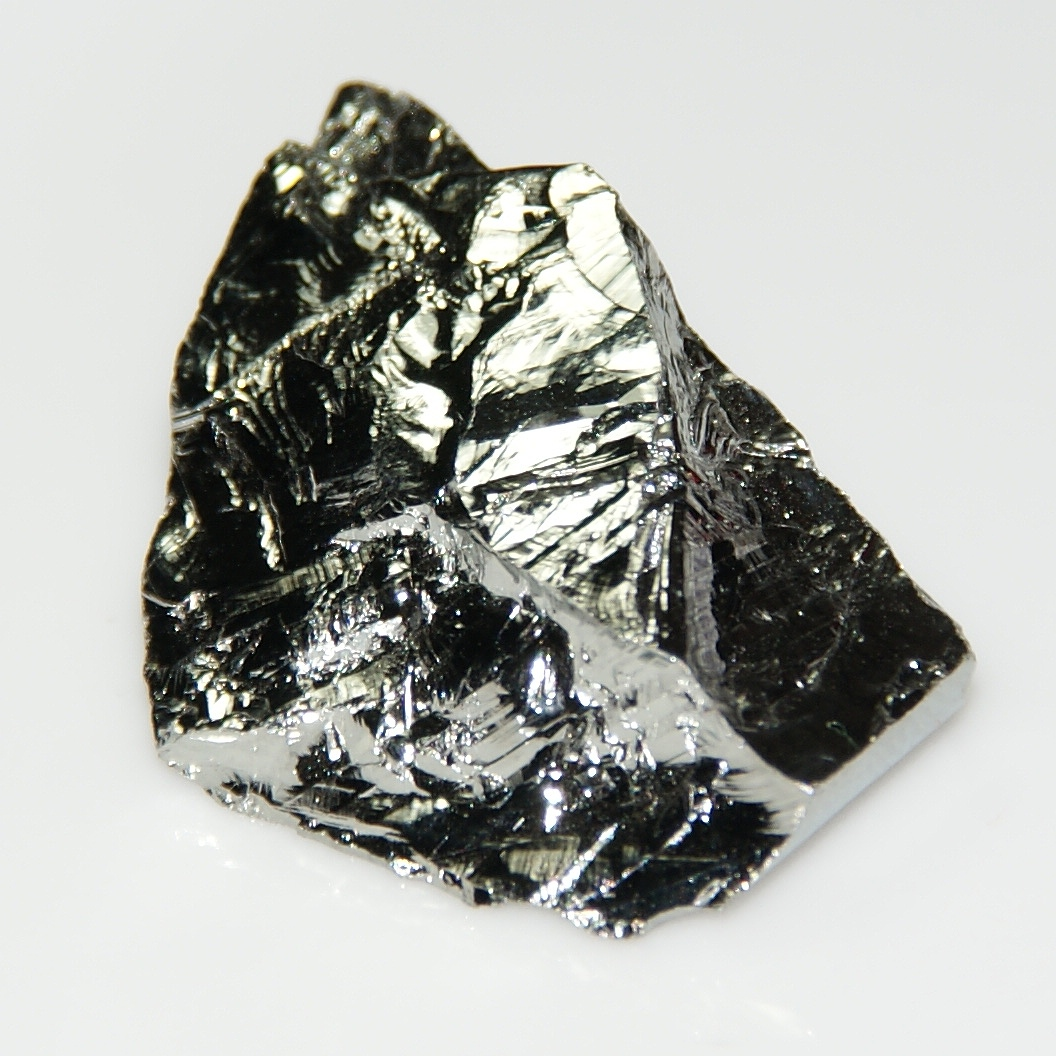
Germanium is sometimes described as a metal

Germanium is a shiny grey-white solid. It has a density of 5.323 g/cm^{3} and is hard and brittle. It is mostly unreactive at room temperature (Note: Temperatures above 400 °C are required to form a noticeable surface oxide layer.) but is slowly attacked by hot concentrated sulfuric or nitric acid. Germanium also reacts with molten caustic soda to yield sodium germanate Na_{2}GeO_{3} and hydrogen gas. It melts at 938 °C. Germanium is a semiconductor with an electrical conductivity of around 2 × 10^{−2} S•cm^{−1} and a band gap of 0.67 eV. Liquid germanium is a metallic conductor, with an electrical conductivity similar to that of liquid mercury.

Most of the chemistry of germanium is characteristic of a nonmetal. Whether or not germanium forms a cation is unclear, aside from the reported existence of the Ge^{2+} ion in a few esoteric compounds. (Note: Sources mentioning germanium cations include: Powell & Brewer who state that the cadmium iodide CdI_{2} structure of germanous iodide GeI_{2} establishes the existence of the Ge^{++} ion (the CdI_{2} structure being found, according to Ladd, in "many metallic halides, hydroxides, and chalcides"); Everest who comments that, "it seems probable that the Ge^{++} ion can also occur in other crystalline germanous salts such as the phosphite, which is similar to the salt-like stannous phosphite and germanous phosphate, which resembles not only the stannous phosphates, but the manganous phosphates also"; Pan, Fu & Huang who presume the formation of the simple Ge^{++} ion when Ge(OH)_{2} is dissolved in a perchloric acid solution, on the basis that, "ClO4^{−} has little tendency to enter complex formation with a cation"; Monconduit et al. who prepared the layer compound or phase Nb_{3}Ge_{x}Te_{6} (x ≃ 0.9), and reported that this contained a Ge^{II} cation; Richens who records that, "Ge^{2+} (aq) or possibly Ge(OH)^{+}(aq) is said to exist in dilute air-free aqueous suspensions of the yellow hydrous monoxide ... however both are unstable with respect to the ready formation of GeO_{2}.nH_{2}O"; Rupar et al. who synthesized a cryptand compound containing a Ge^{2+} cation; and Schwietzer and Pesterfield who write that, "the monoxide GeO dissolves in dilute acids to give Ge^{+2} and in dilute bases to produce GeO_{2}^{−2}, all three entities being unstable in water". Sources dismissing germanium cations or further qualifying their presumed existence include: Jolly and Latimer who assert that, "the germanous ion cannot be studied directly because no germanium (II) species exists in any appreciable concentration in noncomplexing aqueous solutions"; Lidin who says that, "[germanium] forms no aquacations"; Ladd who notes that the CdI_{2} structure is "intermediate in type between ionic and molecular compounds"; and Wiberg who states that, "no germanium cations are known".) It can form alloys with metals such as aluminium and gold. It shows fewer tendencies to anionic behaviour than ordinary nonmetals. Its solution chemistry is characterised by the formation of oxyanions. Germanium generally forms tetravalent (IV) compounds, and it can also form less stable divalent (II) compounds, in which it behaves more like a metal. Germanium analogues of all of the major types of silicates have been prepared. The metallic character of germanium is also suggested by the formation of various oxoacid salts. A phosphate [(HPO_{4})_{2}Ge·H_{2}O] and highly stable trifluoroacetate Ge(OCOCF_{3})_{4} have been described, as have Ge_{2}(SO_{4})_{2}, Ge(ClO_{4})_{4} and GeH_{2}(C_{2}O_{4})_{3}. The oxide GeO_{2} is polymeric, amphoteric, and a glass former. The dioxide is soluble in acidic solutions (the monoxide GeO, is even more so), and this is sometimes used to classify germanium as a metal. Up to the 1930s germanium was considered to be a poorly conducting metal; it has occasionally been classified as a metal by later writers. As with all the elements commonly recognised as metalloids, germanium has an established organometallic chemistry (see Organogermanium chemistry).

=== Arsenic ===
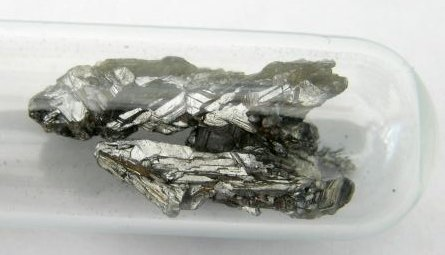
Arsenic, sealed in a container to prevent tarnishing

Arsenic is a grey, metallic looking solid. It has a density of 5.727 g/cm^{3} and is brittle, and moderately hard (more than aluminium; less than iron). It is stable in dry air but develops a golden bronze patina in moist air, which blackens on further exposure. Arsenic is attacked by nitric acid and concentrated sulfuric acid. It reacts with fused caustic soda to give the arsenate Na_{3}AsO_{3} and hydrogen gas. Arsenic sublimes at 615 °C. The vapour is lemon-yellow and smells like garlic. Arsenic only melts under a pressure of 38.6 atm, at 817 °C. It is a semimetal with an electrical conductivity of around 3.9 × 10^{4} S•cm^{−1} and a band overlap of 0.5 eV. (Note: Arsenic also exists as a naturally occurring (but rare) allotrope (arsenolamprite), a crystalline semiconductor with a band gap of around 0.3 eV or 0.4 eV. It can also be prepared in a semiconducting amorphous form, with a band gap of around 1.2–1.4 eV.) Liquid arsenic is a semiconductor with a band gap of 0.15 eV.

The chemistry of arsenic is predominately nonmetallic. Whether or not arsenic forms a cation is unclear. (Note: Sources mentioning cationic arsenic include: Gillespie & Robinson who find that, "in very dilute solutions in 100% sulphuric acid, arsenic (III) oxide forms arsonyl (III) hydrogen sulphate, AsO.HO_{4}, which is partly ionized to give the AsO^{+} cation. Both these species probably exist mainly in solvated forms, e.g., As(OH)(SO_{4}H)_{2}, and As(OH)(SO_{4}H)^{+} respectively"; Paul et al. who reported spectroscopic evidence for the presence of As_{4}^{2+} and As_{2}^{2+} cations when arsenic was oxidized with peroxydisulfuryl difluoride S_{2}O_{6}F_{2} in highly acidic media (Gillespie and Passmore noted the spectra of these species were very similar to S_{4}^{2+} and S_{8}^{2+} and concluded that, "at present" there was no reliable evidence for any homopolycations of arsenic); Van Muylder and Pourbaix, who write that, "As_{2}O_{3} is an amphoteric oxide which dissolves in water and in solutions of pH between 1 and 8 with the formation of undissociated arsenious acid HAsO_{2}; the solubility…increases at pH's below 1 with the formation of 'arsenyl' ions AsO^{+} ..."; Kolthoff and Elving who write that, "the As^{3+} cation exists to some extent only in strongly acid solutions; under less acid conditions the tendency is toward hydrolysis, so that the anionic form predominates"; Moody who observes that, "arsenic trioxide, As_{4}O_{6}, and arsenious acid, H_{3}AsO_{3}, are apparently amphoteric but no cations, As^{3+}, As(OH)^{2+} or As(OH)_{2}^{+} are known"; and Cotton et al. who write that (in aqueous solution) the simple arsenic cation As^{3+} "may occur to some slight extent [along with the AsO^{+} cation]" and that, "Raman spectra show that in acid solutions of As_{4}O_{6} the only detectable species is the pyramidal As(OH)_{3}".) Its many metal alloys are mostly brittle. It shows fewer tendencies to anionic behaviour than ordinary nonmetals. Its solution chemistry is characterised by the formation of oxyanions. Arsenic generally forms compounds in which it has an oxidation state of +3 or +5. The halides, and the oxides and their derivatives are illustrative examples. In the trivalent state, arsenic shows some incipient metallic properties. The halides are hydrolysed by water but these reactions, particularly those of the chloride, are reversible with the addition of a hydrohalic acid. The oxide is acidic but, as noted below, (weakly) amphoteric. The higher, less stable, pentavalent state has strongly acidic (nonmetallic) properties. Compared to phosphorus, the stronger metallic character of arsenic is indicated by the formation of oxoacid salts such as AsPO_{4}, As_{2}(SO_{4})_{3} (Note: The formulae of AsPO_{4} and As_{2}(SO_{4})_{3} suggest straightforward ionic formulations, with As^{3+}, but this is not the case. AsPO_{4}, "which is virtually a covalent oxide", has been referred to as a double oxide, of the form As_{2}O_{3}·P_{2}O_{5}. It consists of AsO_{3} pyramids and PO_{4} tetrahedra, joined together by all their corner atoms to form a continuous polymeric network. As_{2}(SO_{4})_{3} has a structure in which each SO_{4} tetrahedron is bridged by two AsO_{3} trigonal pyramida.) and arsenic acetate As(CH_{3}COO)_{3}. The oxide As_{2}O_{3} is polymeric, amphoteric, (Note: As_{2}O_{3} is usually regarded as being amphoteric but a few sources say it is (weakly) acidic. They describe its "basic" properties (its reaction with concentrated hydrochloric acid to form arsenic trichloride) as being alcoholic, in analogy with the formation of covalent alkyl chlorides by covalent alcohols (e.g., R-OH + HCl → RCl + H_{2}O)) and a glass former. Arsenic has an extensive organometallic chemistry (see Organoarsenic chemistry).

=== Antimony ===
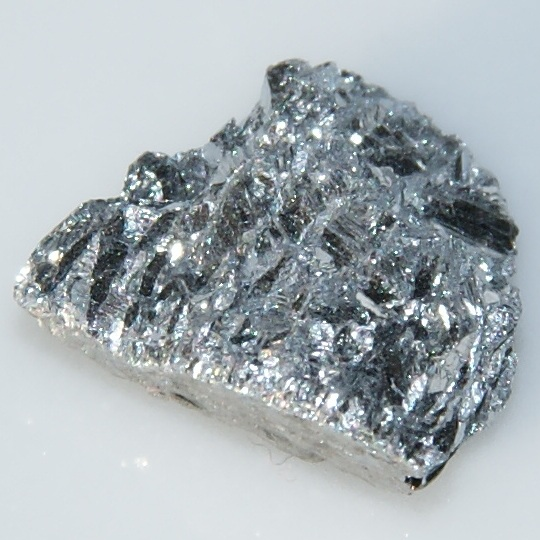
Antimony, showing its brilliant lustre

Antimony is a silver-white solid with a blue tint and a brilliant lustre. It has a density of 6.697 g/cm^{3} and is brittle, and moderately hard (more so than arsenic; less so than iron; about the same as copper). It is stable in air and moisture at room temperature. It is attacked by concentrated nitric acid, yielding the hydrated pentoxide Sb_{2}O_{5}. Aqua regia gives the pentachloride SbCl_{5} and hot concentrated sulfuric acid results in the sulfate Sb_{2}(SO_{4})_{3}. It is not affected by molten alkali. Antimony is capable of displacing hydrogen from water, when heated: 2 Sb + 3 H_{2}O → Sb_{2}O_{3} + 3 H_{2}. It melts at 631 °C. Antimony is a semimetal with an electrical conductivity of around 3.1 × 10^{4} S•cm^{−1} and a band overlap of 0.16 eV. (Note: Antimony can also be prepared in an amorphous semiconducting black form, with an estimated (temperature-dependent) band gap of 0.06–0.18 eV.) Liquid antimony is a metallic conductor with an electrical conductivity of around 5.3 × 10^{4} S•cm^{−1}.

Most of the chemistry of antimony is characteristic of a nonmetal. Antimony has some definite cationic chemistry, SbO^{+} and Sb(OH)_{2}^{+} being present in acidic aqueous solution; (Note: Lidin asserts that SbO^{+} does not exist and that the stable form of Sb(III) in aqueous solution is an incomplete hydrocomplex [Sb(H_{2}O)_{4}(OH)_{2}]^{+}.) the compound Sb_{8}(GaCl_{4})_{2}, which contains the homopolycation, Sb_{8}^{2+}, was prepared in 2004. It can form alloys with one or more metals such as aluminium, iron, nickel, copper, zinc, tin, lead, and bismuth. Antimony has fewer tendencies to anionic behaviour than ordinary nonmetals. Its solution chemistry is characterised by the formation of oxyanions. Like arsenic, antimony generally forms compounds in which it has an oxidation state of +3 or +5. The halides, and the oxides and their derivatives are illustrative examples. The +5 state is less stable than the +3, but relatively easier to attain than with arsenic. This is explained by the poor shielding afforded the arsenic nucleus by its 3d^{10} electrons. In comparison, the tendency of antimony (being a heavier atom) to oxidize more easily partially offsets the effect of its 4d^{10} shell. Tripositive antimony is amphoteric; pentapositive antimony is (predominately) acidic. Consistent with an increase in metallic character down group 15, antimony forms salts including an acetate Sb(CH_{3}CO_{2})_{3}, phosphate SbPO_{4}, sulfate Sb_{2}(SO_{4})_{3} and perchlorate Sb(ClO_{4})_{3}. The otherwise acidic pentoxide Sb_{2}O_{5} shows some basic (metallic) behaviour in that it can be dissolved in very acidic solutions, with the formation of the oxycation SbO^{+}_{2}. The oxide Sb_{2}O_{3} is polymeric, amphoteric, and a glass former. Antimony has an extensive organometallic chemistry (see Organoantimony chemistry).

=== Tellurium ===
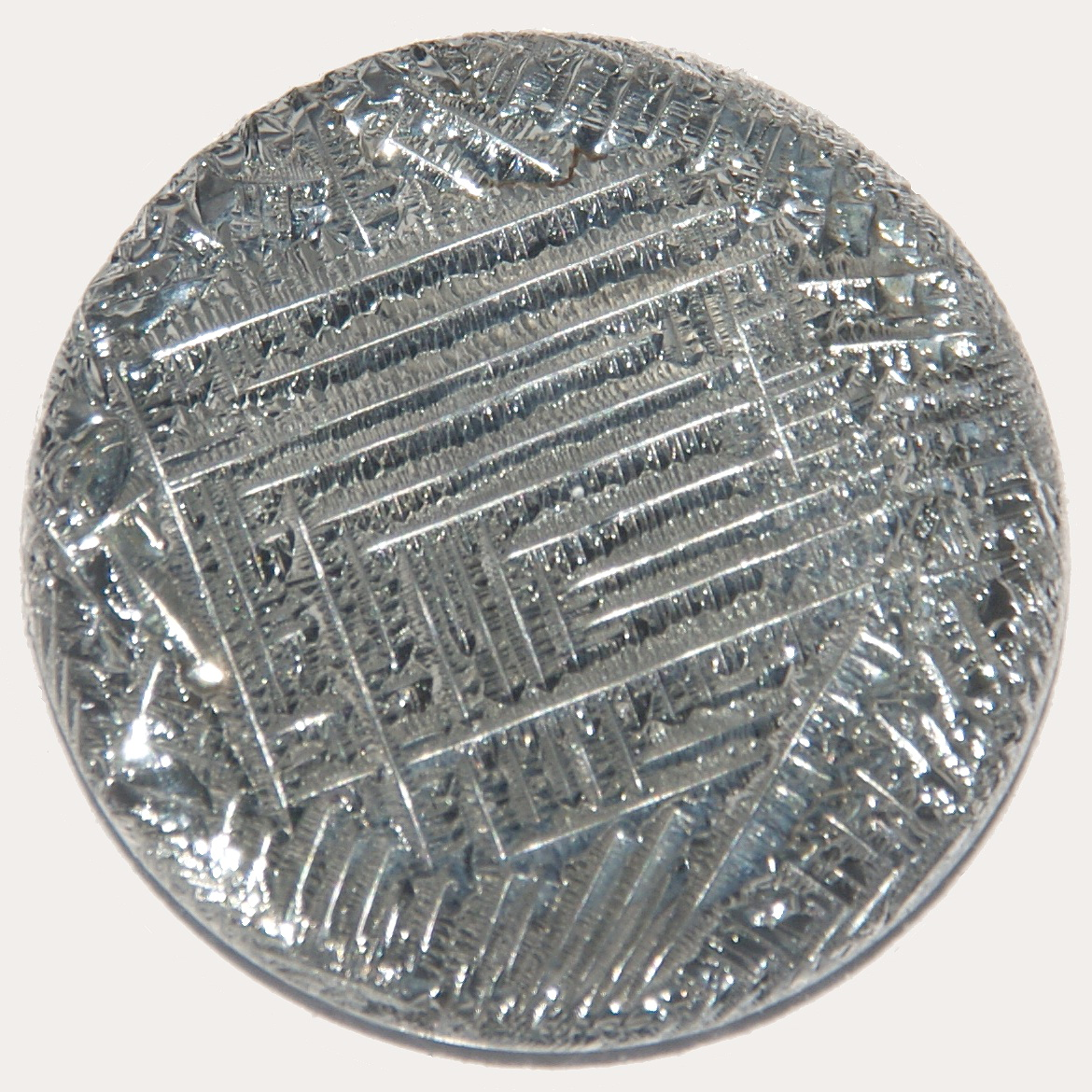
Tellurium, described by Dmitri Mendeleev as forming a transition between metals and nonmetals

Tellurium is a silvery-white shiny solid. It has a density of 6.24 g/cm^{3}, is brittle, and is the softest of the commonly recognised metalloids, being marginally harder than sulfur. Large pieces of tellurium are stable in air. The finely powdered form is oxidized by air in the presence of moisture. Tellurium reacts with boiling water, or when freshly precipitated even at 50 °C, to give the dioxide and hydrogen: Te + 2 H_{2}O → TeO_{2} + 2 H_{2}. It reacts (to varying degrees) with nitric, sulfuric, and hydrochloric acids to give compounds such as the sulfoxide TeSO_{3} or tellurous acid H_{2}TeO_{3}, the basic nitrate (Te_{2}O_{4}H)^{+}(NO_{3})^{−}, or the oxide sulfate Te_{2}O_{3}(SO_{4}). It dissolves in boiling alkalis, to give the tellurite and telluride: 3 Te + 6 KOH = K_{2}TeO_{3} + 2 K_{2}Te + 3 H_{2}O, a reaction that proceeds or is reversible with increasing or decreasing temperature.

At higher temperatures tellurium is sufficiently plastic to extrude. It melts at 449.51 °C. Crystalline tellurium has a structure consisting of parallel infinite spiral chains. The bonding between adjacent atoms in a chain is covalent, but there is evidence of a weak metallic interaction between the neighbouring atoms of different chains. Tellurium is a semiconductor with an electrical conductivity of around 1.0 S•cm^{−1} and a band gap of 0.32 to 0.38 eV. Liquid tellurium is a semiconductor, with an electrical conductivity, on melting, of around 1.9 × 10^{3} S•cm^{−1}. Superheated liquid tellurium is a metallic conductor.

Most of the chemistry of tellurium is characteristic of a nonmetal. It shows some cationic behaviour. The dioxide dissolves in acid to yield the trihydroxotellurium(IV) Te(OH)_{3}^{+} ion; (Note: Cotton et al. note that TeO_{2} appears to have an ionic lattice; Wells suggests that the Te–O bonds have "considerable covalent character".) the red Te_{4}^{2+} and yellow-orange Te_{6}^{2+} ions form when tellurium is oxidized in fluorosulfuric acid (HSO_{3}F), or liquid sulfur dioxide (SO_{2}), respectively. It can form alloys with aluminium, silver, and tin. Tellurium shows fewer tendencies to anionic behaviour than ordinary nonmetals. Its solution chemistry is characterised by the formation of oxyanions. Tellurium generally forms compounds in which it has an oxidation state of −2, +4 or +6. The +4 state is the most stable. Tellurides of composition X_{x}Te_{y} are easily formed with most other elements and represent the most common tellurium minerals. Nonstoichiometry is pervasive, especially with transition metals. Many tellurides can be regarded as metallic alloys. The increase in metallic character evident in tellurium, as compared to the lighter chalcogens, is further reflected in the reported formation of various other oxyacid salts, such as a basic selenate 2TeO_{2}·SeO_{3} and an analogous perchlorate and periodate 2TeO_{2}·HXO_{4}. Tellurium forms a polymeric, amphoteric, glass-forming oxide TeO_{2}. It is a "conditional" glass-forming oxide – it forms a glass with a very small amount of additive. Tellurium has an extensive organometallic chemistry (see Organotellurium chemistry).

== Elements less commonly recognised as metalloids ==
=== Carbon ===
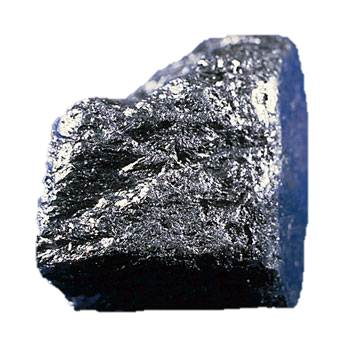
Carbon (as graphite). Delocalized valence electrons within the layers of graphite give it a metallic appearance.

Carbon is ordinarily classified as a nonmetal but has some metallic properties and is occasionally classified as a metalloid. Hexagonal graphitic carbon (graphite) is the most thermodynamically stable allotrope of carbon under ambient conditions. It has a lustrous appearance and is a fairly good electrical conductor. Graphite has a layered structure. Each layer consists of carbon atoms bonded to three other carbon atoms in a hexagonal lattice arrangement. The layers are stacked together and held loosely by van der Waals forces and delocalized valence electrons.

The electrical conductivity of graphite is high parallel to its planes (30 kS/cm at 25 °C), and decreases with increasing temperature, indicating semimetallic behaviour along that direction. Perpendicular to the planes, graphite behaves as a semiconductor: the conductivity is low (5 S/cm) but increases as the temperature rises. (Note: Liquid carbon may or may not be a metallic conductor, depending on pressure and temperature; see also.) The allotropes of carbon, including graphite, can accept foreign atoms or compounds into their structures via substitution, intercalation, or doping. The resulting materials are sometimes referred to as "carbon alloys". Carbon can form ionic salts, including a hydrogen sulfate, perchlorate, and nitrate (C^{+}_{24}X^{−}.2HX, where X = HSO_{4}, ClO_{4}; and C^{+}_{24}NO^{–}_{3}.3HNO_{3}). (Note: For the sulfate, the method of preparation is (careful) direct oxidation of graphite in concentrated sulfuric acid by an oxidising agent, such as nitric acid, chromium trioxide or ammonium persulfate; in this instance the concentrated sulfuric acid is acting as an inorganic nonaqueous solvent.) In organic chemistry, carbon can form complex cations – termed carbocations – in which the positive charge is on the carbon atom; examples are CH^{+}_{3} and CH^{+}_{5}, and their derivatives.

Graphite is an established solid lubricant and behaves as a semiconductor in a direction perpendicular to its planes. Most of its chemistry is nonmetallic; it has a relatively high ionization energy and, compared to most metals, a relatively high electronegativity. Carbon can form anions such as C^{4−} (methanide), C^{2–}_{2} (acetylide), and C^{3–}_{4} (sesquicarbide or allylenide), in compounds with metals of main groups 1–3, and with the lanthanides and actinides. Its oxide CO_{2} forms carbonic acid H_{2}CO_{3}. (Note: Only a small fraction of dissolved CO_{2} is present in water as carbonic acid so, even though H_{2}CO_{3} is a medium-strong acid, solutions of carbonic acid are only weakly acidic.)

=== Aluminium ===
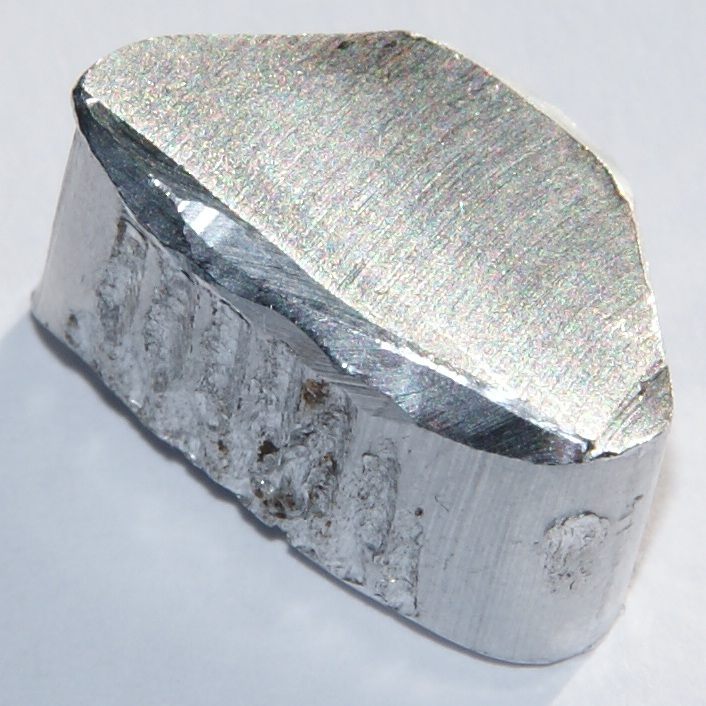
High purity aluminium is much softer than its familiar alloys. People who handle it for the first time often ask if it is the real thing.

Aluminium is ordinarily classified as a metal. It is lustrous, malleable and ductile, and has high electrical and thermal conductivity. Like most metals it has a close-packed crystalline structure, and forms a cation in aqueous solution.

It has some properties that are unusual for a metal; taken together, these are sometimes used as a basis to classify aluminium as a metalloid. Its crystalline structure shows some evidence of directional bonding. Aluminium bonds covalently in most compounds. The oxide Al_{2}O_{3} is amphoteric and a conditional glass-former. Aluminium can form anionic aluminates, such behaviour being considered nonmetallic in character.

Classifying aluminium as a metalloid has been disputed given its many metallic properties. It is therefore, arguably, an exception to the mnemonic that elements adjacent to the metal–nonmetal dividing line are metalloids. (Note: A mnemonic that captures the elements commonly recognised as metalloids goes: Up, up-down, up-down, up ... are the metalloids!)

Stott labels aluminium as a weak metal. It has the physical properties of a metal but some of the chemical properties of a nonmetal. Steele notes the paradoxical chemical behaviour of aluminium: "It resembles a weak metal in its amphoteric oxide and in the covalent character of many of its compounds ... Yet it is a highly electropositive metal ... [with] a high negative electrode potential". Moody says that, "aluminium is on the 'diagonal borderland' between metals and non-metals in the chemical sense."

=== Selenium ===
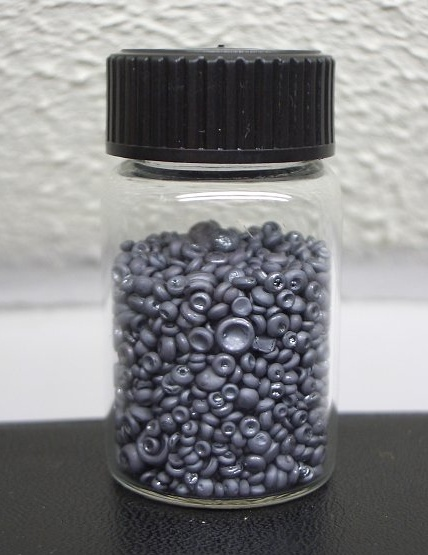
Grey selenium, being a photoconductor, conducts electricity around 1,000 times better when light falls on it, a property used since the mid-1870s in various light-sensing applications

Selenium shows borderline metalloid or nonmetal behaviour. (Note: Rochow, who later wrote his 1966 monograph The metalloids, commented that, "In some respects selenium acts like a metalloid and tellurium certainly does".)

Its most stable form, the grey trigonal allotrope, is sometimes called "metallic" selenium because its electrical conductivity is several orders of magnitude greater than that of the red monoclinic form. The metallic character of selenium is further shown by its lustre, and its crystalline structure, which is thought to include weakly "metallic" interchain bonding. Selenium can be drawn into thin threads when molten and viscous. It shows reluctance to acquire "the high positive oxidation numbers characteristic of nonmetals". It can form cyclic polycations (such as Se^{2+}_{8}) when dissolved in oleums (an attribute it shares with sulfur and tellurium), and a hydrolysed cationic salt in the form of trihydroxoselenium(IV) perchlorate [Se(OH)_{3}]^{+}·ClO^{–}_{4}.

The nonmetallic character of selenium is shown by its brittleness and the low electrical conductivity (~10^{−9} to 10^{−12} S•cm^{−1}) of its highly purified form. This is comparable to or less than that of bromine (7.95×10^{–12} S•cm^{−1}), a nonmetal. Selenium has the electronic band structure of a semiconductor and retains its semiconducting properties in liquid form. It has a relatively high electronegativity (2.55 revised Pauling scale). Its reaction chemistry is mainly that of its nonmetallic anionic forms Se^{2−}, SeO^{2−}_{3} and SeO^{2−}_{4}.

Selenium is commonly described as a metalloid in the environmental chemistry literature. It moves through the aquatic environment similarly to arsenic and antimony; its water-soluble salts, in higher concentrations, have a similar toxicological profile to that of arsenic.

=== Polonium ===
Polonium is "distinctly metallic" in some ways. Both of its allotropic forms are metallic conductors. It is soluble in acids, forming the rose-coloured Po^{2+} cation and displacing hydrogen: Po + 2 H^{+} → Po^{2+} + H_{2}. Many polonium salts are known. The oxide PoO_{2} is predominantly basic in nature. Polonium is a reluctant oxidizing agent, unlike its lightest congener oxygen: highly reducing conditions are required for the formation of the Po^{2−} anion in aqueous solution.

Whether polonium is ductile or brittle is unclear. It is predicted to be ductile based on its calculated elastic constants. It has a simple cubic crystalline structure. Such a structure has few slip systems and "leads to very low ductility and hence low fracture resistance".

Polonium shows nonmetallic character in its halides, and by the existence of polonides. The halides have properties generally characteristic of nonmetal halides (being volatile, easily hydrolyzed, and soluble in organic solvents). Many metal polonides, obtained by heating the elements together at 500–1,000 °C, and containing the Po^{2−} anion, are also known.

=== Astatine ===
As a halogen, astatine tends to be classified as a nonmetal. It has some marked metallic properties and is sometimes instead classified as either a metalloid or (less often) as a metal. (Note: A further option is to include astatine both as a nonmetal and as a metalloid.) Immediately following its production in 1940, early investigators considered it a metal. In 1949 it was called the most noble (difficult to reduce) nonmetal as well as being a relatively noble (difficult to oxidize) metal. In 1950 astatine was described as a halogen and (therefore) a reactive nonmetal. In 2013, on the basis of relativistic modelling, astatine was predicted to be a monatomic metal, with a face-centred cubic crystalline structure.

Several authors have commented on the metallic nature of some of the properties of astatine. Since iodine is a semiconductor in the direction of its planes, and since the halogens become more metallic with increasing atomic number, it has been presumed that astatine would be a metal if it could form a condensed phase. (Note: A visible piece of astatine would be immediately and completely vaporized because of the heat generated by its intense radioactivity.) Astatine may be metallic in the liquid state on the basis that elements with an enthalpy of vaporization (∆H_{vap}) greater than ~42 kJ/mol are metallic when liquid. Such elements include boron, (Note: The literature is contradictory as to whether boron exhibits metallic conductivity in liquid form. Krishnan et al. found that liquid boron behaved like a metal. Glorieux et al. characterised liquid boron as a semiconductor, on the basis of its low electrical conductivity. Millot et al. reported that the emissivity of liquid boron was not consistent with that of a liquid metal.) silicon, germanium, antimony, selenium, and tellurium. Estimated values for ∆H_{vap} of diatomic astatine are 50 kJ/mol or higher; diatomic iodine, with a ∆H_{vap} of 41.71, falls just short of the threshold figure.

"Like typical metals, it [astatine] is precipitated by hydrogen sulfide even from strongly acid solutions and is displaced in a free form from sulfate solutions; it is deposited on the cathode on electrolysis." (Note: Korenman similarly noted that "the ability to precipitate with hydrogen sulfide distinguishes astatine from other halogens and brings it closer to bismuth and other heavy metals".) Further indications of a tendency for astatine to behave like a (heavy) metal are: "... the formation of pseudohalide compounds ... complexes of astatine cations ... complex anions of trivalent astatine ... as well as complexes with a variety of organic solvents". It has also been argued that astatine demonstrates cationic behaviour, by way of stable At^{+} and AtO^{+} forms, in strongly acidic aqueous solutions.

Some of astatine's reported properties are nonmetallic. It has been extrapolated to have the narrow liquid range ordinarily associated with nonmetals (mp 302 °C; bp 337 °C), although experimental indications suggest a lower boiling point of about 230±3 °C. Batsanov gives a calculated band gap energy for astatine of 0.7 eV; this is consistent with nonmetals (in physics) having separated valence and conduction bands and thereby being either semiconductors or insulators. The chemistry of astatine in aqueous solution is mainly characterised by the formation of various anionic species. Most of its known compounds resemble those of iodine, which is a halogen and a nonmetal. Such compounds include astatides (XAt), astatates (XAtO_{3}), and monovalent interhalogen compounds.

Restrepo et al. reported that astatine appeared to be more polonium-like than halogen-like. They did so on the basis of detailed comparative studies of the known and interpolated properties of 72 elements.

== Related concepts ==
=== Near metalloids ===
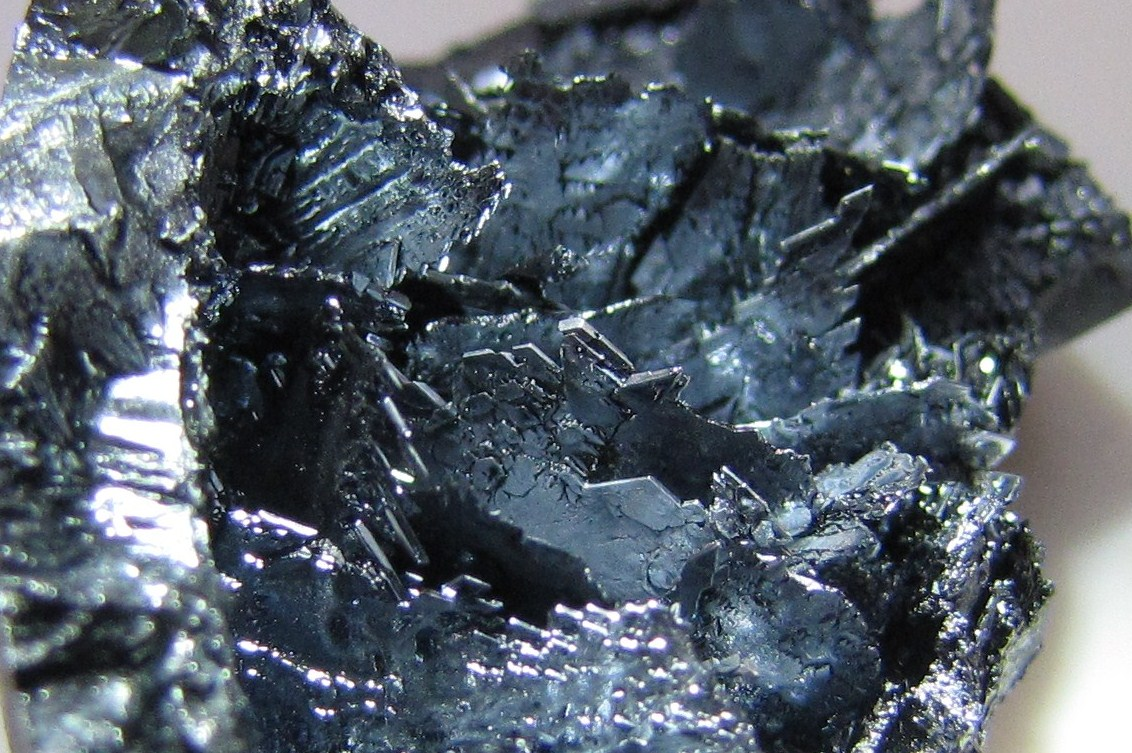
Iodine crystals, showing a metallic lustre. Iodine is a semiconductor in the direction of its planes, with a band gap of ~1.3 eV. It has an electrical conductivity of 1.7 × 10^{−8} S•cm^{−1} at room temperature. This is higher than selenium but lower than boron, the least electrically conducting of the recognised metalloids. (Note: The separation between molecules in the layers of iodine (350 pm) is much less than the separation between iodine layers (427 pm; cf. twice the van der Waals radius of 430 pm). This is thought to be caused by electronic interactions between the molecules in each layer of iodine, which in turn give rise to its semiconducting properties and shiny appearance.)

In the periodic table, some of the elements adjacent to the commonly recognised metalloids, although usually classified as either metals or nonmetals, are occasionally referred to as near-metalloids or noted for their metalloidal character. To the left of the metal–nonmetal dividing line, such elements include gallium, tin, bismuth, flerovium, moscovium, livermorium, and tennessine. They show unusual packing structures, marked covalent chemistry (molecular or polymeric), and amphoterism. To the right of the dividing line are carbon, phosphorus, selenium, iodine, and oganesson. They exhibit metallic lustre, semiconducting properties (Note: For example: intermediate electrical conductivity; a relatively narrow band gap; light sensitivity.) and bonding or valence bands with delocalized character. This applies to their most thermodynamically stable forms under ambient conditions: carbon as graphite; phosphorus as black phosphorus; (Note: White phosphorus is the least stable and most reactive form. It is also the most common, industrially important, and easily reproducible allotrope, and for these three reasons is regarded as the standard state of the element.) and selenium as grey selenium.

=== Allotropes ===
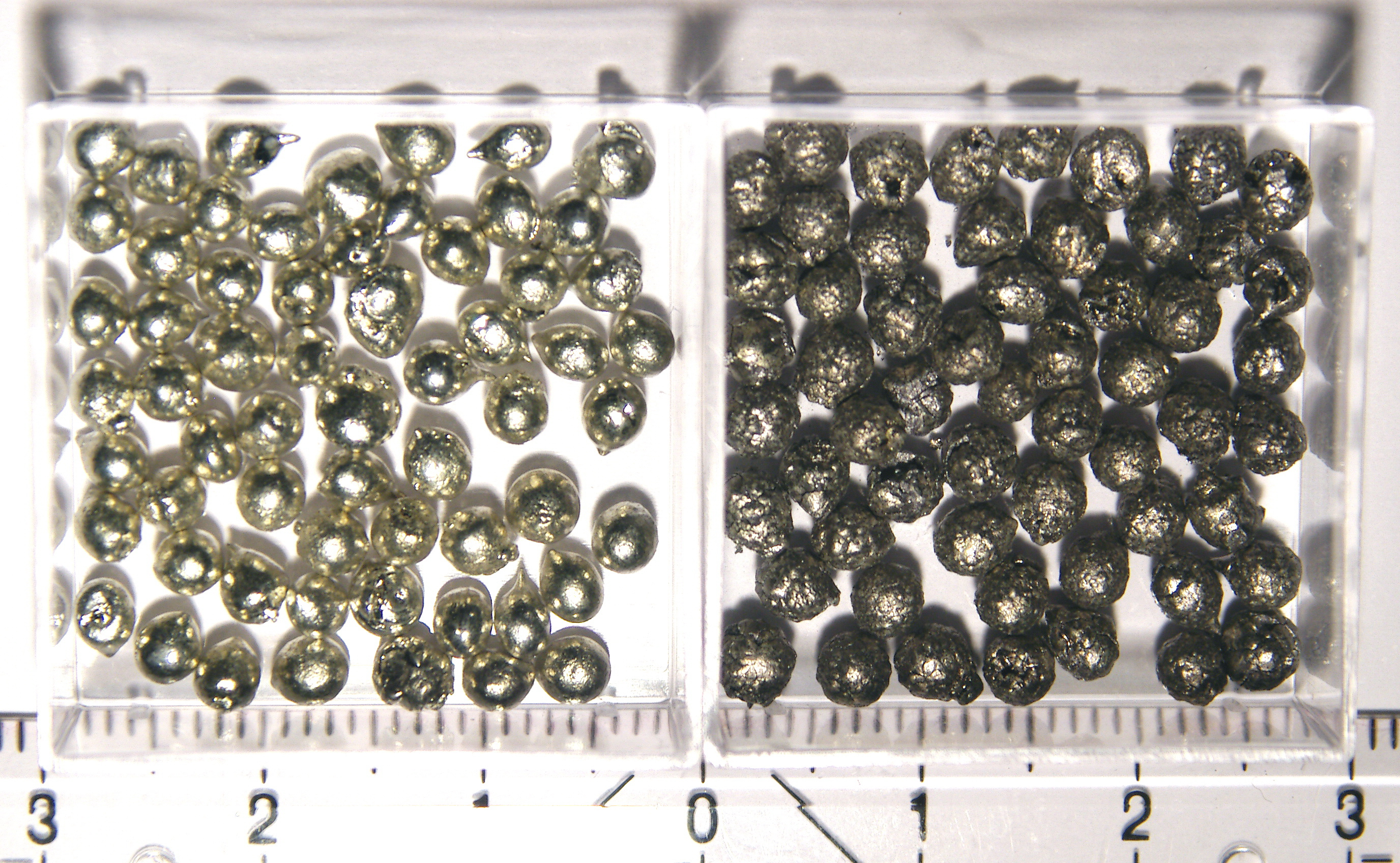
White tin (left) and grey tin (right). Both forms have a metallic appearance.

Different crystalline forms of an element are called allotropes. Some allotropes, particularly those of elements located (in periodic table terms) alongside or near the notional dividing line between metals and nonmetals, exhibit more pronounced metallic, metalloidal or nonmetallic behaviour than others. The existence of such allotropes can complicate the classification of the elements involved.

Tin, for example, has two allotropes: tetragonal "white" β-tin and cubic "grey" α-tin. White tin is a very shiny, ductile and malleable metal. It is the stable form at or above room temperature and has an electrical conductivity of 9.17 × 10^{4} S·cm^{−1} (~1/6th that of copper). Grey tin usually has the appearance of a grey micro-crystalline powder, and can also be prepared in brittle semi-lustrous crystalline or polycrystalline forms. It is the stable form below 13.2 °C and has an electrical conductivity of between (2–5) × 10^{2} S·cm^{−1} (~1/250th that of white tin). Grey tin has the same crystalline structure as that of diamond. It behaves as a semiconductor (as if it had a band gap of 0.08 eV), but has the electronic band structure of a semimetal. It has been referred to as either a very poor metal, a metalloid, a nonmetal or a near metalloid.

The diamond allotrope of carbon is clearly nonmetallic, being translucent and having a low electrical conductivity of 10^{−14} to 10^{−16} S·cm^{−1}. Graphite has an electrical conductivity of 3 × 10^{4} S·cm^{−1}, a figure more characteristic of a metal. Phosphorus, sulfur, arsenic, selenium, antimony, and bismuth also have less stable allotropes that display different behaviours.

== Abundance, extraction, and cost ==
Z	Element	Grams /tonne
8	Oxygen	461,000
14	Silicon	282,000
13	Aluminium	82,300
26	Iron	56,300
6	Carbon	200
29	Copper	60
5	Boron	10
33	Arsenic	1.8
32	Germanium	1.5
47	Silver	0.075
34	Selenium	0.05
51	Antimony	0.02
79	Gold	0.004
52	Tellurium	0.001
75	Rhenium	7×10^{−10}
54	Xenon	3×10^{−11}
84	Polonium	2×10^{−16}
85	Astatine	3×10^{−20}

=== Abundance ===
The table gives crustal abundances of the elements commonly to rarely recognised as metalloids. Some other elements are included for comparison: oxygen and xenon (the most and least abundant elements with stable isotopes); iron and the coinage metals copper, silver, and gold; and rhenium, the least abundant stable metal (aluminium is normally the most abundant metal). Various abundance estimates have been published; these often disagree to some extent.

=== Extraction ===
The recognised metalloids can be obtained by chemical reduction of either their oxides or their sulfides. Simpler or more complex extraction methods may be employed depending on the starting form and economic factors. Boron is routinely obtained by reducing the trioxide with magnesium: B_{2}O_{3} + 3 Mg → 2 B + 3MgO; after secondary processing the resulting brown powder has a purity of up to 97%. Boron of higher purity (> 99%) is prepared by heating volatile boron compounds, such as BCl_{3} or BBr_{3}, either in a hydrogen atmosphere (2 BX_{3} + 3 H_{2} → 2 B + 6 HX) or to the point of thermal decomposition. Silicon and germanium are obtained from their oxides by heating the oxide with carbon or hydrogen: SiO_{2} + C → Si + CO_{2}; GeO_{2} + 2 H_{2} → Ge + 2 H_{2}O. Arsenic is isolated from its pyrite (FeAsS) or arsenical pyrite (FeAs_{2}) by heating; alternatively, it can be obtained from its oxide by reduction with carbon: 2 As_{2}O_{3} + 3 C → 2 As + 3 CO_{2}. Antimony is derived from its sulfide by reduction with iron: Sb_{2}S_{3} → 2 Sb + 3 FeS. Tellurium is prepared from its oxide by dissolving it in aqueous NaOH, yielding tellurite, then by electrolytic reduction: TeO_{2} + 2 NaOH → Na_{2}TeO_{3} + H_{2}O; Na_{2}TeO_{3} + H_{2}O → Te + 2 NaOH + O_{2}. Another option is reduction of the oxide by roasting with carbon: TeO_{2} + C → Te + CO_{2}.

Production methods for the elements less frequently recognised as metalloids involve natural processing, electrolytic or chemical reduction, or irradiation. Carbon (as graphite) occurs naturally and is extracted by crushing the parent rock and floating the lighter graphite to the surface. Aluminium is extracted by dissolving its oxide Al_{2}O_{3} in molten cryolite Na_{3}AlF_{6} and then by high temperature electrolytic reduction. Selenium is produced by roasting the coinage metal selenides X_{2}Se (X = Cu, Ag, Au) with soda ash to give the selenite: X_{2}Se + O_{2} + Na_{2}CO_{3} → Na_{2}SeO_{3} + 2 X + CO_{2}; the selenide is neutralized by sulfuric acid H_{2}SO_{4} to give selenous acid H_{2}SeO_{3}; this is reduced by bubbling with SO_{2} to yield elemental selenium. Polonium and astatine are produced in minute quantities by irradiating bismuth.

=== Cost ===
The recognised metalloids and their closer neighbours mostly cost less than silver; only polonium and astatine are more expensive than gold, on account of their significant radioactivity. As of 5 April 2014, prices for small samples (up to 100 g) of silicon, antimony and tellurium, and graphite, aluminium and selenium, average around one third the cost of silver (US$1.5 per gram or about $45 an ounce). Boron, germanium, and arsenic samples average about three-and-a-half times the cost of silver. (Note: Sample prices of gold, in comparison, start at roughly thirty-five times that of silver. Based on sample prices for B, C, Al, Si, Ge, As, Se, Ag, Sb, Te, and Au available on-line from Alfa Aesa; Goodfellow; Metallium; and United Nuclear Scientific.) Polonium is available for about $100 per microgram. Zalutsky and Pruszynski estimate a similar cost for producing astatine. Prices for the applicable elements traded as commodities tend to range from two to three times cheaper than the sample price (Ge), to nearly three thousand times cheaper (As). (Note: Based on spot prices for Al, Si, Ge, As, Sb, Se, and Te available on-line from FastMarkets: Minor Metals; Fast Markets: Base Metals; EnergyTrend: PV Market Status, Polysilicon; and Metal-Pages: Arsenic metal prices, news, and information.)
