= List of metalloids =

This is a list of 194 sources that list elements classified as metalloids. The sources are listed in chronological order. Lists of metalloids differ since there is no rigorous widely accepted definition of metalloid (or its occasional alias, 'semi-metal'). Individual lists share common ground, with variations occurring at the margins. The elements most often regarded as metalloids are boron, silicon, germanium, arsenic, antimony and tellurium. (Note: Lack of a rigorous definition: Goldsmith RH 1982, 'Metalloids', Journal of Chemical Education, vol. 59, no. 6, pp. 526–527, doi:10.1021/ed059p526; Hawkes SJ 2001, 'Semimetallicity', Journal of Chemical Education, vol. 78, no. 12, pp. 1686–87, doi:10.1021/ed078p1686) Other sources may subtract from this list, add a varying number of other elements, or both.

== Overview ==
Elements recognized as metalloids
	13	14	15	16	17
2	B Boron	C Carbon	N Nitrogen	O Oxygen	F Fluorine
3	Al; Aluminium	Si; Silicon	P Phosphorus	S Sulfur	Cl; Chlorine
4	Ga; Gallium	Ge; Germanium	As; Arsenic	Se; Selenium	Br; Bromine
5	In; Indium	Sn; Tin	Sb; Antimony	Te; Tellurium	I Iodine
6	Tl; Thallium	Pb; Lead	Bi; Bismuth	Po; Polonium	At; Astatine
Commonly recognized (86–99%): B, Si, Ge, As, Sb, Te Irregularly recognized (40–49%): Po, At Less commonly recognized (24%): Se Rarely recognized (8–10%): C, Al (All other elements cited in less than 6% of sources) Arbitrary metal-nonmetal dividing line: between Be and B, Al and Si, Ge and As, Sb and Te, Po and At
Recognition status, as metalloids, of some elements in the p-block of the periodic table. Percentages are median appearance frequencies in the lists of metalloids. (Note: For a related commentary see also: Vernon RE 2013, 'Which Elements Are Metalloids?', Journal of Chemical Education, vol. 90, no. 12, pp. 1703–1707, doi:10.1021/ed3008457) The staircase-shaped line is a typical example of the arbitrary metal–nonmetal dividing line found on some periodic tables.

Element		Citations	Frequency
		in n = 194 publications	194 = 100%
Arsenic	As	191.5	98.7%
Tellurium	Te	190.5	98.2%
Germanium	Ge	184.5	95.1%
Silicon	Si	183.5	94.6%
Antimony	Sb	169.5	87.4%
Boron	B	166	85.6%
Polonium	Po	94.5	48.7%
Astatine	At	77	39.7%
Selenium	Se	46	23.7%
Aluminium	Al	18	9.3%
Carbon	C	16.5	8.5%
Bismuth	Bi	11.5	5.9%
Phosphorus	P	10	5.2%
Beryllium	Be	7.5	3.9%
Tin	Sn	5.5	2.8%
Sulfur	S	3	1.5%
Livermorium	Lv	3	1.5%
Iodine	I	2.5	1.3%
Flerovium	Fl	1	0.5%
Gallium	Ga	1	0.5%
Hydrogen	H	1	0.5%
Lead	Pb	1	0.5%
Moscovium	Mc	1	0.5%
Tennessine	Ts	1	0.5%

== Chronological list ==
This table shows which elements are included in each of 194 different lists of metalloids. A parenthesized symbol indicates an element whose inclusion in a particular metalloid list is qualified in some way by the author(s). The 'citations' rows show how many and what percentage of the authorities consider each element to be a metalloid, with qualified citations counted as one-half.

Citations as metalloid by element
Element		Arsenic	Tellurium	Germanium	Silicon	Antimony	Boron	Polonium	Astatine	Selenium	Aluminium	Carbon	Bismuth	Phosphorus	Beryllium	Tin	Sulfur	Livermorium	Iodine	Other	Count
Element		As	Te	Ge	Si	Sb	B	Po	At	Se	Al	C	Bi	P	Be	Sn	S	Lv	I		avg
Citations (with qualification)*		191.5 (1)	190.5 (1)	184.5 (3)	183.5 (1)	169.5 (3)	166 (2)	94.5 (5)	77 (6)	46 (4)	18 (2)	16.5 (3)	11.5 (1)	10 (2)	7.5 (1)	5.5 (1)	3 (0)	3 (0)	2.5 (1)	6 (0)	7.15
(% out of 194)		99%	98%	95%	95%	87%	86%	49%	40%	24%	9.3%	8.5%	5.9%	5.2%	3.9%	2.8%	1.5%	1.5%	1.3%	3.1%	
Source	Yr																				
Simmons	1947	As	Te			Sb				Se											4
Pauling	1949	As	Te	Ge	Si	Sb	B	Po													7
Szabó & Lakatos	1954	As	Te	Ge	Si	Sb	B	Po	At		Al				Be						10
Dull, Metcalfe & Williams	1958	As	Te	Ge	Si	Sb	B	Po	At		Al										9
Frey	1958	As	Te	Ge	Si	Sb	B	Po													7
Johnstone & Miller	1960	As	Te	Ge	Si	Sb	B			Se		C		P							9
Edwards et al.	1961	As	Te	Ge	Si	Sb	B			Se									I		8
Bond	1962	As	Te	Ge	Si	Sb	B	Po													7
Swift & Schaefer	1962	As		Ge	Si	Sb	B						Bi								6
Hoffman	1963	As	Te	Ge	Si	Sb	B								Be						7
Nathans	1963	As	Te	Ge	Si	Sb	B		At												7
Bailar, Moeller & Kleinberg	1965	As	Te	Ge						Se											4
Selwood	1965	As	Te	Ge	Si	Sb	B	Po	At		Al		Bi			Sn				Ga	12
Bassett et al.	1966		Te	Ge	Si	Sb	B	Po			Al				Be						8
Hultgren	1966	As	Te	Ge	Si	Sb				Se		C									7
Metcalfe, Williams & Castka	1966	As	Te	Ge	Si	Sb	B	Po			(Al)										7.5
Rochow	1966	As	Te	Ge	Si	Sb	B	(Po)	(At)	(Se)		(C)	(Bi)	(P)							9
Mahan	1967	As	Te	Ge	Si		B														5
Paul, King & Farinholt	1967	As	Te	Ge	Si	Sb				Se											6
Siebring	1967	As	Te	Ge	Si	Sb	B	Po			Al										8
Cotton & Lynch	1968	As	Te	Ge	Si	Sb	B		At	Se		C									9
Dunstan	1968	As	Te	(Ge)		Sb		Po			Al		Bi		Be	Sn				Pb	7.5
Tyrell & Warren	1968	As	Te	(Ge)	Si	(Sb)	B	(Po)	At	(Se)	(Al)	(C)		(P)					(I)		9.5
Williams, Embree & DeBey	1968	As	Te	Ge	Si	Sb	B	Po			Al										8
Chedd	1969	As	Te	Ge	Si	Sb	B	Po	At												8
Hägg	1969	As	Te	Ge		Sb			At							Sn					6
Holum	1969	As	Te	Ge	Si	Sb	B	Po	At		Al										9
Hunter	1969	As	Te		Si	Sb				Se											5
Moody	1969	As	Te	Ge	Si	Sb	B	Po	At		Al				Be						10
Dickerson, Gray & Haight	1970	As	Te	Ge	Si	Sb	B														6
Hardwick & Knobler	1970	As	Te	Ge	Si	Sb	B														6
Williams, Embree & DeBay	1970	As	Te	Ge	Si	Sb	B	Po			Al				Be						9
Dickson	1971	As	Te	Ge	Si	Sb		Po													6
Emsley	1971	As	Te	Ge		Sb															4
Nitz & Dhonau	1971	As	Te	Ge	Si	Sb	B	Po													7
Pimentel & Spratley	1971	As	Te	Ge	Si	Sb	B	(Po)	(At)	Se		C									9
Barrow	1972	As	Te	Ge	Si		B														5
Choppin & Johnsen	1972	As	Te	Ge	Si	Sb	B			Se											7
Horvath	1973	As	Te	Ge	Si	Sb	B	Po													7
Pascoe	1973		Te	Ge	Si		B		At	Se		C		P							8
Seager & Stoker	1973	As	Te	Ge	Si	Sb	B	Po	At		Al				Be						10
Allen & Keefer	1974	As	Te	Ge	Si	Sb	B		At	Se											8
Andrews	1974	As	Te		Si		B		At												5
Day & Johnson	1974	As	Te	Ge	Si	Sb		Po	At												7
Dickson	1974	As	Te	Ge	Si	Sb		Po	At												7
Duffy	1974	As	Te	Ge		Sb				Se											5
Fuller	1974	As	Te	Ge	Si		B			Se		C									7
Nordmann	1974	As	Te	Ge	Si		B	Po	At	Se											8
O'Connor	1974	As	Te	Ge	Si	Sb	B	Po													7
Rock & Gerhold	1974	As	Te	Ge	Si	Sb	B	Po	At												8
Pauling & Pauling	1975	As	Te	Ge	Si	Sb	B	Po													7
Hearst & Ifft	1976	As	Te	Ge	Si	Sb	B			Se											7
Tyler Miller	1976	As	Te	Ge	Si	Sb	B	Po	At		Al									H	10
Waser, Trueblood & Knobler	1976	As	Te	Ge	Si	Sb	B	Po													7
Bloomfield	1977	As	Te	Ge	Si	Sb	B	Po	At		Al										9
Ucko	1977	As	Te	Ge	Si	Sb	B	Po	At		Al										9
Hill & Holman	1978	As	Te	Ge	Si		B					(C)									5.5
Coxon, Fergusson & Phillips	1980	As	Te	Ge	Si	(Sb)	B		At						(Be)						7
Warrena & Geballe	1981	As	Te		Si		B		At	Se		C		P			S				9
Walters	1982	As	Te	Ge	Si		B														5
Edwards & Sienko	1983	As	Te	Ge		Sb		Po	(At)												5.5
Holtzclaw, Robinson & Nebergall	1984	As	Te	Ge	Si	Sb	B	Po	At												8
Boikess & Edelson	1985	As	Te	Ge	Si		B														5
Peters	1986	As	Te	Ge	Si	Sb	B	Po	At												8
Hibbert & James	1987	As	Te	Ge	Si	Sb		Po					Bi								7
Jones et al.	1987	As	Te	Ge	Si	Sb	B	Po	At												8
McQuarrie & Rock	1987	As	Te	Ge	Si	Sb	B	Po	At												8
Wulfsberg	1987	As	Te	Ge	Si	Sb	B			Se											7
Thayer	1988	As	Te	Ge	Si		B							P							6
Whitten, Gailey & Davis	1988	As	Te	Ge	Si	Sb	B	Po	At		Al										9
Bailar et al.	1989	As	Te	Ge	Si	Sb	B			Se											7
Gill	1989	As	Te	Ge	Si	Sb	B														6
Malone	1989	As	Te	Ge	Si	Sb	B	Po	At												8
Petrucci	1989	As	Te	Ge	Si	Sb		Po	At												7
Puddephatt & Monaghan	1989	As	Te	Ge	Si	Sb	B														6
Scott	1989	As	Te	Ge	Si	Sb	B														6
Segal	1989	As	Te	Ge	Si	Sb	B	Po													7
Oxtoby, Nachtrieb & Freeman	1990	As	Te	Ge	Si	Sb	B	Po	At												8
Atkins & Beran	1990	As	Te	Ge	Si	Sb		Po													6
Ebbing & Wrighton	1993	As	Te	Ge	Si	Sb	B		At												7
Zumdahl	1993	As	Te	Ge	Si	Sb	B	Po	At												8
Birk	1994	As	Te	Ge	Si	Sb	B	Po													7
Smith	1994	As	Te	Ge	Si	Sb	B														6
AAE	1996	As	Te	Ge	Si	Sb	B			Se											7
Brady & Holum	1996	As	Te	Ge	Si	Sb	B	Po	At												8
Harrison & de Mora	1996	As	Te	Ge	Si		B														5
Hook & Post	1996	As	Te	Ge	Si	Sb	B	Po	At												8
Atkins & Jones	1997	As	Te	Ge	Si	Sb		Po													6
Dayah	1997	As	Te	Ge	Si	Sb	B	Po													7
Mingos	1998	As	Te	Ge	Si	Sb	B	Po													7
Joesten & Wood	1999	As	Te	Ge	Si	Sb	B														6
Kremer	1999	As	Te	Ge	Si	Sb	B														6
Thompson	1999	As	Te	Ge	Si	Sb	B														6
Umland & Bellama	1999	As	Te	Ge	Si		B		At	Se											7
Callister	2000	As	Te	Ge	Si		B			Se		C									7
Enloe	2000	As	Te		Si		B		At												5
Mann, Meek & Allen	2000	As	Te	Ge	Si	Sb	B	Po					Bi								8
Phillips, Stozak & Wistrom	2000	As	Te	Ge	Si	Sb	B	Po	At												8
Ryan	2000	As	Te	Ge	Si		B														5
Hawkes	2001	As	Te	Ge		Sb				Se			Bi								6
Lewis & Evans	2001	As	Te	Ge	Si	Sb	B	Po													7
Masterton & Hurley	2001	As	Te	Ge	Si	Sb	B														6
Barrett	2002	(As)	(Te)	(Ge)	(Si)	(Sb)	(B)			(Se)											3.5
Chang	2002	As	Te	Ge	Si	Sb	B	Po	At									Lv		Ts	10
Harding, Johnson & Janes	2002	As	Te	Ge	Si	Sb															5
Johnson	2002	As	Te	Ge	Si	Sb			At												6
Rodgers	2002	As	Te	Ge	Si	Sb	B		At												7
Szefer	2002	As	Te	Ge	Si	Sb				Se											6
Woodgate	2002	As	Te	Ge		Sb					Al										5
Wright & Welbourn	2002	As	Te	Ge	Si		B														5
e-encyclopedia	2003	As	Te	Ge	Si	Sb	B			Se											7
Gupta	2003	As	Te	Ge	Si	Sb	B														6
Hunt	2003	As	Te	Ge	Si	Sb	B														6
Myers	2003	As	Te	Ge	Si	Sb	B		At	Se											8
Williams	2003	As	Te	Ge	Si	Sb	B	Po													7
Atkins	2004	As	Te	Ge	Si	Sb	B	Po													7
Cox	2004	As	Te	Ge	Si	Sb				Se											6
Gilbert, Kirss & Davies	2004	As	Te	Ge	Si	Sb	B		At	Se											8
Reilly	2004	As	Te	Ge	Si	Sb	B	Po	At	Se											9
Ebbing & Gammon	2005	As	Te	Ge	Si	Sb	B		At												7
Fry & Page	2005	As	Te	Ge	Si	Sb	B														6
Halliday, Resnick & Walker	2005	As	Te	Ge	Si	Sb	B	Po	At												8
Holler & Selegue	2005	As	Te	Ge	Si	Sb	B	Po	(At)												7.5
Kotz, Treichel & Weaver	2005	As	Te	Ge	Si	Sb	B														6
Meyer	2005	As	Te	Ge	Si	Sb	B		At												7
Orchin	2005	As	Te	Ge	Si	Sb	B	Po	At												8
Swenson	2005	As	Te	Ge	Si	Sb	B	Po	At	Se		C	Bi								11
Baird	2006	As	Te	Ge	Si	Sb	B		At												7
Blei & Odian	2006	As	Te	Ge	Si	Sb		Po	At									Lv			8
Brown & Holme	2006	As	Te	Ge	Si	Sb	B		At												7
Dashek & Harrison	2006	As	Te	Ge	Si	Sb	B	Po	At												8
Finch et al.	2006	As	Te	Ge	Si	Sb	B			Se											7
Goldfrank & Flomenbaum	2006	As	Te	Ge	Si	Sb	B		At												7
Hatt	2006	As	Te	Ge	Si	Sb	B			Se											7
Hérold	2006	As		Ge	Si		B	Po	(At)	Se		C	Bi	P							9.5
McMonagle	2006	As	Te	Ge	Si		B											Lv		Fl; Mc	8
Rayner-Canham & Overton	2006	As	Te	Ge	Si		B														5
Silberberg	2006	As	Te	Ge	Si	Sb	B														6
Slade	2006	As	Te	Ge	Si	Sb	B	Po													7
Wertheim, Oxlade & Stockley	2006	As	Te	Ge	Si	Sb	B		At	Se											8
Whitley	2006	As	Te	Ge	Si	Sb	B	Po													7
American Chemical Society	2007	As	Te	Ge	Si	Sb	B	Po													7
Astruc	2007	As			Si		B			Se				P			S				6
Casper	2007	As	Te	Ge	Si	Sb	B	Po													7
Crystal	2007	As	Te	Ge	Si	Sb	B	Po													7
DeGraff	2007	As	Te	Ge	Si	Sb	B	Po													7
Joesten, Hogg & Castellion	2007	As	Te	Ge	Si	Sb	B														6
Lewis	2007	As	Te	Ge	Si	Sb	B	Po		Se		C		P			S				11
Petty	2007	As	Te	Ge	Si	Sb	B	Po	At	Se		C	Bi	P		Sn					13
Rösler, Harders & Bäker	2007	As	Te	Ge	Si	Sb	B									(Sn)					6.5
Saunders	2007	As	Te	Ge	Si	Sb	B	Po	At												8
Saunders	2007	As	Te	Ge	Si	Sb	B	Po	At												8
Shipman, Wilson & Tood	2007	As	Te	Ge	Si	Sb	B														6
Bauer, Birk & Sawyer	2008	As	Te	Ge	Si	Sb	B		At												7
Clugston & Flemming	2008	As	Te	Ge	Si	Sb				Se											6
Encyclopedia Columbia	2008	As	Te			Sb				Se											4
Ham	2008	As	Te	Ge	Si	Sb	B	Po													7
Kelter, Mosher & Scott	2008	As	Te	Ge	Si	Sb	B		At												7
Masterton & Hurley	2008	As	Te	Ge	Si	Sb	B														6
Merck	2008	As	Te	Ge	Si	Sb	B	Po													7
Nicolaou & Montagnon	2008	As	Te	Ge	Si	Sb	B	Po	At			C									9
Řezanka & Sigler	2008	As	Te		Si		B		At	Se											6
Tro & Neu	2008	As	Te	Ge	Si	Sb	B														6
Vallero	2008	As	Te	Ge	Si	Sb	B	Po													7
Brown et al.	2009	As	Te	Ge	Si	Sb	B														6
Burrows et al.	2009	As	Te	Ge	Si	Sb	B			Se											7
Castor-Perry	2009	As	Te	Ge	Si	Sb	B	Po	At										I		9
Cracolice & Peters	2009	As	Te	Ge	Si	Sb	B		At												7
Economou	2009	As	Te	Ge	Si	Sb	B	Po	At		Al										9
Habashi	2009	As	Te	Ge	Si	Sb	B	Po		Se			Bi								9
Hein & Arena	2009	As	Te	Ge	Si	Sb	B	Po													7
Leach	2009	As	Te	Ge	Si	Sb	B	Po													7
Manning	2009	As	Te	Ge	Si	Sb	B	Po													7
McMurray & Fay	2009	As	Te	Ge	Si	Sb	B		At												7
Reger, Goode & Ball	2009	As	Te	Ge	Si	Sb	B														6
Schnepp	2009	As	Te	Ge	Si	Sb	B	Po	At												8
Shubert & Leyba	2009	As	Te	Ge	Si	Sb	B														6
Whitten et al.	2009	As	Te	Ge	Si	Sb	B		At												7
Aldinger & Weberruss	2010	As	Te	Ge	Si	Sb	B														6
Banks et al.	2010	As	Te	Ge	Si	Sb	B														6
Fayer	2010	As	Te	Ge	Si	Sb	B	Po	At												8
Gray	2010	As	Te	Ge	Si	Sb	B	Po													7
Groysman	2010	As	Te	Ge	Si	Sb		Po													6
Halka & Nordstrom	2010	As	Te	Ge	Si	Sb	B	Po													7
Lombi E & Holm PE	2010	As	Te	Ge	Si	Sb	B	Po	At												8
NEST Association	2010	As	Te	Ge	Si	Sb	B		At												7
RCCS	2010	As	Te	Ge	Si	Sb	B	Po	At	Se		C	Bi	P		Sn					13
Senese	2010	As	Te	Ge	Si	Sb	(B)	Po	At	(Se)		C									9
Weiner	2010	As	Te	Ge	Si	Sb	B	Po													7
Barbalace	2011	As	Te	Ge	Si	Sb	B	Po													7
Encyclopædia Britannica Online	2011	As	Te	Ge	Si	Sb	B	(Po)	(At)												7
Helmenstine	2011	As	Te	Ge	Si	Sb	B	(Po)													6.5
Moore	2011	As	Te	Ge	Si	Sb	B		At												7
QA International	2011	As	Te	Ge	Si	Sb	B			Se											7
Element		Arsenic	Tellurium	Germanium	Silicon	Antimony	Boron	Polonium	Astatine	Selenium	Aluminium	Carbon	Bismuth	Phosphorus	Beryllium	Tin	Sulfur	Livermorium	Iodine	Other	

- () Parenthesized symbols indicate elements whose inclusion in a particular metalloid list is qualified in some way by the author(s). It is counted as 0.5 citation.

There is an average of 7.15 elements per metalloid list.

== Appearance frequency clusters ==
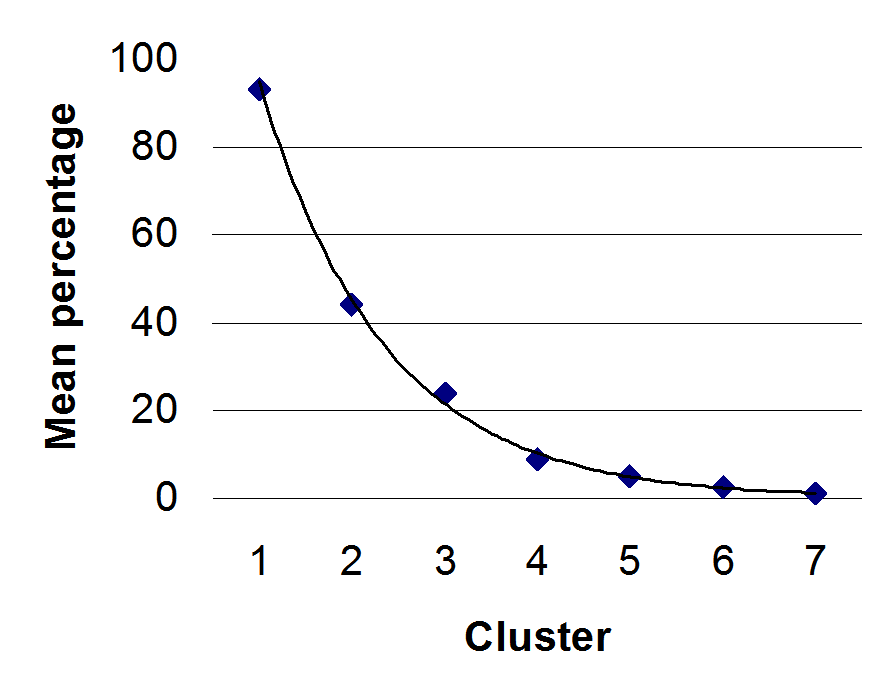
Clusters of elements and their appearance in the sources

Elements cited in the listed sources (as of August 2011; n = 194) have appearance frequencies that occur in clusters of comparable values. The diamonds in the graph mark the mean appearance frequency of each cluster.

- Cluster 1 (93%): B, Si, Ge, As, Sb, Te
- Cluster 2 (44%): Po, At
- Cluster 3 (24%): Se
- Cluster 4 (9%): C, Al
- Cluster 5 (5%): Be, P, Bi
- Cluster 6 (3%): Sn
- Cluster 7 (1%): H, Ga, S, I, Pb, Fl, Mc, Lv, Ts

The resulting geometric trend line has the formula y = 199.47e^{−0.7423x} and an R^{2} value of 0.9962. (Note: The R^{2} value is a measure of how close a formula fits a set of data points. Values fall between 0.0 and 1.0, with those near 1.0 indicating a good fit.)

== Elements regarded as metalloids ==
The elements commonly classified as metalloids are boron, silicon, germanium, arsenic, antimony and tellurium. (Note: Elements commonly classified as metalloids: Goldsmith RH 1982, 'Metalloids', Journal of Chemical Education, vol. 59, no. 6, pp. 526–7 (526), doi:10.1021/ed059p526; Mann JB, Meek TL & Allen LC 2000, 'Configuration energies of the main group elements', Journal of the American Chemical Society, vol. 122, no. 12, pp. 2780–3 (2783), doi:10.1021/ja992866e: Mann et al. refer to these elements as 'the recognized metalloids'.; Kotz JC, Treichel P & Weaver GC 2009, Chemistry and Chemical Reactivity, 7th ed., Brooks/Cole, Belmont, California, ISBN 1439041318) The status of polonium and astatine is not settled. Most authors recognise one or the other, or both, as metalloids; Herman, Hoffmann and Ashcroft, on the basis of relativistic modelling, predict astatine will be a monatomic metal. (Note: Polonium and astatine: Hawkes SJ 2001, 'Semimetallicity?', Journal of Chemical Education, vol. 78, no. 12, pp. 1686–87, doi:10.1021/ed078p1686; Holt, Rinehart & Wilson c. 2007 'Why polonium and astatine are not metalloids in HRW texts', viewed 8 February 2013; Hawkes SJ 2010, 'Polonium and astatine are not semimetals', Journal of Chemical Education, vol. 87, no. 8, p. 783, doi:10.1021/ed100308w; Hermann A, Hoffmann R & Ashcroft NW 2013, 'Condensed Astatine: Monatomic and Metallic', Physical Review Letters, vol. 111, pp. 11604–1−11604-5, doi:10.1103/PhysRevLett.111.116404; Vernon RE 2013, 'Which Elements Are Metalloids?', Journal of Chemical Education, vol. 90, no. 12, pp. 1703–1707, doi:10.1021/ed3008457) One or more of carbon, aluminium, phosphorus, selenium, tin or bismuth, these being periodic table neighbours of the elements commonly classified as metalloids, are sometimes recognised as metalloids. (Note: Carbon, aluminium, phosphorus, selenium, tin, bismuth: Rochow EG 1966, The metalloids, DC Heath and Company, Boston, pp. 7–8; Cobb HM 2012, Dictionary of Metals, ASM International, Materials Park, OH, p. 145, ISBN 9781615039784; Walker CH 2012, Organic Pollutants: An Ecotoxicological Perspective, 2nd ed., CRC Press, Boca Raton, FL, p. 163, ISBN 9781420062588; Whiten K, Davis R, Peck L & Stanley G 2014, Chemistry, 10th ed., Brooks/Cole Cengage Learning, Belmont, CA, p. 134, ISBN 9781133610663) Selenium, in particular, is commonly designated as a metalloid in environmental chemistry (Note: Selenium as a metalloid in environmental chemistry: Meyer JS, Adams WJ, Brix KV, Luoma SM, Mount DR, Stubblefield WA & Wood CM (eds) 2005, Toxicity of dietborne metals to aquatic organisms, Proceedings from the Pellston Workshop on Toxicity of Dietborne Metals to Aquatic Organisms, 27 July – 1 August 2002, Fairmont Hot Springs, British Columbia, Canada, Society of Environmental Toxicology and Chemistry, Pensacola, Florida, p. 284, ISBN 1880611708; Weiner ER 2013, Applications of Environmental Aquatic Chemistry: A Practical Guide, 3rd ed., CRC Press, Boca Raton, FL, p. 181, ISBN 9781439853320) on account of similarities in its aquatic chemistry with that of arsenic and antimony. (Note: Similarities in the aquatic chemistry of selenium, arsenic, and antimony: US Environmental Protection Agency 1988, Ambient aquatic life water quality criteria for antimony (III), draft, Office of Research and Development, Environmental Research Laboratories, Washington, p. 1; De Zuane J 1997, Handbook of drinking water quality, 2nd ed., John Wiley & Sons, New York, p. 93, ISBN 047128789X; Uden PC 2005, 'Speciation of selenium,' in R Cornelis, J Caruso, H Crews & K Heumann (eds), Handbook of elemental speciation II: Species in the environment, food, medicine and occupational health, John Wiley & Sons, Chichester, pp. 346–65 (347–8), ISBN 0470855983; Dev N 2008, 'Modelling selenium fate and transport in Great Salt Lake Wetlands' PhD dissertation, University of Utah, ProQuest, Ann Arbor, Michigan, pp. 2–3, ISBN 054986542X) There are fewer references to beryllium, in spite of its periodic table position adjoining the dividing line between metals and nonmetals. Isolated references in the literature can also be found to the categorisation of other elements as metalloids. These elements include: hydrogen, nitrogen, (Note: Nitrogen: Rausch MD 1960, 'Cyclopentadienyl compounds of metals and metalloids', Journal of Chemical Education, vol. 37, no. 11, pp. 568–78, doi:10.1021/ed037p568) sulfur, (Note: Sulfur: Chalmers B 1959, Physical metallurgy, John Wiley & Sons, New York, p. 72; US Bureau of Naval Personnel 1965, Shipfitter 3 & 2, US Government Printing Office, Washington, p. 26) zinc, (Note: Zinc: Siebring BR 1967, Chemistry, MacMillan, New York, p. 613) gallium, (Note: Gallium: Wiberg N 2001, Inorganic chemistry, Academic Press, San Diego, p. 282, ISBN 0123526515) iodine, (Note: Iodine: Friend JN 1953, Man and the chemical elements, 1st ed., Charles Scribner's Sons, New York, p. 68; Rausch MD 1960, 'Cyclopentadienyl compounds of metals and metalloids', Journal of Chemical Education, vol. 37, no. 11, pp. 568–78, doi:10.1021/ed037p568) lead, (Note: Lead: Murray JF 1928, 'Cable-sheath corrosion', Electrical World, vol. 92, Dec 29, pp. 1295–7 (1295)) and radon (Note: Radon: Hampel CA & Hawley GG 1966, The encyclopedia of chemistry, 3rd ed., Van Nostrand Reinhold, New York, p. 950; Stein L 1985, 'New evidence that radon is a metalloid element: ion-exchange reactions of cationic radon', Journal of the Chemical Society, Chemical Communications, vol. 22, pp. 1631–2, doi:10.1039/C39850001631; Stein L 1987, 'Chemical properties of radon' in PK Hopke (ed.) 1987, Radon and its decay products: Occurrence, properties, and health effects, American Chemical Society, Washington DC, pp. 240–51 (240, 247–8), ISBN 0841210152) (citations are for references other than those listed above).
