= Silica sulfuric acid =

Chemical compound

Silica sulfuric acid (SiO_{2}-OSO_{3}H_{2}, SSA), a solid acid, is prepared by soaking silica gel with sulfuric acid. SSA is used as a catalyst in different organic synthesis process. Silica sulfuric acid is considered as cheap, nonhazardous and easy to handle solid acid catalyst with high acidity.

== Synthesis ==
In a typical process, SSA is prepared by soaking silica gel into sulfuric acid of an appropriate concentration. Then moisture and water content of the mixture was evaporated by heating at high temperature (120–180 °C).

SiO_{2}–H_{2}O + H_{2}SO_{4} → SiO_{2}–H_{2}SO_{4} + H_{2}O

== Use ==
Silica sulfuric acid is mostly used as a solid acid catalyst in organic conversion.
