= Germanane =

Germanane is a single-layer crystal composed of germanium with one hydrogen bonded in the z-direction for each atom, in contrast to germanene which contains no hydrogen. In material science, great interest is shown in related single layered materials, such as graphene, composed of carbon, and silicene, composed of silicon. Such materials represent a new generation of semiconductors with potential applications in computer chips and solar cells. Germanane's structure is similar to graphane, and therefore graphene. Bulk germanium does not adopt this structure. Germanane has been produced in a two-step route starting with calcium germanide. From this material, the calcium is removed by de-intercalation with HCl to give a layered solid with the empirical formula GeH. The Ca sites in Zintl phase CaGe_{2} interchange with the H atoms in the HCl solution, which leaves GeH and CaCl_{2}.

== Properties ==
Germanane's electron mobility is predicted to be more than ten times that of silicon and five times more than conventional germanium. Hydrogen-doped germanane is chemically and physically stable when exposed to air and water.

Germanane has a "direct band gap", easily absorbing and emitting light, and potentially useful for optoelectronics. (Conventional silicon and germanium have indirect band gaps, reducing light absorption or emission.) In addition, the Ge atoms have higher spin-orbit coupling (as compared to C in graphene/graphane) which can allow us to explore the quantum spin Hall effect.

== Electrical and optical properties ==
Researchers at the University of Groningen in the Netherlands and the University of Ioannina in Greece, have reported on the first field effect transistor fabricated with germanane, highlighting its promising electronic and optoelectronic properties. Germanane FET's show transport in both electron and hole doped regimes with on/off current ratio of up to 10^{5}(10^{4}) and carrier mobilities of 150 cm^{2} (V.s)^{−1}(70 cm^{2} (V.s)^{−1}) at 77 K (room temperature). A significant enhancement of the device conductivity under illumination with 650 nm red laser is observed.
