= Dividing line between metals and nonmetals =

Feature of some periodic tables of the elements

1	2	...	12	13	14	15	16	17	18
H									He
Li	Be			B	C	N	O	F	Ne
Na	Mg			Al	Si	P	S	Cl	Ar
K	Ca		Zn	Ga	Ge	As	Se	Br	Kr
Rb	Sr		Cd	In	Sn	Sb	Te	I	Xe
Cs	Ba		Hg	Tl	Pb	Bi	Po	At	Rn
Fr	Ra		Cn	Nh	Fl	Mc	Lv	Ts	Og
Condensed periodic table showing a typical metal–nonmetal dividing line. Elements commonly recognised as metalloids (boron, silicon, germanium, arsenic, antimony and tellurium) and those inconsistently recognised as such (polonium and astatine) Metal-nonmetal dividing line (arbitrary): between Li and H, Be and B, Al and Si, Ge and As, Sb and Te, Po and At, Ts and Og

The dividing line between metals and nonmetals can be found, in varying configurations, on some representations of the periodic table of the elements (see mini-example, right). Elements to the lower left of the line generally display increasing metallic behaviour; elements to the upper right display increasing nonmetallic behaviour. When presented as a regular stair-step, elements with the highest critical temperature for their groups (Li, Be, Al, Ge, Sb, Po) lie just below the line.

The location and therefore usefulness of the line is debated. It cuts through the metalloids, elements that share properties between metals and nonmetals, in an arbitrary manner, since the transition between metallic and non-metallic properties among these elements is gradual.

== Names ==
This line has been called the amphoteric line, the metal-nonmetal line, the metalloid line, the semimetal line, or the staircase. (Note: Sacks described the dividing line as, 'A jagged line, like Hadrian's Wall ... [separating] the metals from the rest, with a few "semimetals", metalloids—arsenic, selenium—straddling the wall.') While it has also been called the Zintl border or the Zintl line these terms instead refer to a vertical line sometimes drawn between groups 13 and 14. This particular line was named by Laves in 1941. It differentiates group 13 elements from those in and to the right of group 14. The former generally combine with electropositive metals to make intermetallic compounds whereas the latter usually form salt-like compounds.

== History ==
References to a dividing line between metals and nonmetals appear in the literature as far back as at least 1869. In 1891, Walker published a periodic "tabulation" with a diagonal straight line drawn between the metals and the nonmetals. In 1906, Alexander Smith published a periodic table with a zigzag line separating the nonmetals from the rest of elements, in his highly influential textbook Introduction to General Inorganic Chemistry. In 1923, Horace G. Deming, an American chemist, published short (Mendeleev style) and medium (18-column) form periodic tables. Each one had a regular stepped line separating metals from nonmetals. Merck and Company prepared a handout form of Deming's 18-column table, in 1928, which was widely circulated in American schools. By the 1930s Deming's table was appearing in handbooks and encyclopaedias of chemistry. It was also distributed for many years by the Sargent-Welch Scientific Company.

== Double line variant ==
A dividing line between metals and nonmetals is sometimes replaced by two dividing lines. One line separates metals and metalloids; the other metalloids and nonmetals.

== Concerns ==
Mendeleev wrote that, "It is, however, impossible to draw a strict line of demarcation between metals and nonmetals, there being many intermediate substances". (Note: In the context of Mendeleev's observation, Glinka adds that: "In classing an element as a metal or a nonmetal we only indicate which of its properties—metallic or nonmetallic—are more pronounced in it".) (Note: Mendeleev regarded tellurium as such an intermediate substance: '... it is a bad conductor of heat and electricity, and in this respect, as in many others, it forms a transition from the metals to the nonmetals.') Several other sources note confusion or ambiguity as to the location of the dividing line; suggest its apparent arbitrariness provides grounds for refuting its validity; and comment as to its misleading, contentious or approximate nature. Deming himself noted that the line could not be drawn very accurately.
