= Rolf Siemssen =

German-Dutch nuclear physicist (born 1933)

- Born: Rolf Hendrik Siemssen; 15 March 1933; Fuzhou, China
- Died: 29 January 2021 (aged 87); Haren, Groningen, Netherlands
- Occupation: Nuclear physicist

Academic background
- Education: University of Hamburg
- Thesis: Untersuchungen zum Reaktionsmechanismus von 1p=1 Stripping Reaktionen an leichten Kernen (1963)
- Doctoral advisor: Willibald Jentschke

Academic work
- Institutions: Argonne National Laboratory, University of Groningen, Kernfysisch Versneller Instituut (nl)

Rolf Hendrik Siemssen (15 March 1933 – 29 January 2021) was a Dutch-German nuclear physicist. He was a professor of experimental nuclear physics at the University of Groningen between 1971 and 1998. Siemssen was director of the Kernfysisch Versneller Instituut (nl) between 1972 and 1991.

== Life ==
Siemssen was born on 15 March 1933 in Fuzhou, China. During his youth he also spent a period in Shanghai. At the age of 14 he moved to Germany. In 1953, he started studying physics, first at the University of Tübingen and later the Ludwig-Maximilians-Universität München and ultimately the University of Hamburg. He obtained a degree in 1958. From 1959 to 1963, Siemssen was a scientific assistant at Argonne National Laboratory in the United States. Siemssen obtained his PhD in 1963 under Willibald Jentschke from the University of Hamburg with a dissertation titled: "Untersuchungen zum Reaktionsmechanismus von 1p=1 Stripping Reaktionen an leichten Kernen". For which he performed research with a Van de Graaff generator. From 1963 to 1966 he was a research associate at Argonne National Laboratory. From 1966 to 1968 he was an assistant professor at the laboratory of D. Allan Bromley at Yale University. Between 1968 and 1971, he was a scientific employee at Argonne National Laboratory. His time at the Argonne National Laboratory was a great influence on Siemssen, driving his scientific research and collaboration efforts. In 1971, he became a professor of experimental nuclear physics at the University of Groningen. He retired as professor in 1998.

In 1972, Siemssen became director of the Kernfysisch Versneller Instituut (nl) (KVI), having taken over from Hendrik Brinkman. He was the first director under the new management structure in which the University of Groningen and the Stichting voor Fundamenteel Onderzoek der Materie (nl) (FOM) were co-responsible. He was tasked with making the institute a formal research institute. In 1974 Siemssen succeeded in attracting Francesco Iachello to the KVI on behalf of the FOM. During the summer of the same year Akito Arima also visited the KVI for a three-month period on Siemssen's invitation. Iachello and Arima subsequently laid the base for the interacting boson model during their time at the KVI.

During Siemssen's time as director the spectrum of research at the KVI was broadened, with atomic physics being added in the 1980s. And in 1985 in a joint Dutch-French effort the decision was made to build a new cyclotron. In 1988 Siemssen was re-appointed as director for a three-year term. In August 1990 he asked to be relieved of his position per 1 January 1991. In 1998 he retired as professor.

Siemssen was elected a fellow of the American Physical Society in 1972. He was elected a member of the Royal Netherlands Academy of Arts and Sciences in 1987. Siemssen became a foreign member of the Polish Academy of Arts and Sciences in 2006. He was an officer in the Order of Orange-Nassau.

He was a long time editor of Physics Letters B and served as co-editor of Europhysics Letters.

Siemssen was married and had several children. His wife died in 2018. He died on 29 January 2021 in Haren, Groningen, Netherlands.

== Sources ==
- van der Woude, Adriaan. 40 jaar Kernfysisch Versneller Instituut. University of Groningen, 2008. Archived on 23 September 2020
