= Hans Geissel =

German experimental nuclear physicist (1950–2024)

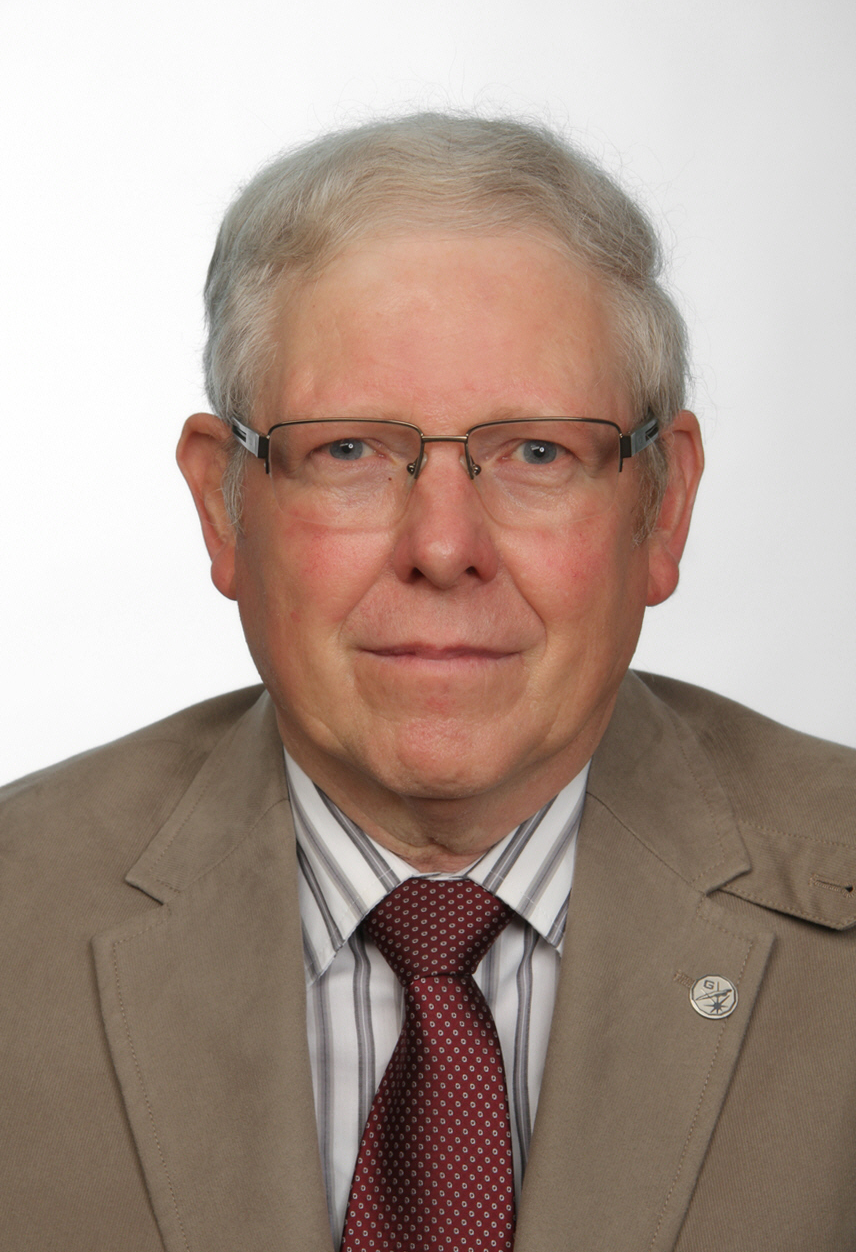
- Geissel in 2023
- Born: 13 May 1950
- Died: 29 April 2024 (aged 73)

Hans Geissel (13 May 1950 – 29 April 2024) was a German experimental physicist who studied the atomic and nuclear interaction of energetic heavy ions with matter. In particular, his research focused on the discovery of new isotopes and the investigation of their properties. Geissel was an adjunct professor at the II Institute of Physics at JLU Giessen (emeritus 2015) and was head of the FRS / Super-FRS department at the GSI Helmholtz Centre for Heavy Ion Research in Darmstadt, where he was a Helmholtz Professor.

== Education ==
Geissel studied physics at the Justus Liebig University of Giessen in Gießen. In his diploma thesis, which was supervised by Prof. Dr. Gottfried Münzenberg, he worked on the development of time-of-flight detectors as part of the construction of the heavy-ion separator SHIP in the newly-founded research center GSI in Darmstadt. His doctoral thesis (supervisor: Prof. Dr. Peter Armbruster) concentrated on the study of atomic interactions and the slowing-down of heavy ions in matter in the energy range up to 10 MeV/u, which was available at the UNILAC for all projectiles up to uranium for the first time.

From 1982 to 1984, Geissel worked as a post-doctoral student at the Canadian institute AECL in Chalk River (Ontario) in the field of solid-state physics. In the group of Prof. Dr. William Lennard, he carried out several experiments on a research reactor and smaller ion accelerators.

== Construction of the fragment separator FRS at GSI ==
Back in Germany at GSI in 1984, his major research activity was the design, calculation and construction of the projectile fragment separator FRS with G. Münzenberg and the GSI infrastructure as part of the SIS-ESR project.

== Generation and investigation of new atomic nuclei ==
Geissel worked as a researcher at GSI's FRS for over three decades, in particular on the production and investigation of new, unstable isotopes.

In 1999, GSI was awarded the 7th SUN-AMCO Medal of the IUPAP for its contributions to the production and mass determination of heavy nuclei, which Geissel and Sigurd Hofmann accepted on behalf of the research center.

From 2012, Geissel held the world record with the discovery of more than 280 new isotopes.

The first proton-halo nucleus and 2-proton radioactivity are examples of important discoveries made with the FRS and its detector systems. With the FRS branch in combination with the storage and cooler ring ESR, several hundred new ground-state masses were measured for the first time and the new β^{−}-decay mode into bound atomic states was investigated. Pioneering experiments with the FRS-ESR combination were led by Hans Geissel for more than ten years. The third FRS branch provides relativistic exotic projectile beams to the large detector systems LAND and ALADIN, where new nuclear properties have been discovered by applying full kinematic measurements of all nuclear reaction products.

Since the FRS is also a high-resolution magnetic spectrometer, it has been used to investigate new properties in the field of atomic collisions of relativistic heavy ions. These studies are directly related to the results of Geissel's doctoral thesis and the AECL experiments in the low-energy range. The experimental results at relativistic velocities clearly show strong deviations from the widely-used Bethe theory. Precise data on atomic interactions are also required for tumor therapy with ions and other applications. In the early 1990s, Geissel was also strongly involved in the development of positron-emitting beams for the irradiation of tumor patients. At that time, he also achieved the experimental discovery of deeply-bound pionic states in heavy atoms (Pb, Sn).

Geissel and his colleagues in international research teams in France, Japan, Canada and the USA have contributed to an improved understanding of both the atomic and nuclear interaction of energetic ions with matter. In the near future, experiments with the FRS will be extended to higher rates and accuracies with the Super-FRS currently under construction.

== Work in education ==
From 1985, Geissel supervised many generations of diploma, master and doctoral students, most of which were carried out at the Justus-Liebig University in Giessen. He habilitated in 1994 in the physics department at his alma mater in the 2nd Physics Institute, which was headed by Prof. Dr. Volker Metag at the time. Since then he had been a member of the IONAS group (Ion Optics, Nuclear Astrophysics and Structure), which was founded in 2000 and studies the structure and properties of exotic nuclei at the GSI.

== Death ==
Geissel died on 29 April 2024, at the age of 73.

== Awards ==
- 2000 and 2010 GENCO Membership Award
- 2010: Honorary Doctorate at Chalmers University of Technology, Gothenburg
- 2010: Golden Medal of the Comenius University Bratislava
- 2011: GSI Distinguished Scientist
- 2013: "Weltrekord“ in der Zahl der neuentdeckten Isotope
- 2015 Specially Appointed Professor at the Osaka University
- 2015: Helmholtz Professor an der GSI
- 2020: Alexander von Humboldt-Award für Physik der Foundation for Polish Science, Polen
