= Sigurd Hofmann =

German physicist (1944–2022)

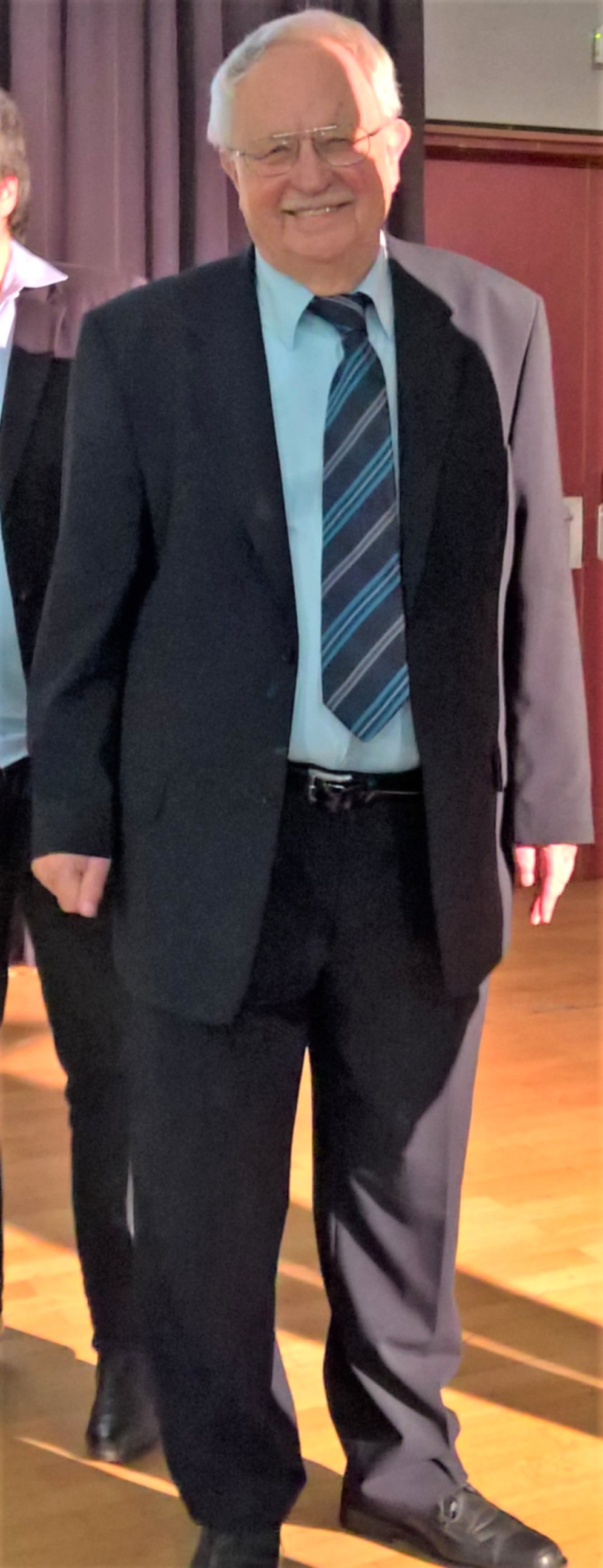
- Born: 15 February 1944; Böhmisch Kamnitz, Nazi Germany
- Died: 17 June 2022 (aged 78)
- Known for: Separator for Heavy Ion reaction Products
- Scientific career
- Fields: Physics
- Workplaces: Goethe University Frankfurt
- Doctoral advisor: Egbert Kankeleit

Sigurd Hofmann (15 February 1944 – 17 June 2022) was a German physicist known for his work on superheavy elements.

== Biography ==
Hofmann was born in Böhmisch Kamnitz, Nazi Germany (now Česká Kamenice, Czech Republic) on 15 February 1944. He discovered his love for physics at the Max Planck High School in Groß-Umstadt, Germany, where he graduated in 1963. He studied physics at the Technical University in Darmstadt (Diploma, 1969, and thesis at the Institute of Nuclear Physics with Egbert Kankeleit and Karl Wien, 1974). From 1974 to 1989 he was responsible for the detection and identification of nuclei produced in heavy ion reactions at the velocity separator SHIP (Separator for Heavy Ion reaction Products) at the GSI Helmholtz Centre for Heavy Ion Research. He was working in the Department Nuclear Chemistry II headed by Peter Armbruster. From 1989 he was leading, after Gottfried Münzenberg, the experiments for the synthesis of new elements. From 1998 he was Honorary Professor at the Goethe-Universität in Frankfurt.

He was the leading scientist with the discovery experiments of the chemical elements darmstadtium (Ds, atomic number 110), roentgenium (Rg, 111) and copernicium (Cn, 112). He made substantial contributions to the discovery experiments of the elements bohrium (Bh, 107), hassium (Hs, 108) and meitnerium (Mt, 109). He participated in the discovery of the element flerovium (Fl, 114) at the Flerov Laboratory of Nuclear Reactions (FLNR) in Dubna, Russia, and his research group confirmed data measured on the synthesis of the elements flerovium and livermorium (Lv, 116) at FLNR. He identified many new isotopes located at the proton drip-line, among those the isotope ^{151}Lu, the first case of radioactive emission of protons from the ground-state of a nucleus. His speciality was nuclear spectroscopy and heavy ion reactions.

He died on 17 June 2022.

== Awards ==
- 1984 "Physics Award" of the German Physical Society (together with Gottfried Münzenberg, Willibrord Reisdorf and Karl-Heinz Schmidt)
- 1996 Otto Hahn Prize of the City of Frankfurt am Main (together with Gottfried Münzenberg)
- 1996 "Doctor honoris causa" of the Faculty of Mathematics and Physics, Comenius University of Bratislava, Slovakia
- 1997 "G.N. Flerov Prize" of the Joint Institute for Nuclear Research (JINR) in Dubna, Russia
- 1998 "Honorary Professor" of the Goethe University in Frankfurt am Main, Germany
- 1998 "SUN-AMCO Medal" of the International Union of Pure and Applied Physics
- 2001 "Doctor honoris causa" of the Joint Institute for Nuclear Research (JINR) in Dubn], Russia
- 2002 "First Prize" of the Joint Institute for Nuclear Research (JINR) in Dubna, Russia
- 2004 "Distinguished Professor" of the Josef Buchmann Foundation and the Department of Physics of the Goethe University in Frankfurt am Main, Germany
- 2006 "Roentgen Medal" of the City of Remscheid-Lennep, Germany, place of birth of Conrad Roentgen
- 2009 "Helmholtz Professor" of the Helmholtz Association of German Research Centres (HGF)
- 2011 "Nicolaus Copernicus Medal" of the Polish Academy of Sciences in Warsaw, Poland
- 2011 "Medal of the City of Toruń" and Nicolaus Copernicus University in Toruń, Poland

== Memberships ==
- German Physical Society
- Academia Europaea
- Member of the Russian Academy of Natural Sciences
- Foreign member of the Polish Academy of Arts and Sciences

== Literature ==
- Sigurd Hofmann: On Beyond Uranium – Journey to the end of the Periodic Table. In: Science Spectra Book Series, Volume 2, V. Moses, Series Editor, ISBN 0-415-28495-3 (hardback), ISBN 0-415-28496-1 (paperback), Taylor and Francis, London and New York, 2002, 216 Seiten, online
- Sigurd Hofmann: Synthesis of superheavy elements by cold fusion. Radiochimica Acta Band 99, 2011, S. 405–428, online
- Sigurd Hofmann and Gottfried Münzenberg: The discovery of the heaviest elements. In: Reviews of Modern Physics, Band 72, 200, pp. 733–767, online
- Sigurd Hofmann: Proton radioactivity. In: Nuclear decay modes, D.N. Poenaru, Editor, ISBN 0-7503-0338-7, IOP Publishing Ltd, 1996, pp. 143–203
