= James Philip Elliott =

British physicist

- Born: 27 July 1929; Gosport
- Died: 21 October 2008 (aged 79)
- Alma mater: University of Southampton
- Awards: Lise Meitner Prize (2002); Institute of Physics Ernest Rutherford Medal and Prize (1994); Fellow of the Royal Society
- Academic career
- Institutions: Atomic Energy Research Establishment (1951–); University of Sussex (1962–1994)
- Doctoral advisor: Hermann Arthur Jahn

James Philip "Phil" Elliott FRS (born 27 July 1929 in Gosport; died 21 October 2008 in Lewes) was a British theoretical nuclear physicist.

== Life ==
Elliott studied at the University of Southampton, where he graduated in physics in 1949 and received his doctorate in theoretical nuclear physics under Hermann Arthur Jahn. From 1951 he was in the theory department of the Atomic Energy Research Establishment in Harwell. First he worked on neutron transport in reactors before turning to the core structure. In cooperation with the head of the theory department Brian Flowers, fundamental work was carried out in the 1950s that helped to unite the shell model with collective models of the core structure. In particular, they investigated the structure of light nuclei (oxygen, fluorine). He was at the University of Rochester for a year and was from 1962 professor at the University of Sussex, where he retired in 1994, but remained scientifically active until his death. From 1979 to 1984 he was dean of the Faculty of Mathematics and Science.

Elliott was a pioneer in the application of group theory in nuclear physics with work on the application of the SU(3) group in the theory of nuclear structure in 1958. He also wrote a monograph on group theory applications in physics. He later developed interaction matrix elements for nuclear structure calculations (for example with Hartree-Fock methods) at the University of Sussex, which were derived from scattering matrix elements of free nucleons and which became known as Sussex Matrix Elements. In the 1980s he dealt with the interacting boson model and its justification in shell theory.

He was married to Mavis Avery and had a son and a daughter. His hobbies were opera and gardening.

== Honours and awards ==
Elliott was elected to the Royal Society in 1980. He was awarded the Ernest Rutherford Medal and Prize of the Institute of Physics in 1994 and the Lise Meitner Prize of the European Physical Society in 2002.
