= Paolo Giubellino =

Italian physicist

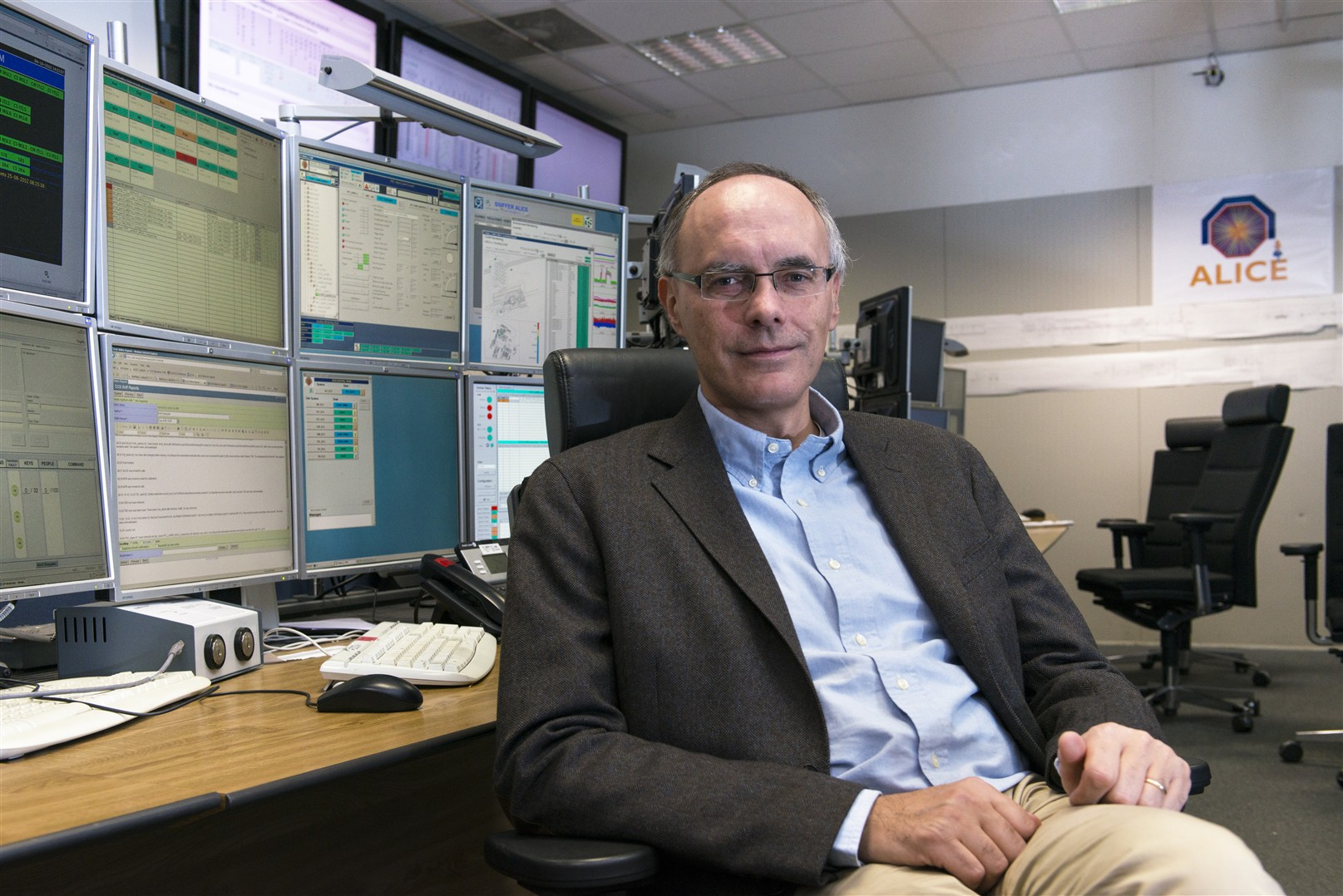
- Giubellino in 2014
- Born: 9 November 1960 (age 65); Turin, Italy
- Education: University of Turin; University of California, Santa Cruz
- Known for: Scientific Managing Director of GSI and FAIR, former Spokesperson of the ALICE Collaboration
- Awards: Lise Meitner Prize; Enrico Fermi Prize; Commendatore of the Italian Republic
- Scientific career
- Fields: Physics (Particle physics)
- Workplaces: CERN, INFN, GSI, FAIR

Paolo Giubellino (born 9 November 1960) is an Italian experimental particle physicist working on High-Energy Nuclear Collisions. Currently he is the joint Scientific Managing Director of the Facility for Antiproton and Ion Research (FAIR) and the GSI Helmholtz Centre for Heavy Ion Research (GSI) and Professor at the Institute of Nuclear Physics of the Technische Universität Darmstadt.

Until 31 December 2016, Giubellino was Spokesperson of the ALICE: A Large Ion Collider Experiment, an international collaboration of more than 1300 people from 163 scientific institutions from 40 countries. He has carried several responsibility positions in the ALICE Collaboration since its creation in the early nineties, to be eventually elected Deputy Spokesperson from 2004 to 2010 and Spokesperson from 1 January 2011. In 2011 at the international symposium on subnuclear physics held in Vatican City, he gave a talk The Little Bang in the Laboratory: Heavy Ions @ LHC with ALICE. On 17 July 2013, he was elected for a second term as Spokesperson of ALICE.

Giubellino has dedicated most of his scientific life to the physics of high-energy heavy ion collisions, in which quark–gluon plasma a state of ultra dense and hot matter, as it prevails in the first microseconds of the life of our universe. Moreover, he has participated in numerous experimental projects first at the CERN Super Proton Synchrotron and, since the beginning of the program, at the Large Hadron Collider.

== Awards ==
- 2000: Honorary title of "Profesor Invitado" of the Istituto de Ciencias y Tecnologias of the University of La Havana, Cuba
- 2010: Medal of the Division of Particles and Fields from the Mexican Physical Society
- 2012: Visitante Distinguido of the City of Puebla, Mexico
- 2012: "commendatore" for scientific merits from Italian President Giorgio Napolitano
- 2013: Honorable Mention of the Ministry of Education, Science, Research and Sport of the Slovak Republic
- 2013: Enrico Fermi Prize from the Italian Physical Society.
- 2014: Lise Meitner Prize from the European Physical Society jointly with Johanna Stachel (Physikalisches Institut der Universität Heidelberg, Germany), Peter Braun-Munzinger (GSI, Germany) and Jürgen Schukraft (CERN).
- 2016: Member of the Academia Europaea
- 2016: Doctor Honoris Causa, Suranaree University of Technology, Thailand
- 2016: Doctor Honoris Causa, National Academy of Sciences of Ukraine, Kyiv, Ukraine
- 2019: Corresponding Member, Accademia delle Scienze, Turin

== Early life and education ==
Paolo Giubellino, Italian, born in 1960, graduated in physics at the University of Turin in 1983 with 110/110 cum laude and special honorable mention and continued his studies as a Fulbright fellow at the University of California, Santa Cruz. In 2000 he was awarded the title of Doctor in Physics and Mathematics (Habilitation) by the Dubna Academic Council (Russia). He is married and has one son.

== Research career ==
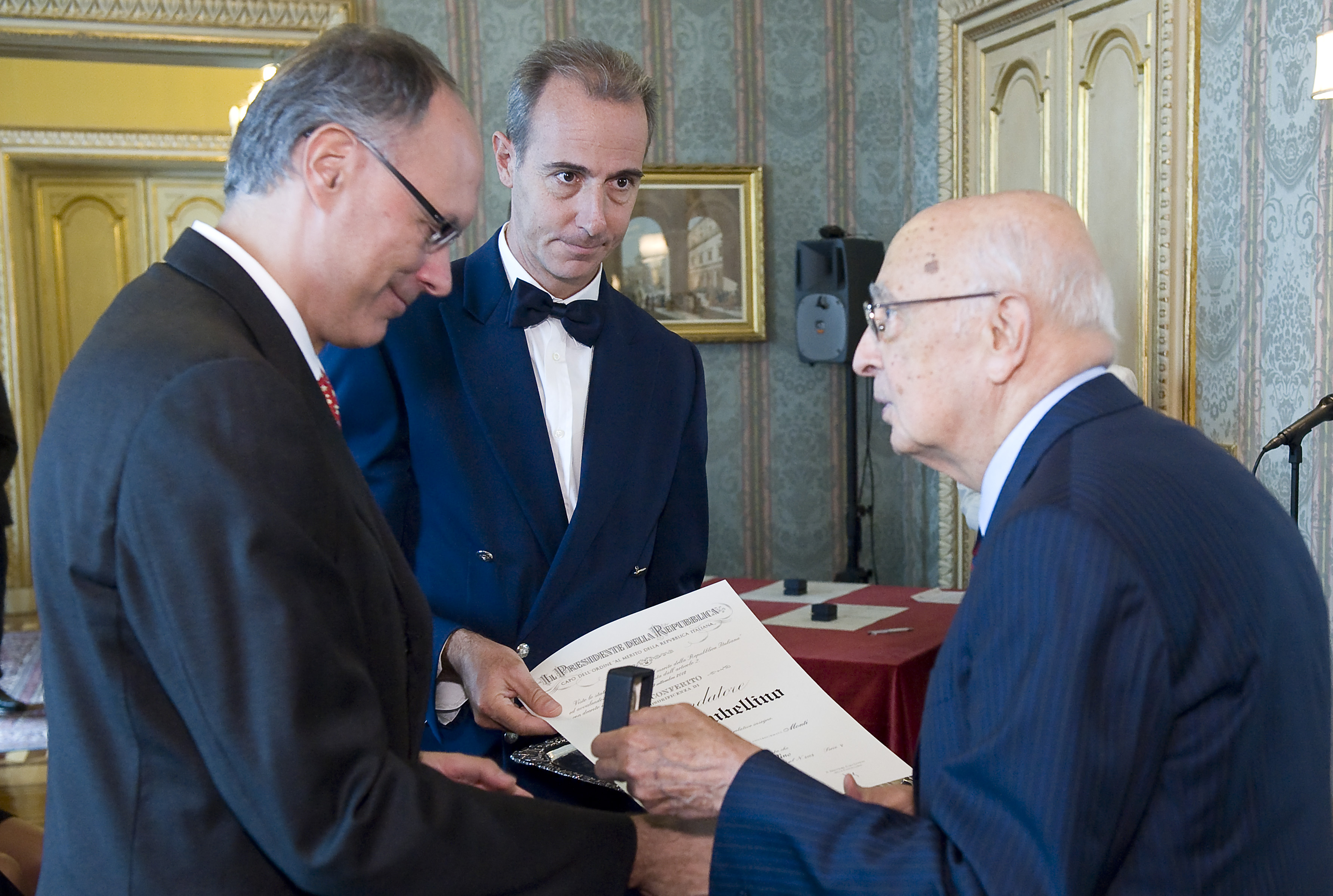
Paolo Giubellino receives from the Italian President Napolitano the title of "commendatore" for scientific merits.

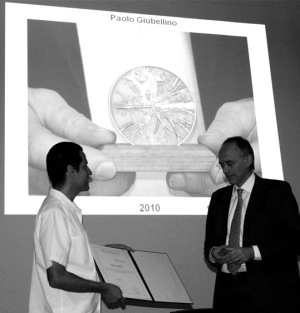
Paolo Giubellino is awarded the Medal of the Division of Particle and Fields by the Mexican Physical Society

Paolo Giubellino has dedicated most of his scientific life to the Physics of High-Energy Heavy-Ion collisions, first in HELIOS, then in NA50, in the ALICE experiment and finally at GSI and FAIR.

He joined the Turin branch of the Istituto Nazionale di Fisica Nucleare (INFN) in 1985. In 2006 he was promoted to "research director", the highest in the three-level INFN career. Giubellino has been responsible for several scientific programs within INF] and for NATO, INTAS and European Union grants. From 1990 to 1996 he was coordinator of the Group II (one of the five sections in which INFN research is organized) of the Turin branch of the INFN. From 1995 to 2000 and since 2007 he was responsible for the involvement of the Turin group in the ALICE Inner Tracking System project.

Giubellino has participated in CERN heavy-ion programme from the early days of his career. He was in charge of the design, construction and operation of the SCI-PAD detector for the NA34/1 experiment as well as for the NA34/2 silicon pad detectors for the Ring Counters.

In 1988 he joined the NA50 collaboration and worked in one of the fixed-target experiments. He was responsible in NA50 for the design, construction and commissioning of the silicon multiplicity detectors (MD).

During his entire career, Giubellino has participated in several R&D projects directed to the development of silicon detectors and radiation tolerant electronics. He is also one of the founding fathers of the microelectronics group at INFN Turin.

Giubellino has been involved in ALICE from the very first feasibility studies, and has later carried a number of responsibilities in the experiment, including Project Leader for the Inner Tracking System, Chair of Conference Committee, Upgrade Coordinator and, for six years, Deputy Spokesperson (July 2000 – September 2002 and August 2006 – December 2010). He was elected Spokesperson of the ALICE Collaboration for the first time in March 2010 and re-elected in July 2013. During this period he led the ALICE Collaboration to the preparation of an Upgrade proposal for experiment, spanning the years 2018 to 2025. The upgrade project, which will involve 163 Institutions from 40 countries, has been approved by the Large Hadron Collider Committee in September 2012.

On 1 January 2017, Paolo Giubellino became the first joint scientific managing director of Facility for Antiproton and Ion Research in Europe GmbH (FAIR GmbH) and GSI Helmholtzzentrum für Schwerionenforschung GmbH in Darmstadt. In addition, he has taken over the position of spokesperson of the management of FAIR and GSI. In September 2016, the FAIR Council and the GSI Supervisory Board announced their decision to appoint Giubellino. Since 1 January 2017 Giubellino is professor at the Institute of Nuclear Physics of the Technische Universität Darmstadt.

== Science Management and Review Committees ==
Paolo Giubellino serves in many scientific committees and panels in France, Germany, Russia, the United States, Mexico, Spain, the Czech Republic, South Korea and South Africa. He has been active in International collaboration, and has promoted and had key roles in several programs funded by the European Union, NATO and numerous bilateral agreements.

- Member since January 2017 of the EMMI Steering Committee of the Extreme Matter Institute (EMMI), Darmstadt, Germany
- Chair, 2003–2011, of the scrutiny group charged of assessing and monitoring the running and maintenance expenses for the CDF International Finance Committee at Fermilab, United States.
- Member, 2003 – 2010, of the Conseil Scientifique of the SUBATECH Laboratory, Nantes, France.
- Member in 2006 of the 4-yearly CNRS/IN2P3 Evaluation Committee of the SUBATECH Laboratory, Nantes, France.
- For the Agence d'Evaluation de la Recherche (AERES) of the French Government: member in 2008 of the Evaluation Committee of the IPN Laboratory in Orsay, Member in 2008 of the Evaluation Committee of the LPSC Laboratory in Grenoble, President in 2010 of the Evaluation Committee of the Subatech Laboratory in Nantes.
- Member, 2010 – end of 2015, of the Scientific Council of the IN2P3 (National Institute of Nuclear and Particle Physics) of France.
- For the GSI Laboratory in Germany (largest German Nuclear Physics Laboratory): Member of the General Physics Advisory Committee (G-PAC) April 2007– March 2010, Chair of the G-PAC from March 2010 until end of 2016 and as such member of the Laboratory Scientific Council.
- Member from Jan 2008 to Dec 2010 of the SPS and PS experiments Committee (SPSC) at CERN.
- Member from August 2009 until September 2016 of the EMMI Program Advisory Committee of the Extreme Matter Institute (EMMI), Darmstadt, Germany
- Member of the "Phases of Nuclear Matter" working group for the 2004 NUPECC (Nuclear Physics European Collaboration Committee) Long Range Plan.
- Convener of the "Phases of nuclear matter" working group for the 2010 NUPECC Long Range Plan.
- Member since August 2000 of the Instrumentation Panel of the ICFA, and therefore member of the International Advisory Committee of the ICFA instrumentation schools.
- Chair of the Scientific Advisory Committee of the HELEN project (2005/2009), the largest among the ALFA programs of scientific cooperation between Europe and Latin America.
- Coordinator Work package 1 of the EPLANET project of scientific cooperation between Europe and Latin America (about 4 M euros, four-year EU program), member of the Scientific Advisory Committee of EPLANET.

Paolo Giubellino is also member of the International Advisory Committee of numerous International Conferences, including the International Conference on High-Energy Physics, ICHEP, and all major conferences in High-Energy Nuclear Physics (Quark Matter, Hard Probes, Strange Quark Matter, ICPAQGP). He has served as referee for several major international Physics Journals, among which Physical Review Letters, Physical Review, Nuclear Physics, Physics Letters and Nuclear Instruments and Methods.

Finally he has been referee for the selection and evaluation of projects for, among others, INTAS, Several European Programs, the Italian Ministry of Education and Research, The Russian Ministry of Education, the Government of the Czech Republic, the Ministry of Economy and Innovation of Spain, the National Research Foundation of the Republic of South Korea and the National Research Foundation of South Africa.

== Invited lectures and outreach ==
Paolo Giubellino is frequently invited to give public lectures on experimental particle physics at the LHC. He has delivered about 50 talks at international conferences and many invited seminars and colloquia about the results of his scientific work, including the closing plenary talk at the 2002 Quark Matter Conference and the plenary talk dedicated to Heavy Ion Physics at the 25th International Nuclear Physics Conference (INPC 2013) in June 2013, and chaired sessions in numerous international conferences. In May 2015, he delivered a talk about the work done at ALICE at the first Italian Conference of Physics Students.

Giubellino has played a significant role in developing collaboration between Europe and Latin American institutes. His support led to Mexico's involvement in ALICE, particularly in the successful construction of the V0 detector and the Cosmic Ray detector. As a recognition of these efforts he has been the first European to be awarded the medal of the Mexican Physical Society.

Giubellino has also taught short courses at various international schools, among which the instrumentation schools of the ICFA and the International school "Enrico Fermi" and for PhD and Master students at the University of Turin.
