= Lise Meitner Prize =

Award of the European Physical Society

The Lise Meitner Prize for nuclear physics, established in 2000, is awarded every two years by the European Physical Society for outstanding work in the fields of experimental, theoretical or applied nuclear science. It is named after Lise Meitner to honour her fundamental contributions to nuclear physics and her courageous and exemplary life. Not to be confused with the Gothenburg Lise Meitner Award.

== Recipients ==
- 2024 Muhsin N. Harakeh, Achim Richter
- 2022 Phil Walker
- 2020 Klaus Blaum, Björn Jonson, Piet Van Duppen
- 2018 Peter Ring, Peter Schuck
- 2016 Ulf G. Meissner
- 2014 Johanna Stachel, Peter Braun-Munzinger, Paolo Giubellino, Jürgen Schukraft
- 2012 Karlheinz Langanke, Friedrich-Karl Thielemann
- 2010 Juha Äystö
- 2008 Reinhard Stock, Walter Greiner
- 2006 Heinz-Jürgen Kluge, David M. Brink
- 2004 Bent Herskind, Peter J. Twin
- 2002 Phil Elliott, Francesco Iachello
- 2000 Peter Armbruster, Gottfried Münzenberg, Yuri Oganessian

== See also ==
- List of physics awards
