= Peter J. Twin =

British physicist

Peter John Twin (born 26 July 1939 in London) is a British experimental nuclear physicist. He is known for his research into the structure of atomic nuclei, based upon his pioneering work on techniques of gamma ray spectroscopy and, specifically, the Total Energy Suppression Shield Array (TESSA).

== Education and career ==
Peter J. Twin graduated from the University of Liverpool with a BSc in 1960 and a PhD in 1964. At the University of Liverpool, he became a lecturer in 1964, a Senior Lecturer in 1973, a Reader in 1979, Sir James Chadwick Professor of Experimental Physics in 1987, Lyon James Professor of Physics in 1997, and a Senior Fellow and Professor Emeritus in 2001. From 1983 to 1987 he was also Head of the Nuclear Structure Facility at the Daresbury Laboratory, which is about 30 kilometres from Liverpool. For the academic year 1968–1969 he was a visiting professor at the University of Alberta.

In 1986, his science team discovered superdeformed nuclei with a high spin (with an observation of a yrast line in the gamma spectrum). In 1991 Daniel Kleppner judged Twin's discovery of superdeformed nuclei to be one most important discoveries in physics in the years from 1986 to 1991. In retrospect, the phenomenon was also observed in 1962 when spontaneous fission of isomers in heavy nuclei was discovered by Sergey Polikanov (1926–1994).

In 1991, Twin received the John Price Wetherill Medal from the Franklin Institute. In 1991 he also won the American Physical Society's Tom W. Bonner Prize in Nuclear Physics.

Following the success of TESSA III, he collaborated with Francis Beck, director of the Centre de recherches nucléaires (CRN) at Strasbourg, on leading the French-British development of the more advanced gamma ray detectors of the Eurogam project. Eurogam I became operational in 1992 at Daresbury, and Eurogam II became operational in 1994 at Strasbourg. The detector arrays of Eurogam culminated in the EUROBALL detector array (which became operational in 1996).

Twin was made OBE in 1991 and elected in 1993 a Fellow of the Royal Society. In 2004 he was awarded, jointly with Bent Herskind, the European Physical Society's Lise Meitner Prize.

== Selected publications ==
- Twin, P. J.; Nolan, P. J.; Aryaeinejad, R.; Love, D. J. G.; Nelson, A. H.; Kirwan, A. (1983). "TESSA: A multi-detector γ-ray array designed to study high spin states". Nuclear Physics A. 409: 343–351. Bibcode:1983NuPhA.409..343T. doi:10.1016/0375-9474(83)90696-6.
- Nolan, P. J.; Twin, P. J. (1988). "Superdeformed shapes at high angular momentum". Annual Review of Nuclear and Particle Science. 38 (1): 533–562. Bibcode:1988ARNPS..38..533T. doi:10.1146/annurev.ns.38.120188.002533.
- Twin, P. J.; Nyakó, B. M.; Nelson, A. H.; Simpson, J.; Bentley, M. A.; Cranmer-Gordon, H. W.; Forsyth, P. D.; Howe, D.; Mokhtar, A. R.; Morrison, J. D.; Sharpey-Schafer, J. F.; Sletten, G. (1986). "Observation of a Discrete-Line Superdeformed Band up to 60ℏ in ^{152}Dy". Physical Review Letters. 57 (7): 811–814. Bibcode:1986PhRvL..57..811T. doi:10.1103/PhysRevLett.57.811. PMID 10034167.
- Byrski, T.; Beck, F. A.; Curien, D.; Schuck, C.; Fallon, P.; Alderson, A.; Ali, I.; Bentley, M. A.; Bruce, A. M.; Forsyth, P. D.; Howe, D.; Roberts, J. W.; Sharpey-Schafer, J. F.; Smith, G.; Twin, P. J. (1990). "Observation of identical superdeformed bands in N=86 nuclei". Physical Review Letters. 64 (14): 1650–1653. Bibcode:1990PhRvL..64.1650B. doi:10.1103/PhysRevLett.64.1650. PMID 10041452.
- Nazarewicz, W.; Twin, P. J.; Fallon, P.; Garrett, J. D. (1990). "Natural-parity states in superdeformed bands and pseudo SU(3) symmetry at extreme conditions". Physical Review Letters. 64 (14): 1654–1657. Bibcode:1990PhRvL..64.1654N. doi:10.1103/PhysRevLett.64.1654. PMID 10041453.
- Twin, P.J. (1990). "Superdeformation — an experimental overview". Nuclear Physics A. 520: c17–c33. Bibcode:1990NuPhA.520...17T. doi:10.1016/0375-9474(90)91131-A.
- Beausang, C.W.; Forbes, S.A.; Fallon, P.; Nolan, P.J.; Twin, P.J.; Mo, J.N.; Lisle, J.C.; Bentley, M.A.; Simpson, J.; Beck, F.A.; Curien, D.; Defrance, G.; Duchêne, G.; Popescu, D. (1992). "Measurements on prototype Ge and BGO detectors for the Eurogam array". Nuclear Instruments and Methods in Physics Research Section A: Accelerators, Spectrometers, Detectors and Associated Equipment. 313 (1–2): 37–49. Bibcode:1992NIMPA.313...37B. doi:10.1016/0168-9002(92)90084-H.
- Flibotte, S.; et al. (1993). "ΔI=4 bifurcation in a superdeformed band: Evidence for a C_{4} symmetry". Physical Review Letters. 71 (26): 4299–4302. Bibcode:1993PhRvL..71.4299F. doi:10.1103/PhysRevLett.71.4299. PMID 10055211. (Flibotte collaborated with 29 co-authors, among whom is P. J. Twin.)
- Duchêne, G.; Beck, F.A.; Twin, P.J.; De France, G.; Curien, D.; Han, L.; Beausang, C.W.; Bentley, M.A.; Nolan, P.J.; Simpson, J. (1999). "The Clover: A new generation of composite Ge detectors". Nuclear Instruments and Methods in Physics Research Section A: Accelerators, Spectrometers, Detectors and Associated Equipment. 432 (1): 90–110. Bibcode:1999NIMPA.432...90D. doi:10.1016/S0168-9002(99)00277-6. (over 450 citations)
