= Reinhard Stock =

German physicist

Reinhard Stock (born 1938) is a German experimental physicist, specializing in heavy-ion physics.

== Education and career ==
Stock studied at Heidelberg University, where he received his doctorate with thesis advisor Rudolf Bock. Stock was a postdoc at the University of Pennsylvania, where he worked on biophysics. From 1985 until his retirement in 2004, he was a professor at the Institute for Nuclear Physics at the Goethe University Frankfurt, where he was head of the institute for a time. He has been a Senior Fellow at the Frankfurt Institute for Advanced Studies (FIAS) since 2007.

During the 1970s Stock did pioneering work with Hans Gutbrod and Rudolf Bock in setting up relativistic heavy ion experiments at Lawrence Berkeley National Laboratory (LBNL), where he worked on Bevalac with Arthur Poskanzer. Stock continued such research from the mid-1980s with higher energies at CERN. He was a longtime spokesman for the NA49 experiment there. In a series of experiments started in 1994, the CERN scientists used the Super Proton Synchrotron (SPS) to create a quark–gluon plasma in relativistic collisions between lead nuclei and to indirectly detect the decay of the quark–gluon plasma into neutrons and protons. In a conference held in Turin in May 1999, the hundreds of CERN scientists from 22 countries reached a consensus that their combined results confirm the hypothesis that quarks become deconfined at high energy densities.

From 1999 to 2004 he chaired the Scientific Council of the GSI Helmholtz Center for Heavy Ion Research.

He received in 1988, jointly with Hans Gutbrod, the German Physical Society's Robert Wichard Pohl Prize. In 1989 the German Research Foundation awarded him the Leibniz Prize. In 2008 he and Walter Greiner received the European Physical Society's Lise Meitner Prize for research on relativistic heavy ion physics. Stock was cited "for his outstanding contributions to the development of the field of relativistic nucleus-nucleus collisions by initiating research through the innovative use of high-energy accelerators (BEVALAC at LBL, SPS at CERN) which indicated the existence of a new form of matter".

== Selected publications ==
=== Articles ===
- Gutbrod, H. H.; Sandoval, A.; Johansen, P. J.; Poskanzer, A. M.; Gosset, J.; Meyer, W. G.; Westfall, G. D.; Stock, R. (1976). "Final-State Interactions in the Production of Hydrogen and Helium Isotopes by Relativistic Heavy Ions on Uranium". Physical Review Letters. 37 (11): 667–670. Bibcode:1976PhRvL..37..667G. doi:10.1103/PhysRevLett.37.667. S2CID 121924862.
- Westfall, G. D.; Gosset, J.; Johansen, P. J.; Poskanzer, A. M.; Meyer, W. G.; Gutbrod, H. H.; Sandoval, A.; Stock, R. (1976). "Nuclear Fireball Model for Proton Inclusive Spectra from Relativistic Heavy-Ion Collisions". Physical Review Letters. 37 (18): 1202–1205. Bibcode:1976PhRvL..37.1202W. doi:10.1103/PhysRevLett.37.1202. S2CID 123322058.
- Gosset, J.; Gutbrod, H. H.; Meyer, W. G.; Poskanzer, A. M.; Sandoval, A.; Stock, R.; Westfall, G. D. (1977). "Central collisions of relativistic heavy ions". Physical Review C. 16 (2): 629–657. Bibcode:1977PhRvC..16..629G. doi:10.1103/PhysRevC.16.629.
- Stock, R. (1986). "Particle production in high energy nucleus-nucleus collisions". Physics Reports. 135 (5): 259–315. Bibcode:1986PhR...135..259S. doi:10.1016/0370-1573(86)90134-1.
- Stock, Reinhard (1989). "The physics of dense nuclear matter from supernovae to quark gluon plasma". Nature. 337 (6205): 319–324. Bibcode:1989Natur.337..319S. doi:10.1038/337319a0. S2CID 4307956.
- Stock, R. (1999). "Quark matter 99 summary: Hadronic signals". Nuclear Physics A. 661 (1–4): 282–299. arXiv:hep-ph/9911408. Bibcode:1999NuPhA.661..282S. doi:10.1016/S0375-9474(99)85027-1. S2CID 14268417.
- Stock, Reinhard (2002). "Strange quarks in matter". Journal of Physics G: Nuclear and Particle Physics. 28 (7): 1517–1526. Bibcode:2002JPhG...28.1517S. doi:10.1088/0954-3899/28/7/301.
- Stock, Reinhard (2004). "Relativistic nucleus–nucleus collisions: from the BEVALAC to RHIC". Journal of Physics G: Nuclear and Particle Physics. 30 (8): S633 – S48. arXiv:nucl-ex/0405007. Bibcode:2004JPhG...30S.633S. doi:10.1088/0954-3899/30/8/001.
- Stock, Reinhard (2007). "Hadron Formation in High Energy Elementary and Nuclear Collisions". International Journal of Modern Physics E. 16 (3): 687–714. Bibcode:2007IJMPE..16..687S. doi:10.1142/S0218301307006216.
- Stock, Reinhard (2008). "7 Relativistic Nucleus-Nucleus Collisions and the QCD Matter Phase Diagram". Theory and Experiments. Landolt-Börnstein - Group I Elementary Particles, Nuclei and Atoms. Vol. 21A. pp. 225–315. arXiv:0807.1610. doi:10.1007/978-3-540-74203-6_7. ISBN 978-3-540-74202-9. S2CID 118228442. arXiv preprint

=== Books ===
- Satz, Helmut; Specht, Hans J.; Stock, Reinhard, eds. (6 December 2012). Quark Matter: Proceedings of the Sixth International Conference on Ultra-Relativistic Nucleus-Nucleus Collisions — Quark Matter 1987 Nordkirchen, FRG, 24–28 August 1987. Springer. ISBN 9783642835247. originally published as Zeitschrift für Physik C – Particles and Fields. Springer Verlag. 38 (1/2). 1988. ISSN 0170-9739
- Stock, Reinhard, ed. (2009). Encyclopedia of Applied High Energy and Particle Physics. Wiley/VCH. ISBN 978-3-527-40691-3.; 2013 e-book edition
- Stock, Reinhard, ed. (2010). Relativistic Heavy Ion Physics. Elementary Particles, Nuclei and Atoms 23. Springer-Verlag. ISBN 978-3-642-01538-0.
