= Gottfried Münzenberg =

German physicist (1940–2024)

- Born: 17 March 1940; Nordhausen, Germany
- Died: 2 January 2024 (aged 83); Greifswald, Mecklenburg-Vorpommern, Germany
- Education: University of Giessen; University of Innsbruck
- Alma mater: GSI Helmholtz Centre for Heavy Ion Research; University of Mainz
- Occupation: physicist
- Known for: Discovery of superheavy elements
- Awards: Lise Meitner Prize (2000); Otto Hahn Prize (1996)

Gottfried Münzenberg (17 March 1940 – 2 January 2024) was a German physicist.

== Life and career ==
Gottfried Münzenberg was born on 17 March 1940, into a family of Protestant ministers (father Pastor Heinz and mother Helene Münzenberg). All his life he was deeply concerned about the philosophical and theological implications of physics. He studied physics at Justus-Liebig-Universität in Giessen and Leopold-Franzens-Universität Innsbruck and completed his studies with a Ph.D. at the University of Giessen, Germany, in 1971. In 1976, he moved to the department of nuclear chemistry at GSI in Darmstadt, Germany, which was headed by Peter Armbruster. He played a leading role in the construction of SHIP, the 'Separator of Heavy Ion Reaction Products'. He was the driving force in the discovery of the cold heavy ion fusion and the discovery of the elements bohrium (Z = 107), hassium (Z = 108), meitnerium (Z = 109), darmstadtium (Z = 110), roentgenium (Z = 111), and copernicium (Z = 112). In 1984, he became head of the new GSI project, the fragment separator, a project which opened new research topics, such as interactions of relativistic heavy ions with matter, production and separation of exotic nuclear beams and structure of exotic nuclei. He directed the Nuclear Structure and Nuclear Chemistry department of the GSI and was professor of physics at the University of Mainz until he retired in March 2005.

Among the rewards he received should be mentioned the Röntgen-Prize of the University of Giessen in 1983 and (together with Sigurd Hofmann) the Otto Hahn Prize of the City of Frankfurt am Main in 1996.

Münzenberg died in Greifswald on 2 January 2024, at the age of 83.
