= Hassium =

Hassium, _{108}Hs
Hassium
- Pronunciation: /ˈhæsiəm/ (HASS-ee-əm)
- Mass number: [271] (data not decisive) (Note: The most stable isotope of hassium cannot be determined based on existing data due to uncertainty that arises from the low number of measurements. The half-life of ^{271}Hs corresponding to one standard deviation is, based on existing data, 46+56 −16 seconds, whereas that of ^{269}Hs is 13+10 −4 seconds; these measurements have overlapping confidence intervals. It is also possible that ^{277m}Hs is more stable than both of these, with its half-life likely being 110±70 seconds, but only one event of decay of this isotope has been registered as of 2016.)

Hassium in the periodic table
| Hydrogen | | | | | | | | | | | | | | | | | | | | | | | | | | | | | | | Helium |
| Lithium | Beryllium | | | | | | | | | | | | | | | | | | | | | | | | | Boron | Carbon | Nitrogen | Oxygen | Fluorine | Neon |
| Sodium | Magnesium | | | | | | | | | | | | | | | | | | | | | | | | | Aluminium | Silicon | Phosphorus | Sulfur | Chlorine | Argon |
| Potassium | Calcium | | | | | | | | | | | | | | | Scandium | Titanium | Vanadium | Chromium | Manganese | Iron | Cobalt | Nickel | Copper | Zinc | Gallium | Germanium | Arsenic | Selenium | Bromine | Krypton |
| Rubidium | Strontium | | | | | | | | | | | | | | | Yttrium | Zirconium | Niobium | Molybdenum | Technetium | Ruthenium | Rhodium | Palladium | Silver | Cadmium | Indium | Tin | Antimony | Tellurium | Iodine | Xenon |
| Caesium | Barium | Lanthanum | Cerium | Praseodymium | Neodymium | Promethium | Samarium | Europium | Gadolinium | Terbium | Dysprosium | Holmium | Erbium | Thulium | Ytterbium | Lutetium | Hafnium | Tantalum | Tungsten | Rhenium | Osmium | Iridium | Platinum | Gold | Mercury (element) | Thallium | Lead | Bismuth | Polonium | Astatine | Radon |
| Francium | Radium | Actinium | Thorium | Protactinium | Uranium | Neptunium | Plutonium | Americium | Curium | Berkelium | Californium | Einsteinium | Fermium | Mendelevium | Nobelium | Lawrencium | Rutherfordium | Dubnium | Seaborgium | Bohrium | Hassium | Meitnerium | Darmstadtium | Roentgenium | Copernicium | Nihonium | Flerovium | Moscovium | Livermorium | Tennessine | Oganesson |
Os
↑
Hs
↓
—
bohrium ← hassium → meitnerium
- Atomic number (Z): 108
- Group: group 8
- Period: period 7
- Block: d-block
- Electron configuration: [Rn] 5f^{14} 6d^{6} 7s^{2}
- Electrons per shell: 2, 8, 18, 32, 32, 14, 2

Physical properties
- Phase at STP: solid (predicted)
- Density (near r.t.): 27–29 g/cm^{3} (predicted)

Atomic properties
- Oxidation states: common: (none) +8 (+3), (+4), (+6), (+8)
- Ionization energies: 1st: 730 kJ/mol; 2nd: 1760 kJ/mol; 3rd: 2830 kJ/mol; (more) (predicted)
- Atomic radius: empirical: 126 pm (estimated)
- Covalent radius: 134 pm (estimated)

Other properties
- Natural occurrence: synthetic
- Crystal structure: hexagonal close-packed (hcp) (predicted)
- CAS Number: 54037-57-9

History
- Naming: after Hassia, Latin for Hesse, Germany, where it was discovered
- Discovery: Gesellschaft für Schwerionenforschung (1984)

Isotopes of hassium
| Main isotopes | | | Decay | |
| Isotope | abundance | half-life (t_{1/2}) | mode | product |
|---|---|---|---|---|
| ^{269}Hs | synth | 13 s | α | ^{265}Sg |
| ^{270}Hs | synth | 7.6 s | α | ^{266}Sg |
| ^{271}Hs | synth | 46 s | α | ^{267}Sg |
| ^{277m}Hs | synth | 130 s? | SF | – |

Hassium is a synthetic chemical element; it has symbol Hs and atomic number 108. It is highly radioactive: its most stable known isotopes have half-lives of about ten seconds. One of its isotopes, ^{270}Hs, has magic numbers of protons and neutrons for deformed nuclei, giving it greater stability against spontaneous fission. Hassium is a superheavy element; it has been produced in a laboratory in very small quantities by fusing heavy nuclei with lighter ones. Natural occurrences of hassium have been hypothesized but never found.

In the periodic table, hassium is a transactinide element, a member of period 7 and group 8; it is thus the sixth member of the 6d series of transition metals. Chemistry experiments have confirmed that hassium behaves as the heavier homologue to osmium, reacting readily with oxygen to form a volatile tetroxide. The chemical properties of hassium have been only partly characterized, but they compare well with the chemistry of the other group 8 elements.

The main innovation that led to the discovery of hassium was cold fusion (not to be confused with irreproducible claims of fusion in room-temperature electrochemical setups), where the fused nuclei do not differ by mass as much as in earlier techniques. It relied on greater stability of target nuclei, which in turn decreased excitation energy. This decreased the number of neutrons ejected during synthesis, creating heavier, more stable resulting nuclei. The technique was first tested at Joint Institute for Nuclear Research (JINR) in Dubna, Moscow Oblast, Russian SFSR, Soviet Union, in 1974. JINR used this technique to attempt synthesis of element 108 in 1978, in 1983, and in 1984; the latter experiment resulted in a claim that element 108 had been produced. Later in 1984, a synthesis claim followed from the Gesellschaft für Schwerionenforschung (GSI) in Darmstadt, Hesse, West Germany. The 1993 report by the Transfermium Working Group, formed by the International Union of Pure and Applied Chemistry (IUPAC) and the International Union of Pure and Applied Physics (IUPAP), concluded that the report from Darmstadt was conclusive on its own whereas that from Dubna was not, and major credit was assigned to the German scientists. GSI formally announced they wished to name the element hassium after the German state of Hesse (Hassia in Latin), home to the facility in 1992; this name was accepted as final in 1997.

== Introduction to the heaviest elements ==
=== Synthesis of superheavy nuclei ===
A graphic depiction of a nuclear fusion reaction. Two nuclei fuse into one, emitting a neutron. Reactions that created new elements to this moment were similar, though varying numbers of neutrons – or alternatively charged particles – may be emitted instead.

A superheavy (Note: In nuclear physics, an element is called heavy if its atomic number is high; lead (element 82) is one example of such a heavy element. The term "superheavy elements" typically refers to elements with atomic number greater than 103 (although there are other definitions, such as atomic number greater than 100 or 112; sometimes, the term is presented an equivalent to the term "transactinide", which puts an upper limit before the beginning of the hypothetical superactinide series). Terms "heavy isotopes" (of a given element) and "heavy nuclei" mean what could be understood in the common language—isotopes of high mass (for the given element) and nuclei of high mass, respectively.) atomic nucleus is created in a nuclear reaction that combines two other nuclei of unequal size (Note: In 2009, a team at the JINR led by Oganessian published results of their attempt to create hassium in a symmetric ^{136}Xe + ^{136}Xe reaction. They failed to observe a single atom in such a reaction, putting the upper limit on the cross section, the measure of probability of a nuclear reaction, as 2.5 pb. In comparison, the reaction that resulted in hassium discovery, ^{208}Pb + ^{58}Fe, had a cross section of ~20 pb (more specifically, 19^{+19}_{-11} pb), as estimated by the discoverers.) into one; roughly, the more unequal the two nuclei in terms of mass, the greater the possibility that the two react. The material made of the heavier nuclei is made into a target, which is then bombarded by the beam of lighter nuclei. Two nuclei can only fuse into one if they are close enough to each other; normally, nuclei (all positively charged) repel each other due to electrostatic repulsion. The strong interaction can overcome this repulsion but only within a very short distance from a nucleus; beam nuclei are thus greatly accelerated in order to make such repulsion insignificant compared to the velocity of the beam nucleus. The energy applied to the beam nuclei to accelerate them can cause them to reach speeds as high as one-tenth of the speed of light. However, if too much energy is applied, the beam nucleus can fall apart.

Coming close enough alone is not enough for two nuclei to fuse: when two nuclei approach each other, they usually remain together for about 10^{−20} seconds and then part ways (not necessarily in the same composition as before the reaction) rather than form a single nucleus. This happens because during the attempted formation of a single nucleus, electrostatic repulsion tears apart the nucleus that is being formed. Each pair of a target and a beam is characterized by its cross section—the probability that fusion will occur if two nuclei approach one another expressed in terms of the transverse area that the incident particle must hit in order for the fusion to occur. (Note: The amount of energy applied to the beam particle to accelerate it can also influence the value of cross section. For example, in the ^{28}_{14}Si + ^{1}_{0}n → ^{28}_{13}Al + ^{1}_{1}p reaction, cross section changes smoothly from 370 mb at 12.3 MeV to 160 mb at 18.3 MeV, with a broad peak at 13.5 MeV with the maximum value of 380 mb.) This fusion may occur as a result of the quantum effect in which nuclei can tunnel through electrostatic repulsion. If the two nuclei can stay close past that phase, multiple nuclear interactions result in redistribution of energy and an energy equilibrium.

External videos
- Visualization of unsuccessful nuclear fusion, based on calculations from the Australian National University

The resulting merger is an excited state—termed a compound nucleus—and thus it is very unstable. To reach a more stable state, the temporary merger may fission without formation of a more stable nucleus. Alternatively, the compound nucleus may eject a few neutrons, which would carry away the excitation energy; if the latter is not sufficient for a neutron expulsion, the merger would produce a gamma ray. This happens in about 10^{−16} seconds after the initial nuclear collision and results in creation of a more stable nucleus. The definition by the IUPAC/IUPAP Joint Working Party (JWP) states that a chemical element can only be recognized as discovered if a nucleus of it exists for at least 10^{−14} seconds. This value was chosen as an estimate of how long it takes a nucleus to acquire electrons and thus display its chemical properties. (Note: This figure also marks the generally accepted upper limit for lifetime of a compound nucleus.)

=== Decay and detection ===
The beam passes through the target and reaches the next chamber, the separator; if a new nucleus is produced, it is carried with this beam. In the separator, the newly produced nucleus is separated from other nuclides (that of the original beam and any other reaction products) (Note: This separation is based on that the resulting nuclei move past the target more slowly then the unreacted beam nuclei. The separator contains electric and magnetic fields whose effects on a moving particle cancel out for a specific velocity of a particle. Such separation can also be aided by a time-of-flight measurement and a recoil energy measurement; a combination of the two may allow to estimate the mass of a nucleus.) and transferred to a surface-barrier detector, which stops the nucleus. The exact location of the upcoming impact on the detector is marked; also marked are its energy and the time of the arrival. The transfer takes about 10^{−6} seconds; in order to be detected, the nucleus must survive this long. The nucleus is recorded again once its decay is registered, and the location, the energy, and the time of the decay are measured.

Stability of a nucleus is provided by the strong interaction. However, its range is very short; as nuclei become larger, its influence on the outermost nucleons (protons and neutrons) weakens. At the same time, the nucleus is torn apart by electrostatic repulsion between protons, and its range is not limited. Total binding energy provided by the strong interaction increases linearly with the number of nucleons, whereas electrostatic repulsion increases with the square of the atomic number, i.e. the latter grows faster and becomes increasingly important for heavy and superheavy nuclei. Superheavy nuclei are thus theoretically predicted and have so far been observed to predominantly decay via decay modes that are caused by such repulsion: alpha decay and spontaneous fission. (Note: Not all decay modes are caused by electrostatic repulsion. For example, beta decay is caused by the weak interaction.) Almost all alpha emitters have over 210 nucleons, and the lightest nuclide primarily undergoing spontaneous fission has 238. In both decay modes, nuclei are inhibited from decaying by corresponding energy barriers for each mode, but they can be tunneled through.

Scheme of an apparatus for creation of superheavy elements, based on the Dubna Gas-Filled Recoil Separator set up in the Flerov Laboratory of Nuclear Reactions in JINR. The trajectory within the detector and the beam focusing apparatus changes because of a dipole magnet in the former and quadrupole magnets in the latter.

Alpha particles are commonly produced in radioactive decays because the mass of an alpha particle per nucleon is small enough to leave some energy for the alpha particle to be used as kinetic energy to leave the nucleus. Spontaneous fission is caused by electrostatic repulsion tearing the nucleus apart and produces various nuclei in different instances of identical nuclei fissioning. As the atomic number increases, spontaneous fission rapidly becomes more important: spontaneous fission partial half-lives decrease by 23 orders of magnitude from uranium (element 92) to nobelium (element 102), and by 30 orders of magnitude from thorium (element 90) to fermium (element 100). The earlier liquid drop model thus suggested that spontaneous fission would occur nearly instantly due to disappearance of the fission barrier for nuclei with about 280 nucleons. The later nuclear shell model suggested that nuclei with about 300 nucleons would form an island of stability in which nuclei will be more resistant to spontaneous fission and will primarily undergo alpha decay with longer half-lives. Subsequent discoveries suggested that the predicted island might be further than originally anticipated; they also showed that nuclei intermediate between the long-lived actinides and the predicted island are deformed, and gain additional stability from shell effects. Experiments on lighter superheavy nuclei, as well as those closer to the expected island, have shown greater than previously anticipated stability against spontaneous fission, showing the importance of shell effects on nuclei. (Note: It was already known by the 1960s that ground states of nuclei differed in energy and shape as well as that certain magic numbers of nucleons corresponded to greater stability of a nucleus. However, it was assumed that there was no nuclear structure in superheavy nuclei as they were too deformed to form one.)

Alpha decays are registered by the emitted alpha particles, and the decay products are easy to determine before the actual decay; if such a decay or a series of consecutive decays produces a known nucleus, the original product of a reaction can be easily determined. (Note: Since mass of a nucleus is not measured directly but is rather calculated from that of another nucleus, such measurement is called indirect. Direct measurements are also possible, but for the most part they have remained unavailable for superheavy nuclei. The first direct measurement of mass of a superheavy nucleus was reported in 2018 at LBNL. Mass was determined from the location of a nucleus after the transfer (the location helps determine its trajectory, which is linked to the mass-to-charge ratio of the nucleus, since the transfer was done in presence of a magnet).) (That all decays within a decay chain were indeed related to each other is established by the location of these decays, which must be in the same place.) The known nucleus can be recognized by the specific characteristics of decay it undergoes such as decay energy (or more specifically, the kinetic energy of the emitted particle). (Note: If the decay occurred in a vacuum, then since total momentum of an isolated system before and after the decay must be preserved, the daughter nucleus would also receive a small velocity. The ratio of the two velocities, and accordingly the ratio of the kinetic energies, would thus be inverse to the ratio of the two masses. The decay energy equals the sum of the known kinetic energy of the alpha particle and that of the daughter nucleus (an exact fraction of the former). The calculations hold for an experiment as well, but the difference is that the nucleus does not move after the decay because it is tied to the detector.) Spontaneous fission, however, produces various nuclei as products, so the original nuclide cannot be determined from its daughters. (Note: Spontaneous fission was discovered by Soviet physicist Georgy Flerov, a leading scientist at JINR, and thus it was a "hobbyhorse" for the facility. In contrast, the LBL scientists believed fission information was not sufficient for a claim of synthesis of an element. They believed spontaneous fission had not been studied enough to use it for identification of a new element, since there was a difficulty of establishing that a compound nucleus had only ejected neutrons and not charged particles like protons or alpha particles. They thus preferred to link new isotopes to the already known ones by successive alpha decays.)

The information available to physicists aiming to synthesize a superheavy element is thus the information collected at the detectors: location, energy, and time of arrival of a particle to the detector, and those of its decay. The physicists analyze this data and seek to conclude that it was indeed caused by a new element and could not have been caused by a different nuclide than the one claimed. Often, provided data is insufficient for a conclusion that a new element was definitely created and there is no other explanation for the observed effects; errors in interpreting data have been made. (Note: For instance, element 102 was mistakenly identified in 1957 at the Nobel Institute of Physics in Stockholm, Stockholm County, Sweden. There were no earlier definitive claims of creation of this element, and the element was assigned a name by its Swedish, American, and British discoverers, nobelium. It was later shown that the identification was incorrect. The following year, RL was unable to reproduce the Swedish results and announced instead their synthesis of the element; that claim was also disproved later. JINR insisted that they were the first to create the element and suggested a name of their own for the new element, joliotium; the Soviet name was also not accepted (JINR later referred to the naming of the element 102 as "hasty"). This name was proposed to IUPAC in a written response to their ruling on priority of discovery claims of elements, signed 29 September 1992. The name "nobelium" remained unchanged on account of its widespread usage.)

== Discovery ==
Scheme of an apparatus for creating superheavy elements, based on the Dubna Gas-Filled Recoil Separator set up in the Flerov Laboratory of Nuclear Reactions in JINR. The trajectory within the detector and the beam focusing apparatus changes because of a dipole magnet in the former and quadrupole magnets in the latter.

=== Cold fusion ===
Nuclear reactions used in the 1960s resulted in high excitation energies that required expulsion of four or five neutrons; these reactions used targets made of elements with high atomic numbers to maximize the size difference between the two nuclei in a reaction. While this increased the chance of fusion due to the lower electrostatic repulsion between target and projectile, the formed compound nuclei often broke apart and did not survive to form a new element. Moreover, fusion inevitably produces neutron-poor nuclei, as heavier elements need more neutrons per proton for stability; (Note: Generally, heavier nuclei require more neutrons because as the number of protons increases, so does electrostatic repulsion between them. This repulsion is balanced by the binding energy generated by the strong interaction between quarks within nucleons; it is enough to hold the quarks together in a nucleon together and some of it is left for binding of different nucleons. The more nucleons in a nucleus, the more energy there is for binding the nucleons (greater total binding energy does not necessarily mean greater binding energy per nucleon). However, having too many neutrons per proton, while decreasing electrostatic repulsion per nucleon, results in beta decay.) therefore, the necessary ejection of neutrons results in final products that are typically shorter-lived. As such, light beams (six to ten protons) allowed synthesis of elements only up to 106.

To advance to heavier elements, Soviet physicist Yuri Oganessian at Joint Institute for Nuclear Research (JINR) in Dubna, Moscow Oblast, Russian SFSR, Soviet Union, proposed a different mechanism, in which the bombarded nucleus would be lead-208, which has magic numbers of protons and neutrons, or another nucleus close to it. Each proton and neutron has a fixed rest energy; those of all protons are equal and so are those of all neutrons. In a nucleus, some of this energy is diverted to binding protons and neutrons; if a nucleus has a magic number of protons and/or neutrons, then even more of its rest energy is diverted, which makes the nuclide more stable. This additional stability requires more energy for an external nucleus to break the existing one and penetrate it. More energy diverted to binding nucleons means less rest energy, which in turn means less mass (mass is proportional to rest energy). More equal atomic numbers of the reacting nuclei result in greater electrostatic repulsion between them, but the lower mass excess of the target nucleus balances it. This leaves less excitation energy for the new compound nucleus, which necessitates fewer neutron ejections to reach a stable state. Due to this energy difference, the former mechanism became known as "hot fusion" and the latter as "cold fusion".

Cold fusion was first declared successful in 1974 at JINR, when it was tested for synthesis of the yet-undiscovered element 106. These new nuclei were projected to decay via spontaneous fission. The physicists at JINR concluded element 106 was produced in the experiment because no fissioning nucleus known at the time showed parameters of fission similar to what was observed during the experiment and because changing either of the two nuclei in the reactions negated the observed effects. Physicists at Lawrence Berkeley National Laboratory, (originally Radiation Laboratory) also expressed great interest in the new technique. When asked about how far this new method could go and if lead targets were a physics' Klondike, Oganessian responded, "Klondike may be an exaggeration [...] But soon, we will try to get elements 107 ... 108 in these reactions."

=== Reports ===
Synthesis of element 108 was first attempted in 1978 by a team led by Oganessian at JINR. The team used a reaction that would generate element 108, specifically, the isotope ^{270}108, (Note: The superscript number to the left of a chemical symbol refers to the mass of the nuclide; for instance, ^{48}Ca is calcium-48. In superheavy element research, elements that have not gotten a name and a symbol, are often called by their atomic number in lieu of symbols; if a symbol has been assigned and the number is to be displayed, it is written in subscript to the left of the symbol. ^{270}108 would be ^{270}Hs or ^{270}_{108}Hs or hassium-270 in modern nomenclature.) from fusion of radium (specifically, the isotope ^{226}_{88}Ra) and calcium (^{48}_{20}Ca). The researchers were uncertain in interpreting their data, and their paper did not unambiguously claim to have discovered the element. The same year, another team at JINR investigated the possibility of synthesis of element 108 in reactions between lead (^{208}_{82}Pb) and iron (^{58}_{26}Fe); they were uncertain in interpreting the data, suggesting the possibility that element 108 had not been created.

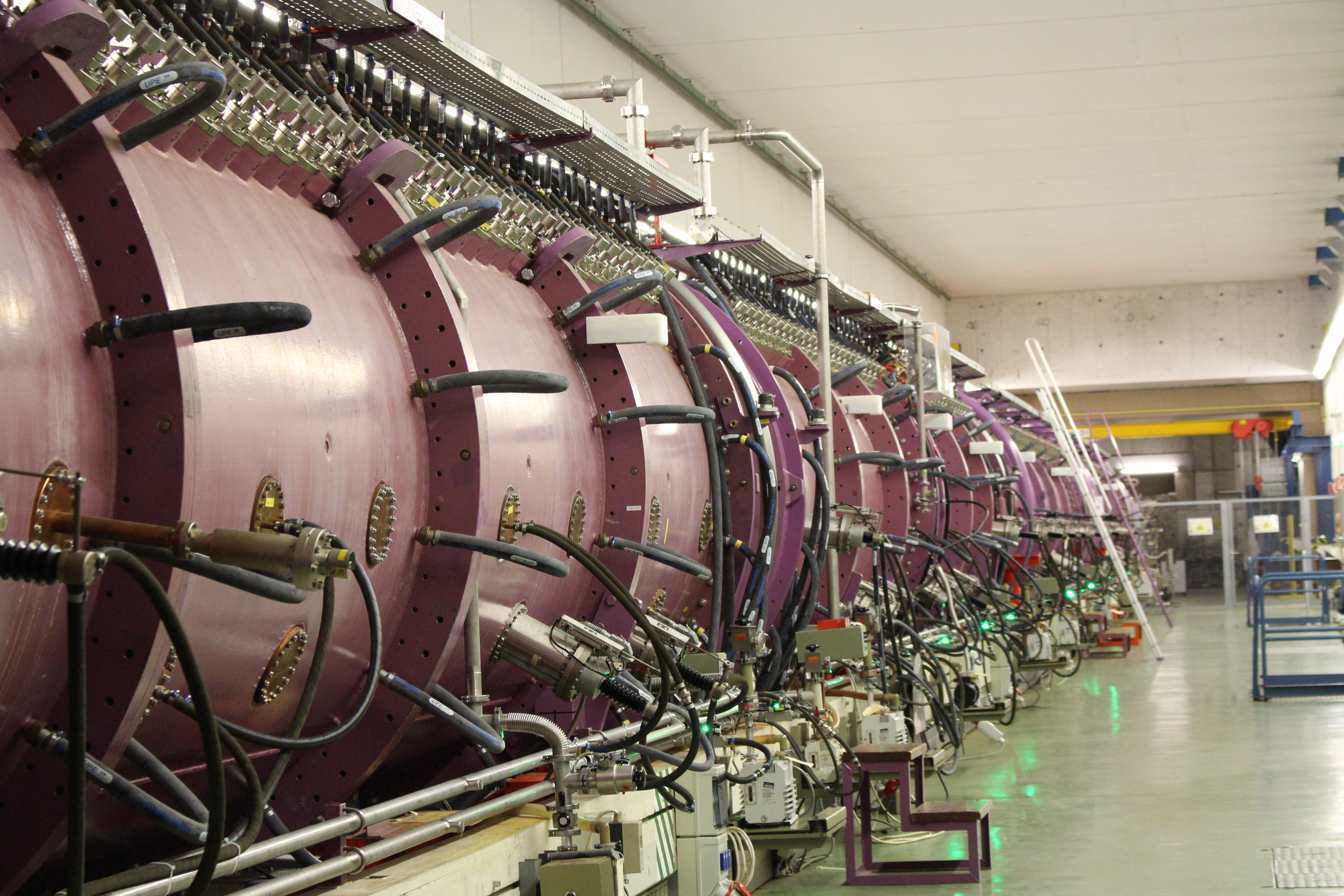
GSI's linear particle accelerator UNILAC, where hassium was discovered and where its chemistry was first observed

In 1983, new experiments were performed at JINR. The experiments probably resulted in the synthesis of element 108; bismuth (^{209}_{83}Bi) was bombarded with manganese (^{55}_{25}Mn) to obtain ^{263}108, lead (^{207, 208}Pb) was bombarded with iron (^{58}Fe) to obtain ^{264}108, and californium (^{249}_{98}Cf) was bombarded with neon (^{22}_{10}Ne) to obtain ^{270}108. These experiments were not claimed as a discovery and Oganessian announced them in a conference rather than in a written report.

In 1984, JINR researchers in Dubna performed experiments set up identically to the previous ones; they bombarded bismuth and lead targets with ions of manganese and iron, respectively. Twenty-one spontaneous fission events were recorded; the researchers concluded they were caused by ^{264}108.

Later in 1984, a research team led by Peter Armbruster and Gottfried Münzenberg at Gesellschaft für Schwerionenforschung (GSI; Institute for Heavy Ion Research) in Darmstadt, Hesse, West Germany, tried to create element 108. The team bombarded a lead (^{208}Pb) target with accelerated iron (^{58}Fe) nuclei. GSI's experiment to create element 108 was delayed until after their creation of element 109 in 1982, as prior calculations had suggested that even–even isotopes of element 108 would have spontaneous fission half-lives of less than one microsecond, making them difficult to detect and identify. The element 108 experiment finally went ahead after ^{266}109 had been synthesized and was found to decay by alpha emission, suggesting that isotopes of element 108 would do likewise, and this was corroborated by an experiment aimed at synthesizing isotopes of element 106. GSI reported synthesis of three atoms of ^{265}108. Two years later, they reported synthesis of one atom of the even–even ^{264}108.

=== Arbitration ===
In 1985, the International Union of Pure and Applied Chemistry (IUPAC) and the International Union of Pure and Applied Physics (IUPAP) formed the Transfermium Working Group (TWG) to assess discoveries and establish final names for elements with atomic numbers greater than 100. The party held meetings with delegates from the three competing institutes; in 1990, they established criteria for recognition of an element and in 1991, they finished the work of assessing discoveries and disbanded. These results were published in 1993.

According to the report, the 1984 works from JINR and GSI simultaneously and independently established synthesis of element 108. Of the two 1984 works, the one from GSI was said to be sufficient as a discovery on its own. The JINR work, which preceded the GSI one, "very probably" displayed synthesis of element 108. However, that was determined in retrospect given the work from Darmstadt; the JINR work focused on chemically identifying remote granddaughters of element 108 isotopes (which could not exclude the possibility that these daughter isotopes had other progenitors), while the GSI work clearly identified the decay path of those element 108 isotopes. The report concluded that the major credit should be awarded to GSI. In written responses to this ruling, both JINR and GSI agreed with its conclusions. In the same response, GSI confirmed that they and JINR were able to resolve all conflicts between them.

=== Naming ===
Historically, a newly discovered element was named by its discoverer. The first regulation came in 1947, when IUPAC decided naming required regulation in case there are conflicting names. (Note: This was intended to resolve not only any future conflicts, but also a number of ones that existed back then: beryllium/glucinium, niobium/columbium, lutecium/cassiopeium, hafnium/celtium, tungsten/wolfram, and protactinium(protoactinium)/brevium.) These matters were to be resolved by the Commission of Inorganic Nomenclature and the Commission of Atomic Weights. They would review the names in case of a conflict and select one; the decision would be based on a number of factors, such as usage, and would not be an indicator of priority of a claim. The two commissions would recommend a name to the IUPAC Council, which would be the final authority. The discoverers held the right to name an element, but their name would be subject to approval by IUPAC. The Commission of Atomic Weights distanced itself from element naming in most cases.

In Mendeleev's nomenclature for unnamed and undiscovered elements, hassium would be called "eka-osmium", as in "the first element below osmium in the periodic table" (from Sanskrit eka meaning "one"). In 1979, IUPAC published recommendations according to which the element was to be called "unniloctium" (symbol "Uno"), a systematic element name as a placeholder until the element was discovered and the discovery then confirmed, and a permanent name was decided. Although these recommendations were widely followed in the chemical community, the competing physicists in the field ignored them. They either called it "element 108", with the symbols E108, (108) or 108, or used the proposed name "hassium".

Coat of arms of the German state of Hesse, after which hassium is named

In 1990, in an attempt to break a deadlock in establishing priority of discovery and naming of several elements, IUPAC reaffirmed in its nomenclature of inorganic chemistry that after existence of an element was established, the discoverers could propose a name. (Also, the Commission of Atomic Weights was excluded from the naming process.) The first publication on criteria for an element discovery, released in 1991, specified the need for recognition by TWG.

Armbruster and his colleagues, the officially recognized German discoverers, held a naming ceremony for the elements 107 through 109, which had all been recognized as discovered by GSI, on 7 September 1992. For element 108, the scientists proposed the name "hassium". It is derived from the Latin name Hassia for the German state of Hesse where the institute is located. This name was proposed to IUPAC in a written response to their ruling on priority of discovery claims of elements, signed 29 September 1992.

The process of naming of element 108 was a part of a larger process of naming a number of elements starting with element 101; three teams—JINR, GSI, and LBL—claimed discovery of several elements and the right to name those elements. Sometimes, these claims clashed; since a discoverer was considered entitled to naming of an element, conflicts over priority of discovery often resulted in conflicts over names of these new elements. These conflicts became known as the Transfermium Wars. Different suggestions to name the whole set of elements from 101 onward and they occasionally assigned names suggested by one team to be used for elements discovered by another. (Note: For example, Armbruster suggested element 107 be named nielsbohrium; JINR used this name for element 105 which they claimed to have discovered. This was meant to honor Oganessian's technique of cold fusion; GSI had asked JINR for permission.) However, not all suggestions were met with equal approval; the teams openly protested naming proposals on several occasions.

In 1994, IUPAC Commission on Nomenclature of Inorganic Chemistry recommended that element 108 be named "hahnium" (Hn) after German physicist Otto Hahn so elements named after Hahn and Lise Meitner (it was recommended element 109 should be named meitnerium, following GSI's suggestion) would be next to each other, honouring their joint discovery of nuclear fission; IUPAC commented that they felt the German suggestion was obscure. GSI protested, saying this proposal contradicted the long-standing convention of giving the discoverer the right to suggest a name; the American Chemical Society supported GSI. The name "hahnium", albeit with the different symbol Ha, had already been proposed and used by the American scientists for element 105, for which they had a discovery dispute with JINR; they thus protested the confusing scrambling of names. Following the uproar, IUPAC formed an ad hoc committee of representatives from the national adhering organizations of the three countries home to the competing institutions; they produced a new set of names in 1995. Element 108 was again named hahnium; this proposal was also retracted. The final compromise was reached in 1996 and published in 1997; element 108 was named hassium (Hs). Simultaneously, the name dubnium (Db; from Dubna, the JINR location) was assigned to element 105, and the name hahnium was not used for any element. (Note: American physicist Glenn T. Seaborg suggested that name for element 110 on behalf of LBNL in November 1997 after IUPAC surveyed the three main collaborations (GSI, JINR/LLNL, and LBNL) on how they thought the element should be named.)

The official justification for this naming, alongside that of darmstadtium for element 110, was that it completed a set of geographic names for the location of the GSI; this set had been initiated by 19th-century names europium and germanium. This set would serve as a response to earlier naming of americium, californium, and berkelium for elements discovered in Berkeley. Armbruster commented on this, "this bad tradition (Note: Similarly, there are names of ruthenium, moscovium, and dubnium for JINR. The only element discovered by RIKEN in Wakō, Saitama Prefecture, Japan, is named nihonium after a Japanese name of Japan.) was established by Berkeley. We wanted to do it for Europe." Later, when commenting on the naming of element 112, Armbruster said, "I did everything to ensure that we do not continue with German scientists and German towns."

== Isotopes ==
List of hassium isotopes
| Isotope | Half-life (Note: Different sources give different values for half-lives; the most recently published values are listed.) (Note: Few nuclei of each hassium isotope have been synthesized, and thus half-lives of these isotopes cannot be determined very precisely. Therefore, a half-life may be given as the most likely value alongside a confidence interval that corresponds to one standard deviation (such an interval based on future experiments, whose result is yet unknown, contains the true value with a probability of ~68.3%): for example, the value of 1.42 s in the isotope table obtained for ^{268}Hs was listed in the source as 1.42 ±1.13 s, and this value is a modification of the value of 0.38^{+1.8}_{−0.17} s.) | | Decay mode | Discovery year | Discovery reaction (Note: The notation ^{208}Pb(^{56}Fe,n)^{263}Hs denotes a nuclear reaction between a nucleus of ^{208}Pb that was bombarded with a nucleus of ^{56}Fe; the two fused, and after a single neutron had been emitted, the remaining nucleus was ^{263}Hs. Another notation for this reaction would be ^{208}Pb + ^{56}Fe → ^{263}Hs + n.) |
| Isotope | Value | ref | Decay mode | Discovery year | Discovery reaction |
|---|---|---|---|---|---|
| ^{263}Hs | 760 μs | | α, SF | 2009 | ^{208}Pb(^{56}Fe,n) |
| ^{264}Hs | 540 μs | | α, SF | 1986 | ^{207}Pb(^{58}Fe,n) |
| ^{265}Hs | 1.96 ms | | α, SF | 1984 | ^{208}Pb(^{58}Fe,n) |
| ^{265m}Hs | 360 μs | | α | 2009 | ^{208}Pb(^{58}Fe,n) |
| ^{266}Hs | 3.02 ms | | α, SF | 2001 | ^{270}Ds(—,α) |
| ^{266m}Hs | 280 ms | | α | 2015 | ^{270m}Ds(—,α) |
| ^{267}Hs | 55 ms | | α | 1995 | ^{238}U(^{34}S,5n) |
| ^{267m}Hs | 990 μs | | α | 2004 | ^{238}U(^{34}S,5n) |
| ^{268}Hs | 1.42 s | | α | 2010 | ^{238}U(^{34}S,4n) |
| ^{269}Hs | 13 s | | α | 1996 | ^{277}Cn(—,2α) |
| ^{269m}Hs | 2.8 s | | α, IT | 2024 | ^{273}Ds(—,α) |
| ^{270}Hs | 7.6 s | | α | 2006 | ^{248}Cm(^{26}Mg,4n) |
| ^{271}Hs | 46 s | | α | 2008 | ^{248}Cm(^{26}Mg,3n) |
| ^{271m}Hs | 7.1 s | | α, IT | 2024 | ^{275}Ds(—,α) |
| ^{272}Hs | 160 ms | | α | 2023 | ^{276}Ds(—,α) |
| ^{273}Hs | 510 ms | | α | 2010 | ^{285}Fl(—,3α) |
| ^{275}Hs | 600 ms | | α | 2004 | ^{287}Fl(—,3α) |
| ^{277}Hs | 12 ms | | α | 2010 | ^{289}Fl(—,3α) |
| ^{277m}Hs | 130 s (Note: Only one event of decay of this isotope has been registered.) | | SF | 2012 | ^{293m}Lv(—,4α) |

Hassium has no stable or naturally occurring isotopes. Several radioisotopes have been synthesized in the lab, either by fusing two atoms or by observing the decay of heavier elements. As of 2019, the quantity of all hassium ever produced was on the order of hundreds of atoms. Thirteen isotopes with mass numbers 263 through 277 (except for 274 and 276) have been reported, six of which—^{265, 266, 267, 269, 271, 277}Hs—have known metastable states, (Note: Metastable nuclides are denoted by the letter "m" immediately the mass number, such as in "hassium-277m" aka ^{277m}Hs.) though that of ^{277}Hs is unconfirmed. Most of these isotopes decay mainly through alpha decay; this is the most common for all isotopes for which comprehensive decay characteristics are available; the only exception is ^{277}Hs, which undergoes spontaneous fission. Lighter isotopes were usually synthesized by direct fusion of two nuclei, whereas heavier isotopes were typically observed as decay products of nuclei with larger atomic numbers.

Atomic nuclei have well-established nuclear shells, which make nuclei more stable. If a nucleus has certain numbers (magic numbers) of protons or neutrons, that complete a nuclear shell, then the nucleus is even more stable against decay. The highest known magic numbers are 82 for protons and 126 for neutrons. This notion is sometimes expanded to include additional numbers between those magic numbers, which also provide some additional stability and indicate closure of "sub-shells". Unlike the better-known lighter nuclei, superheavy nuclei are deformed. Until the 1960s, the liquid drop model was the dominant explanation for nuclear structure. It suggested that the fission barrier would disappear for nuclei with ~280 nucleons. It was thus thought that spontaneous fission would occur nearly instantly before nuclei could form a structure that could stabilize them; it appeared that nuclei with Z ≈ 103 (Note: "Z" means atomic number—number of protons. "N" means neutron number—number of neutrons. "A" means mass number—combined number of neutrons and protons.) were too heavy to exist for a considerable length of time.

The later nuclear shell model suggested that nuclei with ~300 nucleons would form an island of stability where nuclei will be more resistant to spontaneous fission and will mainly undergo alpha decay with longer half-lives, and the next doubly magic nucleus (having magic numbers of both protons and neutrons) is expected to lie in the center of the island of stability near Z = 110–114 and the predicted magic neutron number N = 184. Subsequent discoveries suggested that the predicted island might be further than originally anticipated. They also showed that nuclei intermediate between the long-lived actinides and the predicted island are deformed, and gain additional stability from shell effects, against alpha decay and especially against spontaneous fission. The center of the region on a chart of nuclides that would correspond to this stability for deformed nuclei was determined as ^{270}Hs, with 108 expected to be a magic number for protons for deformed nuclei—nuclei that are far from spherical—and 162 a magic number for neutrons for such nuclei. Experiments on lighter superheavy nuclei, as well as those closer to the expected island, have shown greater than previously anticipated stability against spontaneous fission, showing the importance of shell effects on nuclei.

Theoretical models predict a region of instability for some hassium isotopes to lie around A = 275 and N = 168–170, which is between the predicted neutron shell closures at N = 162 for deformed nuclei and N = 184 for spherical nuclei. Nuclides in this region are predicted to have low fission barrier heights, resulting in short partial half-lives toward spontaneous fission. This prediction is supported by the observed 11-millisecond half-life of ^{277}Hs and the 5-millisecond half-life of the neighbouring isobar ^{277}Mt because the hindrance factors from the odd nucleon were shown to be much lower than otherwise expected. The measured half-lives are even lower than those originally predicted for the even–even ^{276}Hs and ^{278}Ds, which suggests a gap in stability away from the shell closures and perhaps a weakening of the shell closures in this region.

In 1991, Polish physicists Zygmunt Patyk and Adam Sobiczewski predicted that 108 is a proton magic number for deformed nuclei and 162 is a neutron magic number for such nuclei. This means such nuclei are permanently deformed in their ground state but have high, narrow fission barriers to further deformation and hence relatively long spontaneous-fission half-lives. Computational prospects for shell stabilization for ^{270}Hs made it a promising candidate for a deformed doubly magic nucleus. Experimental data is scarce, but the existing data is interpreted by the researchers to support the assignment of N = 162 as a magic number. In particular, this conclusion was drawn from the decay data of ^{269}Hs, ^{270}Hs, and ^{271}Hs. (Note: In particular, the low decay energy for ^{270}Hs matches calculations. The conclusion for ^{269}Hs was made after its decay data was compared to that of ^{273}Ds; the decay of the latter into the former has an energy sufficiently greater than the decay of the former (11.2 MeV and 9.2 MeV, respectively). The great value of the former energy was explained as a right-to-left crossing of N = 162 (^{273}Ds has 163 neutrons and ^{269}Hs has 161). A similar observation and conclusion were made after measurement of decay energy of ^{271}Hs and ^{267}Sg.) In 1997, Polish physicist Robert Smolańczuk calculated that the isotope ^{292}Hs may be the most stable superheavy nucleus against alpha decay and spontaneous fission as a consequence of the predicted N = 184 shell closure.

== Natural occurrence ==
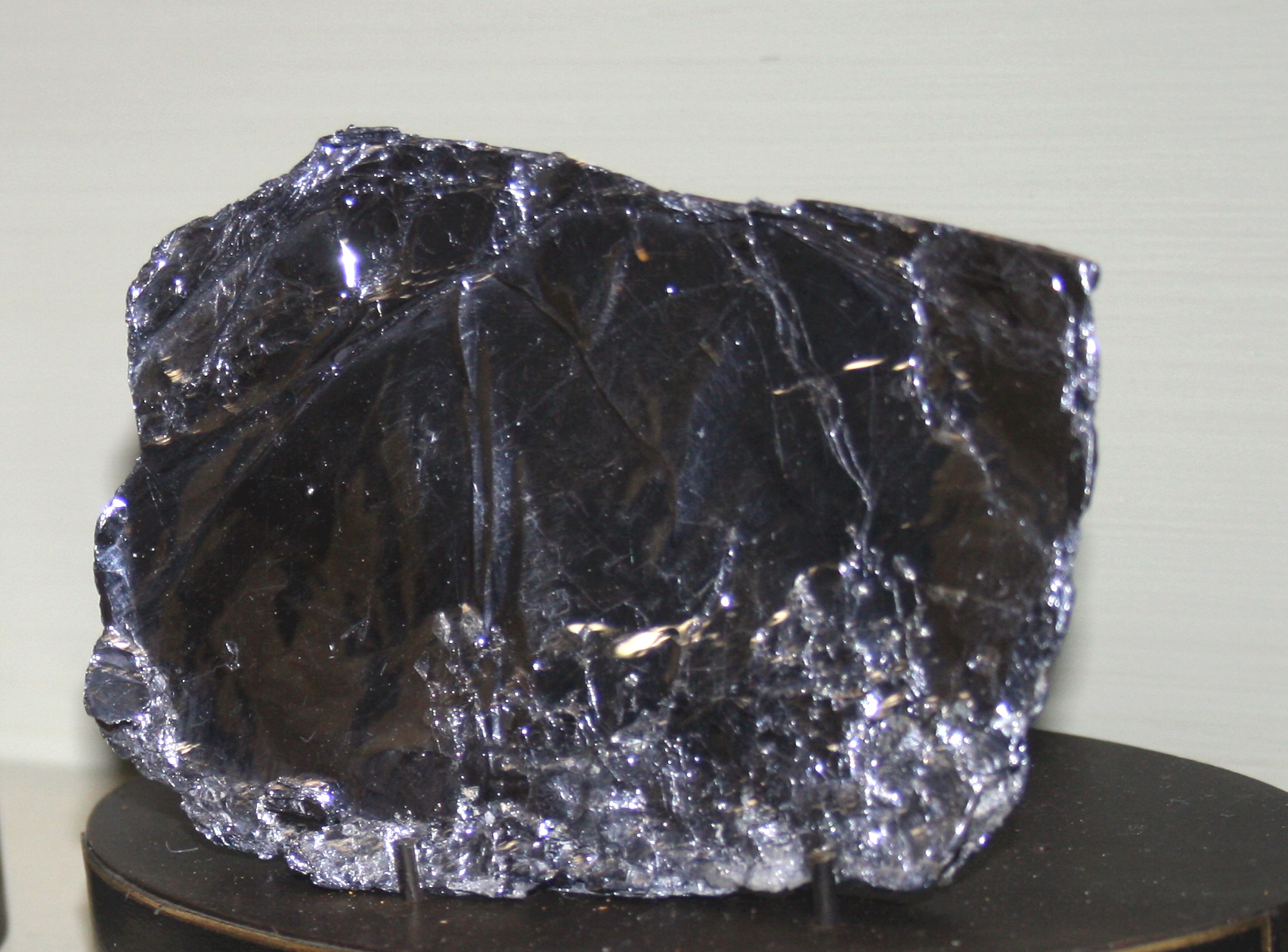
Molybdenite

Hassium is not known to occur naturally on Earth; all its known isotopes are so short-lived that no primordial hassium would survive to today. This does not rule out the possibility of unknown, longer-lived isotopes or nuclear isomers, some of which could still exist in trace quantities if they are long-lived enough. As early as 1914, German physicist Richard Swinne proposed element 108 as a source of X-rays in the Greenland ice sheet. Though Swinne was unable to verify this observation and thus did not claim discovery, he proposed in 1931 the existence of "regions" of long-lived transuranic elements, including one around Z = 108.

In 1963, Soviet geologist and physicist Viktor Cherdyntsev, who had previously claimed the existence of primordial curium-247, claimed to have discovered element 108—specifically the ^{267}108 isotope, which supposedly had a half-life of 400 to 500 million years—in natural molybdenite and suggested the provisional name sergenium (symbol Sg); (Note: At the time, this symbol had not yet been taken by seaborgium.) this name comes from the name for the Silk Road and was explained as "coming from Kazakhstan" for it. His rationale for claiming that sergenium was the heavier homologue to osmium was that minerals supposedly containing sergenium formed volatile oxides when boiled in nitric acid, similarly to osmium.

Soviet physicist Vladimir Kulakov criticized Cherdyntsev's findings on the grounds that some of the properties Cherdyntsev claimed sergenium had, were inconsistent with then-current nuclear physics. The chief questions Kulakov raised were that the claimed alpha decay energy of sergenium was many orders of magnitude lower than expected and the half-life given was eight orders of magnitude shorter than what would be predicted for a nuclide alpha-decaying with the claimed decay energy. At the same time, a corrected half-life in the region of 10^{16} years would be impossible because it would imply the samples contained ~100 milligrams of sergenium. In 2003, it was suggested that the observed alpha decay with energy 4.5 MeV could be due to a low-energy and strongly enhanced transition between different hyperdeformed states of a hassium isotope around ^{271}Hs, thus suggesting that the existence of superheavy elements in nature was at least possible, but unlikely.

In 2006, Russian geologist Alexei Ivanov hypothesized that an isomer of ^{271}Hs might have a half-life of ~(2.5±0.5)×10^{8} years, which would explain the observation of alpha particles with energies of ~4.4 MeV in some samples of molybdenite and osmiridium. This isomer of ^{271}Hs could be produced from the beta decay of ^{271}Bh and ^{271}Sg, which, being homologous to rhenium and molybdenum respectively, should occur in molybdenite along with rhenium and molybdenum if they occurred in nature. Because hassium is homologous to osmium, it should occur along with osmium in osmiridium if it occurs in nature. The decay chains of ^{271}Bh and ^{271}Sg are hypothetical and the predicted half-life of this hypothetical hassium isomer is not long enough for any sufficient quantity to remain on Earth. It is possible that more ^{271}Hs may be deposited on the Earth as the Solar System travels through the spiral arms of the Milky Way; this would explain excesses of plutonium-239 found on the ocean floors of the Pacific Ocean and the Gulf of Finland. However, minerals enriched with ^{271}Hs are predicted to have excesses of its daughters uranium-235 and lead-207; they would also have different proportions of elements that are formed by spontaneous fission, such as krypton, zirconium, and xenon. The natural occurrence of hassium in minerals such as molybdenite and osmiride is theoretically possible, but very unlikely.

In 2004, JINR started a search for natural hassium in the Modane Underground Laboratory in Modane, Auvergne-Rhône-Alpes, France; this was done underground to avoid interference and false positives from cosmic rays. In 2008–09, an experiment run in the laboratory resulted in detection of several registered events of neutron multiplicity (number of emitted free neutrons after a nucleus is hit by a neutron and fissioned) above three in natural osmium, and in 2012–13, these findings were reaffirmed in another experiment run in the laboratory. These results hinted natural hassium could potentially exist in nature in amounts that allow its detection by the means of analytical chemistry, but this conclusion is based on an explicit assumption that there is a long-lived hassium isotope to which the registered events could be attributed.

Since ^{292}Hs may be particularly stable against alpha decay and spontaneous fission, it was considered as a candidate to exist in nature. This nuclide, however, is predicted to be very unstable toward beta decay and any beta-stable isotopes of hassium such as ^{286}Hs would be too unstable in the other decay channels to be observed in nature. A 2012 search for ^{292}Hs in nature along with its homologue osmium at the Maier-Leibnitz Laboratory in Garching, Bavaria, Germany, was unsuccessful, setting an upper limit to its abundance at 3×10^{−15} grams of hassium per gram of osmium.

== Predicted properties ==
Various calculations suggest hassium should be the heaviest group 8 element so far, consistently with the periodic law. Its properties should generally match those expected for a heavier homologue of osmium; as is the case for all transactinides, a few deviations are expected to arise from relativistic effects.

Very few properties of hassium or its compounds have been measured; this is due to its extremely limited and expensive production and the fact that hassium (and its parents) decays very quickly. A few singular chemistry-related properties have been measured, such as enthalpy of adsorption of hassium tetroxide, but properties of hassium metal remain unknown and only predictions are available.

=== Relativistic effects ===
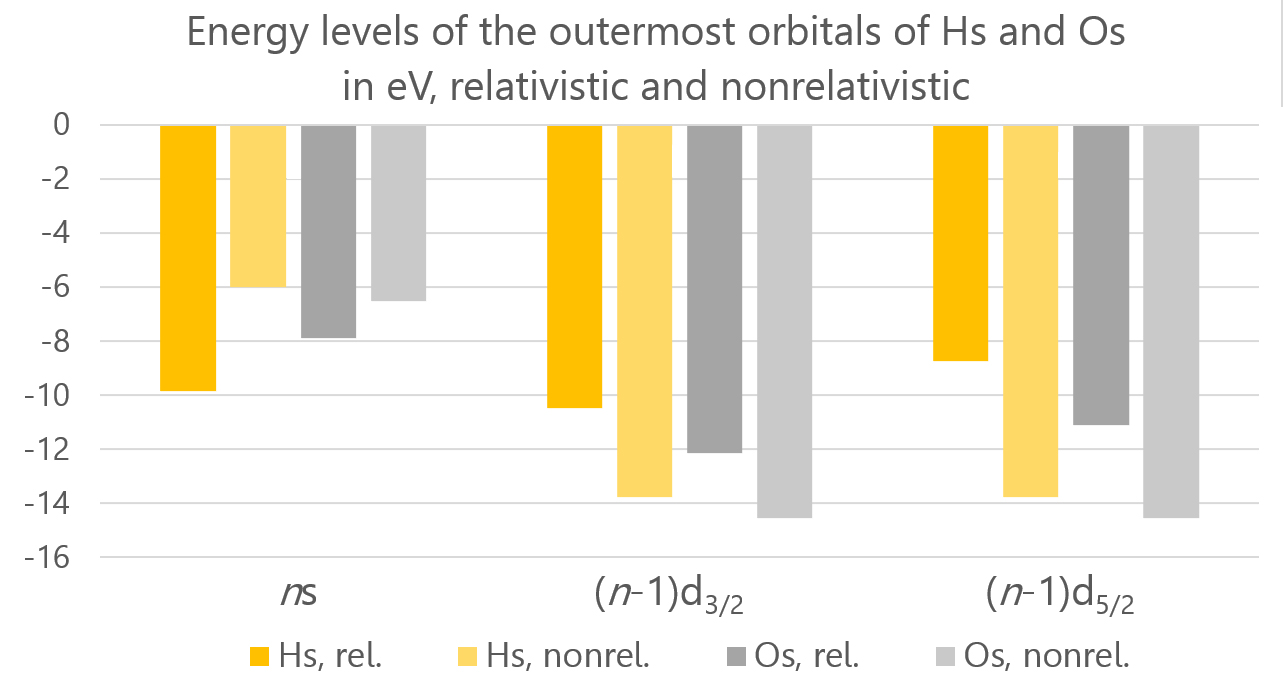
Energy levels of outermost orbitals of hassium and osmium atoms in electronvolts, with and without taking relativistic effects into account. Note the lack of spin–orbit splitting (and thus the lack of distinction between d_{3/2} and d_{5/2} orbitals) in nonrelativistic calculations.

Relativistic effects in hassium should arise due to the high charge of its nuclei, which causes the electrons around the nucleus to move faster—so fast their speed is comparable to the speed of light. There are three main effects: the direct relativistic effect, the indirect relativistic effect, and spin–orbit splitting. (The existing calculations do not account for Breit interactions, but those are negligible, and their omission can only result in an uncertainty of the current calculations of no more than 2%.)

As atomic number increases, so does the electrostatic attraction between an electron and the nucleus. This causes the velocity of the electron to increase, which leads to an increase in its mass. This in turn leads to contraction of the atomic orbitals, most specifically the s and p_{1/2} orbitals. Their electrons become more closely attached to the atom and harder to pull from the nucleus. This is the direct relativistic effect. It was originally thought to be strong only for the innermost electrons, but was later established to significantly influence valence electrons as well.

Since the s and p_{1/2} orbitals are closer to the nucleus, they take a bigger portion of the electric charge of the nucleus on themselves ("shield" it). This leaves less charge for attraction of the remaining electrons, whose orbitals therefore expand, making them easier to pull from the nucleus. This is the indirect relativistic effect. As a result of the combination of the direct and indirect relativistic effects, the Hs^{+} ion, compared to the neutral atom, lacks a 6d electron, rather than a 7s electron. In comparison, Os^{+} lacks a 6s electron compared to the neutral atom. The ionic radius (in oxidation state +8) of hassium is greater than that of osmium because of the relativistic expansion of the 6p_{3/2} orbitals, which are the outermost orbitals for an Hs^{8+} ion (although in practice such highly charged ions would be too polarized in chemical environments to have much reality).

There are several kinds of electron orbitals, denoted s, p, d, and f (g orbitals are expected to start being chemically active among elements after element 120). Each of these corresponds to an azimuthal quantum number l: s to 0, p to 1, d to 2, and f to 3. Every electron also corresponds to a spin quantum number s, which may equal either +1/2 or −1/2. Thus, the total angular momentum quantum number j = l + s is equal to j = l ± 1/2 (except for l = 0, for which for both electrons in each orbital j = 0 + 1/2 = 1/2). Spin of an electron relativistically interacts with its orbit, and this interaction leads to a split of a subshell into two with different energies (the one with j = l − 1/2 is lower in energy and thus these electrons more difficult to extract): for instance, of the six 6p electrons, two become 6p_{1/2} and four become 6p_{3/2}. This is the spin–orbit splitting (also called subshell splitting or jj coupling). (Note: The spin–orbit interaction is the interaction between the magnetic field caused by the spin of an electron and the effective magnetic field caused by the electric field of a nucleus and movement of an electron orbiting it. (According to the special theory of relativity, electric and magnetic fields are both occurrences of common electromagnetic fields that can be seen as more or less electric and more or less magnetic depending on the reference frame. The effective magnetic field from the reference frame of the electron is obtained from the nucleus's electric field after a relativistic transformation from the reference frame of the nucleus.) The splitting occurs because depending on the spin of an electron, it may be either attracted to or repealed by the nucleus; this attraction or repulsion is significantly weaker the electrostatic attraction between them and it can thus only somewhat affect the electron overall.) It is most visible with p electrons, which do not play an important role in the chemistry of hassium, but those for d and f electrons are within the same order of magnitude (quantitatively, spin–orbit splitting in expressed in energy units, such as electronvolts).

These relativistic effects are responsible for the expected increase of the ionization energy, decrease of the electron affinity, and increase of stability of the +8 oxidation state compared to osmium; without them, the trends would be reversed. Relativistic effects decrease the atomization energies of hassium compounds because the spin–orbit splitting of the d orbital lowers binding energy between electrons and the nucleus and because relativistic effects decrease ionic character in bonding.

=== Physical and atomic ===
The previous members of group 8 have high melting points: Fe, 1538°C; Ru, 2334°C; Os, 3033°C. Like them, hassium is predicted to be a solid at room temperature though its melting point has not been precisely calculated. Hassium should crystallize in the hexagonal close-packed structure (^{c}/_{a} = 1.59), similarly to its lighter congener osmium. Pure metallic hassium is calculated to have a bulk modulus (resistance to uniform compression) of 450 GPa, comparable with that of diamond, 442 GPa. Hassium is expected to be one of the densest of the 118 known elements, with a predicted density of 27–29 g/cm^{3} vs. the 22.59 g/cm^{3} measured for osmium.

Hassium's atomic radius is expected to be ≈126 pm. Due to relativistic stabilization of the 7s orbital and destabilization of the 6d orbital, the Hs^{+} ion is predicted to have an electron configuration of [Rn] 5f^{14} 6d^{5} 7s^{2}, giving up a 6d electron instead of a 7s electron, which is the opposite of the behaviour of its lighter homologues. The Hs^{2+} ion is expected to have electron configuration [Rn] 5f^{14} 6d^{5} 7s^{1}, analogous to that calculated for the Os^{2+} ion. In chemical compounds, hassium is calculated to display bonding characteristic for a d-block element, whose bonding will be primarily executed by 6d_{3/2} and 6d_{5/2} orbitals; compared to the elements from the previous periods, 7s, 6p_{1/2}, 6p_{3/2}, and 7p_{1/2} orbitals should be more important.

=== Chemical ===
Stable oxidation states in group 8
| Element | Stable oxidation states | | | | | |
|---|---|---|---|---|---|---|
| iron | | +6 | | | +3 | +2 |
| ruthenium | +8 | +6 | +5 | +4 | +3 | +2 |
| osmium | +8 | +6 | +5 | +4 | +3 | +2 |

Hassium is the sixth member of the 6d series of transition metals and is expected to be much like the platinum group metals. Some of these properties were confirmed by gas-phase chemistry experiments. The group 8 elements portray a wide variety of oxidation states but ruthenium and osmium readily portray their group oxidation state of +8; this state becomes more stable down the group. This oxidation state is extremely rare: among stable elements, only ruthenium, osmium, and xenon are able to attain it in reasonably stable compounds. (Note: While iridium is known to show a +8 state in iridium tetroxide, as well as a unique +9 state in the iridium tetroxide cation IrO_{4}^{+}, the former is known only in matrix isolation and the latter in the gas phase, and no iridium compounds in such high oxidation states have been synthesized in macroscopic amounts.) Hassium is expected to follow its congeners and have a stable +8 state, but like them it should show lower stable oxidation states such as +6, +4, +3, and +2. Hassium(IV) is expected to be more stable than hassium(VIII) in aqueous solution. Hassium should be a rather noble metal. The standard reduction potential for the Hs^{4+}/Hs couple is expected to be 0.4 V.

The group 8 elements show a distinctive oxide chemistry. All the lighter members have known or hypothetical tetroxides, MO_{4}. Their oxidizing power decreases as one descends the group. FeO_{4} is not known due to its extraordinarily large electron affinity—the amount of energy released when an electron is added to a neutral atom or molecule to form a negative ion—which results in the formation of the well-known oxyanion ferrate(VI), FeO_{4}^{2−}. Ruthenium tetroxide, RuO_{4}, which is formed by oxidation of ruthenium(VI) in acid, readily undergoes reduction to ruthenate(VI), RuO_{4}^{2−}. Oxidation of ruthenium metal in air forms the dioxide, RuO_{2}. In contrast, osmium burns to form the stable tetroxide, OsO_{4}, which complexes with the hydroxide ion to form an osmium(VIII) -ate complex, [OsO_{4}(OH)_{2}]^{2−}. Therefore, hassium should behave as a heavier homologue of osmium by forming of a stable, very volatile tetroxide HsO_{4}, which undergoes complexation with hydroxide to form a hassate(VIII), [HsO_{4}(OH)_{2}]^{2−}. Ruthenium tetroxide and osmium tetroxide are both volatile due to their symmetrical tetrahedral molecular geometry and because they are charge-neutral; hassium tetroxide should similarly be a very volatile solid. The trend of the volatilities of the group 8 tetroxides is experimentally known to be RuO_{4} < OsO_{4} > HsO_{4}, which confirms the calculated results. In particular, the calculated enthalpies of adsorption—the energy required for the adhesion of atoms, molecules, or ions from a gas, liquid, or dissolved solid to a surface—of HsO_{4}, −(45.4 ± 1) kJ/mol on quartz, agrees very well with the experimental value of −(46 ± 2) kJ/mol.

== Experimental chemistry ==
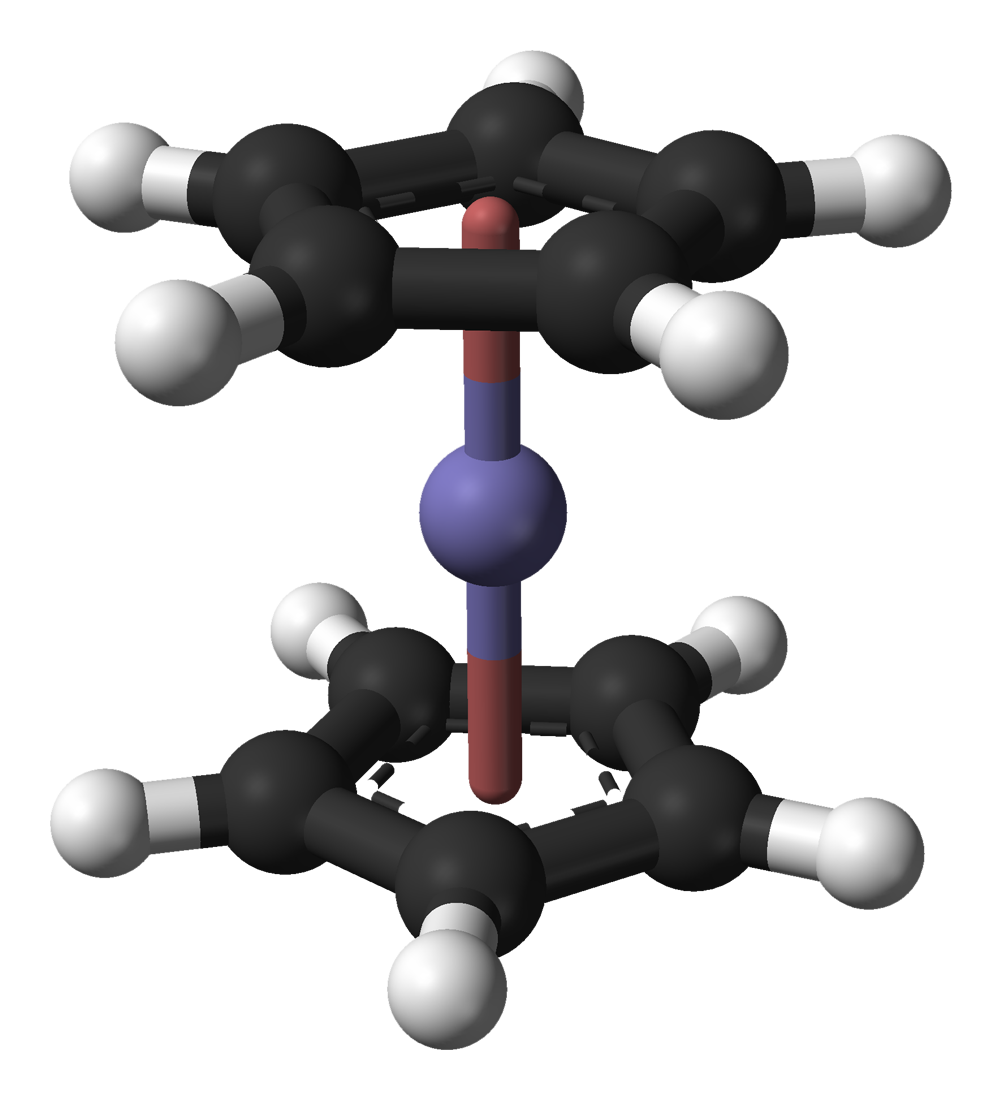
In ferrocene, the cyclopentadienyl rings are in a staggered conformation.

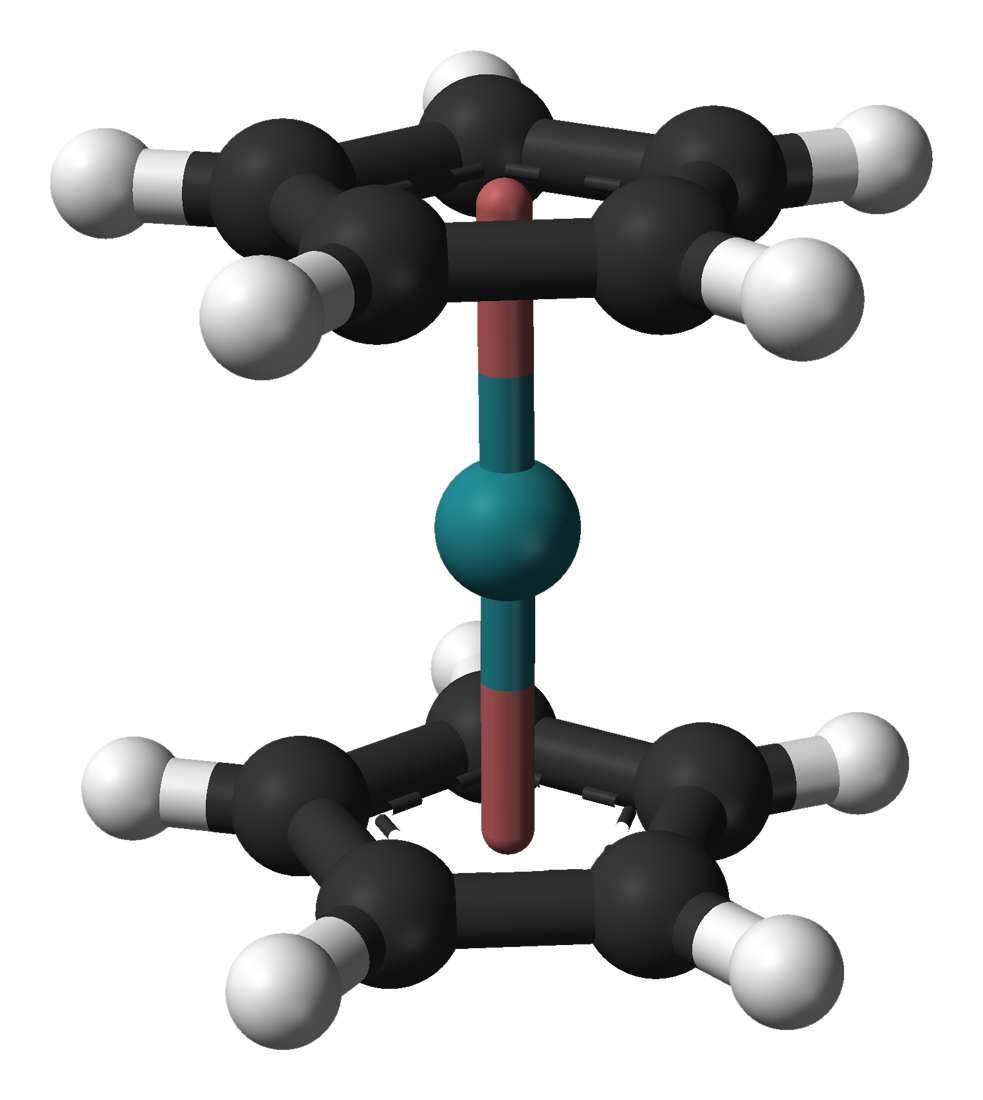
In ruthenocene and osmocene, the cyclopentadienyl rings are in an eclipsed conformation. Hassocene is also predicted to have this structure.

The first goal for chemical investigation was the formation of the tetroxide; it was chosen because ruthenium and osmium form volatile tetroxides, being the only transition metals to display a stable compound in the +8 oxidation state. Despite this selection for gas-phase chemical studies being clear from the beginning, chemical characterization of hassium was considered a difficult task for a long time. Although hassium was first synthesized in 1984, it was not until 1996 that a hassium isotope long-lived enough to allow chemical studies was synthesized. Unfortunately, this isotope, ^{269}Hs, was synthesized indirectly from the decay of ^{277}Cn; not only are indirect synthesis methods not favourable for chemical studies, but the reaction that produced the isotope ^{277}Cn had a low yield—its cross section was only 1 pb—and thus did not provide enough hassium atoms for a chemical investigation. Direct synthesis of ^{269}Hs and ^{270}Hs in the reaction ^{248}Cm(^{26}Mg,xn)^{274−x}Hs (x = 4 or 5) appeared more promising because the cross section for this reaction was somewhat larger at 7 pb. This yield was still around ten times lower than that for the reaction used for the chemical characterization of bohrium. New techniques for irradiation, separation, and detection had to be introduced before hassium could be successfully characterized chemically.

Ruthenium and osmium have very similar chemistry due to the lanthanide contraction but iron shows some differences from them; for example, although ruthenium and osmium form stable tetroxides in which the metal is in the +8 oxidation state, iron does not. In preparation for the chemical characterization of hassium, research focused on ruthenium and osmium rather than iron because hassium was expected to be similar to ruthenium and osmium, as the predicted data on hassium closely matched that of those two.

The first chemistry experiments were performed using gas thermochromatography in 2001, using the synthetic osmium radioisotopes ^{172, 173}Os as a reference. During the experiment, seven hassium atoms were synthesized using the reactions ^{248}Cm(^{26}Mg,5n)^{269}Hs and ^{248}Cm(^{26}Mg,4n)^{270}Hs. They were then thermalized and oxidized in a mixture of helium and oxygen gases to form hassium tetroxide molecules.

Hs + 2 O_{2} → HsO_{4}

The measured deposition temperature of hassium tetroxide was higher than that of osmium tetroxide, which indicated the former was the less volatile one, and this placed hassium firmly in group 8. The enthalpy of adsorption for HsO_{4} measured, −46±2 kJ/mol, was significantly lower than the predicted value, −36.7±1.5 kJ/mol, indicating OsO_{4} is more volatile thanHsO_{4}, contradicting earlier calculations that implied they should have very similar volatilities. For comparison, the value for OsO_{4} is −39±1 kJ/mol. (The calculations that yielded a closer match to the experimental data came after the experiment, in 2008.) It is possible hassium tetroxide interacts differently with silicon nitride than with silicon dioxide, the chemicals used for the detector; further research is required to establish whether there is a difference between such interactions and whether it has influenced the measurements. Such research would include more accurate measurements of the nuclear properties of ^{269}Hs and comparisons with RuO_{4} in addition to OsO_{4}.

In 2004, scientists reacted hassium tetroxide and sodium hydroxide to form sodium hassate(VIII), a reaction that is well known with osmium. This was the first acid-base reaction with a hassium compound, forming sodium hassate(VIII):

HsO_{4} + 2 NaOH → Na_{2}[HsO_{4}(OH)_{2}]

The team from the University of Mainz planned in 2008 to study the electrodeposition of hassium atoms using the new TASCA facility at GSI. Their aim was to use the reaction ^{226}Ra(^{48}Ca,4n)^{270}Hs. Scientists at GSI were hoping to use TASCA to study the synthesis and properties of the hassium(II) compound hassocene, Hs(C_{5}H_{5})_{2}, using the reaction ^{226}Ra(^{48}Ca,xn). This compound is analogous to the lighter compounds ferrocene, ruthenocene, and osmocene, and is expected to have the two cyclopentadienyl rings in an eclipsed conformation like ruthenocene and osmocene and not in a staggered conformation like ferrocene. Hassocene, which is expected to be a stable and highly volatile compound, was chosen because it has hassium in the low formal oxidation state of +2—although the bonding between the metal and the rings is mostly covalent in metallocenes—rather than the high +8 state that had previously been investigated, and relativistic effects were expected to be stronger in the lower oxidation state. The highly symmetrical structure of hassocene and its low number of atoms make relativistic calculations easier. As of 2021, there are no experimental reports of hassocene.

== Bibliography ==
- Audi, G.; Kondev, F. G.; Wang, M.; et al. (2017). "The NUBASE2016 evaluation of nuclear properties" (PDF). Chinese Physics C. 41 (3) 030001. Bibcode:2017ChPhC..41c0001A. doi:10.1088/1674-1137/41/3/030001. S2CID 126750783. Archived from the original (PDF) on 1 August 2020.
- Barber, R. C.; Greenwood, N. N.; Hrynkiewicz, A. Z.; et al. (1993). "Discovery of the Transfermium elements" (PDF). Pure and Applied Chemistry. 65 (8): 1757–1814. doi:10.1351/pac199365081757. S2CID 195819585. Archived (PDF) from the original on 20 September 2016.
- Beiser, A. (2003). Concepts of modern physics (6th ed.). McGraw-Hill. ISBN 978-0-07-244848-1. OCLC 48965418.
- Greenwood, N. N.; Earnshaw, A. (1997). Chemistry of the Elements (2nd ed.). Butterworth-Heinemann. ISBN 978-0-08-037941-8.
- Hoffman, D. C.; Ghiorso, A.; Seaborg, G. T. (2000). The Transuranium People: The Inside Story. World Scientific. ISBN 978-1-78-326244-1.
- Hoffman, D. C.; Lee, D. M.; Pershina, V. (2006). "Transactinides and the future elements". In Morss, L. R.; Edelstein, N. M.; Fuger, J. (eds.). The Chemistry of the Actinide and Transactinide Elements (3rd ed.). Springer Science+Business Media. pp. 1652–1752. ISBN 978-1-4020-3555-5.
- Kragh, H. (2018). From Transuranic to Superheavy Elements: A Story of Dispute and Creation. Springer. ISBN 978-3-319-75813-8.
- Lide, D. R. (2004). Handbook of chemistry and physics (84th ed.). CRC Press. ISBN 978-0-8493-0566-5.
- Zagrebaev, V.; Karpov, A.; Greiner, W. (2013). "Future of superheavy element research: Which nuclei could be synthesized within the next few years?". Journal of Physics: Conference Series. 420 (1) 012001. arXiv:1207.5700. Bibcode:2013JPhCS.420a2001Z. doi:10.1088/1742-6596/420/1/012001. ISSN 1742-6588. S2CID 55434734.
