= Akito Arima =

Japanese politician (1930–2020)

- 有馬 朗人
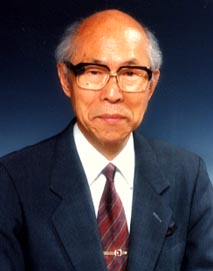
- Official portrait, 1998

Director-General of the Science and Technology Agency
- In office 14 January 1999 – 5 October 1999
- Prime Minister: Keizō Obuchi
- Preceded by: Yutaka Takeyama
- Succeeded by: Hirofumi Nakasone

Chairman of the Japanese Atomic Energy Commission
- In office 14 January 1999 – 5 October 1999
- Prime Minister: Keizō Obuchi
- Preceded by: Yutaka Takeyama
- Succeeded by: Hirofumi Nakasone

Minister of Education
- In office 30 July 1998 – 5 October 1999
- Prime Minister: Keizō Obuchi
- Preceded by: Nobutaka Machimura
- Succeeded by: Hirofumi Nakasone

Member of the House of Councillors
- In office 26 July 1998 – 25 July 2004
- Constituency: National PR

Personal details
- Born: 13 September 1930 Osaka Prefecture, Japan
- Died: 6 December 2020 (aged 90) Setagaya, Tokyo, Japan
- Party: Liberal Democratic
- Education: University of Tokyo
- Scientific career
- Known for: Interacting boson model
- Awards: Nishina Memorial Prize; Humboldt Prize; John Price Wetherill Medal; Order of Merit of the Federal Republic of Germany; Japan Academy Prize; Tom W. Bonner Prize in Nuclear Physics; Legion of Honour; Order of the British Empire (KBE); Person of Cultural Merit; Grand Cordon of the Order of the Rising Sun; Order of Culture
- Fields: Physics
- Workplaces: University of Tokyo; Argonne National Laboratory; Rutgers University; State University of New York at Stony Brook; Hosei University; RIKEN

Akito Arima, KBE (有馬 朗人, Arima Akito; 13 September 1930 – 7 December 2020) was a Japanese nuclear physicist, politician, and haiku poet, known for the interacting boson model.

== Early life and career ==
Arima was born 1930 in Osaka. He studied at the University of Tokyo, where he received his doctorate in 1958. He became a research associate at the Institute for Nuclear Studies in 1956.

Arima became a lecturer in 1960, and an associate professor at the Department of Physics in 1964 at the University of Tokyo. He was promoted to a full professor in 1975. He was president of the University of Tokyo during 1989–1993. In 1993, he moved to Hosei University. Since 1993, he has been scientific adviser of the Ministry of Education and from 1993 to 1998 president of RIKEN.

He was a visiting professor at Rutgers University, New Jersey (1967–1968), and a professor at the State University of New York at Stony Brook (1971–1973). In 1974, he founded the interacting boson model with Francesco Iachello.

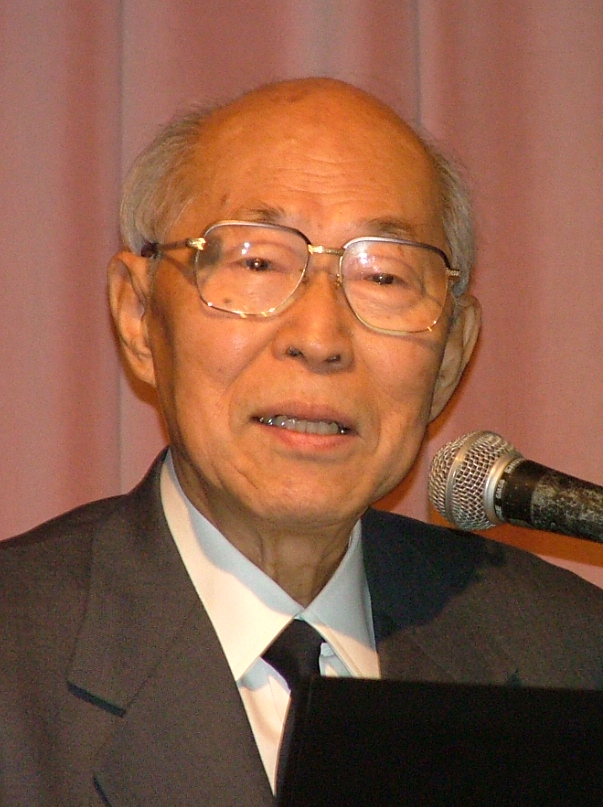
Arima in 2011

In 1998 he entered the Diet of Japan as a member of the House of Councillors for the Liberal Democratic Party. He was Minister of Education until 1999 under the government of Keizo Obuchi. After the cabinet reshuffle in 1999, he served as Director of the Science Museum. From 2000 he was chairman of the Japan Science Foundation.

Arima has served as the Chancellor of Musashi Academy of the Nezu Foundation since 2006.

== Death ==
Arima died from heart failure on December 7, 2020, at the age of 90. He was posthumously promoted to the court rank of Senior Third Rank (shosanmi or ōkimi no tsunokurai), which is usually awarded to high-ranking politicians and prominent scholars in post-war Japan.

== Awards and honors ==
- Nishina Memorial Prize (1978)
- Honorary Professor, the University of Glasgow (1984)
- Humboldt Award (1987)
- Haiku Society Prize for a book of poetry (haiku poems) (1988)
- John Price Wetherill Medal of the Franklin Institute (1990)
- Grand Cross of the Order of Merit of the Federal Republic of Germany (1990)
- Military William Order (1991)
- Honorary Doctor, Drexel University (1992)
- Honorary Professor, the University of Science and Technology, China (1992)
- Honorary Doctor, Chung Yuan Christian University, Taiwan (1992)
- Bonner Prize of the American Physical Society (1993)
- Japan Academy Prize (1993)
- Honorary Doctor, the State University of New York at Stony Brook (1994)
- Honorary Doctor, the University of Groningen (1994)
- Honorary Doctor, the University of Birmingham (1996)
- Grand Officier of the Legion of Honour (1998)
- Foreign Honorary Member of the American Academy of Arts and Sciences (1999)
- Honorary Knight Commander of the Order of the British Empire (KBE) (2002)
- Person of Cultural Merit (2004)
- Grand Cordon of the Order of the Rising Sun (2004)
- Order of Culture (2010)
- Dakotsu Prize (2018)

Academic offices
Preceded by Wataru Mori (pathologist)	President of University of Tokyo; April 1989 – March 1993	Succeeded by Hiroyuki Yoshikawa

Political offices
Preceded by Nobutaka Machimura	Minister of Education; 1998–1999	Succeeded by Hirofumi Nakasone
Preceded by Yutaka Takeyama	Director-General of the Science and Technology Agency; 1999	Succeeded by Hirofumi Nakasone
