= Egbert Kankeleit =

German nuclear physicist (1929–2022)

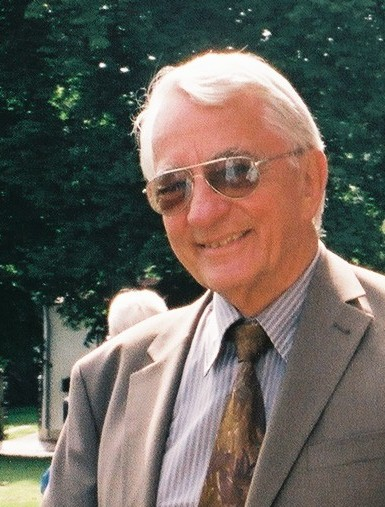
Egbert Kankeleit.

Egbert Kankeleit (16 April 1929 – 23 December 2022) was a German nuclear physicist.

== Early life and education ==
Egbert Kankeleit was born in Hamburg, Germany on 16 April 1929, as the son of Otto Kankeleit and Margarete Kankeleit (née Holl). He studied nuclear physics in Munich and earned his doctorate in 1961 as one of Heinz Maier-Leibniz’s group. After that he went to Caltech in Pasadena in the role of Senior Research Fellow. From there he followed a call to TH Darmstadt, where he remained until his retirement in 1997.

== Studies ==
The Mössbauer spectroscopy had a particular influence on his scientific work. He was the founder of the conversion electron Mössbauer spectroscopy (Konversionselektronen-Mößbauer-Spektroskopie), which he first deployed in the field of nuclear physics (nuclear moments) and later increasingly in the field of materials science (isomeric shifts). The study of muonic atoms at CERN, as well as parity violation during gamma decay and positron research at the Society for Heavy Ion Research (GSI: Gesellschaft für Schwerionenforschung) also belonged to the central aspects of his research.

The miniaturised Mössbauer spectrometer (MIMOS) was developed in Egbert Kankeleit’s team and was successfully deployed during the recent Mars missions.

== Death ==
Kankeleit died in Darmstadt on 23 December 2022, aged 93.

== Teams and awards ==
The interdisciplinary Team of Natural Science, Technology and Security (IANUS) was brought into being by Egbert Kankeleit together with colleagues from other faculties. Based on scientific and technological themes which formed the backbone of the team, IANUS also illuminated ethical questions, such as those concerning the role and responsibility of scientists in the Atomic Age. In the framework of peace and conflict studies, IANUS concerns itself with questions such as the non-proliferation of nuclear materials. The group was awarded the Götting Peace Prize (Göttinger Friedenspreis) in 2000.
