= Johanna Stachel =

German physicist

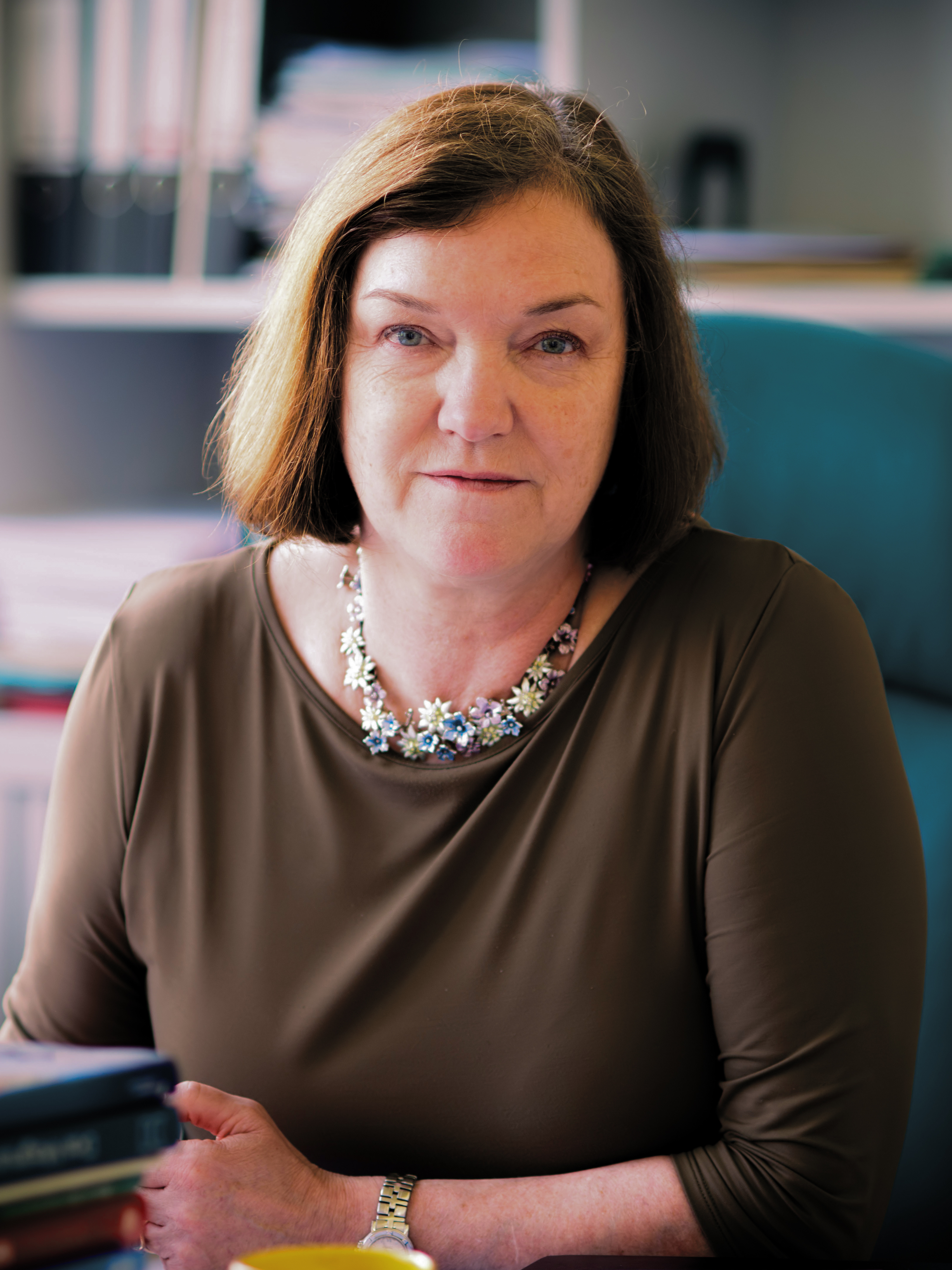
- Stachel in her office at Heidelberg University (2016)
- Born: 3 December 1954 (age 71); Munich, Germany
- Education: Ph.D.
- Alma mater: Johannes Gutenberg University Mainz
- Spouse: Peter Braun-Munzinger
- Awards: Order of Merit (1999)
- Scientific career
- Fields: Physics
- Institutions: Heidelberg University
- Thesis: Die neutronenreichen Rutheniumisotope, ein Übergangsgebiet zwischen sphärischen und asymmetrisch deformierten Kernen (1982)

Johanna Barbara Stachel (born 3 December 1954 in Munich) is a German nuclear physicist. She is a professor in experimental physics at the University of Heidelberg (Ruprecht-Karls-Universität Heidelberg). Stachel is a former president of the German Physical Society (DPG).

== Early life and education ==
Johanna Stachel completed secondary education in 1972 at the Spohn Gymnasium in Ravensburg. She studied physics and chemistry at Johannes Gutenberg University Mainz and the Swiss Federal Institute of Technology (ETH Zürich) and received a degree from the Johannes Gutenberg University Mainz in 1978. In 1982 she obtained a doctorate in physics from the same university.

== Career ==
From 1983 to 1996, Stachel studied and worked at the State University of New York (SUNY) at Stony Brook and Brookhaven National Laboratory where she met her future husband professor Peter Braun-Munzinger. In 1996 she was named professor at the University of Heidelberg. Stachel was spokesperson of the CERN SPS experiment CERES/NA45 and directed the developed the ALICE Transition Radiation Detector.

Stachel was elected President of the German Physical Society for a two-year term starting in 2012. Her two primary priorities as president were first to defend basic research by showing its importance and promote physics education in schools by improving the training of physics teachers and the standards across German schools.

During her career, she has delivered over 150 lectures at international workshops and conferences and has participated in over 100 seminars and colloquia.

== Research interests ==
Stachel's research focuses on understanding relativistic heavy-ion collisions and quark-gluon plasma. She is member of the LHC ALICE Collaboration at CERN in Geneva. Stachel is also interested in developing detectors that are needed to carry out these experiments in particle physics.

== Offices and honorary offices ==
Among her academic responsibilities are:

- From 2003 to 2005 she was dean of the faculty of Physics and Astronomy of the University of Heidelberg. Until 2012, she continued to serve as vice-dean.
- Associate editor for the journal Nuclear Physics A.
- Membership of the Advisory Board of the Wilhelm and Else Heraeus Foundation.
- Membership of the University Council of the Vienna University of Technology starting in 2018 for a 5-year term.
- International councilor with the American Physical Society from 2016–2019.

On 28 March 2014 she received the honorary membership of the Physikalischen Verein, Frankfurt, where she is listed along with Heinrich Hertz, Albert Einstein and Otto Stern.

== Honors and awards ==
- 1986: Sloan Research Fellowship
- 1988: Presidential Young Investigator Award
- 1996: Fellow of the American Physical Society
- 1998: Member of the Berlin-Brandenburg Academy of Sciences and Humanities
- 1999: Order of Merit of the Federal Republic of Germany
- 2001: Lautenschläger Research Prize
- 2012: Member of the Academia Europaea
- 2014: Lise Meitner Prize
- 2014: Full member of the Heidelberg Academy of Sciences and Humanities
- 2015: Member of the Academy of Sciences Leopoldina
- 2017/18: Lise Meitner Lecture in Vienna
- 2019: Stern-Gerlach-Medal
- 2021: Officers Cross of the Order of Merit of the Federal Republic of Germany
