= Francesco Iachello =

Italian nuclear engineer and theoretical physicist

- Born: 11 January 1942 (age 84); Francofonte, Italy
- Citizenship: Italian
- Education: Polytechnic University of Turin; Massachusetts Institute of Technology
- Known for: Interacting boson model Supersymmetry in nuclei Vibron model
- Awards: AKZO Prize (1981); Wigner Medal (1990); Tom W. Bonner Prize (1993); Lise Meitner Prize (2002); Italian National Medal of Science (2007); Majorana Prize (2007); Somaini Volta Prize (2009); Enrico Fermi Prize (2010)
- Scientific career
- Fields: Nuclear physics Molecular physics
- Workplaces: Yale University; University of Groningen; Polytechnic University of Turin

Francesco Iachello (Italian pronunciation: [franˈtʃesko jaˈkɛllo]; born 11 January 1942) is an Italian nuclear engineer and theoretical physicist who works mainly on nuclear and molecular physics. He and his collaborator Akito Arima are the creators of the "interacting boson model".

== Biography ==
Iachello attained a doctorate in 1964 as a nuclear technology engineer at the Polytechnic University of Turin and in 1969 a doctorate in physics at the MIT Center for Theoretical Physics. After a professorship at the University of Groningen in the Netherlands beginning in 1974, he joined Yale University in 1978. He was named J.W. Gibbs Professor in 1991 and professor of physics and chemistry in 1993. He is currently the J. W. Gibbs Professor Emeritus and Research Professor of Physics at Yale.

=== Awards and honours ===
Iachello received the Chiaudano Prize in 1968 as the best Italian engineer of his year and was a Fulbright Fellow in 1964. He was awarded the AKZO Prize of the Netherlands Society of Sciences in 1981, the Wigner Medal in 1990, both the Taormina Prize and the Dutch AKZO Prize in 1991, and in 1993, along with Akito Arima, the Tom W. Bonner Prize of the American Physical Society. In 1997 he received the Centennial Prize of the Italian Physical Society. He received the Eminent Scientist Award from RIKEN in 2000 and the Lise Meitner Prize of the European Physical Society in 2002. Further awards include the Italian National Medal of Science (2007), the Majorana Prize (2007), the Commemorative Medal of Charles University in Prague (2008), the Somaini Volta Prize (2009), and the Enrico Fermi Prize of the Italian Physical Society (2010).

=== Academy memberships ===
Iachello became a foreign member of the Royal Netherlands Academy of Arts and Sciences in 1996. He is a corresponding member of the Croatian Academy of Sciences and Arts (since 1997), and a foreign member of the Mexican Academy of Science, the Italian Galilean Academy, and the Academia Europaea. He is a fellow of the American Physical Society and the American Association for the Advancement of Science, and an honorary fellow of the Hungarian Eötvös Loránd Physical Society, the Hellenic Nuclear Physics Society, and the Italian Physical Society.

=== Honorary degrees and professorships ===
Iachello has been awarded honorary doctorates from the University of Ferrara (1992), Chung Yuan Christian University (1993), the University of Seville (1993), the University of Bucharest (2005), the Hebrew University of Jerusalem (2016), the Technische Universität Darmstadt (2017), and the University of Catania (2018). He holds honorary professorships from Nanjing University, the University of Groningen, and Liaoning Normal University.

== Research ==
Iachello is known for the application of algebraic methods (Lie algebras) to the investigation of the spectra of atomic nuclei and molecules.

=== Interacting boson model ===
In 1974 with Akito Arima he introduced the "Interacting Boson Model" into nuclear physics. This model describes collective nuclear states with the help of the unitary group U(6). The underlying concept is to derive a model with pairs of neutrons and protons instead of unpaired nucleons. The pairs are treated as bosons with different quantum spin (s- and d-bosons, as named according to spin 0 and 2).

=== Supersymmetry in nuclei ===
In 1980, Iachello introduced dynamical supersymmetry in nuclei. In an extension of the interacting boson model, the analogous effect with unpaired fermions has a description using supersymmetrical algebras. This work was further developed with the interacting boson-fermion model, introduced in 1978 and developed with Olaf Scholten at the University of Groningen.

=== Vibron model and molecular physics ===
In 1981, Iachello introduced the vibron model of molecules, developed with Raphael Levine of the Hebrew University of Jerusalem. This model applies algebraic methods based on dynamical symmetry to the classification of molecular rotation-vibration spectra.

=== Quantum phase transitions ===
In more recent work, Iachello introduced the concept of dynamical symmetries at the critical point of phase transitions in nuclei (2000–01). In 2008, with M. A. Caprio and P. Cejnar, he co-introduced the concept of excited state quantum phase transitions (ESQPT) in many-body systems.

=== Double beta decay ===
Iachello has used the interacting boson model to calculate nuclear matrix elements for double beta decay, a process of importance for determining the neutrino mass.

=== Algebraic cluster model ===
Iachello has also investigated the role of discrete symmetries in the cluster structure of light nuclei, developing with R. Bijker an algebraic cluster model with applications to alpha-clustering in nuclei such as ^{16}O.

== Selected works ==
- Iachello, F, ed. (1981). The Interacting Boson Model: Interacting Bose-Fermi Systems in Nuclei. Ettore Majorana International Science Series, volume 10, Proceedings of a seminar, Erice, Italy, June 1980. New York: Plenum Press.
- Iachello, F; Arima, A (2006-11-02). The Interacting Boson Model. Cambridge University Press. ISBN 978-0-521-30282-1. (1st edition 1987)
- Iachello, F; Van Isacker, P (1991). The interacting Boson-Fermion model. ISBN 978-0-521-38092-8.
- Iachello, F; Levine, Raphael D (1995). Algebraic theory of molecules. Oxford University Press. ISBN 978-0-19-508091-9.
- Iachello, F (2006). Lie algebras and applications. Springer. ISBN 978-3-540-36236-4.
- Arima; Iachello "Interacting boson model of collective states", Part 1 (the vibrational limit) Annals of physics Vol. 99, 1976, pp. 253–317, Part 2 (the rotational limit) ibid. Vol. 111, 1978, pp. 201–38, Part 3 with Scholten (the transition from SU(5) to SU(3)), ibid. Vol. 115, 1978, pp. 325–66, Part 4 (the O(6) limit) ibid. Vol. 123, 1979, pp. 468–92
- Arima, Akito (1981). "Interacting boson model". Topics in Nuclear Physics II a Comprehensive Review of Recent Developments. Lecture Notes in Physics. Vol. 145. pp. 858–867. doi:10.1007/BFb0017234. ISBN 3-540-10853-X.
