= Interacting boson model =

The interacting boson model (IBM) is a model in nuclear physics in which nucleons (protons or neutrons) pair up, essentially acting as a single particle with boson properties, with integral spin of either 2 (d-boson) or 0 (s-boson). They correspond to a quintuplet and singlet, i.e. 6 states.

It is sometimes known as the Interacting boson approximation (IBA).

The IBM1/IBM-I model treats both types of nucleons the same and considers only pairs of nucleons coupled to total angular momentum 0 and 2, called respectively, s and d bosons.

The IBM2/IBM-II model treats protons and neutrons separately.

Both models are restricted to nuclei with even numbers of protons and neutrons.

Regions of differently shaped nuclei, as predicted by the Interacting Boson Approximation

The model can be used to predict vibrational and rotational modes of non-spherical nuclei.

== History ==
This model was invented by Akito Arima and Francesco Iachello in 1974. while working at the Kernfysisch Versneller Instituut(KVI) in Groningen, Netherlands. KVI is now property of Universitair Medisch Centrum Groningen (https://umcgresearch.org/).

== See also ==
- Liquid-drop model
- Nuclear shell model
