= Peter Armbruster =

German physicist (1931–2024)

- Born: 25 July 1931; Dachau, Bavaria, Germany
- Died: 26 June 2024 (aged 92); Darmstadt, Hesse, Germany
- Education: Technical University of Stuttgart and Munich
- Occupation: Physicist
- Known for: Discovery of superheavy elements
- Awards: Lise Meitner Prize (2000); Stern–Gerlach Medal (1997); Max Born Medal (1988)

Peter Armbruster (25 July 1931 – 26 June 2024) was a German physicist at the Gesellschaft für Schwerionenforschung (GSI) facility in Darmstadt, Germany, and is credited with co-discovering elements 107 (bohrium), 108 (hassium), 109 (meitnerium), 110 (darmstadtium), 111 (roentgenium), and 112 (copernicium) with research partner Gottfried Münzenberg.

Armbruster studied physics at the Technical University of Stuttgart and Munich, and obtained his Ph.D. in 1961 under Heinz Maier-Leibnitz, Technical University of Munich. His major research fields were fission, interaction of heavy ions in matter and atomic physics with fission product beams at the Research Centre of Jülich (1965 to 1970). He was Senior Scientist at the Gesellschaft für Schwerionenforschung Darmstadt, GSI, from 1971 to 1996. From 1989 to 1992 he was research Director of the European Institut Laue-Langevin (ILL), Grenoble. Since 1996 he has been involved in a project on incineration of nuclear waste by spallation and fission reactions.

He was affiliated as professor with the University of Cologne (1968) and the Darmstadt University of Technology since 1984.

He has received many awards for his work, including the Max Born Medal and Prize awarded by the Institute of Physics and the Deutsche Physikalische Gesellschaft in 1988, and the Stern-Gerlach Medal awarded by the Deutsche Physikalische Gesellschaft in 1997. The American Chemical Society honoured Peter Armbruster (1997) as one of few non-Americans with the 'Nuclear Chemistry Award'.

== Sources ==
Jefferson Lab
