= Darmstadtium =

Darmstadtium, _{110}Ds
Darmstadtium
- Pronunciation: /dɑːrmˈstætiəm/ (darm-STAT-ee-əm); /dɑːrmˈʃtætiəm/ (darm-SHTAT-ee-əm)
- Mass number: [281]

Darmstadtium in the periodic table
Hydrogen																															Helium
Lithium	Beryllium																									Boron	Carbon	Nitrogen	Oxygen	Fluorine	Neon
Sodium	Magnesium																									Aluminium	Silicon	Phosphorus	Sulfur	Chlorine	Argon
Potassium	Calcium															Scandium	Titanium	Vanadium	Chromium	Manganese	Iron	Cobalt	Nickel	Copper	Zinc	Gallium	Germanium	Arsenic	Selenium	Bromine	Krypton
Rubidium	Strontium															Yttrium	Zirconium	Niobium	Molybdenum	Technetium	Ruthenium	Rhodium	Palladium	Silver	Cadmium	Indium	Tin	Antimony	Tellurium	Iodine	Xenon
Caesium	Barium	Lanthanum	Cerium	Praseodymium	Neodymium	Promethium	Samarium	Europium	Gadolinium	Terbium	Dysprosium	Holmium	Erbium	Thulium	Ytterbium	Lutetium	Hafnium	Tantalum	Tungsten	Rhenium	Osmium	Iridium	Platinum	Gold	Mercury (element)	Thallium	Lead	Bismuth	Polonium	Astatine	Radon
Francium	Radium	Actinium	Thorium	Protactinium	Uranium	Neptunium	Plutonium	Americium	Curium	Berkelium	Californium	Einsteinium	Fermium	Mendelevium	Nobelium	Lawrencium	Rutherfordium	Dubnium	Seaborgium	Bohrium	Hassium	Meitnerium	Darmstadtium	Roentgenium	Copernicium	Nihonium	Flerovium	Moscovium	Livermorium	Tennessine	Oganesson
Pt
↑
Ds
↓
—
meitnerium ← darmstadtium → roentgenium
- Atomic number (Z): 110
- Group: group 10
- Period: period 7
- Block: d-block
- Electron configuration: [Rn] 5f^{14} 6d^{8} 7s^{2} (predicted)
- Electrons per shell: 2, 8, 18, 32, 32, 16, 2 (predicted)

Physical properties
- Phase at STP: solid (predicted)
- Density (near r.t.): 26–27 g/cm^{3} (predicted)

Atomic properties
- Oxidation states: common: (none) (+2), (+4), (+6)
- Ionization energies: 1st: 960 kJ/mol; 2nd: 1890 kJ/mol; 3rd: 3030 kJ/mol; (more) (all estimated)
- Atomic radius: empirical: 132 pm (predicted)
- Covalent radius: 128 pm (estimated)

Other properties
- Natural occurrence: synthetic
- Crystal structure: body-centered cubic (bcc) (predicted)
- CAS Number: 54083-77-1

History
- Naming: after Darmstadt, Germany, where it was discovered
- Discovery: Gesellschaft für Schwerionenforschung (1994)

Isotopes of darmstadtium
Main isotopes			Decay	
Isotope	abundance	half-life (t_{1/2})	mode	product
^{279}Ds	synth	0.2 s	α10%	^{275}Hs
^{279}Ds	synth	0.2 s	SF90%	–
^{281}Ds	synth	14 s	SF94%	–
^{281}Ds	synth	14 s	α6%	^{277}Hs

Darmstadtium is a synthetic chemical element; it has symbol Ds and atomic number 110. It is extremely radioactive: the most stable known isotope, darmstadtium-281, has a half-life of approximately 14 seconds. Darmstadtium was first created in November 1994 by the GSI Helmholtz Centre for Heavy Ion Research in Darmstadt, Germany, after which it was named.

In the periodic table, it is a d-block transactinide element. It is a member of the 7th period and is placed in the group 10 elements, although no chemical experiments have yet been carried out to confirm that it behaves as the heavier homologue to platinum in group 10 as the eighth member of the 6d series of transition metals. Darmstadtium is calculated to have similar properties to its lighter homologues, nickel, palladium, and platinum.

== Introduction ==
=== Synthesis of superheavy nuclei ===
A graphic depiction of a nuclear fusion reaction. Two nuclei fuse into one, emitting a neutron. Reactions that created new elements to this moment were similar, though varying numbers of neutrons – or alternatively charged particles – may be emitted instead.

A superheavy (Note: In nuclear physics, an element is called heavy if its atomic number is high; lead (element 82) is one example of such a heavy element. The term "superheavy elements" typically refers to elements with atomic number greater than 103 (although there are other definitions, such as atomic number greater than 100 or 112; sometimes, the term is presented an equivalent to the term "transactinide", which puts an upper limit before the beginning of the hypothetical superactinide series). Terms "heavy isotopes" (of a given element) and "heavy nuclei" mean what could be understood in the common language—isotopes of high mass (for the given element) and nuclei of high mass, respectively.) atomic nucleus is created in a nuclear reaction that combines two other nuclei of unequal size (Note: In 2009, a team at the JINR led by Oganessian published results of their attempt to create hassium in a symmetric ^{136}Xe + ^{136}Xe reaction. They failed to observe a single atom in such a reaction, putting the upper limit on the cross section, the measure of probability of a nuclear reaction, as 2.5 pb. In comparison, the reaction that resulted in hassium discovery, ^{208}Pb + ^{58}Fe, had a cross section of ~20 pb (more specifically, 19^{+19}_{-11} pb), as estimated by the discoverers.) into one; roughly, the more unequal the two nuclei in terms of mass, the greater the possibility that the two react. The material made of the heavier nuclei is made into a target, which is then bombarded by the beam of lighter nuclei. Two nuclei can only fuse into one if they are close enough to each other; normally, nuclei (all positively charged) repel each other due to electrostatic repulsion. The strong interaction can overcome this repulsion but only within a very short distance from a nucleus; beam nuclei are thus greatly accelerated in order to make such repulsion insignificant compared to the velocity of the beam nucleus. The energy applied to the beam nuclei to accelerate them can cause them to reach speeds as high as one-tenth of the speed of light. However, if too much energy is applied, the beam nucleus can fall apart.

Coming close enough alone is not enough for two nuclei to fuse: when two nuclei approach each other, they usually remain together for about 10^{−20} seconds and then part ways (not necessarily in the same composition as before the reaction) rather than form a single nucleus. This happens because during the attempted formation of a single nucleus, electrostatic repulsion tears apart the nucleus that is being formed. Each pair of a target and a beam is characterized by its cross section—the probability that fusion will occur if two nuclei approach one another expressed in terms of the transverse area that the incident particle must hit in order for the fusion to occur. (Note: The amount of energy applied to the beam particle to accelerate it can also influence the value of cross section. For example, in the ^{28}_{14}Si + ^{1}_{0}n → ^{28}_{13}Al + ^{1}_{1}p reaction, cross section changes smoothly from 370 mb at 12.3 MeV to 160 mb at 18.3 MeV, with a broad peak at 13.5 MeV with the maximum value of 380 mb.) This fusion may occur as a result of the quantum effect in which nuclei can tunnel through electrostatic repulsion. If the two nuclei can stay close past that phase, multiple nuclear interactions result in redistribution of energy and an energy equilibrium.

External videos
- Visualization of unsuccessful nuclear fusion, based on calculations from the Australian National University

The resulting merger is an excited state—termed a compound nucleus—and thus it is very unstable. To reach a more stable state, the temporary merger may fission without formation of a more stable nucleus. Alternatively, the compound nucleus may eject a few neutrons, which would carry away the excitation energy; if the latter is not sufficient for a neutron expulsion, the merger would produce a gamma ray. This happens in about 10^{−16} seconds after the initial nuclear collision and results in creation of a more stable nucleus. The definition by the IUPAC/IUPAP Joint Working Party (JWP) states that a chemical element can only be recognized as discovered if a nucleus of it has not decayed within 10^{−14} seconds. This value was chosen as an estimate of how long it takes a nucleus to acquire electrons and thus display its chemical properties. (Note: This figure also marks the generally accepted upper limit for lifetime of a compound nucleus.)

=== Decay and detection ===
The beam passes through the target and reaches the next chamber, the separator; if a new nucleus is produced, it is carried with this beam. In the separator, the newly produced nucleus is separated from other nuclides (that of the original beam and any other reaction products) (Note: This separation is based on that the resulting nuclei move past the target more slowly then the unreacted beam nuclei. The separator contains electric and magnetic fields whose effects on a moving particle cancel out for a specific velocity of a particle. Such separation can also be aided by a time-of-flight measurement and a recoil energy measurement; a combination of the two may allow to estimate the mass of a nucleus.) and transferred to a surface-barrier detector, which stops the nucleus. The exact location of the upcoming impact on the detector is marked; also marked are its energy and the time of the arrival. The transfer takes about 10^{−6} seconds; in order to be detected, the nucleus must survive this long. The nucleus is recorded again once its decay is registered, and the location, the energy, and the time of the decay are measured.

Stability of a nucleus is provided by the strong interaction. However, its range is very short; as nuclei become larger, its influence on the outermost nucleons (protons and neutrons) weakens. At the same time, the nucleus is torn apart by electrostatic repulsion between protons, and its range is not limited. Total binding energy provided by the strong interaction increases linearly with the number of nucleons, whereas electrostatic repulsion increases with the square of the atomic number, i.e. the latter grows faster and becomes increasingly important for heavy and superheavy nuclei. Superheavy nuclei are thus theoretically predicted and have so far been observed to predominantly decay via decay modes that are caused by such repulsion: alpha decay and spontaneous fission. (Note: Not all decay modes are caused by electrostatic repulsion. For example, beta decay is caused by the weak interaction.) Almost all alpha emitters have over 210 nucleons, and the lightest nuclide primarily undergoing spontaneous fission has 238. In both decay modes, nuclei are inhibited from decaying by corresponding energy barriers for each mode, but they can be tunneled through.

Scheme of an apparatus for creation of superheavy elements, based on the Dubna Gas-Filled Recoil Separator set up in the Flerov Laboratory of Nuclear Reactions in JINR. The trajectory within the detector and the beam focusing apparatus changes because of a dipole magnet in the former and quadrupole magnets in the latter.

Alpha particles are commonly produced in radioactive decays because the mass of an alpha particle per nucleon is small enough to leave some energy for the alpha particle to be used as kinetic energy to leave the nucleus. Spontaneous fission is caused by electrostatic repulsion tearing the nucleus apart and produces various nuclei in different instances of identical nuclei fissioning. As the atomic number increases, spontaneous fission rapidly becomes more important: spontaneous fission partial half-lives decrease by 23 orders of magnitude from uranium (element 92) to nobelium (element 102), and by 30 orders of magnitude from thorium (element 90) to fermium (element 100). The earlier liquid drop model thus suggested that spontaneous fission would occur nearly instantly due to disappearance of the fission barrier for nuclei with about 280 nucleons. The later nuclear shell model suggested that nuclei with about 300 nucleons would form an island of stability in which nuclei will be more resistant to spontaneous fission and will primarily undergo alpha decay with longer half-lives. Subsequent discoveries suggested that the predicted island might be further than originally anticipated; they also showed that nuclei intermediate between the long-lived actinides and the predicted island are deformed, and gain additional stability from shell effects. Experiments on lighter superheavy nuclei, as well as those closer to the expected island, have shown greater than previously anticipated stability against spontaneous fission, showing the importance of shell effects on nuclei. (Note: It was already known by the 1960s that ground states of nuclei differed in energy and shape as well as that certain magic numbers of nucleons corresponded to greater stability of a nucleus. However, it was assumed that there was no nuclear structure in superheavy nuclei as they were too deformed to form one.)

Alpha decays are registered by the emitted alpha particles, and the decay products are easy to determine before the actual decay; if such a decay or a series of consecutive decays produces a known nucleus, the original product of a reaction can be easily determined. (Note: Since mass of a nucleus is not measured directly but is rather calculated from that of another nucleus, such measurement is called indirect. Direct measurements are also possible, but for the most part they have remained unavailable for superheavy nuclei. The first direct measurement of mass of a superheavy nucleus was reported in 2018 at LBNL. Mass was determined from the location of a nucleus after the transfer (the location helps determine its trajectory, which is linked to the mass-to-charge ratio of the nucleus, since the transfer was done in presence of a magnet).) (That all decays within a decay chain were indeed related to each other is established by the location of these decays, which must be in the same place.) The known nucleus can be recognized by the specific characteristics of decay it undergoes such as decay energy (or more specifically, the kinetic energy of the emitted particle). (Note: If the decay occurred in a vacuum, then since total momentum of an isolated system before and after the decay must be preserved, the daughter nucleus would also receive a small velocity. The ratio of the two velocities, and accordingly the ratio of the kinetic energies, would thus be inverse to the ratio of the two masses. The decay energy equals the sum of the known kinetic energy of the alpha particle and that of the daughter nucleus (an exact fraction of the former). The calculations hold for an experiment as well, but the difference is that the nucleus does not move after the decay because it is tied to the detector.) Spontaneous fission, however, produces various nuclei as products, so the original nuclide cannot be determined from its daughters. (Note: Spontaneous fission was discovered by Soviet physicist Georgy Flerov, a leading scientist at JINR, and thus it was a "hobbyhorse" for the facility. In contrast, the LBL scientists believed fission information was not sufficient for a claim of synthesis of an element. They believed spontaneous fission had not been studied enough to use it for identification of a new element, since there was a difficulty of establishing that a compound nucleus had only ejected neutrons and not charged particles like protons or alpha particles. They thus preferred to link new isotopes to the already known ones by successive alpha decays.)

The information available to physicists aiming to synthesize a superheavy element is thus the information collected at the detectors: location, energy, and time of arrival of a particle to the detector, and those of its decay. The physicists analyze this data and seek to conclude that it was indeed caused by a new element and could not have been caused by a different nuclide than the one claimed. Often, provided data is insufficient for a conclusion that a new element was definitely created and there is no other explanation for the observed effects; errors in interpreting data have been made. (Note: For instance, element 102 was mistakenly identified in 1957 at the Nobel Institute of Physics in Stockholm, Stockholm County, Sweden. There were no earlier definitive claims of creation of this element, and the element was assigned a name by its Swedish, American, and British discoverers, nobelium. It was later shown that the identification was incorrect. The following year, RL was unable to reproduce the Swedish results and announced instead their synthesis of the element; that claim was also disproved later. JINR insisted that they were the first to create the element and suggested a name of their own for the new element, joliotium; the Soviet name was also not accepted (JINR later referred to the naming of the element 102 as "hasty"). This name was proposed to IUPAC in a written response to their ruling on priority of discovery claims of elements, signed 29 September 1992. The name "nobelium" remained unchanged on account of its widespread usage.)

== History ==
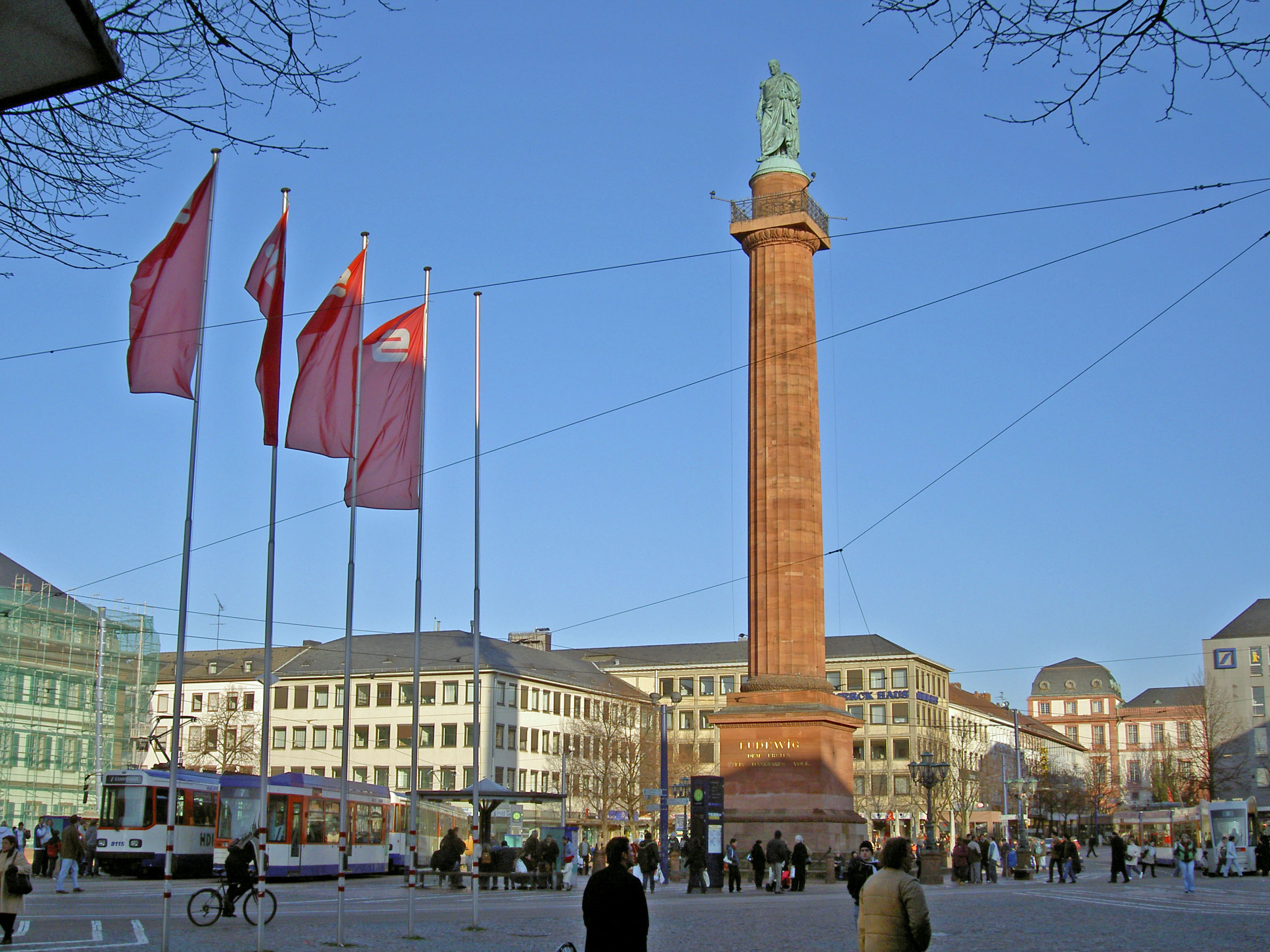
The city center of Darmstadt, the namesake of darmstadtium

=== Discovery ===
Darmstadtium was first discovered on November 9, 1994, at the Institute for Heavy Ion Research (Gesellschaft für Schwerionenforschung, GSI) in Darmstadt, Germany, by Peter Armbruster and Gottfried Münzenberg, under the direction of Sigurd Hofmann. The team bombarded a lead-208 target with accelerated nuclei of nickel-62 in a heavy ion accelerator and detected a single atom of the isotope darmstadtium-269:

^{208}_{82}Pb + ^{62}_{28}Ni → ^{269}_{110}Ds + ^{1}_{0}n

Two more atoms followed on November 12 and 17. (Yet another was originally reported to have been found on November 11, but it turned out to be based on data fabricated by Victor Ninov, and was later retracted.)

In the same series of experiments, the same team also carried out the reaction using heavier nickel-64 ions. During two runs, 9 atoms of ^{271}Ds were convincingly detected by correlation with known daughter decay properties:

^{208}_{82}Pb + ^{64}_{28}Ni → ^{271}_{110}Ds + ^{1}_{0}n

Prior to this, there had been failed synthesis attempts in 1986–87 at the Joint Institute for Nuclear Research in Dubna (then in the Soviet Union) and in 1990 at the GSI. A 1995 attempt at the Lawrence Berkeley National Laboratory resulted in signs suggesting but not pointing conclusively at the discovery of a new isotope ^{267}Ds formed in the bombardment of ^{209}Bi with ^{59}Co, and a similarly inconclusive 1994 attempt at the JINR showed signs of ^{273}Ds being produced from ^{244}Pu and ^{34}S. Each team proposed its own name for element 110: the American team proposed hahnium after Otto Hahn in an attempt to resolve the controversy of naming element 105 (which they had long been suggesting this name for), the Russian team proposed becquerelium after Henri Becquerel, and the German team proposed darmstadtium after Darmstadt, the location of their institute. The IUPAC/IUPAP Joint Working Party (JWP) recognised the GSI team as discoverers in their 2001 report, giving them the right to suggest a name for the element.

=== Naming ===
Using Mendeleev's nomenclature for unnamed and undiscovered elements, darmstadtium should be known as eka-platinum. In 1979, IUPAC published recommendations according to which the element was to be called ununnilium (with the corresponding symbol of Uun), a systematic element name as a placeholder, until the element was discovered (and the discovery then confirmed) and a permanent name was decided on. Although widely used in the chemical community on all levels, from chemistry classrooms to advanced textbooks, the recommendations were mostly ignored among scientists in the field, who called it "element 110", with the symbol of E110, (110) or even simply 110.

In 1996, the Russian team proposed the name becquerelium after Henri Becquerel. The American team in 1997 proposed the name hahnium after Otto Hahn (previously this name had been used for element 105).

The name darmstadtium (Ds) was suggested by the GSI team in honor of the city of Darmstadt, where the element was discovered. The GSI team originally also considered naming the element wixhausium, after the suburb of Darmstadt known as Wixhausen where the element was discovered, but eventually decided on darmstadtium. Policium had also been proposed as a joke due to the emergency telephone number in Germany being 1–1–0. The new name darmstadtium was officially recommended by IUPAC on August 16, 2003.

== Isotopes ==
List of darmstadtium isotopes
Isotope	Half-life (Note: Different sources give different values for half-lives; the most recently published values are listed.)		Decay mode	Discovery year	Discovery reaction
Isotope	Value	ref	Decay mode	Discovery year	Discovery reaction
^{267}Ds (Note: This isotope is unconfirmed)	10 µs		α	1995	^{209}Bi(^{59}Co,n)
^{269}Ds	230 µs		α	1995	^{208}Pb(^{62}Ni,n)
^{270}Ds	205 µs		α	2001	^{207}Pb(^{64}Ni,n)
^{270m}Ds	10 ms		α	2001	^{207}Pb(^{64}Ni,n)
^{271}Ds	90 ms		α	1995	^{208}Pb(^{64}Ni,n)
^{271m}Ds	1.7 ms		α	1998	^{208}Pb(^{64}Ni,n)
^{273}Ds	240 µs		α	1996	^{244}Pu(^{34}S,5n)
^{275}Ds	430 µs		α	2024	^{232}Th(^{48}Ca,5n)
^{276}Ds	150 µs		SF, α	2023	^{232}Th(^{48}Ca,4n)
^{277}Ds	3.5 ms		α	2010	^{285}Fl(—,2α)
^{279}Ds	186 ms		SF, α	2004	^{287}Fl(—,2α)
^{280}Ds	360 µs		SF	2021	^{288}Fl(—,2α)
^{281}Ds	14 s		SF, α	2004	^{289}Fl(—,2α)
^{281m}Ds	900 ms		α	2012	^{293m}Lv(—,3α)

Darmstadtium has no stable or naturally occurring isotopes. Several radioactive isotopes have been synthesized in the laboratory, either by fusing two atoms or by observing the decay of heavier elements. Eleven different isotopes of darmstadtium have been reported with atomic masses 267, 269–271, 273, 275–277, and 279–281, although darmstadtium-267 is unconfirmed. Three darmstadtium isotopes, darmstadtium-270, darmstadtium-271, and darmstadtium-281, have known metastable states, although that of darmstadtium-281 is unconfirmed. Most of these decay predominantly through alpha decay, but some undergo spontaneous fission.

=== Stability and half-lives ===
This chart of decay modes according to the model of the Japan Atomic Energy Agency predicts several superheavy nuclides within the island of stability having total half-lives exceeding one year (circled) and undergoing primarily alpha decay, peaking at ^{294}Ds with an estimated half-life of 300 years.

All darmstadtium isotopes are extremely unstable and radioactive; in general, the heavier isotopes are more stable than the lighter. The most stable known darmstadtium isotope, ^{281}Ds, is also the heaviest known darmstadtium isotope; it has a half-life of 14 seconds. The isotope ^{279}Ds has a half-life of 0.18 seconds, while the unconfirmed ^{281m}Ds has a half-life of 0.9 seconds. The remaining isotopes and metastable states have half-lives between 1 microsecond and 70 milliseconds. Some unknown darmstadtium isotopes may have longer half-lives, however.

Theoretical calculation in a quantum tunneling model reproduces the experimental alpha decay half-life data for the known darmstadtium isotopes. It also predicts that the undiscovered isotope ^{294}Ds, which has a magic number of neutrons (184), would have an alpha decay half-life on the order of 311 years; exactly the same approach predicts a ~350-year alpha half-life for the non-magic ^{293}Ds isotope, however.

== Predicted properties ==
Other than nuclear properties, no properties of darmstadtium or its compounds have been measured; this is due to its extremely limited and expensive production and the fact that darmstadtium (and its parents) decays very quickly. Properties of darmstadtium metal remain unknown and only predictions are available.

=== Chemical ===
Darmstadtium is the eighth member of the 6d series of transition metals, and should be much like the platinum group metals. Calculations on its ionization potentials and atomic and ionic radii are similar to that of its lighter homologue platinum, thus implying that darmstadtium's basic properties will resemble those of the other group 10 elements, nickel, palladium, and platinum.

Prediction of the probable chemical properties of darmstadtium has not received much attention recently. Darmstadtium should be a very noble metal. The predicted standard reduction potential for the Ds^{2+}/Ds couple is 1.7 V. Based on the most stable oxidation states of the lighter group 10 elements, the most stable oxidation states of darmstadtium are predicted to be the +6, +4, and +2 states; however, the neutral state is predicted to be the most stable in aqueous solutions. In comparison, only platinum is known to show the maximum oxidation state in the group, +6, while the most stable state is +2 for both nickel and palladium. It is further expected that the maximum oxidation states of elements from bohrium (element 107) to darmstadtium (element 110) may be stable in the gas phase but not in aqueous solution. Darmstadtium hexafluoride (DsF_{6}) is predicted to have very similar properties to its lighter homologue platinum hexafluoride (PtF_{6}), having very similar electronic structures and ionization potentials. It is also expected to have the same octahedral molecular geometry as PtF_{6}. Other predicted darmstadtium compounds are darmstadtium carbide (DsC) and darmstadtium tetrachloride (DsCl_{4}), both of which are expected to behave like their lighter homologues platinum carbide and platinum tetrachloride. Unlike platinum, which preferentially forms a cyanide complex in its +2 oxidation state, Pt(CN)_{2}, darmstadtium is expected to preferentially remain in its neutral state and form Ds(CN)^{2−}_{2} instead, forming a strong Ds–C bond with some multiple bond character.

=== Physical and atomic ===
Darmstadtium is expected to be a solid under normal conditions and to crystallize in the body-centered cubic structure, unlike its lighter congeners which crystallize in the face-centered cubic structure, because it is expected to have different electron charge densities from them. It should be a very heavy metal with a density of around 26–27 g/cm^{3}. In comparison, the densest known element that has had its density measured, osmium, has a density of only 22.61 g/cm^{3}.

The outer electron configuration of darmstadtium is calculated to be 6d^{8} 7s^{2}, which obeys the Aufbau principle and does not follow platinum's outer electron configuration of 5d^{9} 6s^{1}. This is due to the relativistic stabilization of the 7s^{2} electron pair over the whole seventh period, so that none of the elements from 104 to 112 are expected to have electron configurations violating the Aufbau principle. The atomic radius of darmstadtium is expected to be around 132 pm.

== Experimental chemistry ==
Unambiguous determination of the chemical characteristics of darmstadtium has yet to have been established due to the short half-lives of darmstadtium isotopes and a limited number of likely volatile compounds that could be studied on a very small scale. One of the few darmstadtium compounds that are likely to be sufficiently volatile is darmstadtium hexafluoride (DsF_{6}), as its lighter homologue platinum hexafluoride (PtF_{6}) is volatile above 60 °C and therefore the analogous compound of darmstadtium might also be sufficiently volatile; a volatile octafluoride (DsF_{8}) might also be possible. For chemical studies to be carried out on a transactinide, at least four atoms must be produced, the half-life of the isotope used must be at least 1 second, and the rate of production must be at least one atom per week. Even though the half-life of ^{281}Ds, the most stable confirmed darmstadtium isotope, is 14 seconds, long enough to perform chemical studies, another obstacle is the need to increase the rate of production of darmstadtium isotopes and allow experiments to carry on for weeks or months so that statistically significant results can be obtained. Separation and detection must be carried out continuously to separate out the darmstadtium isotopes and have automated systems experiment on the gas-phase and solution chemistry of darmstadtium, as the yields for heavier elements are predicted to be smaller than those for lighter elements; some of the separation techniques used for bohrium and hassium could be reused. However, the experimental chemistry of darmstadtium has not received as much attention as that of the heavier elements from copernicium to livermorium.

The more neutron-rich darmstadtium isotopes are the most stable and are thus more promising for chemical studies. However, they can only be produced indirectly from the alpha decay of heavier elements, and indirect synthesis methods are not as favourable for chemical studies as direct synthesis methods. The more neutron-rich isotopes ^{276}Ds and ^{277}Ds might be produced directly in the reaction between thorium-232 and calcium-48, but the yield was expected to be low. Following several unsuccessful attempts, ^{276}Ds was produced in this reaction in 2022 and observed to have a half-life less than a millisecond and a low yield, in agreement with predictions. Additionally, ^{277}Ds was successfully synthesized using indirect methods (as a granddaughter of ^{285}Fl) and found to have a short half-life of 3.5 ms, not long enough to perform chemical studies. The only known darmstadtium isotope with a half-life long enough for chemical research is ^{281}Ds, which would have to be produced as the granddaughter of ^{289}Fl.

== See also ==
- Island of stability

== Bibliography ==
- Audi, G.; Kondev, F. G.; Wang, M.; et al. (2017). "The NUBASE2016 evaluation of nuclear properties". Chinese Physics C. 41 (3) 030001. Bibcode:2017ChPhC..41c0001A. doi:10.1088/1674-1137/41/3/030001.
- Beiser, A. (2003). Concepts of modern physics (6th ed.). McGraw-Hill. ISBN 978-0-07-244848-1. OCLC 48965418.
- Hoffman, D. C.; Ghiorso, A.; Seaborg, G. T. (2000). The Transuranium People: The Inside Story. World Scientific. ISBN 978-1-78-326244-1.
- Kragh, H. (2018). From Transuranic to Superheavy Elements: A Story of Dispute and Creation. Springer. ISBN 978-3-319-75813-8.
- Zagrebaev, V.; Karpov, A.; Greiner, W. (2013). "Future of superheavy element research: Which nuclei could be synthesized within the next few years?". Journal of Physics: Conference Series. 420 (1) 012001. arXiv:1207.5700. Bibcode:2013JPhCS.420a2001Z. doi:10.1088/1742-6596/420/1/012001. ISSN 1742-6588. S2CID 55434734.
