= Isotopes of darmstadtium =

Isotopes of darmstadtium (_{110}Ds)
Main isotopes			Decay	
Isotope	abundance	half-life (t_{1/2})	mode	product
^{279}Ds	synth	0.2 s	α10%	^{275}Hs
^{279}Ds	synth	0.2 s	SF90%	–
^{281}Ds	synth	14 s	SF94%	–
^{281}Ds	synth	14 s	α6%	^{277}Hs

Darmstadtium (_{110}Ds) is a synthetic element, and thus a standard atomic weight cannot be given. Like all synthetic elements, it has no stable isotopes. The first isotope to be synthesized was ^{269}Ds in 1994. There are 11 known radioisotopes from ^{267}Ds to ^{281}Ds (with many gaps) and 2 or 3 known isomers. The longest-lived isotope is ^{281}Ds with a half-life of 14 seconds. However, the unconfirmed ^{282}Ds might have an even longer half-life of 67 seconds.

== List of isotopes ==
Nuclide (Note: ^{m}Ds – Excited nuclear isomer.)	Z	N	Isotopic mass (Da) (Note: ( ) – Uncertainty (1σ) is given in concise form in parentheses after the corresponding last digits.) (Note: # – Atomic mass marked #: value and uncertainty derived not from purely experimental data, but at least partly from trends from the Mass Surface (TMS).)	Discovery year	Half-life	Decay mode (Note: Modes of decay: SF: / Spontaneous fission)	Daughter isotope	Spin and parity (Note: ( ) spin value – Indicates spin with weak assignment arguments.) (Note: # – Values marked # are not purely derived from experimental data, but at least partly from trends of neighboring nuclides (TNN).)
Nuclide	Excitation energy			Discovery year	Half-life	Decay mode	Daughter isotope	Spin and parity
^{267}Ds (Note: Discovery of this isotope is unconfirmed)	110	157	267.14373(22)#	1995	2.8+13.0 −1.3 μs [10(8) μs]	α	^{263}Hs	3/2+#
^{269}Ds	110	159	269.14475(3)	1995	170+160 −60 μs [230(110) μs]	α	^{265}Hs	
^{270}Ds	110	160	270.14459(4)	2001	205(48) μs	α	^{266}Hs	0+
^{270m}Ds	1390(60) keV			2001	3.9+1.5 −0.8 ms [4.3(12) ms]	α (70%)	^{266}Hs	10−#
^{270m}Ds	1390(60) keV			2001	3.9+1.5 −0.8 ms [4.3(12) ms]	IT (30%)	^{270}Ds	10−#
^{271}Ds (Note: Order of ground state and isomer is uncertain.)	110	161	271.14595(10)#	1995	144(53) ms	SF (75%)	(various)	
^{271}Ds	110	161	271.14595(10)#	1995	144(53) ms	α (25%)	^{267}Hs	
^{271m}Ds	68(27) keV			1998	1.63+0.44 −0.29 ms [1.7(4) ms]	α	^{267}Hs	
^{272}Ds	110	162	272.146091(456)#	(1989)	200# ms	SF?	(various)	
^{272}Ds	110	162	272.146091(456)#	(1989)	200# ms	α?	^{268}Hs	
^{273}Ds	110	163	273.14846(15)#	1996	190+140 −60 μs [240(100) μs]	α	^{269}Hs	
^{273m}Ds (Note: Discovery of this isomer is unconfirmed)	198(20) keV			2024	120 ms	α	^{269}Hs	
^{275}Ds	110	165	275.15209(37)#	2024	430+290 −120 μs	α	^{271}Hs	3/2#
^{276}Ds	110	166	276.15302(59)#	2023	150+100 −40 μs	SF (57%)	(various)	0+
^{276}Ds	110	166	276.15302(59)#	2023	150+100 −40 μs	α (43%)	^{272}Hs	0+
^{277}Ds (Note: Not directly synthesized, occurs in decay chain of ^{285}Fl)	110	167	277.15576(42)#	2010	4.0+1.8 −1.0 ms	α	^{273}Hs	
^{279}Ds (Note: Not directly synthesized, occurs as decay product of ^{283}Cn)	110	169	279.15998(65)#	2004	186+21 −17 ms	SF (87%)	(various)	
^{279}Ds	110	169	279.15998(65)#	2004	186+21 −17 ms	α (13%)	^{275}Hs	
^{280}Ds (Note: Not directly synthesized, occurs in decay chain of ^{288}Fl)	110	170	280.16138(80)#	2021	360+172 −16 μs	SF	(various)	0+
^{281}Ds (Note: Not directly synthesized, occurs in decay chain of ^{289}Fl)	110	171	281.16455(53)#	2004	14(3) s	SF (90%)	(various)	
^{281}Ds	110	171	281.16455(53)#	2004	14(3) s	α (10%)	^{277}Hs	
^{281m}Ds (Note: Not directly synthesized, occurs in decay chain of ^{293}Lv, unconfirmed)	80(240)# keV			2012	0.25+1.18 −0.11 s [0.9(7) s]	α	^{277}Hs	
^{282}Ds (Note: Not directly synthesized, occurs in decay chain of ^{290}Fl, unconfirmed)	110	172	282.16617(32)#	(2016)	67+320 −30 s [4.2(33) min]	α	^{278}Hs	0+
This table header & footer:

== Isotopes and nuclear properties ==
=== Nucleosynthesis ===
Superheavy elements such as darmstadtium are produced by bombarding lighter elements in particle accelerators that induce fusion reactions. Whereas most of the isotopes of darmstadtium can be synthesized directly this way, some heavier ones have only been observed as decay products of elements with higher atomic numbers.

Depending on the energies involved, the former are separated into "hot" and "cold". In hot fusion reactions, very light, high-energy projectiles are accelerated toward very heavy targets (actinides), giving rise to compound nuclei at high excitation energy (~40–50 MeV) that may either fission or evaporate several (3 to 5) neutrons. In cold fusion reactions, the produced fused nuclei have a relatively low excitation energy (~10–20 MeV), which decreases the probability that these products will undergo fission reactions. As the fused nuclei cool to the ground state, they require emission of only one or two neutrons, and thus, allows for the generation of more neutron-rich products. The latter is a distinct concept from that of where nuclear fusion claimed to be achieved at room temperature conditions (see cold fusion).

The table below contains various combinations of targets and projectiles which could be used to form compound nuclei with Z = 110.

Target	Projectile	CN	Attempt result
^{208}Pb	^{62}Ni	^{270}Ds	Successful reaction
^{207}Pb	^{64}Ni	^{271}Ds	Successful reaction
^{208}Pb	^{64}Ni	^{272}Ds	Successful reaction
^{209}Bi	^{59}Co	^{268}Ds	Successful reaction
^{226}Ra	^{50}Ti	^{276}Ds	Reaction yet to be attempted
^{232}Th	^{44}Ca	^{276}Ds	Failure to date
^{232}Th	^{48}Ca	^{280}Ds	Successful reaction
^{233}U	^{40}Ar	^{273}Ds	Failure to date
^{235}U	^{40}Ar	^{275}Ds	Failure to date
^{238}U	^{40}Ar	^{278}Ds	Successful reaction
^{244}Pu	^{34}S	^{278}Ds	Successful reaction
^{244}Pu	^{36}S	^{280}Ds	Reaction yet to be attempted
^{248}Cm	^{30}Si	^{278}Ds	Reaction yet to be attempted
^{250}Cm	^{30}Si	^{280}Ds	Reaction yet to be attempted

==== Cold fusion ====
Before the first successful synthesis of darmstadtium in 1994 by the GSI team, scientists at GSI also tried to synthesize darmstadtium by bombarding lead-208 with nickel-64 in 1985. No darmstadtium atoms were identified. After an upgrade of their facilities, the team at GSI successfully detected 9 atoms of ^{271}Ds in two runs of their discovery experiment in 1994. This reaction was successfully repeated in 2000 by GSI (4 atoms), in 2000 and 2004 by the Lawrence Berkeley National Laboratory (LBNL) (9 atoms in total) and in 2002 by RIKEN (14 atoms). The GSI team studied the analogous reaction with nickel-62 instead of nickel-64 in 1994 as part of their discovery experiment. Three atoms of ^{269}Ds were detected. A fourth decay chain was measured but was subsequently retracted.

In addition to the official discovery reactions, in October–November 2000, the team at GSI also studied the analogous reaction using a lead-207 target in order to synthesize the new isotope ^{270}Ds. They succeeded in synthesising eight atoms of ^{270}Ds, relating to a ground state isomer, ^{270}Ds, and a high-spin metastable state, ^{270m}Ds.

In 1986, a team at the Joint Institute for Nuclear Research (JINR) in Dubna, Russia, studied the reaction:

^{209}_{83}Bi + ^{59}_{27}Co → ^{267}_{110}Ds + ^{1}_{0}n

They were unable to detect any darmstadtium atoms. In 1995, the team at LBNL reported that they had succeeded in detecting a single atom of ^{267}Ds using this reaction. However, several decays were not measured and further research is required to confirm this discovery.

==== Hot fusion ====
In the late 1980s, the GSI team attempted to synthesize element 110 by bombarding a target consisting of various uranium isotopes—^{233}U, ^{235}U, and ^{238}U—with accelerated argon-40 ions. No atoms were detected; a limiting cross section of 21 pb was reported.

In September 1994, the team at Dubna detected a single atom of ^{273}Ds by bombarding a plutonium-244 target with accelerated sulfur-34 ions.

Experiments were done in 2004 at the Flerov Laboratory of Nuclear Reactions (FLNR) in Dubna studying the fission characteristics of the compound nucleus ^{280}Ds, produced in the reaction:

^{232}_{90}Th + ^{48}_{20}Ca → ^{280}_{110}Ds* → fission

The result revealed how compound nuclei such as this fission predominantly by expelling magic and doubly magic nuclei such as ^{132}Sn (Z = 50, N = 82). No darmstadtium atoms were obtained. A compound nucleus is a loose combination of nucleons that have not arranged themselves into nuclear shells yet. It has no internal structure and is held together only by the collision forces between the target and projectile nuclei. It is estimated that it requires around 10^{−14} s for the nucleons to arrange themselves into nuclear shells, at which point the compound nucleus becomes a nuclide, and this number is used by IUPAC as the minimum half-life a claimed isotope must have in order to be recognized as being discovered.

The ^{232}Th+^{48}Ca reaction was attempted again at the FLNR in 2022; it was predicted that the ^{48}Ca-induced reaction leading to element 110 would have a lower yield than those leading to lighter or heavier elements. Seven atoms of ^{276}Ds were reported, with lifetimes ranging between 9.3 μs and 983.1 μs; four decayed by spontaneous fission and three decayed via a two-alpha sequence to ^{272}Hs and the spontaneously fissioning ^{268}Sg. The maximum reported cross section for the production of ^{276}Ds was about 0.7 pb and a sensitivity limit an order of magnitude lower was reached. This reported cross section is lower than that of all reactions using ^{48}Ca as a projectile, with the exception of ^{249}Cf + ^{48}Ca, and it further supports the existence of magic numbers at Z = 108, N = 162 and Z = 114, N = 184. In 2023, the JINR team repeated this reaction at a higher beam energy and also found ^{275}Ds. They intend to further study the reaction to search for ^{274}Ds. The FLNR also successfully synthesised ^{273}Ds in the ^{238}U+^{40}Ar reaction.

==== As decay product ====
List of darmstadtium isotopes observed by decay
Evaporation residue	Observed darmstadtium isotope
^{277}Cn	^{273}Ds
^{285}Fl, ^{281}Cn	^{277}Ds
^{291}Lv, ^{287}Fl, ^{283}Cn	^{279}Ds
^{288}Fl, ^{284}Cn	^{280}Ds
^{288}Mc, ^{284}Nh, ^{280}Rg ?	^{280}Ds ?
^{293}Lv, ^{289}Fl, ^{285}Cn	^{281}Ds
^{290}Fl, ^{286}Cn ?	^{282}Ds ?

Darmstadtium has been observed as a decay product of copernicium. Copernicium currently has seven known isotopes, five of which have been shown to alpha decay into darmstadtium, with mass numbers 273, 277, and 279–281. To date, all of these bar ^{273}Ds have only been produced by decay of copernicium. Parent copernicium nuclei can be themselves decay products of flerovium or livermorium. Darmstadtium may also have been produced in the electron capture decay of roentgenium nuclei which are themselves daughters of nihonium and moscovium. For example, in 2004, the Dubna team (JINR) identified darmstadtium-281 as a product in the decay of livermorium via an alpha decay sequence:

^{293}_{116}Lv → ^{289}_{114}Fl + ^{4}_{2}He
^{289}_{114}Fl → ^{285}_{112}Cn + ^{4}_{2}He
^{285}_{112}Cn → ^{281}_{110}Ds + ^{4}_{2}He

==== Retracted isotopes ====
^{280}Ds

The first synthesis of element 114 resulted in two atoms assigned to ^{288}Fl, decaying to the ^{280}Ds, which underwent spontaneous fission. The assignment was later changed to ^{289}Fl and the darmstadtium isotope to ^{281}Ds. Hence, ^{280}Ds remained unknown until 2016, when it was populated by the hitherto unknown alpha decay of ^{284}Cn (previously, that nucleus was only known to undergo spontaneous fission). The discovery of ^{280}Ds in this decay chain was confirmed in 2021; it undergoes spontaneous fission with a half-life of 360 μs.

^{277}Ds

In the claimed synthesis of ^{293}Og in 1999, the isotope ^{277}Ds was identified as decaying by 10.18 MeV alpha emission with a half-life of 3.0 ms. This claim was retracted in 2001. This isotope was finally created in 2010 and its decay data supported the fabrication of previous data.

^{273m}Ds

In the synthesis of ^{277}Cn in 1996 by GSI (see copernicium), one decay chain proceeded via ^{273}Ds, which decayed by emission of a 9.73 MeV alpha particle with a lifetime of 170 ms. This would have been assigned to an isomeric level. This data could not be confirmed and thus this isotope is currently unknown or unconfirmed.

^{272}Ds

In the first attempt to synthesize darmstadtium, a 10 ms SF activity was assigned to ^{272}Ds in the reaction ^{232}Th(^{44}Ca,4n). Given current understanding regarding stability, this isotope has been retracted from the table of isotopes.

==== Nuclear isomerism ====
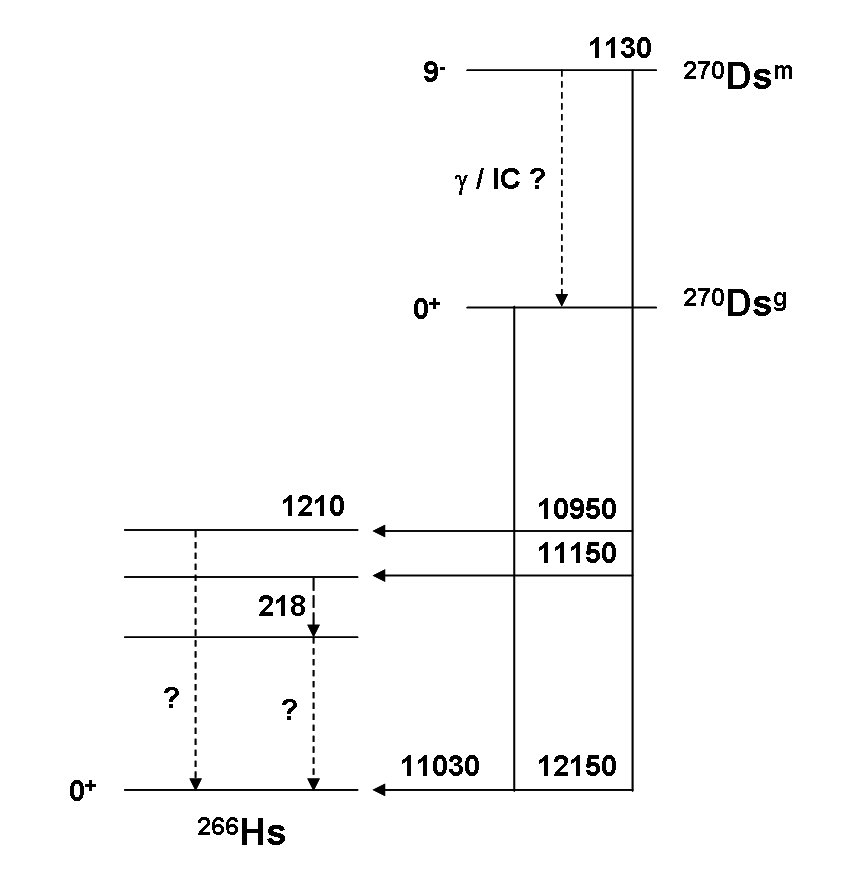
The current partial decay level scheme for ^{270}Ds proposed following the work of Hofmann et al. in 2000 at GSI

^{281}Ds

The production of ^{281}Ds by the decay of ^{289}Fl or ^{293}Lv has produced two very different decay modes. The most common and readily confirmed mode is spontaneous fission with a half-life of 11 s. A much rarer and as yet unconfirmed mode is alpha decay by emission of an alpha particle with energy 8.77 MeV with an observed half-life of around 3.7 min. This decay is associated with a unique decay pathway from the parent nuclides and must be assigned to an isomeric level. The half-life suggests that it must be assigned to an isomeric state but further research is required to confirm these reports. It was suggested in 2016 that this unknown activity might be due to ^{282}Mt, the great-granddaughter of ^{290}Fl via electron capture and two consecutive alpha decays.

^{271}Ds

Decay data from the direct synthesis of ^{271}Ds clearly indicates the presence of two nuclear isomers. The first emits alpha particles with energies 10.74 and 10.69 MeV and has a half-life of 1.63 ms. The other only emits alpha particles with an energy of 10.71 MeV and has a half-life of 69 ms. The first has been assigned to the ground state and the latter to an isomeric level. It has been suggested that the closeness of the alpha decay energies indicates that the isomeric level may decay primarily by delayed isomeric transition to the ground state, resulting in an identical measured alpha energy and a combined half-life for the two processes.

^{270}Ds

The direct production of ^{270}Ds has clearly identified two nuclear isomers. The ground state decays by alpha emission into the ground state of ^{266}Hs by emitting an alpha particle with energy 11.03 MeV and has a half-life of 0.10 ms. The metastable state decays by alpha emission, emitting alpha particles with energies of 12.15, 11.15, and 10.95 MeV, and has a half-life of 6 ms. When the metastable state emits an alpha particle of energy 12.15 MeV, it decays into the ground state of ^{266}Hs, indicating that it has 1.12 MeV of excess energy.

=== Chemical yields of isotopes ===
==== Cold fusion ====
The table below provides cross-sections and excitation energies for cold fusion reactions producing darmstadtium isotopes directly. Data in bold represent maxima derived from excitation function measurements. + represents an observed exit channel.

Projectile	Target	CN	1n	2n	3n
^{62}Ni	^{208}Pb	^{270}Ds	3.5 pb		
^{64}Ni	^{208}Pb	^{272}Ds	**15 pb, 9.9 MeV**		

=== Fission of compound nuclei with Z = 110 ===
Experiments have been performed in 2004 at the Flerov Laboratory of Nuclear Reactions in Dubna studying the fission characteristics of the compound nucleus ^{280}Ds. The nuclear reaction used is ^{232}Th+^{48}Ca. The result revealed how nuclei such as this fission predominantly by expelling closed shell nuclei such as ^{132}Sn (Z = 50, N = 82).

=== Theoretical calculations ===
==== Decay characteristics ====
Theoretical calculation in a quantum tunneling model reproduces the experimental alpha decay half-live data. It also predicts that the isotope ^{294}Ds would have alpha decay half-life of the order of 311 years.

==== Evaporation residue cross sections ====
The below table contains various targets-projectile combinations for which calculations have provided estimates for cross section yields from various neutron evaporation channels. The channel with the highest expected yield is given.

DNS = Di-nuclear system; σ = cross section

Target	Projectile	CN	Channel (product)	σ_{max}	Model	Ref
^{208}Pb	^{64}Ni	^{272}Ds	1n (^{271}Ds)	10 pb	DNS	
^{232}Th	^{48}Ca	^{280}Ds	4n (^{276}Ds)	0.2 pb	DNS	
^{230}Th	^{48}Ca	^{278}Ds	4n (^{274}Ds)	1 pb	DNS	
^{238}U	^{40}Ar	^{278}Ds	4n (^{274}Ds)	2 pb	DNS	
^{244}Pu	^{36}S	^{280}Ds	4n (^{276}Ds)	0.61 pb	DNS	
^{248}Cm	^{30}Si	^{278}Ds	4n (^{274}Ds)	65.32 pb	DNS	
^{250}Cm	^{30}Si	^{280}Ds	4n (^{276}Ds)	3.54 pb	DNS	
