= Copernicium =

Copernicium, _{112}Cn
Copernicium
- Pronunciation: /ˌkoʊpərˈnɪsiəm/ (KOH-pər-NISS-ee-əm)
- Mass number: [285]

Copernicium in the periodic table
Hydrogen																															Helium
Lithium	Beryllium																									Boron	Carbon	Nitrogen	Oxygen	Fluorine	Neon
Sodium	Magnesium																									Aluminium	Silicon	Phosphorus	Sulfur	Chlorine	Argon
Potassium	Calcium															Scandium	Titanium	Vanadium	Chromium	Manganese	Iron	Cobalt	Nickel	Copper	Zinc	Gallium	Germanium	Arsenic	Selenium	Bromine	Krypton
Rubidium	Strontium															Yttrium	Zirconium	Niobium	Molybdenum	Technetium	Ruthenium	Rhodium	Palladium	Silver	Cadmium	Indium	Tin	Antimony	Tellurium	Iodine	Xenon
Caesium	Barium	Lanthanum	Cerium	Praseodymium	Neodymium	Promethium	Samarium	Europium	Gadolinium	Terbium	Dysprosium	Holmium	Erbium	Thulium	Ytterbium	Lutetium	Hafnium	Tantalum	Tungsten	Rhenium	Osmium	Iridium	Platinum	Gold	Mercury (element)	Thallium	Lead	Bismuth	Polonium	Astatine	Radon
Francium	Radium	Actinium	Thorium	Protactinium	Uranium	Neptunium	Plutonium	Americium	Curium	Berkelium	Californium	Einsteinium	Fermium	Mendelevium	Nobelium	Lawrencium	Rutherfordium	Dubnium	Seaborgium	Bohrium	Hassium	Meitnerium	Darmstadtium	Roentgenium	Copernicium	Nihonium	Flerovium	Moscovium	Livermorium	Tennessine	Oganesson
Hg
↑
Cn
↓
—
roentgenium ← copernicium → nihonium
- Atomic number (Z): 112
- Group: group 12
- Period: period 7
- Block: d-block
- Electron configuration: [Rn] 5f^{14} 6d^{10} 7s^{2} (predicted)
- Electrons per shell: 2, 8, 18, 32, 32, 18, 2 (predicted)

Physical properties
- Phase at STP: liquid (predicted)
- Melting point: 283 ± 11 K (10 ± 11 °C, 50 ± 20 °F) (predicted)
- Boiling point: 340 ± 10 K (67 ± 10 °C, 153 ± 18 °F) (predicted)
- Density (near r.t.): 14.0 g/cm^{3} (predicted)
- Triple point: 283 K, 25 kPa (predicted)

Atomic properties
- Oxidation states: common: (none) +2 (+2), (+4)
- Ionization energies: 1st: 1155 kJ/mol; 2nd: 2170 kJ/mol; 3rd: 3160 kJ/mol; (more) (all estimated)
- Atomic radius: calculated: 147 pm (predicted)
- Covalent radius: 122 pm (predicted)

Other properties
- Natural occurrence: synthetic
- Crystal structure: hexagonal close-packed (hcp) (predicted)
- CAS Number: 54084-26-3

History
- Naming: after Nicolaus Copernicus
- Discovery: Gesellschaft für Schwerionenforschung (1996)

Isotopes of copernicium
Main isotopes			Decay	
Isotope	abundance	half-life (t_{1/2})	mode	product
^{283}Cn	synth	3.81 s	α96%	^{279}Ds
^{283}Cn	synth	3.81 s	SF4%	–
^{283}Cn	synth	3.81 s	ε?	^{283}Rg
^{285}Cn	synth	28 s	α	^{281}Ds
^{286}Cn	synth	8.4 s?	SF	–

Copernicium is a synthetic chemical element; it has symbol Cn and atomic number 112. Its known isotopes are extremely radioactive, and have only been created in a laboratory. The most stable known isotope, copernicium-285, has a half-life of approximately 30 seconds. Copernicium was first created in February 1996 by the GSI Helmholtz Centre for Heavy Ion Research near Darmstadt, Germany. It was named after the astronomer Nicolaus Copernicus on his 537th anniversary.

In the periodic table of the elements, copernicium is a d-block transactinide element and a group 12 element. During reactions with gold, it has been shown to be an extremely volatile element, so much so that it is possibly a gas or a volatile liquid at standard temperature and pressure.

Copernicium is calculated to have several properties that differ from its lighter homologues in group 12, zinc, cadmium and mercury; due to relativistic effects, it may give up its 6d electrons instead of its 7s ones, and it may have more similarities to the noble gases such as radon rather than its group 12 homologues. Calculations indicate that copernicium may show the oxidation state +4, while mercury shows it in only one compound of disputed existence and zinc and cadmium do not show it at all. It has also been predicted to be more difficult to oxidize copernicium from its neutral state than the other group 12 elements. Predictions vary on whether solid copernicium would be a metal, semiconductor, or insulator. Copernicium is one of the heaviest elements whose chemical properties have been experimentally investigated.

== Introduction ==
=== Synthesis of superheavy nuclei ===
A graphic depiction of a nuclear fusion reaction. Two nuclei fuse into one, emitting a neutron. Reactions that created new elements to this moment were similar, though varying numbers of neutrons – or alternatively charged particles – may be emitted instead.

A superheavy (Note: In nuclear physics, an element is called heavy if its atomic number is high; lead (element 82) is one example of such a heavy element. The term "superheavy elements" typically refers to elements with atomic number greater than 103 (although there are other definitions, such as atomic number greater than 100 or 112; sometimes, the term is presented an equivalent to the term "transactinide", which puts an upper limit before the beginning of the hypothetical superactinide series). Terms "heavy isotopes" (of a given element) and "heavy nuclei" mean what could be understood in the common language—isotopes of high mass (for the given element) and nuclei of high mass, respectively.) atomic nucleus is created in a nuclear reaction that combines two other nuclei of unequal size (Note: In 2009, a team at the JINR led by Oganessian published results of their attempt to create hassium in a symmetric ^{136}Xe + ^{136}Xe reaction. They failed to observe a single atom in such a reaction, putting the upper limit on the cross section, the measure of probability of a nuclear reaction, as 2.5 pb. In comparison, the reaction that resulted in hassium discovery, ^{208}Pb + ^{58}Fe, had a cross section of ~20 pb (more specifically, 19^{+19}_{-11} pb), as estimated by the discoverers.) into one; roughly, the more unequal the two nuclei in terms of mass, the greater the possibility that the two react. The material made of the heavier nuclei is made into a target, which is then bombarded by the beam of lighter nuclei. Two nuclei can only fuse into one if they are close enough to each other; normally, nuclei (all positively charged) repel each other due to electrostatic repulsion. The strong interaction can overcome this repulsion but only within a very short distance from a nucleus; beam nuclei are thus greatly accelerated in order to make such repulsion insignificant compared to the velocity of the beam nucleus. The energy applied to the beam nuclei to accelerate them can cause them to reach speeds as high as one-tenth of the speed of light. However, if too much energy is applied, the beam nucleus can fall apart.

Coming close enough alone is not enough for two nuclei to fuse: when two nuclei approach each other, they usually remain together for about 10^{−20} seconds and then part ways (not necessarily in the same composition as before the reaction) rather than form a single nucleus. This happens because during the attempted formation of a single nucleus, electrostatic repulsion tears apart the nucleus that is being formed. Each pair of a target and a beam is characterized by its cross section—the probability that fusion will occur if two nuclei approach one another expressed in terms of the transverse area that the incident particle must hit in order for the fusion to occur. (Note: The amount of energy applied to the beam particle to accelerate it can also influence the value of cross section. For example, in the ^{28}_{14}Si + ^{1}_{0}n → ^{28}_{13}Al + ^{1}_{1}p reaction, cross section changes smoothly from 370 mb at 12.3 MeV to 160 mb at 18.3 MeV, with a broad peak at 13.5 MeV with the maximum value of 380 mb.) This fusion may occur as a result of the quantum effect in which nuclei can tunnel through electrostatic repulsion. If the two nuclei can stay close past that phase, multiple nuclear interactions result in redistribution of energy and an energy equilibrium.

External videos
- Visualization of unsuccessful nuclear fusion, based on calculations from the Australian National University

The resulting merger is an excited state—termed a compound nucleus—and thus it is very unstable. To reach a more stable state, the temporary merger may fission without formation of a more stable nucleus. Alternatively, the compound nucleus may eject a few neutrons, which would carry away the excitation energy; if the latter is not sufficient for a neutron expulsion, the merger would produce a gamma ray. This happens in about 10^{−16} seconds after the initial nuclear collision and results in creation of a more stable nucleus. The definition by the IUPAC/IUPAP Joint Working Party (JWP) states that a chemical element can only be recognized as discovered if a nucleus of it exists for at least 10^{−14} seconds. This value was chosen as an estimate of how long it takes a nucleus to acquire electrons and thus display its chemical properties. (Note: This figure also marks the generally accepted upper limit for lifetime of a compound nucleus.)

=== Decay and detection ===
The beam passes through the target and reaches the next chamber, the separator; if a new nucleus is produced, it is carried with this beam. In the separator, the newly produced nucleus is separated from other nuclides (that of the original beam and any other reaction products) (Note: This separation is based on that the resulting nuclei move past the target more slowly then the unreacted beam nuclei. The separator contains electric and magnetic fields whose effects on a moving particle cancel out for a specific velocity of a particle. Such separation can also be aided by a time-of-flight measurement and a recoil energy measurement; a combination of the two may allow to estimate the mass of a nucleus.) and transferred to a surface-barrier detector, which stops the nucleus. The exact location of the upcoming impact on the detector is marked; also marked are its energy and the time of the arrival. The transfer takes about 10^{−6} seconds; in order to be detected, the nucleus must survive this long. The nucleus is recorded again once its decay is registered, and the location, the energy, and the time of the decay are measured.

Stability of a nucleus is provided by the strong interaction. However, its range is very short; as nuclei become larger, its influence on the outermost nucleons (protons and neutrons) weakens. At the same time, the nucleus is torn apart by electrostatic repulsion between protons, and its range is not limited. Total binding energy provided by the strong interaction increases linearly with the number of nucleons, whereas electrostatic repulsion increases with the square of the atomic number, i.e. the latter grows faster and becomes increasingly important for heavy and superheavy nuclei. Superheavy nuclei are thus theoretically predicted and have so far been observed to predominantly decay via decay modes that are caused by such repulsion: alpha decay and spontaneous fission. (Note: Not all decay modes are caused by electrostatic repulsion. For example, beta decay is caused by the weak interaction.) Almost all alpha emitters have over 210 nucleons, and the lightest nuclide primarily undergoing spontaneous fission has 238. In both decay modes, nuclei are inhibited from decaying by corresponding energy barriers for each mode, but they can be tunneled through.

Scheme of an apparatus for creation of superheavy elements, based on the Dubna Gas-Filled Recoil Separator set up in the Flerov Laboratory of Nuclear Reactions in JINR. The trajectory within the detector and the beam focusing apparatus changes because of a dipole magnet in the former and quadrupole magnets in the latter.

Alpha particles are commonly produced in radioactive decays because the mass of an alpha particle per nucleon is small enough to leave some energy for the alpha particle to be used as kinetic energy to leave the nucleus. Spontaneous fission is caused by electrostatic repulsion tearing the nucleus apart and produces various nuclei in different instances of identical nuclei fissioning. As the atomic number increases, spontaneous fission rapidly becomes more important: spontaneous fission partial half-lives decrease by 23 orders of magnitude from uranium (element 92) to nobelium (element 102), and by 30 orders of magnitude from thorium (element 90) to fermium (element 100). The earlier liquid drop model thus suggested that spontaneous fission would occur nearly instantly due to disappearance of the fission barrier for nuclei with about 280 nucleons. The later nuclear shell model suggested that nuclei with about 300 nucleons would form an island of stability in which nuclei will be more resistant to spontaneous fission and will primarily undergo alpha decay with longer half-lives. Subsequent discoveries suggested that the predicted island might be further than originally anticipated; they also showed that nuclei intermediate between the long-lived actinides and the predicted island are deformed, and gain additional stability from shell effects. Experiments on lighter superheavy nuclei, as well as those closer to the expected island, have shown greater than previously anticipated stability against spontaneous fission, showing the importance of shell effects on nuclei. (Note: It was already known by the 1960s that ground states of nuclei differed in energy and shape as well as that certain magic numbers of nucleons corresponded to greater stability of a nucleus. However, it was assumed that there was no nuclear structure in superheavy nuclei as they were too deformed to form one.)

Alpha decays are registered by the emitted alpha particles, and the decay products are easy to determine before the actual decay; if such a decay or a series of consecutive decays produces a known nucleus, the original product of a reaction can be easily determined. (Note: Since mass of a nucleus is not measured directly but is rather calculated from that of another nucleus, such measurement is called indirect. Direct measurements are also possible, but for the most part they have remained unavailable for superheavy nuclei. The first direct measurement of mass of a superheavy nucleus was reported in 2018 at LBNL. Mass was determined from the location of a nucleus after the transfer (the location helps determine its trajectory, which is linked to the mass-to-charge ratio of the nucleus, since the transfer was done in presence of a magnet).) (That all decays within a decay chain were indeed related to each other is established by the location of these decays, which must be in the same place.) The known nucleus can be recognized by the specific characteristics of decay it undergoes such as decay energy (or more specifically, the kinetic energy of the emitted particle). (Note: If the decay occurred in a vacuum, then since total momentum of an isolated system before and after the decay must be preserved, the daughter nucleus would also receive a small velocity. The ratio of the two velocities, and accordingly the ratio of the kinetic energies, would thus be inverse to the ratio of the two masses. The decay energy equals the sum of the known kinetic energy of the alpha particle and that of the daughter nucleus (an exact fraction of the former). The calculations hold for an experiment as well, but the difference is that the nucleus does not move after the decay because it is tied to the detector.) Spontaneous fission, however, produces various nuclei as products, so the original nuclide cannot be determined from its daughters. (Note: Spontaneous fission was discovered by Soviet physicist Georgy Flerov, a leading scientist at JINR, and thus it was a "hobbyhorse" for the facility. In contrast, the LBL scientists believed fission information was not sufficient for a claim of synthesis of an element. They believed spontaneous fission had not been studied enough to use it for identification of a new element, since there was a difficulty of establishing that a compound nucleus had only ejected neutrons and not charged particles like protons or alpha particles. They thus preferred to link new isotopes to the already known ones by successive alpha decays.)

The information available to physicists aiming to synthesize a superheavy element is thus the information collected at the detectors: location, energy, and time of arrival of a particle to the detector, and those of its decay. The physicists analyze this data and seek to conclude that it was indeed caused by a new element and could not have been caused by a different nuclide than the one claimed. Often, provided data is insufficient for a conclusion that a new element was definitely created and there is no other explanation for the observed effects; errors in interpreting data have been made. (Note: For instance, element 102 was mistakenly identified in 1957 at the Nobel Institute of Physics in Stockholm, Stockholm County, Sweden. There were no earlier definitive claims of creation of this element, and the element was assigned a name by its Swedish, American, and British discoverers, nobelium. It was later shown that the identification was incorrect. The following year, RL was unable to reproduce the Swedish results and announced instead their synthesis of the element; that claim was also disproved later. JINR insisted that they were the first to create the element and suggested a name of their own for the new element, joliotium; the Soviet name was also not accepted (JINR later referred to the naming of the element 102 as "hasty"). This name was proposed to IUPAC in a written response to their ruling on priority of discovery claims of elements, signed 29 September 1992. The name "nobelium" remained unchanged on account of its widespread usage.)

== History ==
=== Discovery ===
Copernicium was first created on 9 February 1996, at the Gesellschaft für Schwerionenforschung (GSI) in Darmstadt, Germany, by Sigurd Hofmann, Victor Ninov et al. This element was created by firing accelerated zinc-70 nuclei at a target made of lead-208 nuclei in a heavy ion accelerator. A single atom of copernicium was produced with a mass number of 277. (A second was originally reported, but was found to have been based on data fabricated by Ninov, and was thus retracted.)

^{208}_{82}Pb + ^{70}_{30}Zn → ^{278}_{112}Cn* → ^{277}_{112}Cn + ^{1}_{0}n

In May 2000, the GSI successfully repeated the experiment to synthesize a further atom of copernicium-277. This reaction was repeated at RIKEN using the Search for a Super-Heavy Element Using a Gas-Filled Recoil Separator set-up in 2004 and 2013 to synthesize three further atoms and confirm the decay data reported by the GSI team. This reaction had also previously been tried in 1971 at the Joint Institute for Nuclear Research in Dubna, Russia to aim for ^{276}Cn (produced in the 2n channel), but without success. Work had also been done there from 1998 to synthesize the heavier isotope ^{283}Cn in the hot fusion reaction ^{238}U(^{48}Ca,3n)^{283}Cn; most observed atoms of ^{283}Cn decayed by spontaneous fission, although an alpha decay branch to ^{279}Ds was detected. While initial experiments aimed to assign the produced nuclide with its observed long half-life of 3 minutes based on its chemical behaviour, this was found to be not mercury-like as would have been expected (copernicium being under mercury in the periodic table), and indeed now it appears that the long-lived activity might not have been from ^{283}Cn at all, but its electron capture daughter ^{283}Rg instead, with a shorter 4-second half-life associated with ^{283}Cn. (Another possibility is assignment to a metastable isomeric state, ^{283m}Cn.) While later cross-bombardments in the ^{242}Pu+^{48}Ca and ^{245}Cm+^{48}Ca reactions succeeded in confirming the properties of ^{283}Cn and its parents ^{287}Fl and ^{291}Lv, and played a major role in the acceptance of the discoveries of flerovium and livermorium (elements 114 and 116) by the JWP in 2011, this work originated subsequent to the GSI's work on ^{277}Cn and priority was assigned to the GSI.

The IUPAC/IUPAP Joint Working Party (JWP) assessed the claim of copernicium's discovery by the GSI team in 2001 and 2003. In both cases, they found that there was insufficient evidence to support their claim. This was primarily related to the contradicting decay data for the known nuclide rutherfordium-261. However, between 2001 and 2005, the GSI team studied the reaction ^{248}Cm(^{26}Mg,5n)^{269}Hs, and were able to confirm the decay data for hassium-269 and rutherfordium-261. It was found that the existing data on rutherfordium-261 was for an isomer, now designated rutherfordium-261m.

In May 2009, the JWP reported on the claims of discovery of element 112 again and officially recognized the GSI team as the discoverers of element 112. This decision was based on the confirmation of the decay properties of daughter nuclei as well as the confirmatory experiments at RIKEN.

=== Naming ===
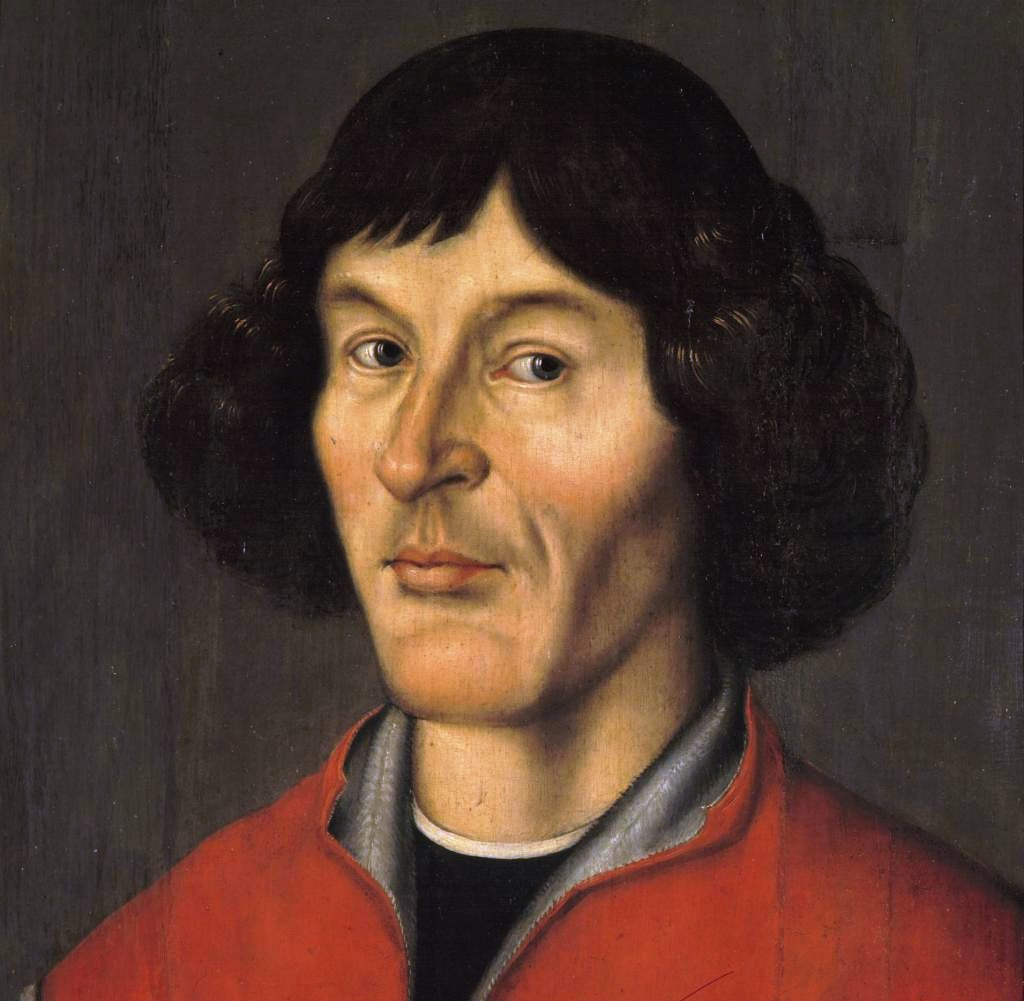
Element 112 was named to honor Nicolaus Copernicus, a scientist from the 16th century

Using Mendeleev's nomenclature for unnamed and undiscovered elements, copernicium should be known as eka-mercury. In 1979, IUPAC published recommendations according to which the element was to be called ununbium (with the corresponding symbol of Uub), a systematic element name as a placeholder, until the element was discovered (and the discovery then confirmed) and a permanent name was decided on. Although widely used in the chemical community on all levels, from chemistry classrooms to advanced textbooks, the recommendations were mostly ignored among scientists in the field, who either called it "element 112", with the symbol of E112, (112), or even simply 112.

After acknowledging the GSI team's discovery, the IUPAC asked them to suggest a permanent name for element 112. On 14 July 2009, they proposed copernicium with the element symbol Cp, after Nicolaus Copernicus "to honor an outstanding scientist, who changed our view of the world".

During the standard six-month discussion period among the scientific community about the naming, it was pointed out that the symbol Cp was previously associated with the name cassiopeium (cassiopium), now known as lutetium (Lu). Moreover, Cp is frequently used today to mean the cyclopentadienyl ligand (C_{5}H_{5}). Primarily because cassiopeium (Cp) was (until 1949) accepted by IUPAC as an alternative allowed name for lutetium, the IUPAC disallowed the use of Cp as a future symbol, prompting the GSI team to put forward the symbol Cn as an alternative. On 19 February 2010, the 537th anniversary of Copernicus' birth, IUPAC officially accepted the proposed name and symbol.

== Isotopes ==
List of copernicium isotopes
Isotope	Half-life (Note: Different sources give different values for half-lives; the most recently published values are listed.)		Decay mode	Discovery year	Discovery reaction
Isotope	Value	ref	Decay mode	Discovery year	Discovery reaction
^{277}Cn	0.79 ms		α	1996	^{208}Pb(^{70}Zn,n)
^{280}Cn	<0.1 ms		SF	2025	^{288}Lv(—,2α)
^{281}Cn	0.18 s		α	2010	^{285}Fl(—,α)
^{282}Cn	0.83 ms		SF	2004	^{290}Lv(—,2α)
^{283}Cn	3.81 s		α, SF, EC?	2004	^{287}Fl(—,α)
^{284}Cn	121 ms		α, SF	2004	^{288}Fl(—,α)
^{285}Cn	30 s		α	2004	^{289}Fl(—,α)
^{285m}Cn (Note: This isotope is unconfirmed)	15 s		α	2012	^{293m}Lv(—,2α)
^{286}Cn	8.45 s		SF	(2016)	^{294}Lv(—,2α)

Copernicium has no stable or naturally occurring isotopes. Several radioactive isotopes have been synthesized in the laboratory, either by fusing two atoms or by observing the decay of heavier elements. Eight different isotopes have been reported with mass numbers 277 and 280–286, and one unconfirmed metastable isomer in ^{285}Cn has been reported. Most of these decay predominantly through alpha decay, but some undergo spontaneous fission, and copernicium-283 may have an electron capture branch.

The isotope copernicium-283 was instrumental in the confirmation of the discoveries of the elements flerovium and livermorium.

=== Half-lives ===
All confirmed copernicium isotopes are extremely unstable and radioactive; in general, heavier isotopes are more stable than the lighter, and isotopes with an odd neutron number have relatively longer half-lives due to additional hindrance against spontaneous fission. The most stable known isotope, ^{285}Cn, has a half-life of 30 seconds; ^{283}Cn has a half-life of 4 seconds, and the unconfirmed ^{285m}Cn and ^{286}Cn have half-lives of about 15 and 8.45 seconds respectively. Other isotopes have half-lives shorter than one second. ^{281}Cn and ^{284}Cn both have half-lives on the order of 0.1 seconds, and the remaining isotopes have half-lives shorter than one millisecond. It is predicted that the heavy isotopes ^{291}Cn and ^{293}Cn may have half-lives longer than a few decades, for they are predicted to lie near the center of the theoretical island of stability, and may have been produced in the r-process and be detectable in cosmic rays, though they would be about 10^{−12} times as abundant as lead.

The lightest isotopes of copernicium have been synthesized by direct fusion between two lighter nuclei and as decay products (except for ^{277}Cn, which is not known to be a decay product), while the heavier isotopes are only known to be produced by decay of heavier nuclei. The heaviest isotope produced by direct fusion is ^{283}Cn; the three heavier isotopes, ^{284}Cn, ^{285}Cn, and ^{286}Cn, have only been observed as decay products of elements with larger atomic numbers.

In 1999, American scientists at the University of California, Berkeley, announced that they had succeeded in synthesizing three atoms of ^{293}Og. These parent nuclei were reported to have successively emitted three alpha particles to form copernicium-281 nuclei, which were claimed to have undergone alpha decay, emitting alpha particles with decay energy 10.68 MeV and half-life 0.90 ms, but their claim was retracted in 2001 as it had been based on data fabricated by Ninov. This isotope was truly produced in 2010 by the same team; the new data contradicted the previous fabricated data.

The missing isotopes ^{278}Cn and ^{279}Cn are too heavy to be produced by cold fusion and too light to be produced by hot fusion. They might be filled from above by decay of heavier elements produced by hot fusion, and indeed ^{280}Cn and ^{281}Cn were produced this way. The isotopes ^{286}Cn and ^{287}Cn could be produced by charged-particle evaporation, in the reaction ^{244}Pu(^{48}Ca,αxn) with x equalling 1 or 2.

== Predicted properties ==
Very few properties of copernicium or its compounds have been measured; this is due to its extremely limited and expensive production and the fact that copernicium (and its parents) decays very quickly. A few singular chemical properties have been measured, as well as the boiling point, but properties of the copernicium metal remain generally unknown and for the most part, only predictions are available.

=== Chemical ===
Copernicium is the tenth and last member of the 6d series and is the heaviest group 12 element in the periodic table, below zinc, cadmium and mercury. It is predicted to differ significantly from the lighter group 12 elements. The valence s-subshells of the group 12 elements and period 7 elements are expected to be relativistically contracted most strongly at copernicium. This and the closed-shell configuration of copernicium result in it probably being a very noble metal. A standard reduction potential of +2.1 V is predicted for the Cn^{2+}/Cn couple. Copernicium's predicted first ionization energy of 1155 kJ/mol almost matches that of the noble gas xenon at 1170.4 kJ/mol. Copernicium's metallic bonds should also be very weak, possibly making it extremely volatile like the noble gases, and potentially making it gaseous at room temperature. However, it should be able to form metal–metal bonds with copper, palladium, platinum, silver, and gold; these bonds are predicted to be only about 15–20 kJ/mol weaker than the analogous bonds with mercury. In opposition to the earlier suggestion, ab initio calculations at the high level of accuracy predicted that the chemistry of singly-valent copernicium resembles that of mercury rather than that of the noble gases. The latter result can be explained by the huge spin–orbit interaction which significantly lowers the energy of the vacant 7p_{1/2} state of copernicium.

Once copernicium is ionized, its chemistry may present several differences from those of zinc, cadmium, and mercury. Due to the stabilization of 7s electronic orbitals and destabilization of 6d ones caused by relativistic effects, Cn^{2+} is likely to have a [Rn]5f^{14}6d^{8}7s^{2} electronic configuration, using the 6d orbitals before the 7s one, unlike its homologues. The fact that the 6d electrons participate more readily in chemical bonding means that once copernicium is ionized, it may behave more like a transition metal than its lighter homologues, especially in the possible +4 oxidation state. In aqueous solutions, copernicium may form the +2 and perhaps +4 oxidation states. The diatomic ion Hg^{2+}_{2}, featuring mercury in the +1 oxidation state, is well-known, but the Cn^{2+}_{2} ion is predicted to be unstable or even non-existent. Copernicium(II) fluoride, CnF_{2}, should be more unstable than the analogous mercury compound, mercury(II) fluoride (HgF_{2}), and may even decompose spontaneously into its constituent elements. As the most electronegative reactive element, fluorine may be the only element able to oxidize copernicium even further to the +4 and even +6 oxidation states in CnF_{4} and CnF_{6}; the latter may require matrix-isolation conditions to be detected, as in the disputed detection of HgF_{4}. CnF_{4} should be more stable than CnF_{2}. In polar solvents, copernicium is predicted to preferentially form the CnF^{−}_{5} and CnF^{−}_{3} anions rather than the analogous neutral fluorides (CnF_{4} and CnF_{2}, respectively), although the analogous bromide or iodide ions may be more stable towards hydrolysis in aqueous solution. The anions CnCl^{2−}_{4} and CnBr^{2−}_{4} should also be able to exist in aqueous solution. The formation of thermodynamically stable copernicium(II) and (IV) fluorides would be analogous to the chemistry of xenon. Analogous to mercury(II) cyanide (Hg(CN)_{2}), copernicium is expected to form a stable cyanide, Cn(CN)_{2}.

=== Physical and atomic ===
Copernicium should be a dense metal, with a density of 14.0 g/cm^{3} in the liquid state at 300 K; this is similar to the known density of mercury, which is 13.534 g/cm^{3}. (Solid copernicium at the same temperature should have a higher density of 14.7 g/cm^{3}.) This results from the effects of copernicium's higher atomic weight being cancelled out by its larger interatomic distances compared to mercury. Some calculations predicted copernicium to be a gas at room temperature due to its closed-shell electron configuration, which would make it the first gaseous metal in the periodic table. A 2019 calculation agrees with these predictions on the role of relativistic effects, suggesting that copernicium will be a volatile liquid bound by dispersion forces under standard conditions. Its melting point is estimated at 283±11 K and its boiling point at 340±10 K, the latter in agreement with the experimentally estimated value of 357+112
−108 K. The atomic radius of copernicium is expected to be around 147 pm. Due to the relativistic stabilization of the 7s orbital and destabilization of the 6d orbital, the Cn^{+} and Cn^{2+} ions are predicted to give up 6d electrons instead of 7s electrons, which is the opposite of the behavior of its lighter homologues.

In addition to the relativistic contraction and binding of the 7s subshell, the 6d_{5/2} orbital is expected to be destabilized due to spin–orbit coupling, making it behave similarly to the 7s orbital in terms of size, shape, and energy. Predictions of the expected band structure of copernicium are varied. Calculations in 2007 expected that copernicium may be a semiconductor with a band gap of around 0.2 eV, crystallizing in the hexagonal close-packed crystal structure. However, calculations in 2017 and 2018 suggested that copernicium should be a noble metal at standard conditions with a body-centered cubic crystal structure: it should hence have no band gap, like mercury, although the density of states at the Fermi level is expected to be lower for copernicium than for mercury. 2019 calculations then suggested that in fact copernicium has a large band gap of 6.4 ± 0.2 eV, which should be similar to that of the noble gas radon (predicted as 7.1 eV) and would make it an insulator; bulk copernicium is predicted by these calculations to be bound mostly by dispersion forces, like the noble gases. Like mercury, radon, and flerovium, but not oganesson (eka-radon), copernicium is calculated to have no electron affinity.

== Experimental atomic gas phase chemistry ==
Interest in copernicium's chemistry was sparked by predictions that it would have the largest relativistic effects in the whole of period 7 and group 12, and indeed among all 118 known elements. Copernicium is expected to have the ground state electron configuration [Rn] 5f^{14} 6d^{10} 7s^{2} and thus should belong to group 12 of the periodic table, according to the Aufbau principle. As such, it should behave as the heavier homologue of mercury and form strong binary compounds with noble metals like gold. Experiments probing the reactivity of copernicium have focused on the adsorption of atoms of element 112 onto a gold surface held at varying temperatures, in order to calculate an adsorption enthalpy. Owing to relativistic stabilization of the 7s electrons, copernicium shows radon-like properties. Experiments were performed with the simultaneous formation of mercury and radon radioisotopes, allowing a comparison of adsorption characteristics.

The first chemical experiments on copernicium were conducted using the ^{238}U(^{48}Ca,3n)^{283}Cn reaction. Detection was by spontaneous fission of the claimed parent isotope with half-life of 5 minutes. Analysis of the data indicated that copernicium was more volatile than mercury and had noble gas properties. However, the confusion regarding the synthesis of copernicium-283 has cast some doubt on these experimental results. Given this uncertainty, between April–May 2006 at the JINR, a FLNR–PSI team conducted experiments probing the synthesis of this isotope as a daughter in the nuclear reaction ^{242}Pu(^{48}Ca,3n)^{287}Fl. (The ^{242}Pu + ^{48}Ca fusion reaction has a slightly larger cross-section than the ^{238}U + ^{48}Ca reaction, so that the best way to produce copernicium for chemical experimentation is as an overshoot product as the daughter of flerovium.) In this experiment, two atoms of copernicium-283 were unambiguously identified and the adsorption properties were interpreted to show that copernicium is a more volatile homologue of mercury, due to formation of a weak metal-metal bond with gold. This agrees with general indications from some relativistic calculations that copernicium is "more or less" homologous to mercury. However, it was pointed out in 2019 that this result may simply be due to strong dispersion interactions.

In April 2007, this experiment was repeated and a further three atoms of copernicium-283 were positively identified. The adsorption property was confirmed and indicated that copernicium has adsorption properties in agreement with being the heaviest member of group 12. These experiments also allowed the first experimental estimation of copernicium's boiling point: 84^{+112}_{−108} °C, so that it may be a gas at standard conditions.

Because the lighter group 12 elements often occur as chalcogenide ores, experiments were conducted in 2015 to deposit copernicium atoms on a selenium surface to form copernicium selenide, CnSe. Reaction of copernicium atoms with trigonal selenium to form a selenide was observed, with -ΔH_{ads}^{Cn}(t-Se) > 48 kJ/mol, with the kinetic hindrance towards selenide formation being lower for copernicium than for mercury. This was unexpected as the stability of the group 12 selenides tends to decrease down the group from ZnSe to HgSe.

== See also ==
- Island of stability

== Bibliography ==
- Audi, G.; Kondev, F. G.; Wang, M.; Huang, W. J.; Naimi, S. (2017). "The NUBASE2016 evaluation of nuclear properties". Chinese Physics C. 41 (3). 030001. Bibcode:2017ChPhC..41c0001A. doi:10.1088/1674-1137/41/3/030001.
- Beiser, A. (2003). Concepts of modern physics (6th ed.). McGraw-Hill. ISBN 978-0-07-244848-1. OCLC 48965418.
- Hoffman, D. C.; Ghiorso, A.; Seaborg, G. T. (2000). The Transuranium People: The Inside Story. World Scientific. ISBN 978-1-78-326244-1.
- Kragh, H. (2018). From Transuranic to Superheavy Elements: A Story of Dispute and Creation. Springer. ISBN 978-3-319-75813-8.
- Zagrebaev, Valeriy; Karpov, Alexander; Greiner, Walter (2013). "Future of superheavy element research: Which nuclei could be synthesized within the next few years?" (PDF). 11th International Conference on Nucleus-Nucleus Collisions (NN2012). Journal of Physics: Conference Series. Vol. 420. IOP Publishing. doi:10.1088/1742-6596/420/1/012001.
