= Isotopes of hassium =

Isotopes of hassium (_{108}Hs)
Main isotopes			Decay	
Isotope	abundance	half-life (t_{1/2})	mode	product
^{269}Hs	synth	13 s	α	^{265}Sg
^{270}Hs	synth	7.6 s	α	^{266}Sg
^{271}Hs	synth	46 s	α	^{267}Sg
^{277m}Hs	synth	130 s?	SF	–

Hassium (_{108}Hs) is a synthetic element, and thus a standard atomic weight cannot be given. Like all synthetic elements, it has no stable isotopes. The first isotope to be synthesized was ^{265}Hs in 1984. There are 13 known isotopes from ^{263}Hs to ^{277}Hs and up to six isomers. The most stable known isotope is ^{271}Hs, with a half-life of about 46 seconds, though this assignment is not definite due to uncertainty arising from a low number of measurements. The isotopes ^{269}Hs and ^{270}Hs respectively have half-lives of about 13 seconds and 7.6 seconds. It is also possible that the isomer ^{277m}Hs is more stable than these, but only one event of the decay of this isomer has been registered as of 2020.

== List of isotopes ==
Nuclide (Note: ^{m}Hs – Excited nuclear isomer.)	Z	N	Isotopic mass (Da) (Note: ( ) – Uncertainty (1σ) is given in concise form in parentheses after the corresponding last digits.) (Note: # – Atomic mass marked #: value and uncertainty derived not from purely experimental data, but at least partly from trends from the Mass Surface (TMS).)	Discovery year	Half-life	Decay mode (Note: Modes of decay: SF: / Spontaneous fission)	Daughter isotope	Spin and parity (Note: # – Values marked # are not purely derived from experimental data, but at least partly from trends of neighboring nuclides (TNN).)
Nuclide	Excitation energy			Discovery year	Half-life	Decay mode	Daughter isotope	Spin and parity
^{263}Hs	108	155	263.12848(21)#	2009	0.74+0.48 −0.21 ms [0.9(4) ms]	α	^{259}Sg	3/2+#
^{264}Hs	108	156	264.12836(3)	1986	0.63+0.34 −0.16 s [0.7(3) s]	α (70%)	^{260}Sg	0+
^{264}Hs	108	156	264.12836(3)	1986	0.63+0.34 −0.16 s [0.7(3) s]	SF (30%)	(various)	0+
^{265}Hs	108	157	265.129792(26)	1984	1.96(16) ms	α	^{261}Sg	9/2+#
^{265m}Hs	229(22) keV			2009	300+200 −100 μs [360(150) μs]	α	^{261}Sg	3/2+#
^{266}Hs (Note: Not directly synthesized, occurs as decay product of ^{270}Ds)	108	158	266.130049(29)	2001	3.0(6) ms	α (76%)	^{262}Sg	0+
^{266}Hs	108	158	266.130049(29)	2001	3.0(6) ms	SF (24%)	(various)	0+
^{266m}Hs	1100(90) keV			2015	74+354 −34 ms [280(220) ms]	α	^{262}Sg	9−#
^{267}Hs	108	159	267.13168(10)#	1995	52+13 −8 ms [55(11) ms]	α	^{263}Sg	5/2+#
^{267m}Hs (Note: Discovery of this isomer is unconfirmed)	39(24) keV			2004	940+120 −45 μs [990(90) μs]	α	^{263}Sg	
^{268}Hs	108	160	268.13201(32)#	2010	0.38+1.8 −0.17 s [1.4(1.1) s]	α	^{264}Sg	0+
^{269}Hs	108	161	269.13365(14)#	1996	13+10 −4 s	α	^{265}Sg	9/2+#
^{269m}Hs	20 keV#			2024	2.8+13.6 −1.3 s	α	^{265m}Sg	1/2#
^{269m}Hs	20 keV#			2024	2.8+13.6 −1.3 s	IT	^{269}Hs	1/2#
^{270}Hs	108	162	270.13431(27)#	2006	7.6+4.9 −2.2 s [9(4) s]	α	^{266}Sg	0+
^{271}Hs	108	163	271.13708(30)#	2008	46+56 −16 s	α	^{267}Sg	11/2#
^{271m}Hs	20 keV#			2024	7.1+8.4 −2.5 s	α	^{267m}Sg	3/2#
^{271m}Hs	20 keV#			2024	7.1+8.4 −2.5 s	IT	^{271}Hs	3/2#
^{272}Hs (Note: Not directly synthesized, occurs in decay chain of ^{276}Ds)	108	164	272.13849(55)#	2023	160+190 −60 ms	α	^{268}Sg	0+
^{273}Hs (Note: Not directly synthesized, occurs in decay chain of ^{285}Fl)	108	165	273.14146(40)#	2010	0.68+0.30 −0.16 s [1.06(50) s]	α	^{269}Sg	3/2+#
^{275}Hs (Note: Not directly synthesized, occurs in decay chain of ^{287}Fl)	108	167	275.14653(64)#	2004	600+230 −130 ms	α	^{271}Sg	
^{275}Hs	108	167	275.14653(64)#	2004	600+230 −130 ms	SF (<11%)	(various)	
^{277}Hs (Note: Not directly synthesized, occurs in decay chain of ^{289}Fl)	108	169	277.15177(48)#	2010	18+25 −7 ms	SF	(various)	3/2+#
^{277m}Hs	100(100) keV#			2012	34+166 −16 s [130(100) s]	SF	(various)	
^{278}Hs (Note: Not directly synthesized, occurs in decay chain of ^{290}Fl, unconfirmed)	108	170	278.15375(32)#	(2016)		SF	(various)	0+
This table header & footer:

== Isotopes and nuclear properties ==
=== Target-projectile combinations leading to Z=108 compound nuclei ===
Target	Projectile	CN	Attempt result
^{136}Xe	^{136}Xe	^{272}Hs	Failure to date
^{198}Pt	^{70}Zn	^{268}Hs	Failure to date
^{208}Pb	^{58}Fe	^{266}Hs	Successful reaction
^{207}Pb	^{58}Fe	^{265}Hs	Successful reaction
^{208}Pb	^{56}Fe	^{264}Hs	Successful reaction
^{207}Pb	^{56}Fe	^{263}Hs	Reaction yet to be attempted
^{206}Pb	^{58}Fe	^{264}Hs	Successful reaction
^{209}Bi	^{55}Mn	^{264}Hs	Failure to date
^{226}Ra	^{48}Ca	^{274}Hs	Successful reaction
^{232}Th	^{40}Ar	^{272}Hs	Reaction yet to be attempted
^{238}U	^{36}S	^{274}Hs	Successful reaction
^{238}U	^{34}S	^{272}Hs	Successful reaction
^{244}Pu	^{30}Si	^{274}Hs	Reaction yet to be attempted
^{248}Cm	^{26}Mg	^{274}Hs	Successful reaction
^{248}Cm	^{25}Mg	^{273}Hs	Failure to date
^{250}Cm	^{26}Mg	^{276}Hs	Reaction yet to be attempted
^{249}Cf	^{22}Ne	^{271}Hs	Successful reaction

=== Nucleosynthesis ===
Superheavy elements such as hassium are produced by bombarding lighter elements in particle accelerators that induce fusion reactions. Whereas most of the isotopes of hassium can be synthesized directly this way, some heavier ones have only been observed as decay products of elements with higher atomic numbers.

Depending on the energies involved, the former are separated into "hot" and "cold". In hot fusion reactions, very light, high-energy projectiles are accelerated toward very heavy targets (actinides), giving rise to compound nuclei at high excitation energy (~40–50 MeV) that may either fission or evaporate several (3 to 5) neutrons. In cold fusion reactions, the produced fused nuclei have a relatively low excitation energy (~10–20 MeV), which decreases the probability that these products will undergo fission reactions. As the fused nuclei cool to the ground state, they require emission of only one or two neutrons, and thus, allows for the generation of more neutron-rich products. The latter is a distinct concept from that of where nuclear fusion claimed to be achieved at room temperature conditions (see cold fusion).

==== Cold fusion ====
Before the first successful synthesis of hassium in 1984 by the GSI team, scientists at the Joint Institute for Nuclear Research (JINR) in Dubna, Russia also tried to synthesize hassium by bombarding lead-208 with iron-58 in 1978. No hassium atoms were identified. They repeated the experiment in 1984 and were able to detect a spontaneous fission activity assigned to ^{260}Sg, the daughter of ^{264}Hs. Later that year, they tried the experiment again, and tried to chemically identify the decay products of hassium to provide support to their synthesis of element 108. They were able to detect several alpha decays of ^{253}Es and ^{253}Fm, decay products of ^{265}Hs.

In the official discovery of the element in 1984, the team at GSI studied the same reaction using the alpha decay genetic correlation method and were able to positively identify 3 atoms of ^{265}Hs. After an upgrade of their facilities in 1993, the team repeated the experiment in 1994 and detected 75 atoms of ^{265}Hs and 2 atoms of ^{264}Hs, during the measurement of a partial excitation function for the 1n neutron evaporation channel. A further run of the reaction was conducted in late 1997 in which a further 20 atoms were detected. This discovery experiment was successfully repeated in 2002 at RIKEN (10 atoms) and in 2003 at GANIL (7 atoms). The team at RIKEN further studied the reaction in 2008 in order to conduct the first spectroscopic studies of the even-even nucleus ^{264}Hs. They were also able to detect a further 29 atoms of ^{265}Hs.

The team at Dubna also conducted the analogous reaction with a lead-207 target instead of a lead-208 target in 1984:

^{207}_{82}Pb + ^{58}_{26}Fe → ^{264}_{108}Hs + n

They were able to detect the same spontaneous fission activity as observed in the reaction with a lead-208 target and once again assigned it to ^{260}Sg, daughter of ^{264}Hs. The team at GSI first studied the reaction in 1986 using the method of genetic correlation of alpha decays and identified a single atom of ^{264}Hs with a cross section of 3.2 pb. The reaction was repeated in 1994 and the team were able to measure both alpha decay and spontaneous fission for ^{264}Hs. This reaction was also studied in 2008 at RIKEN in order to conduct the first spectroscopic studies of the even-even nucleus ^{264}Hs. The team detected 11 atoms of ^{264}Hs.

In 2008, the team at RIKEN conducted the analogous reaction with a lead-206 target for the first time:

^{206}_{82}Pb + ^{58}_{26}Fe → ^{263}_{108}Hs + n

They were able to identify 8 atoms of the new isotope ^{263}Hs.

In 2008, the team at the Lawrence Berkeley National Laboratory (LBNL) studied the analogous reaction with iron-56 projectiles for the first time:

^{208}_{82}Pb + ^{56}_{26}Fe → ^{263}_{108}Hs + n

They were able to produce and identify six atoms of the new isotope ^{263}Hs. A few months later, the RIKEN team also published their results on the same reaction.

Further attempts to synthesise nuclei of hassium were performed the team at Dubna in 1983 using the cold fusion reaction between a bismuth-209 target and manganese-55 projectiles:

^{209}_{83}Bi + ^{55}_{25}Mn → ^{264−x}_{108}Hs + x n (x = 1 or 2)

They were able to detect a spontaneous fission activity assigned to ^{255}Rf, a product of the ^{263}Hs decay chain. Identical results were measured in a repeat run in 1984. In a subsequent experiment in 1983, they applied the method of chemical identification of a descendant to provide support to the synthesis of hassium. They were able to detect alpha decays from fermium isotopes, assigned as descendants of the decay of ^{262}Hs. This reaction has not been tried since and ^{262}Hs is currently unconfirmed.

==== Hot fusion ====
Under the leadership of Yuri Oganessian, the team at the Joint Institute for Nuclear Research studied the hot fusion reaction between calcium-48 projectiles and radium-226 targets in 1978:

^{226}_{88}Ra + ^{48}_{20}Ca → ^{270}_{108}Hs + 4 n

However, results are not available in the literature. The reaction was repeated at the JINR in June 2008 and 4 atoms of the isotope ^{270}Hs were detected. In January 2009, the team repeated the experiment and a further 2 atoms of ^{270}Hs were detected.

The team at Dubna studied the reaction between californium-249 targets and neon-22 projectiles in 1983 by detecting spontaneous fission activities:

^{249}_{98}Cf + ^{22}_{10}Ne → ^{271−x}_{108}Hs + x n

Several short spontaneous fission activities were found, indicating the formation of nuclei of hassium.

The hot fusion reaction between uranium-238 targets and projectiles of the rare and expensive isotope sulfur-36 was conducted at the GSI in April–May 2008:

^{238}_{92}U + ^{36}_{16}S → ^{270}_{108}Hs + 4 n

Preliminary results show that a single atom of ^{270}Hs was detected. This experiment confirmed the decay properties of the isotopes ^{270}Hs and ^{266}Sg.

In March 1994, the team at Dubna led by the late Yuri Lazarev attempted the analogous reaction with sulfur-34 projectiles:

^{238}_{92}U + ^{34}_{16}S → ^{272−x}_{108}Hs + x n (x = 4 or 5)

They announced the detection of 3 atoms of ^{267}Hs from the 5n neutron evaporation channel. The decay properties were confirmed by the team at GSI in their simultaneous study of darmstadtium. The reaction was repeated at the GSI in January–February 2009 in order to search for the new isotope ^{268}Hs. The team, led by Prof. Nishio, detected a single atom each of both ^{268}Hs and ^{267}Hs. The new isotope ^{268}Hs underwent alpha decay to the previously known isotope ^{264}Sg.

Between May 2001 and August 2005, a GSI–PSI (Paul Scherrer Institute) collaboration studied the nuclear reaction between curium-248 targets and magnesium-26 projectiles:

^{248}_{96}Cm + ^{26}_{12}Mg → ^{274−x}_{108}Hs + x n (x = 3, 4, or 5)

The team studied the excitation function of the 3n, 4n, and 5n evaporation channels leading to the isotopes ^{269}Hs, ^{270}Hs, and ^{271}Hs. The synthesis of the doubly magic isotope ^{270}Hs was published in December 2006 by the team of scientists from the Technical University of Munich. It was reported that this isotope decayed by emission of an alpha particle with an energy of 8.83 MeV and a half-life of ~22 s. This figure has since been revised to 3.6 s.

==== As decay product ====
List of hassium isotopes observed by decay
Evaporation residue	Observed hassium isotope
^{267}Ds	^{263}Hs
^{269}Ds	^{265}Hs
^{270}Ds	^{266}Hs
^{271}Ds	^{267}Hs
^{277}Cn, ^{273}Ds	^{269}Hs
^{276}Ds	^{272}Hs
^{285}Fl, ^{281}Cn, ^{277}Ds	^{273}Hs
^{291}Lv, ^{287}Fl, ^{283}Cn, ^{279}Ds	^{275}Hs
^{293}Lv, ^{289}Fl, ^{285}Cn, ^{281}Ds	^{277}Hs

Hassium isotopes have been observed as decay products of darmstadtium. Darmstadtium currently has ten known isotopes, all but one of which have been shown to undergo alpha decays to become hassium nuclei with mass numbers between 263 and 277. Hassium isotopes with mass numbers 266, 272, 273, 275, and 277 to date have only been produced by decay of darmstadtium nuclei. Parent darmstadtium nuclei can be themselves decay products of copernicium, flerovium, or livermorium. For example, in 2004, the Dubna team identified hassium-277 as a final product in the decay of livermorium-293 via an alpha decay sequence:

^{293}_{116}Lv → ^{289}_{114}Fl + ^{4}_{2}He
^{289}_{114}Fl → ^{285}_{112}Cn + ^{4}_{2}He
^{285}_{112}Cn → ^{281}_{110}Ds + ^{4}_{2}He
^{281}_{110}Ds → ^{277}_{108}Hs + ^{4}_{2}He

=== Unconfirmed isotopes ===
^{277m}Hs

An isotope assigned to ^{277}Hs has been observed on one occasion decaying by SF with a long half-life of ~11 minutes. The isotope is not observed in the decay of the ground state of ^{281}Ds but is observed in the decay from a rare, as yet unconfirmed isomeric level, namely ^{281m}Ds. The half-life is very long for the ground state and it is possible that it belongs to an isomeric level in ^{277}Hs. It has also been suggested that this activity actually comes from ^{278}Bh, formed as the great-great-granddaughter of ^{290}Fl through one electron capture to ^{290}Nh and three further alpha decays. Furthermore, in 2009, the team at the GSI observed a small alpha decay branch for ^{281}Ds producing the nuclide ^{277}Hs decaying by SF in a short lifetime. The measured half-life is close to the expected value for ground state isomer, ^{277}Hs. Further research is required to confirm the production of the isomer.

=== Retracted isotopes ===
^{273}Hs

In 1999, American scientists at the University of California, Berkeley, announced that they had succeeded in synthesizing three atoms of ^{293}118. These parent nuclei were reported to have successively emitted five alpha particles to form hassium-273 nuclei, which were claimed to have undergone an alpha decay, emitting alpha particles with decay energies of 9.78 and 9.47 MeV and half-life 1.2 s, but their claim was retracted in 2001. The isotope, however, was produced in 2010 by the same team. The new data matched the previous (fabricated) data.

=== ^{270}Hs: prospects for a deformed doubly magic nucleus ===
According to macroscopic-microscopic (MM) theory, Z = 108 is a deformed proton magic number, in combination with the neutron shell at N = 162. This means that such nuclei are permanently deformed in their ground state but have high, narrow fission barriers to further deformation and hence relatively long SF partial half-lives. The SF half-lives in this region are typically reduced by a factor of 10^{9} in comparison with those in the vicinity of the spherical doubly magic nucleus ^{298}Fl, caused by an increase in the probability of barrier penetration by quantum tunnelling, due to the narrower fission barrier. In addition, N = 162 has been calculated as a deformed neutron magic number and hence the nucleus ^{270}Hs has promise as a deformed doubly magic nucleus. Experimental data from the decay of Z = 110 isotopes ^{271}Ds and ^{273}Ds, provides strong evidence for the magic nature of the N = 162 sub-shell. The recent synthesis of ^{269}Hs, ^{270}Hs, and ^{271}Hs also fully support the assignment of N = 162 as a magic closed shell. In particular, the low decay energy for ^{270}Hs is in complete agreement with calculations.

==== Evidence for the Z = 108 deformed proton shell ====
Evidence for the magicity of the Z = 108 proton shell can be deemed from two sources:

1. the variation in the partial spontaneous fission half-lives for isotones
2. the large gap in Q_{α} for isotonic pairs between Z = 108 and Z = 110.

For SF, it is necessary to measure the half-lives for the isotonic nuclei ^{268}Sg, ^{270}Hs and ^{272}Ds. Since fission of ^{270}Hs has not been measured, detailed data of ^{268}Sg fission is not yet available, and ^{272}Ds is still unknown, this method cannot be used to date to confirm the stabilizing nature of the Z = 108 shell. However, good evidence for the magicity of Z = 108 can be deemed from the large differences in the alpha decay energies measured for ^{270}Hs, ^{271}Ds and ^{273}Ds. More conclusive evidence would come from the determination of the decay energy of the yet-unknown nuclide ^{272}Ds.

=== Nuclear isomerism ===
^{277}Hs

An isotope assigned to ^{277}Hs has been observed on one occasion decaying by spontaneous fission with a long half-life of ~11 minutes. The isotope is not observed in the decay of the most common isomer of ^{281}Ds but is observed in the decay from a rare, as yet unconfirmed isomeric level, namely ^{281m}Ds. The half-life is very long for the ground state and it is possible that it belongs to an isomeric level in ^{277}Hs. Furthermore, in 2009, the team at the GSI observed a small alpha decay branch for ^{281}Ds producing an isotope of ^{277}Hs decaying by spontaneous fission with a short lifetime. The measured half-life is close to the expected value for ground state isomer, ^{277}Hs. Further research is required to confirm the production of the isomer. A more recent study suggests that this observed activity may actually be from ^{278}Bh.

^{269}Hs

The direct synthesis of ^{269}Hs has resulted in the observation of three alpha particles with energies 9.21, 9.10, and 8.94 MeV emitted from ^{269}Hs atoms. However, when this isotope is indirectly synthesized from the decay of ^{277}Cn, only alpha particles with energy 9.21 MeV have been observed, indicating that this decay occurs from an isomeric level. Further research is required to confirm this.

^{267}Hs

^{267}Hs is known to decay by alpha decay, emitting alpha particles with energies of 9.88, 9.83, and 9.75 MeV. It has a half-life of 52 ms. In the recent syntheses of ^{271}Ds and ^{271m}Ds, additional activities have been observed. A 0.94 ms activity emitting alpha particles with energy 9.83 MeV has been observed in addition to longer lived ~0.8 s and ~6.0 s activities. Currently, none of these are assigned and confirmed and further research is required to positively identify them.

^{265}Hs

The synthesis of ^{265}Hs has also provided evidence for two isomeric levels. The ground state decays by emission of an alpha particle with energy 10.30 MeV and has a half-life of 2.0 ms. The isomeric state has 300 keV of excess energy and decays by the emission of an alpha particle with energy 10.57 MeV and has a half-life of 0.75 ms.

Future experiments

Scientists at the GSI are planning to search for isomers of ^{270}Hs using the reaction ^{226}Ra(^{48}Ca,4n) in 2010 using the new TASCA facility at the GSI. In addition, they also hope to study the spectroscopy of ^{269}Hs, ^{265}Sg and ^{261}Rf, using the reaction ^{248}Cm(^{26}Mg,5n) or ^{226}Ra(^{48}Ca,5n). This will allow them to determine the level structure in ^{265}Sg and ^{261}Rf and attempt to give spin and parity assignments to the various proposed isomers.

=== Physical production yields ===
The tables below provides cross-sections and excitation energies for nuclear reactions that produce isotopes of hassium directly. Data in bold represent maxima derived from excitation function measurements. + represents an observed exit channel.

==== Cold fusion ====
Projectile	Target	CN	1n	2n	3n
^{58}Fe	^{208}Pb	^{266}Hs	**69 pb, 13.9 MeV**	4.5 pb	
^{58}Fe	^{207}Pb	^{265}Hs	3.2 pb		

==== Hot fusion ====
Projectile	Target	CN	3n	4n	5n
^{48}Ca	^{226}Ra	^{274}Hs		9.0 pb	
^{36}S	^{238}U	^{274}Hs		0.8 pb	
^{34}S	^{238}U	^{272}Hs			2.5 pb, 50.0 MeV
^{26}Mg	^{248}Cm	^{274}Hs	**2.5 pb**	**3.0 pb**	**7.0 pb**

=== Theoretical calculations ===
==== Evaporation residue cross sections ====
The below table contains various targets-projectile combinations for which calculations have provided estimates for cross section yields from various neutron evaporation channels. The channel with the highest expected yield is given.

DNS = Di-nuclear system; σ = cross section

Target	Projectile	CN	Channel (product)	σ _{max}	Model	Ref
^{136}Xe	^{136}Xe	^{272}Hs	1–4n (^{271–268}Hs)	10^{−6} pb	DNS	
^{238}U	^{34}S	^{272}Hs	4n (^{268}Hs)	10 pb	DNS	
^{238}U	^{36}S	^{274}Hs	4n (^{270}Hs)	42.97 pb	DNS	
^{244}Pu	^{30}Si	^{274}Hs	4n (^{270}Hs)	185.1 pb	DNS	
^{248}Cm	^{26}Mg	^{274}Hs	4n (^{270}Hs)	719.1 pb	DNS	
^{250}Cm	^{26}Mg	^{276}Hs	4n (^{272}Hs)	185.2 pb	DNS	
