= Yrast =

State of a nucleus with a minimum of energy

Yrast (/ˈɪræst/ IRR-ast, Swedish: [ˈy̌ːrast]) is a technical term in nuclear physics that refers to a state of a nucleus with a minimum of energy (when it is least excited) for a given angular momentum. Yr is a Swedish adjective sharing the same root as the English whirl. Yrast is the superlative of yr and can be translated whirlingest, although it literally means "dizziest" or "most bewildered". The yrast levels are vital to understanding reactions, such as off-center heavy ion collisions, that result in high-spin states.

Yrare is the comparative of yr and is used to refer to the second-least energetic state of a given angular momentum.

== Background ==
An unstable nucleus may decay in several different ways: it can eject a neutron, proton, alpha particle, or other fragment; it can emit a gamma ray; or it can undergo beta decay. Because of the relative strengths of the fundamental interactions associated with those processes (the strong interaction, electromagnetism, and the weak interaction respectively), they usually occur with frequencies in that order. Theoretically, a nucleus has a very small probability of emitting a gamma ray even if it could eject a neutron, and beta decay rarely occurs unless both of the other two pathways are highly unlikely.

In some instances, however, predictions based on this model underestimate the total amount of energy released in the form of gamma rays; that is, nuclei appear to have more than enough energy to eject neutrons, but decay by gamma emission instead. This discrepancy is found by the energy of a nuclear angular momentum, and documentation and calculation of yrast levels for a given system may be used for analyzing such a situation.

The energy stored in the angular momentum of an atomic nucleus can also be responsible for the emission of larger-than-expected particles, such as alpha particles over single nucleons, because they can carry away angular momentum more effectively. This is not the only reason alpha particles are preferentially emitted, though; another reason is simply that alpha particles (He-4 nuclei) are energetically very stable in and of themselves.

== Yrast isomers ==
Sometimes there is a large gap between two yrast states. For example, the nucleus ^{95}Pd has a 21/2 state that lies below the lowest 19/2, 17/2, and 15/2 states. This state does not have enough energy to undergo strong particle decay, and because of the large spin difference, gamma decay from the 21/2 state to the 13/2 state below is very unlikely. The more likely decay option is beta decay, which forms an isomer with an unusually long half-life of 14 seconds.

An exceptional example is the J=9 state of tantalum-180, which is a very low-lying yrast state only 77 keV above the ground state. The ground state has J=1, which is too large a gap for gamma decay to occur. Alpha and beta decay are also suppressed, so strongly that the resulting isomer, tantalum-180m, is effectively stable for all practical purposes, and has never been observed to decay. Tantalum-180m is the only currently known yrast isomer to be observationally stable.

Some superheavy isotopes (such as copernicium-285) have longer-lived isomers with half-lives on the order of minutes. These may be yrasts, but the exact angular momentum and energy is often hard to determine for these nuclides.
