= Superheavy element =

Chemical elements with atomic numbers from 104 to 120

Superheavy elements, also known as transactinide elements, transactinides, or super-heavy elements, or superheavies for short, are the chemical elements with an atomic number of at least 104. The superheavy elements are those beyond the actinides in the periodic table; the last actinide is lawrencium (atomic number 103). By definition, superheavy elements are also transuranium elements, i.e., having atomic numbers greater than that of uranium (92). Depending on the definition of group 3 adopted by authors, lawrencium may also be included to complete the 6d series.

Glenn T. Seaborg first proposed the actinide concept, which led to the acceptance of the actinide series. He also proposed a transactinide series ranging from element 104 to 121 and a superactinide series approximately spanning elements 122 to 153 (though more recent work suggests the end of the superactinide series to occur at element 157 instead). The transactinide seaborgium was named in his honor.

Superheavies are radioactive and have only been obtained synthetically in laboratories. No macroscopic sample of any of these elements has ever been produced. Superheavies are all named after physicists and chemists or important locations involved in the synthesis of the elements.

IUPAC defines an element to exist if its lifetime is longer than 10^{−14} seconds, which is the time it takes for the atom to form an electron cloud.

The known superheavies form part of the 6d and 7p series in the periodic table. Except for rutherfordium and dubnium (and lawrencium if it is included), all known isotopes of superheavies have half-lives of minutes or less. The element naming controversy involved elements 102–109. Some of these elements thus used systematic names for many years after their discovery was confirmed. (Usually the systematic names are replaced with permanent names proposed by the discoverers relatively soon after a discovery has been confirmed.)

== Introduction ==
=== Synthesis of superheavy nuclei ===
A graphic depiction of a nuclear fusion reaction. Two nuclei fuse into one, emitting a neutron. Reactions that created new elements to this moment were similar, though varying numbers of neutrons – or alternatively charged particles – may be emitted instead.

A superheavy (Note: In nuclear physics, an element is called heavy if its atomic number is high; lead (element 82) is one example of such a heavy element. The term "superheavy elements" typically refers to elements with atomic number greater than 103 (although there are other definitions, such as atomic number greater than 100 or 112; sometimes, the term is presented an equivalent to the term "transactinide", which puts an upper limit before the beginning of the hypothetical superactinide series). Terms "heavy isotopes" (of a given element) and "heavy nuclei" mean what could be understood in the common language—isotopes of high mass (for the given element) and nuclei of high mass, respectively.) atomic nucleus is created in a nuclear reaction that combines two other nuclei of unequal size (Note: In 2009, a team at the JINR led by Oganessian published results of their attempt to create hassium in a symmetric ^{136}Xe + ^{136}Xe reaction. They failed to observe a single atom in such a reaction, putting the upper limit on the cross section, the measure of probability of a nuclear reaction, as 2.5 pb. In comparison, the reaction that resulted in hassium discovery, ^{208}Pb + ^{58}Fe, had a cross section of ~20 pb (more specifically, 19^{+19}_{-11} pb), as estimated by the discoverers.) into one; roughly, the more unequal the two nuclei in terms of mass, the greater the possibility that the two react. The material made of the heavier nuclei is made into a target, which is then bombarded by the beam of lighter nuclei. Two nuclei can only fuse into one if they are close enough to each other; normally, nuclei (all positively charged) repel each other due to electrostatic repulsion. The strong interaction can overcome this repulsion but only within a very short distance from a nucleus; beam nuclei are thus greatly accelerated in order to make such repulsion insignificant compared to the velocity of the beam nucleus. The energy applied to the beam nuclei to accelerate them can cause them to reach speeds as high as one-tenth of the speed of light. However, if too much energy is applied, the beam nucleus can fall apart.

Coming close enough alone is not enough for two nuclei to fuse: when two nuclei approach each other, they usually remain together for about 10^{−20} seconds and then part ways (not necessarily in the same composition as before the reaction) rather than form a single nucleus. This happens because during the attempted formation of a single nucleus, electrostatic repulsion tears apart the nucleus that is being formed. Each pair of a target and a beam is characterized by its cross section—the probability that fusion will occur if two nuclei approach one another expressed in terms of the transverse area that the incident particle must hit in order for the fusion to occur. (Note: The amount of energy applied to the beam particle to accelerate it can also influence the value of cross section. For example, in the ^{28}_{14}Si + ^{1}_{0}n → ^{28}_{13}Al + ^{1}_{1}p reaction, cross section changes smoothly from 370 mb at 12.3 MeV to 160 mb at 18.3 MeV, with a broad peak at 13.5 MeV with the maximum value of 380 mb.) This fusion may occur as a result of the quantum effect in which nuclei can tunnel through electrostatic repulsion. If the two nuclei can stay close past that phase, multiple nuclear interactions result in redistribution of energy and an energy equilibrium.

External videos
- Visualization of unsuccessful nuclear fusion, based on calculations from the Australian National University

The resulting merger is an excited state—termed a compound nucleus—and thus it is very unstable. To reach a more stable state, the temporary merger may fission without formation of a more stable nucleus. Alternatively, the compound nucleus may eject a few neutrons, which would carry away the excitation energy; if the latter is not sufficient for a neutron expulsion, the merger would produce a gamma ray. This happens in about 10^{−16} seconds after the initial nuclear collision and results in creation of a more stable nucleus. The definition by the IUPAC/IUPAP Joint Working Party (JWP) states that a chemical element can only be recognized as discovered if a nucleus of it exists for at least 10^{−14} seconds. This value was chosen as an estimate of how long it takes a nucleus to acquire electrons and thus display its chemical properties. (Note: This figure also marks the generally accepted upper limit for lifetime of a compound nucleus.)

=== Decay and detection ===
The beam passes through the target and reaches the next chamber, the separator; if a new nucleus is produced, it is carried with this beam. In the separator, the newly produced nucleus is separated from other nuclides (that of the original beam and any other reaction products) (Note: This separation is based on the resulting heavy nuclei moving past the target more slowly than the unreacted beam nuclei. The separator contains electric and magnetic fields whose effects on a moving particle cancel out for a specific velocity of a particle. Such separation can also be aided by a time-of-flight measurement and a recoil energy measurement; a combination of the two may allow estimation of the mass of the nucleus.) and transferred to a surface-barrier detector, which stops the nucleus. The exact location of the upcoming impact on the detector is marked; also marked are its energy and the time of the arrival. The transfer takes about 10^{−6} seconds; in order to be detected, the nucleus must survive this long. The nucleus is recorded again once its decay is registered, and the location, the energy, and the time of the decay are measured.

Stability of a nucleus is provided by the strong interaction. However, its range is very short; as nuclei become larger, its influence on the outermost nucleons (protons and neutrons) weakens. At the same time, the nucleus is being destabilised by electrostatic repulsion between its protons, with a force that reduces much less with linear size. Total binding energy provided by the strong interaction increases linearly with the number of nucleons, whereas electrostatic repulsion increases with the square of the atomic number, i.e. the latter grows faster and becomes increasingly important for heavy and superheavy nuclei. Superheavy nuclei are theoretically predicted and have so far been observed to predominantly decay via decay modes that are caused by such repulsion: alpha decay and spontaneous fission. (Note: Not all decay modes are caused by electrostatic repulsion. For example, beta decay is caused by the weak interaction.) Almost all alpha emitters have over 210 nucleons, and the lightest nuclide primarily undergoing spontaneous fission has 238. In both decay modes, nuclei are inhibited from decaying by corresponding energy barriers for each mode, but they can be tunneled through.

Scheme of an apparatus for creation of superheavy elements, based on the Dubna Gas-Filled Recoil Separator set up in the Flerov Laboratory of Nuclear Reactions in JINR. The trajectory within the detector and the beam focusing apparatus changes because of a dipole magnet in the former and quadrupole magnets in the latter.

Alpha particles are commonly produced in radioactive decays because the mass of an alpha particle per nucleon is small enough to leave some energy for the alpha particle to be used as kinetic energy to leave the nucleus. Spontaneous fission is caused by electrostatic repulsion tearing the nucleus apart and produces various nuclei in different instances of identical nuclei fissioning. As the atomic number increases, spontaneous fission rapidly becomes more important: spontaneous fission partial half-lives decrease by 23 orders of magnitude from uranium (element 92) to nobelium (element 102), and by 30 orders of magnitude from thorium (element 90) to fermium (element 100). The earlier liquid drop model thus suggested that spontaneous fission would occur nearly instantly due to disappearance of the fission barrier for nuclei with about 280 nucleons. The later nuclear shell model suggested that nuclei with about 300 nucleons would form an island of stability in which nuclei will be more resistant to spontaneous fission and will primarily undergo alpha decay with longer half-lives. Subsequent discoveries suggested that the predicted island might be further than originally anticipated; they also showed that nuclei intermediate between the long-lived actinides and the predicted island are deformed, and gain additional stability from shell effects. Experiments on lighter superheavy nuclei, as well as those closer to the expected island, have shown greater than previously anticipated stability against spontaneous fission, showing the importance of shell effects on nuclei. (Note: It was already known by the 1960s that ground states of nuclei differed in energy and shape as well as that certain magic numbers of nucleons corresponded to greater stability of a nucleus. However, it was assumed that there was no nuclear structure in superheavy nuclei as they were too deformed to form one.)

Alpha decays are registered by the emitted alpha particles, and the decay products are easy to determine before the actual decay; if such a decay or a series of consecutive decays produces a known nucleus, the original product of a reaction can be easily determined. (Note: Since mass of a nucleus is not measured directly but is rather calculated from that of another nucleus, such measurement is called indirect. Direct measurements are also possible, but for the most part they have remained unavailable for superheavy nuclei. The first direct measurement of mass of a superheavy nucleus was reported in 2018 at LBNL. Mass was determined from the location of a nucleus after the transfer (the location helps determine its trajectory, which is linked to the mass-to-charge ratio of the nucleus, since the transfer was done in presence of a magnet).) (That all decays within a decay chain were indeed related to each other is established by the location of these decays, which must be in the same place.) The known nucleus can be recognized by the specific characteristics of decay it undergoes such as decay energy (or more specifically, the kinetic energy of the emitted particle). (Note: If the decay occurred in a vacuum, then since total momentum of an isolated system before and after the decay must be preserved, the daughter nucleus would also receive a small velocity. The ratio of the two velocities, and accordingly the ratio of the kinetic energies, would thus be inverse to the ratio of the two masses. The decay energy equals the sum of the known kinetic energy of the alpha particle and that of the daughter nucleus (an exact fraction of the former). The calculations hold for an experiment as well, but the difference is that the nucleus does not move after the decay because it is tied to the detector.) Spontaneous fission, however, produces various nuclei as products, so the original nuclide cannot be determined from its daughters. (Note: Spontaneous fission was discovered by Soviet physicist Georgy Flerov, a leading scientist at JINR, and thus it was a "hobbyhorse" for the facility. In contrast, the LBL scientists believed fission information was not sufficient for a claim of synthesis of an element. They believed spontaneous fission had not been studied enough to use it for identification of a new element, since there was a difficulty of establishing that a compound nucleus had only ejected neutrons and not charged particles like protons or alpha particles. They thus preferred to link new isotopes to the already known ones by successive alpha decays.)

The information available to physicists aiming to synthesize a superheavy element is thus the information collected at the detectors: location, energy, and time of arrival of a particle to the detector, and those of its decay. The physicists analyze this data and seek to conclude that it was indeed caused by a new element and could not have been caused by a different nuclide than the one claimed. Often, provided data is insufficient for a conclusion that a new element was definitely created and there is no other explanation for the observed effects; errors in interpreting data have been made. (Note: For instance, element 102 was mistakenly identified in 1957 at the Nobel Institute of Physics in Stockholm, Stockholm County, Sweden. There were no earlier definitive claims of creation of this element, and the element was assigned a name by its Swedish, American, and British discoverers, nobelium. It was later shown that the identification was incorrect. The following year, RL was unable to reproduce the Swedish results and announced instead their synthesis of the element; that claim was also disproved later. JINR insisted that they were the first to create the element and suggested a name of their own for the new element, joliotium; the Soviet name was also not accepted (JINR later referred to the naming of the element 102 as "hasty"). This name was proposed to IUPAC in a written response to their ruling on priority of discovery claims of elements, signed 29 September 1992. The name "nobelium" remained unchanged on account of its widespread usage.)

== History ==
=== Early predictions ===
The heaviest element known at the end of the 19th century was uranium, with an atomic mass of about 240 (now known to be 238) amu. Accordingly, it was placed in the last row of the periodic table; this fueled speculation about the possible existence of elements heavier than uranium and why A = 240 seemed to be the limit. Following the discovery of the noble gases, beginning with argon in 1895, the possibility of heavier members of the group was considered. Danish chemist Julius Thomsen proposed in 1895 the existence of a sixth noble gas with Z = 86, A = 212 and a seventh with Z = 118, A = 292, the last closing a 32-element period containing thorium and uranium. In 1913, Swedish physicist Johannes Rydberg extended Thomsen's extrapolation of the periodic table to include even heavier elements with atomic numbers up to 460, but he did not believe that these superheavy elements existed or occurred in nature.

In 1914, German physicist Richard Swinne proposed that elements heavier than uranium, such as those around Z = 108, could be found in cosmic rays. He suggested that these elements may not necessarily have decreasing half-lives with increasing atomic number, leading to speculation about the possibility of some longer-lived elements at Z = 98–102 and Z = 108–110 (though separated by short-lived elements). Swinne published these predictions in 1926, believing that such elements might exist in Earth's core, iron meteorites, or the ice caps of Greenland where they had been locked up from their supposed cosmic origin.

=== Discoveries ===
Work performed from 1961 to 2013 at four laboratories – Lawrence Berkeley National Laboratory in the United States, the GSI Helmholtz Centre for Heavy Ion Research in Germany, RIKEN in Japan, and the Joint Institute for Nuclear Research (JINR) in the Soviet Union and later Russia — identified and confirmed the elements lawrencium through oganesson according to the criteria established by the IUPAC–IUPAP Transfermium Working Groups and subsequent Joint Working Parties.

The creation of lawrencium was first reported by the Lawrence Berkeley National Laboratory in 1961, although competing claims and questions concerning the interpretation of the experimental data led to a prolonged priority dispute with JINR researchers. IUPAC-IUPAP ultimately recognized the discovery in 1992.

During the following decades, Berkeley discovered the earliest transactinide elements, while GSI researchers in Darmstadt synthesized elements 107 through 112. RIKEN was later credited with the discovery of element 113, nihonium, becoming the first Asian institution to discover a chemical element. Subsequent experiments at JINR, carried out in collaboration with laboratories in the United States, led to the discovery of elements 114 through 118, culminating in the recognition of oganesson and the completion of the seventh period of the periodic table.

The next two elements, ununennium (Z = 119) and unbinilium (Z = 120), have not yet been synthesized. Their discovery would begin the eighth period of the periodic table.

=== List of elements ===
- 103 Lawrencium, Lr, for Ernest Lawrence; sometimes but not always included
- 104 Rutherfordium, Rf, for Ernest Rutherford
- 105 Dubnium, Db, for the town of Dubna, near Moscow
- 106 Seaborgium, Sg, for Glenn T. Seaborg
- 107 Bohrium, Bh, for Niels Bohr
- 108 Hassium, Hs, for Hassia (Hesse), location of Darmstadt
- 109 Meitnerium, Mt, for Lise Meitner
- 110 Darmstadtium, Ds, for Darmstadt
- 111 Roentgenium, Rg, for Wilhelm Röntgen
- 112 Copernicium, Cn, for Nicolaus Copernicus
- 113 Nihonium, Nh, for Nihon (Japan), location of the Riken institute
- 114 Flerovium, Fl, for Russian physicist Georgy Flyorov
- 115 Moscovium, Mc, for Moscow
- 116 Livermorium, Lv, for Lawrence Livermore National Laboratory
- 117 Tennessine, Ts, for Tennessee, location of Oak Ridge National Laboratory
- 118 Oganesson, Og, for Russian physicist Yuri Oganessian

== Characteristics ==
Due to their short half-lives (for example, the most stable known isotope of seaborgium has a half-life of 14 minutes, and half-lives decrease with increasing atomic number) and the low yield of the nuclear reactions that produce them, new methods have had to be created to determine their gas-phase and solution chemistry based on very small samples of a few atoms each. Relativistic effects become very important in this region of the periodic table, causing the filled 7s orbitals, empty 7p orbitals, and filling 6d orbitals to all contract inward toward the atomic nucleus. This causes a relativistic stabilization of the 7s electrons and makes the 7p orbitals accessible in low excitation states.

Elements 103 to 112, lawrencium to copernicium, form the 6d series of transition elements. Experimental evidence shows that elements 103–108 behave as expected for their position in the periodic table, as heavier homologs of lutetium through osmium. They are expected to have ionic radii between those of their 5d transition metal homologs and their actinide pseudohomologs: for example, Rf^{4+} is calculated to have ionic radius 76 pm, between the values for Hf^{4+} (71 pm) and Th^{4+} (94 pm). Their ions should also be less polarizable than those of their 5d homologs. Relativistic effects are expected to reach a maximum at the end of this series, at roentgenium (element 111) and copernicium (element 112). Nevertheless, many important properties of the transactinides are still not yet known experimentally, though theoretical calculations have been performed.

Elements 113 to 118, nihonium to oganesson, should form a 7p series, completing the seventh period in the periodic table. Their chemistry will be greatly influenced by the very strong relativistic stabilization of the 7s electrons and a strong spin–orbit coupling effect "tearing" the 7p subshell apart into two sections, one more stabilized (7p_{1/2}, holding two electrons) and one more destabilized (7p_{3/2}, holding four electrons). Lower oxidation states should be stabilized here, continuing group trends, as both the 7s and 7p_{1/2} electrons exhibit the inert-pair effect. These elements are expected to largely continue to follow group trends, though with relativistic effects playing an increasingly larger role. In particular, the large 7p splitting results in an effective shell closure at flerovium (element 114) and a hence much higher than expected chemical activity for oganesson (element 118).

The next two elements, 119 and 120, should form an 8s series and be an alkali and alkaline earth metal respectively. The 8s electrons are expected to be relativistically stabilized, so that the trend toward higher reactivity down these groups will reverse and the elements will behave more like their period 5 homologs, rubidium and strontium. The 7p_{3/2} orbital is still relativistically destabilized, potentially giving these elements larger ionic radii and perhaps even being able to participate chemically. In this region, the 8p electrons are also relativistically stabilized, resulting in a ground-state 8s^{2}8p^{1} valence electron configuration for element 121. Large changes are expected to occur in the subshell structure in going from element 120 to element 121: for example, the radius of the 5g orbitals should drop drastically, from 25 Bohr units in element 120 in the excited [Og] 5g^{1} 8s^{1} configuration to 0.8 Bohr units in element 121 in the excited [Og] 5g^{1} 7d^{1} 8s^{1} configuration, in a phenomenon called "radial collapse". Element 122 should add either a further 7d or a further 8p electron to element 121's electron configuration. Elements 121 and 122 should be similar to actinium and thorium respectively.

At element 121, the superactinide series is expected to begin, when the 8s electrons and the filling 8p_{1/2}, 7d_{3/2}, 6f_{5/2}, and 5g_{7/2} subshells determine the chemistry of these elements. Complete and accurate calculations are not available for elements beyond 123 because of the extreme complexity of the situation: the 5g, 6f, and 7d orbitals should have about the same energy level, and in the region of element 160 the 9s, 8p_{3/2}, and 9p_{1/2} orbitals should also be about equal in energy. This will cause the electron shells to mix so that the block concept no longer applies very well, and will also result in novel chemical properties that will make positioning these elements in a periodic table very difficult.

== Beyond superheavy elements ==
It has been suggested that elements beyond Z = 126 be called beyond superheavy elements. Other sources refer to elements around Z = 164 as hyperheavy elements. These two boundaries mark the existence of theorised islands of stability: sets of isotopes that have a "magic number" of protons and neutrons and are therefore more stable than surrounding nuclides.

== See also ==
- Bose–Einstein condensate (also known as Superatom)
- Island of stability
