= IUPAC/IUPAP Joint Working Party =

Chemical element naming group

The IUPAC/IUPAP Joint Working Party is a group convened periodically since 2012 by the International Union of Pure and Applied Chemistry (IUPAC) and the International Union of Pure and Applied Physics (IUPAP) to consider claims for discovery and naming of new chemical elements. It is sometimes called the Joint Working Party on Discovery of Elements. The working party's recommendations are voted on by the General Assembly of the IUPAP.
