= Georgy Flerov =

Soviet physicist (1913–1990)

- Георгий Флёров
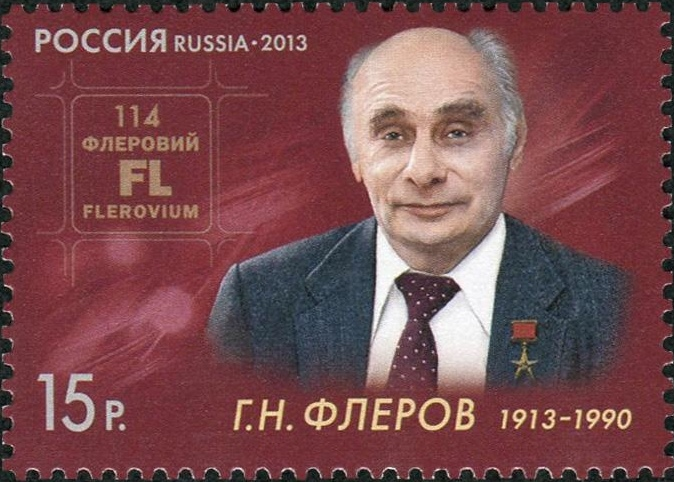
- Flerov on a 2013 Russian stamp
- Born: 2 March 1913; Rostov-on-Don, Russian Empire
- Died: 19 November 1990 (aged 77); Moscow, Soviet Union
- Resting place: Novodevichy Cemetery, Moscow
- Citizenship: Soviet Union
- Education: Leningrad Polytechnic Institute
- Known for: Discovery of spontaneous fission Soviet atomic bomb project
- Awards: Hero of Socialist Labor (1949)
- Scientific career
- Fields: Physics
- Workplaces: JINR and LFTI; USSR Academy of Science
- Notable students: Yuri Oganessian

Georgy Nikolayevich Flerov, also spelled Flyorov (Russian: Георгий Николаевич Флёров, IPA: [ɡʲɪˈorɡʲɪj nʲɪkɐˈlajɪvʲɪtɕ ˈflʲɵrəf]; 2 March 1913 – 19 November 1990), was a Soviet physicist who is known for his discovery of spontaneous fission and his important contribution towards crystallography and material science, for which, he was honored with many awards. In addition, he is also known for his letter directed to Joseph Stalin, during the midst of World War II, to start a program of nuclear weapons in the Soviet Union.

In 2012, element 114 was named flerovium after the research laboratory at the Joint Institute for Nuclear Research bearing his name.

== Biography ==
Flerov was born on 2 March 1913 in Rostov-on-Don in Russia. His grandfather was a priest in the Russian Orthodox Church—his mother was Jewish. After finishing schooling in 1929, he was trained as a mechanic and later as an electrician, first working as a technician at the Kirov Plant. In 1933–34, he was able to attend the Leningrad Polytechnic Institute (now known as the Peter the Great St. Petersburg Polytechnic University), and earned a specialist degree from the Polytechnic Institute in physics under Abram Ioffe's group in 1939. He found employment at the Ioffe Institute (then known as LFTI) and worked under Igor Kurchatov. Initially he worked with Mikhail Rusinov in fission applications in 1939 but discovered spontaneous fission in 1940 with Konstantin Petrzhak in 1940.

He is known for writing to Stalin in April 1942 as a lieutenant in the Soviet Air Forces and pointing out the conspicuous silence within the field of nuclear fission in the United States, the United Kingdom and Germany. Flerov's urgings to "build the uranium bomb without delay" eventually led to the development of the Soviet atomic bomb project.

In the 1970s, he claimed as his discovery two transition metal elements: seaborgium and bohrium.

He founded the Flyorov Laboratory of Nuclear Reactions (FLNR), one of the main laboratories of the Joint Institute for Nuclear Research in Dubna in 1957, and was director there until 1989. Also during this period, he chaired the Scientific Council of the Soviet Academy of Sciences.

== Honours and awards ==
- Hero of Socialist Labour (1949)
- Two Orders of Lenin (1949, 1983)
- Order of the October Revolution (1973)
- Order of the Red Banner of Labour, three times (1959, 1963, 1975)
- Order of the Patriotic War, 1st class (1985)
- Lenin Prize (1967)
- Stalin Prize, twice (1946, 1949)
- Marian Smoluchowski Medal (1974)
- USSR State Prize (1975)
- Honorary Citizen of Dubna
- The element flerovium (atomic number 114) named after him in 2012
