= Kevin Insik Hahn =

South Korean physicist (born 1962)

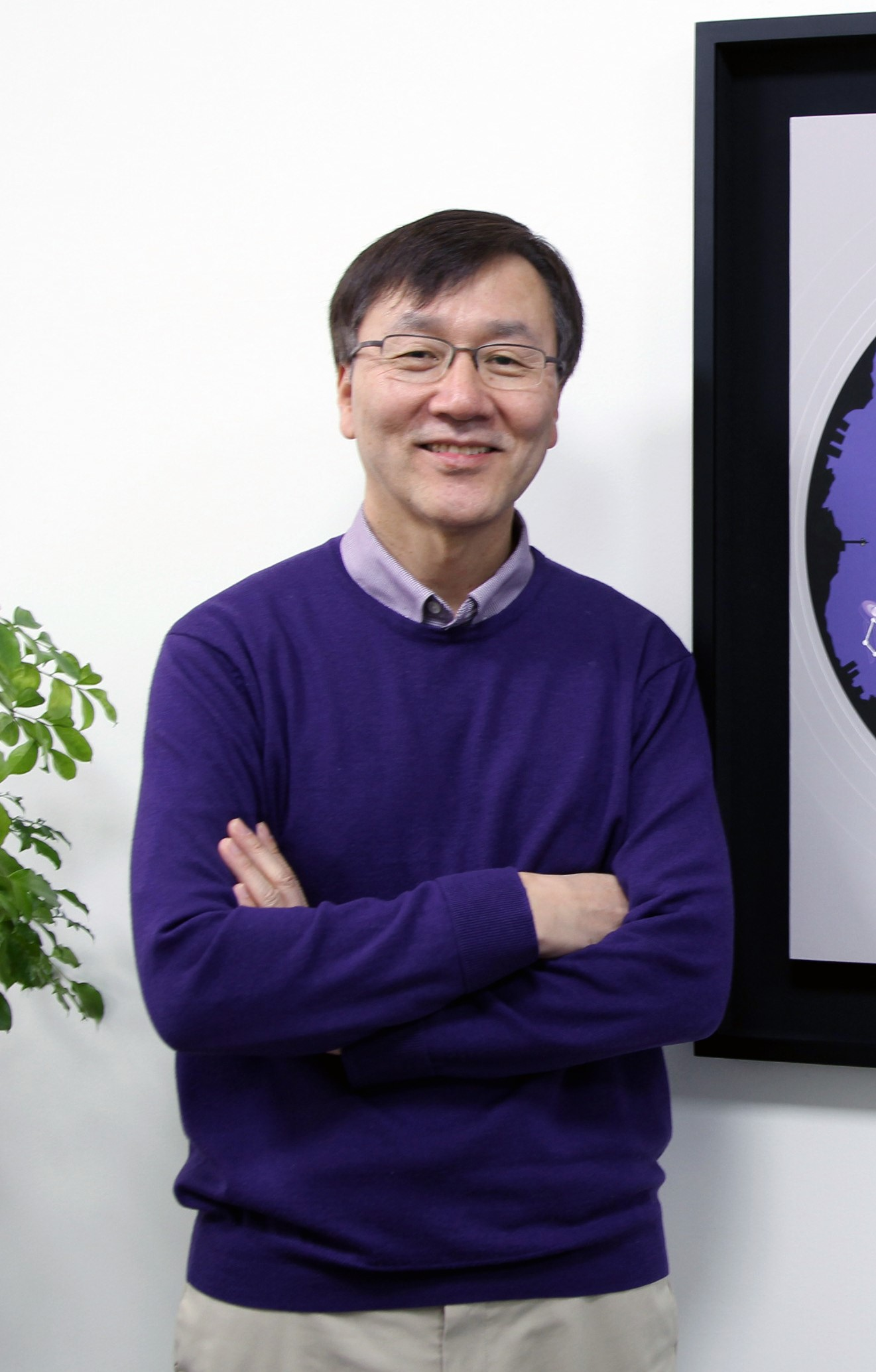
- Born: January 11, 1962; Gangwon Province, South Korea
- Education: UCLA, Yale University
- Scientific career
- Fields: Nuclear astrophysics, nuclear physics, rare decay experiments, science education
- Workplaces: Caltech, RIKEN, Ewha Womans University, University of Houston, Brookhaven National Laboratory, RISP, Institute for Basic Science
- Thesis: The ^{17}F(p,γ)^{18}Ne and ^{14}O(α,p)^{17}F Reaction Rates and the Structure of ^{18}Ne (1993)
- Doctoral advisor: Peter Parker

Korean name
- Hangul: 한인식
- Hanja: 韓仁植
- RR: Han Insik
- MR: Han Insik
- Website: Center for Exotic Nuclear Studies

Kevin Insik Hahn is a South Korean physicist who is an expert in the fields of nuclear physics and nuclear astrophysics. Since December 2019, he has been the director of the Center for Exotic Nuclear Studies at the Institute for Basic Science (IBS) in South Korea. He also holds an endowed professorship in the Department of Science Education at Ewha Womans University, where he has worked since 1999. In his research, he has worked on accelerator-based as well as non-accelerator-based experiments. His current research activities involve a number of accelerators around the world, including the RI Beam Factory (RIBF) at RIKEN, Relativistic Heavy Ion Collider (RHIC) at Brookhaven National Laboratory, and the soon-to-open Rare isotope Accelerator complex for ON-line experiment (RAON). During his tenure at Ewha Womans University, he promoted STEM/STEAM education by serving for multiple years as the director of the Advanced STEAM Teacher Education Center. He also wrote several physics textbooks for high school students and undergraduate students.

== Education ==
Hahn obtained a B.S. in physics from University of California, Los Angeles (UCLA) in 1984. He then enrolled in Yale University and graduated with a M.S. in physics in 1989 and a Ph.D. in nuclear astrophysics in 1993. His doctoral thesis was on the reaction rates of ^{17}F(p,γ)^{18}Ne and ^{14}O(α,p)^{17}F and was supervised by Peter Parker.

== Career ==
Hahn went to Caltech and worked for three years as a research fellow in the Kellogg Radiation Laboratory with Ralph Kavanagh. Relocating to Japan, he spent the next two years as a research fellow at RIKEN becoming an official RIKEN Fellow from 1996 to 1997. As a Fellow, he worked with Ishihara at the Radiation Laboratory at RIKEN and also worked closely with Motobayashi and Kubono. The next year he worked as a research professor in the University of Houston teaching an undergraduate course on electromagnetism and conducted hypernuclear experiments at Brookhaven National Laboratory and rare decay experiments. From 1999, he worked as a professor in the Department of Science Education, Ewha Womans University, Korea including as an invited chair professor. From 2014, he has worked as a visiting scholar with RAON and the IBS Center for Underground Physics where he worked with KIMS (dark matter search), AMoRE (double beta decay experiment), and the HPGe Array.

Working mainly on silicon detector for the PHENIX collaboration, he and collaborators found evidence of the quark–gluon plasma, which can be made in small-scale collision systems. Working with colleagues, he participated in experiments confirming atomic nuclei with 34 neutrons are more stable than expected. Earlier experiments theorized this but had been unable to confirm it.

In late 2019, Hahn became the founding director of the IBS Center for Exotic Nuclear Studies. Divided into four groups; experimental nuclear astrophysics, experimental nuclear structure, experimental nuclear reaction and theoretical nuclear physics, research of the center uses rare isotope beams from overseas RI accelerators and later the Rare Isotope Science Project's (RISP) RAON accelerator in Korea, specifically RISP's KOrea Broad acceptance Recoil spectrometer and Apparatus (KOBRA) with a focus on discovering rare isotopes and investigating the origins of heavy elements. His work will help direct collaborations among universities and research groups studying rare isotope accelerator sciences in South Korea.

== Awards and honors ==
- 2018: Outstanding faculty in research, Ewha Womans University
- 2017: Outstanding faculty in research, Ewha Womans University
- 2006: Outstanding faculty in research grant, Ewha Womans University
- 1996–1997: RIKEN Fellow

== Committee work ==
- 2019: International Advisory Committee for the 15th Symposium on Origin of Matter and Evolution of Galaxies (OMEG), Kyoto, Japan
- 2018–present: Board member of the RAON Users Association
- 2017: International Advisory Committee for the Symposium on Origin of Matter and Evolution of Galaxies (OMEG), Daejeon, Korea
- 2015–2016: Board member of the Korean Physical Society
- 2014–2018: Board member of Asian Nuclear Physics Association (ANPhA)
- 2013–present: Member of the RISP Scientific Program Advisory Committee
- 1993–present: Member, American Physical Society

== Selected publications ==
- Aidala, Christine; Apadula, Nicole J.; Hill, John C.; Hotvedt, Nels J.; Lajoie, John G.; et al. (PHENIX Collaboration) (10 December 2018). "Creation of quark–gluon plasma droplets with three distinct geometries". Nature Physics. 15 (3): 214–220. arXiv:1805.02973. doi:10.1038/s41567-018-0360-0. S2CID 195367932.
- S. Chen; J. Lee; P. Doornenbal; A. Obertelli; C. Barbieri; et al. (30 September 2019). "Quasifree Neutron Knockout from 54Ca Corroborates Arising N=34 Neutron Magic Number". Phys. Rev. Lett. 123 (14) 142501. Bibcode:2019PhRvL.123n2501C. doi:10.1103/PhysRevLett.123.142501. hdl:10261/204485. PMID 31702209. S2CID 207940982.
- A. Kim; N. H. Lee; M. H. Han; J. S. Yoo; K. I. Hahn; H. Yamaguchi; D. N. Binh; T. Hashimoto; S. Hayakawa; D. Kahl; T. Kawabata; Y. Kurihara; Y. Wakabayashi; S. Kubono; S. Choi; Y. K. Kwon; J. Y. Moon; H. S. Jung; C. S. Lee; T. Teranishi; S. Kato; T. Komatsubara; B. Guo; W. P. Liu; B. Wang; Y. Wang (1 September 2015). "Measurement of the 14O(a,p)17F cross section at Ec.m. = 2.1-5.3 MeV". Physical Review C. 92 (3) 035801. American Physical Society. doi:10.1103/PhysRevC.92.035801.
