= Kim Sun-kee =

South Korean physicist (born 1960)

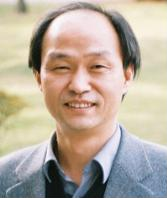
- Kim Sun-kee
- Born: May 20, 1960 (age 66); South Korea
- Education: Korea University
- Awards: 1991 SSC Fellow, TNRLC
- Scientific career
- Fields: Physics
- Workplaces: Seoul National University; Korea Invisible Mass Search; Rare Isotope Science Project, Institute for Basic Science
- Doctoral advisor: Kang Joo-sang

- Kim Sun-kee
- Hangul: 김선기
- Hanja: 金善基
- RR: Gim Seongi
- MR: Kim Sŏn'gi

Kim Sun-kee (Korean: 김선기; Hanja: 金善基; born May 20, 1960) is a South Korean physicist. He is professor in Seoul National University and director of the Korea Invisible Mass Search. He was the first director of the Rare Isotope Science Project within the Institute for Basic Science and is a member of the Korean Academy of Science and Technology.

== Education ==
- 1979−1983: BS, Korea University
- 1983−1985: MS, Korea University
- 1985−1988: Ph.D. Korea University

== Work ==
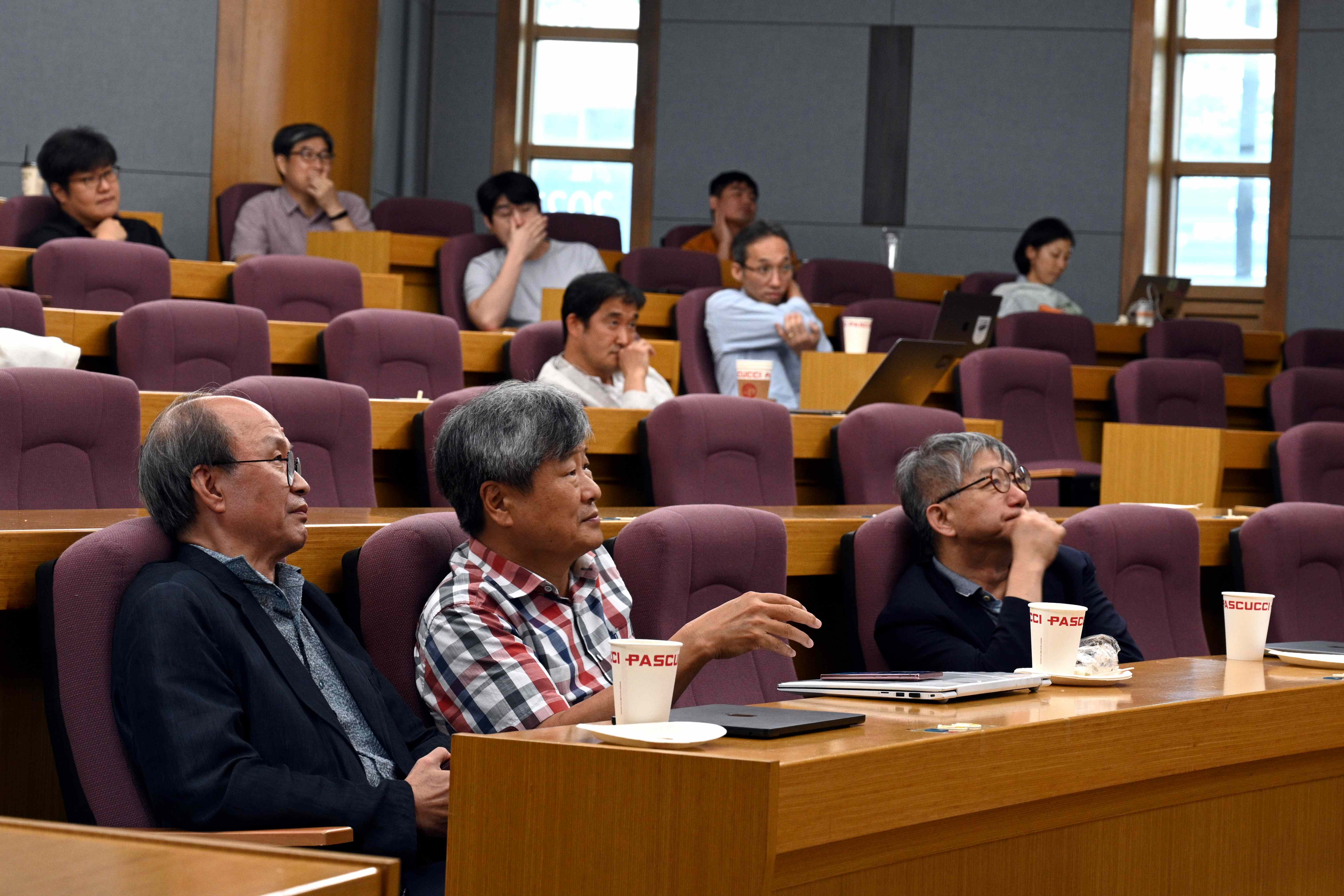
The three founders of Korea Invisible Mass Search; left to right Kim Sun-kee, Kim Hongjoo, and Kim Yeongduk.

Positions held

- 1988−1990: Research Associate, KEK, Japan
- 1990−1992: Senior Research Associate, Rutgers University
- 1992−1996: Assistant Professor, Seoul National University
- 1996−2002: Associate Professor, Seoul National University
- 2002−present: Professor, Seoul National University
- 2011−present: Director, Rare Isotope Science Project, Institute for Basic Science
- 1995−1995: Visiting Scientist, Fermi National Accelerator Laboratory
- 1999−1999: Visiting Scientist, KEK

Major research activities

- 1985−1996: AMY experiment, TRISTAN, KEK e+e- collider experiment
- 1990−1992: E799, Rare Kaon decay experiment, Fermilab
- 1994−1998: D0 experiment, TEVATRON, Fermilab
- 1994−2011: BELLE experiment, KEKB, KEK
- 1996−2000: ATIC, balloon borne experiment, NASA
- 2000−2011: Korea Invisible Mass Search (spokesperson), South Korea

Professional service activities

- 1992−1994: Korea SSC committee
- 1994−2001: Executive board, Belle Collaboration
- 1996−1998: Investigators Consultative Group between Korea-NASA
- 1998−2001: Organizing committee, World Wide Study on Physics and Detector at LC
- 2000−2006: Director of Dark Matter Research Center
- 2001−2002: Advisory committee, Proton Therapy Center at National Cancer Center
- 2005−2009: Chair, Association of Korean High Energy Physicists
- 2006−2012: Committee for the Promotion of Korea-CERN Collaboration, MEST
- 2008−present: International Detector Advisory Group of ILC
- 2009−2010: Chair, Particle Physics Division, Korean Physical Society
- 2011−2011: Steering Committee for Heavy Ion Accelerator, MEST
- 2012−2014: National Committee for Fusion Research, MEST
- 2012−2014: R&D Policy Advisory Committee, National Fusion Research Institute

== Awards ==
- 1991: SSC Fellow, TNRLC
- 2006: Koshiba Prize, Foundation for High Energy Accelerator Science, Japan
- 2008: Scientist of the Month, Ministry of Education, Science and Technology of South Korea
- 2008: SNU Award for Excellent Research

== Selected list of publications ==
=== Physics ===
1. Lee, M. J.; Aihara, H.; Arinstein, K.; Aulchenko, V.; Aushev, T.; et al. (Belle Collaboration) (2010-06-21). "Measurement of the branching fractions and the invariant mass distributions for τ^{−}→h^{−}h^{+}h^{−}ν_{τ} decays". Physical Review D. 81 (11) 113007. arXiv:1001.0083. doi:10.1103/physrevd.81.113007. ISSN 1550-7998. S2CID 119252822.
2. Lee, S. E.; Miyabayashi, K.; Aihara, H.; Aushev, T.; Aziz, T.; et al. (Belle Collaboration) (2008-04-01). "Improved measurement of time-dependentCPviolation in B^{0}→J/ψπ^{0} decays". Physical Review D. 77 (7): 071101(R). arXiv:0708.0304. Bibcode:2008PhRvD..77g1101L. doi:10.1103/physrevd.77.071101. ISSN 1550-7998. S2CID 118296523.
3. Lee, H. S.; Bhang, H. C.; Choi, J. H.; Dao, H.; Hahn, I. S.; et al. (KIMS collaboration) (2007-08-28). "Limits on Interactions between Weakly Interacting Massive Particles and Nucleons Obtained with CsI(Tl) Crystal Detectors". Physical Review Letters. 99 (9) 091301. arXiv:0704.0423. Bibcode:2007PhRvL..99i1301L. doi:10.1103/physrevlett.99.091301. ISSN 0031-9007. PMID 17930998. S2CID 13091713.
4. Lee, H.S.; Bhang, H.; Choi, J.H.; Hahn, I.S.; He, D.; et al. (2006). "First limit on WIMP cross section with low background CsI(Tℓ) crystal detector". Physics Letters B. 633 (2–3): 201–208. arXiv:astro-ph/0509080. Bibcode:2006PhLB..633..201K. doi:10.1016/j.physletb.2005.12.035. ISSN 0370-2693.
5. Yang, Heyoung; Nakao, M.; Abe, K.; Abe, K.; Aihara, H.; et al. (Belle Collaboration) (2005-03-24). "Observation of B^{+}→K_{1}(1270)^{+}γ". Physical Review Letters. 94 (11) 111802. arXiv:hep-ex/0412039. Bibcode:2005PhRvL..94k1802Y. doi:10.1103/physrevlett.94.111802. ISSN 0031-9007. PMID 15903847. S2CID 12761910.
6. Lee, S. H.; Suzuki, K.; Abe, K.; Abe, K.; Abe, T.; et al. (Belle Collaboration) (2003-12-24). "Evidence for B^{0}→π^{0}π^{0}". Physical Review Letters. 91 (26) 261801. arXiv:hep-ex/0308040. Bibcode:2003PhRvL..91z1801L. doi:10.1103/physrevlett.91.261801. ISSN 0031-9007. PMID 14754039. S2CID 119356264.
7. Abe, K.; Abe, R.; Abe, T.; Adachi, I.; et al. (2002). "Determination of |V_{cb}| using the semileptonic decay B̅^{0}→D^{∗+}e^{−}ν̅". Physics Letters B. 526 (3–4): 247–257. arXiv:hep-ex/0111060. doi:10.1016/s0370-2693(01)01476-9. ISSN 0370-2693. S2CID 119417559.
8. Abe, K.; Abe, R.; Adachi, I.; Ahn, Byoung Sup; et al. (Belle Collaboration) (2001-08-14). "Observation of LargeCPViolation in the NeutralBMeson System". Physical Review Letters. 87 (9) 091802. arXiv:hep-ex/0107061. Bibcode:2001PhRvL..87i1802A. doi:10.1103/physrevlett.87.091802. ISSN 0031-9007. PMID 11531561. S2CID 3197654.
9. Abe, K.; Adachi, I.; Ahn, Byoung Sup; Aihara, H.; et al. (Belle Collaboration) (2001-09-04). "Measurement of inclusive production of neutral pions from Υ(4S)decays". Physical Review D. 64 (7) 072001. arXiv:hep-ex/0103041. Bibcode:2001PhRvD..64g2001A. doi:10.1103/physrevd.64.072001. ISSN 0556-2821.
10. Abbott, B.; Abolins, M.; Abramov, V.; Acharya, B. S.; Adams, D. L.; et al. (D0 Collaboration) (2000-07-10). "Spin Correlation in tt̅ Production from pp̅ Collisions at √s=1.8 TeV". Physical Review Letters. 85 (2). American Physical Society (APS): 256–261. arXiv:hep-ex/0002058. doi:10.1103/physrevlett.85.256. hdl:10211.3/194434. ISSN 0031-9007. PMID 10991257. S2CID 115451067.
11. Abachi, S.; Abbott, B.; Abolins, M.; Acharya, B. S.; Adam, I.; et al. (D0 Collaboration) (1995-04-03). "Observation of the Top Quark". Physical Review Letters. 74 (14): 2632–2637. arXiv:hep-ex/9503003. Bibcode:1995PhRvL..74.2632A. doi:10.1103/physrevlett.74.2632. ISSN 0031-9007. PMID 10057979. S2CID 42826202.
12. Ahn, H.S.; Kim, H.J.; Kim, S.K.; Kang, J.S.; Kim, D.Y.; et al. (1998). "An experimental study of the process e^{+}e^{−}→e^{+}e^{−}μ^{+}μ^{−}". Physics Letters B. 440 (1–2). Elsevier BV: 179–188. doi:10.1016/s0370-2693(98)01204-0. ISSN 0370-2693.
13. Krolak, P.; Briere, R.A.; Cheu, E.; Harris, D.A.; McFarland, K.S.; et al. (1994). "A limit on the lepton-family number violating process π^{0}→μ^{±}e^{∓}". Physics Letters B. 320 (3–4). Elsevier BV: 407–410. Bibcode:1994PhLB..320..407K. doi:10.1016/0370-2693(94)90678-5. ISSN 0370-2693.
14. Kim, S.K.; Kim, H.J.; Kang, J.S.; Lee, M.H.; Myung, S.S.; et al. (AMY Collaboration) (1989). "Search for the substructure of leptons in high energy QED processes at tristan". Physics Letters B. 223 (3–4). Elsevier BV: 476–484. Bibcode:1989PhLB..223..476K. doi:10.1016/0370-2693(89)91636-5. ISSN 0370-2693.

=== Instrumentation ===
1. Lee, H.S.; Bhang, H.; Hahn, I.S.; Hwang, M.J.; Kim, H.J.; et al. (2007). "Development of low-background CsI(T) crystals for WIMP search". Nuclear Instruments and Methods in Physics Research Section A: Accelerators, Spectrometers, Detectors and Associated Equipment. 571 (3). Elsevier BV: 644–650. doi:10.1016/j.nima.2006.10.325. ISSN 0168-9002.
2. Hwang, M.J.; Kwon, Y.J.; Kim, H.J.; Kwak, J.W.; Kim, S.C.; et al. (2007). "Development of tin-loaded liquid scintillator for the double beta decay experiment". Nuclear Instruments and Methods in Physics Research Section A: Accelerators, Spectrometers, Detectors and Associated Equipment. 570 (3). Elsevier BV: 454–458. Bibcode:2007NIMPA.570..454H. doi:10.1016/j.nima.2006.10.100. ISSN 0168-9002.
3. Belogurov, S.; Kornoukhov, V.; Annenkov, A.; Borisevich, A.; Fedorov, A.; et al. (2005). "CaMoO_{4} scintillation crystal for the search of ^{100}Mo double beta decay". IEEE Transactions on Nuclear Science. 52 (4). Institute of Electrical and Electronics Engineers (IEEE): 1131–1135. doi:10.1109/tns.2005.852678. ISSN 0018-9499. S2CID 23548027.
4. Kim, Y.D.; Hahn, I.S.; Hwang, M.J.; Jin, Li; Kang, W.G.; et al. (2005). "Inhibition of ^{137}Cs contamination in cesium iodide". Nuclear Instruments and Methods in Physics Research Section A: Accelerators, Spectrometers, Detectors and Associated Equipment. 552 (3). Elsevier BV: 456–462. doi:10.1016/j.nima.2005.06.080. ISSN 0168-9002.
5. Ganel, O.; Adams, J.H.; Ahn, H.S.; Ampe, J.; Bashindzhagyan, G.; et al. (2005). "Beam tests of the balloon-borne ATIC experiment". Nuclear Instruments and Methods in Physics Research Section A: Accelerators, Spectrometers, Detectors and Associated Equipment. 552 (3). Elsevier BV: 409–419. Bibcode:2005NIMPA.552..409G. doi:10.1016/j.nima.2005.06.081. hdl:11858/00-001M-0000-0014-F962-C. ISSN 0168-9002.
6. Kim, H.J; Hahn, I.S; Hwang, M.J; Jain, R.K; Kang, U.K; et al. (2004). "Measurement of the neutron flux in the CPL underground laboratory and simulation studies of neutron shielding for WIMP searches". Astroparticle Physics. 20 (5). Elsevier BV: 549–557. Bibcode:2004APh....20..549K. doi:10.1016/j.astropartphys.2003.09.001. ISSN 0927-6505.
7. Kim, T.Y; Cho, I.S; Choi, D.H; Choi, J.M; Hahn, I.S; et al. (2003). "Study of the internal background of CsI(Tℓ) crystal detectors for dark matter search". Nuclear Instruments and Methods in Physics Research Section A: Accelerators, Spectrometers, Detectors and Associated Equipment. 500 (1–3). Elsevier BV: 337–344. Bibcode:2003NIMPA.500..337K. doi:10.1016/s0168-9002(03)00346-2. ISSN 0168-9002.
8. Kim, H.J; Ahn, H.J; Kim, S.K; Won, E; Kim, T.Y; Kim, Y.D; Lee, M.H; Chai, J.S; Ha, J.H (2001). "Test of CsI (Tℓ) crystals for the dark matter search". Nuclear Instruments and Methods in Physics Research Section A: Accelerators, Spectrometers, Detectors and Associated Equipment. 457 (3). Elsevier BV: 471–475. arXiv:physics/9910044. Bibcode:2001NIMPA.457..471K. doi:10.1016/s0168-9002(00)00796-8. ISSN 0168-9002.
9. Kim, H.J; Kim, S.K; Lee, S.H; Hur, T.W; Kim, C.H; et al. (2001). "A fast programmable trigger for isolated cluster counting in the BELLE experiment". Nuclear Instruments and Methods in Physics Research Section A: Accelerators, Spectrometers, Detectors and Associated Equipment. 457 (3). Elsevier BV: 634–639. arXiv:physics/9911050. Bibcode:2001NIMPA.457..634K. doi:10.1016/s0168-9002(00)00778-6. ISSN 0168-9002. S2CID 18938280.
10. Ohshima, Y.; Ahn, H.S.; Aoki, M.; Awa, S.; Fukushima, M.; et al. (1996). "Beam test of the CsI(Tl) calorimeter for the BELLE detector at the KEK-B factory". Nuclear Instruments and Methods in Physics Research Section A: Accelerators, Spectrometers, Detectors and Associated Equipment. 380 (3). Elsevier BV: 517–523. Bibcode:1996NIMPA.380..517O. doi:10.1016/0168-9002(96)00706-1. ISSN 0168-9002.
11. Tesarek, R.J.; Gilman, R.; Kumbartski, G.; Lee, M.H.; Rutt, P.; et al. (1994). "Performance of a diamond-tungsten sampling calorimeter". Nuclear Instruments and Methods in Physics Research Section A: Accelerators, Spectrometers, Detectors and Associated Equipment. 349 (1). Elsevier BV: 96–105. Bibcode:1994NIMPA.349...96T. doi:10.1016/0168-9002(94)90612-2. ISSN 0168-9002.
12. Franklin, M.; Fry, A.; Gan, K.K.; Han, S.; Kagan, H.; et al. (1992). "Development of diamond radiation detectors for SSC and LHC". Nuclear Instruments and Methods in Physics Research Section A: Accelerators, Spectrometers, Detectors and Associated Equipment. 315 (1–3). Elsevier BV: 39–42. Bibcode:1992NIMPA.315...39F. doi:10.1016/0168-9002(92)90677-v. ISSN 0168-9002.
