= Aidala =

Aidala is a surname. Notable people with the surname include:

- Christine Aidala (fl. 1999), American physicist
- Katherine Aidala (fl. 2001), American physicist
- Tom Aidala (1933–2016), American architect
