= Facility for Antiproton and Ion Research =

International accelerator project in Darmstadt, Germany

Coordinates: 49°55′53″N 8°40′45″E

Facility for Antiproton and Ion Research (FAIR)

- Abbreviation: FAIR
- Formation: 2010
- Location(s): Planckstraße 1; 64291 Darmstadt, Germany
- Scientific Managing Director: Thomas Nilsson
- Administrative Managing Director: Katharina Stummeyer
- Technical Managing Director: Jörg Blaurock
- Website: fair-center.eu

The Facility for Antiproton and Ion Research (FAIR) is an international accelerator facility under construction which will use antiprotons and ions to perform research in the fields of: nuclear, hadron and particle physics, atomic and anti-matter physics, high density plasma physics, and applications in condensed matter physics, biology and the bio-medical sciences. It is situated in Darmstadt in Germany.

FAIR will be based upon an expansion of the GSI Helmholtz Centre for Heavy Ion Research, the details of which have been laid out in the FAIR Baseline Technical Report 2006. On October 4, 2010 the Facility for Antiproton and Ion Research in Europe limited liability company (German GmbH), abbreviated as FAIR GmbH, was founded which coordinates the construction of the new accelerators and experiments.

The construction begun in the summer of 2017. Commissioning was planned for 2025. The original budget had been estimated at 1262 million euro (2005 price level), in 2018 the German Federal Court of Auditors stated that the cost of FAIR had increased to at least 1669 million euro (2005 prices), in 2019 a further report by the Federal Court of Auditors quoted results from a review board that an additional 850 million euro (2019 prices) would be needed to finish building the facility. In 2022, the start of operations was postponed to 2027 due to the effects of the Russian invasion of Ukraine. On 5 February 2026, a major fire damaged equipment around UNILAC, the linear accelerator required for FAIR, although the FAIR construction site itself was unaffected.

== FAIR science case ==
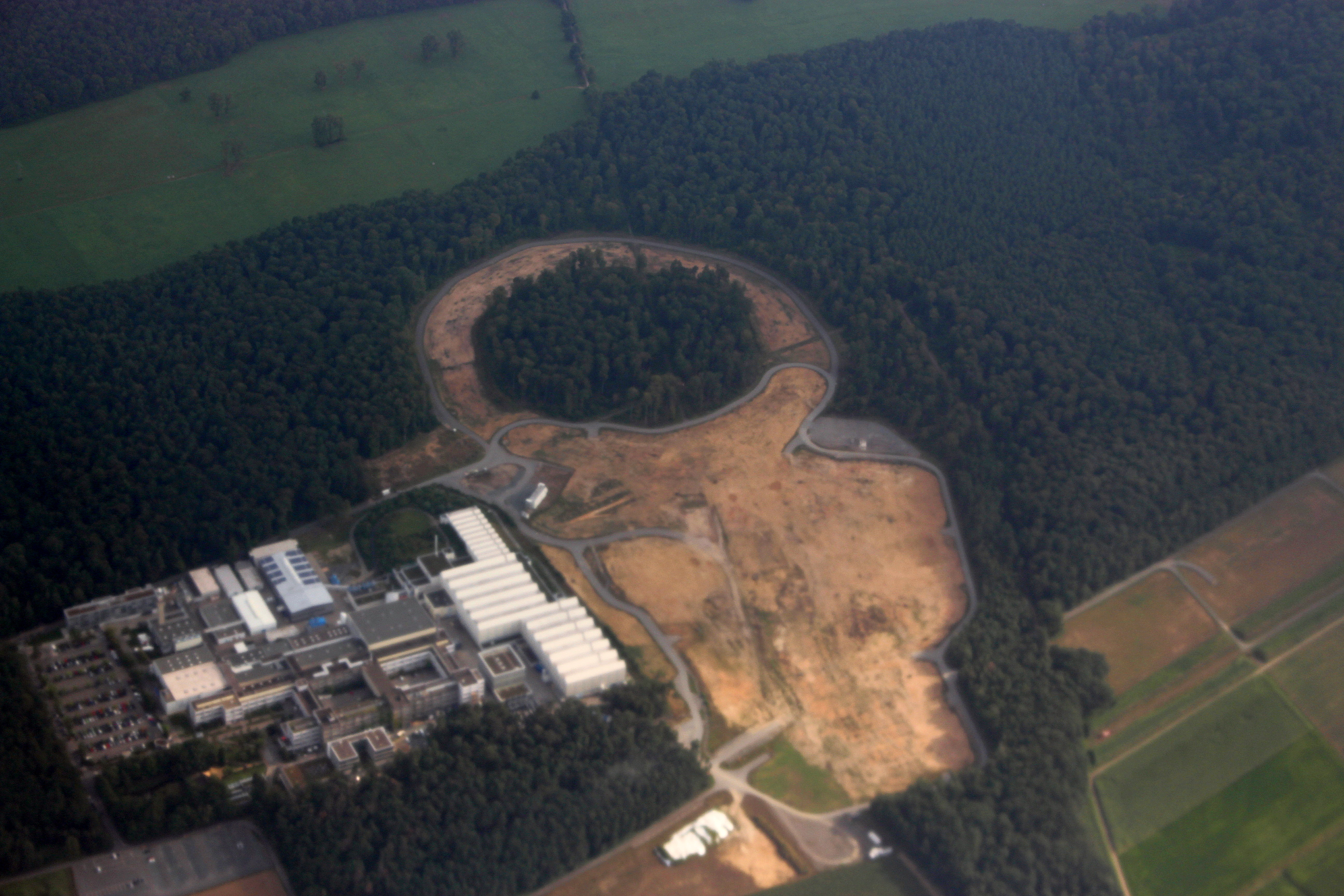
Aerial view on the FAIR construction site

The four scientific pillars of FAIR are:

- Atomic, Plasma Physics and Applications – APPA,
- Compressed Baryonic Matter – CBM,
- Nuclear Structure, Astrophysics and Reactions – NUSTAR,
- antiProton ANnihilation at DArmstadt – PANDA.

Those are described on the web pages of FAIR (see Research Overview and User Pages and links therein).

== FAIR accelerators ==
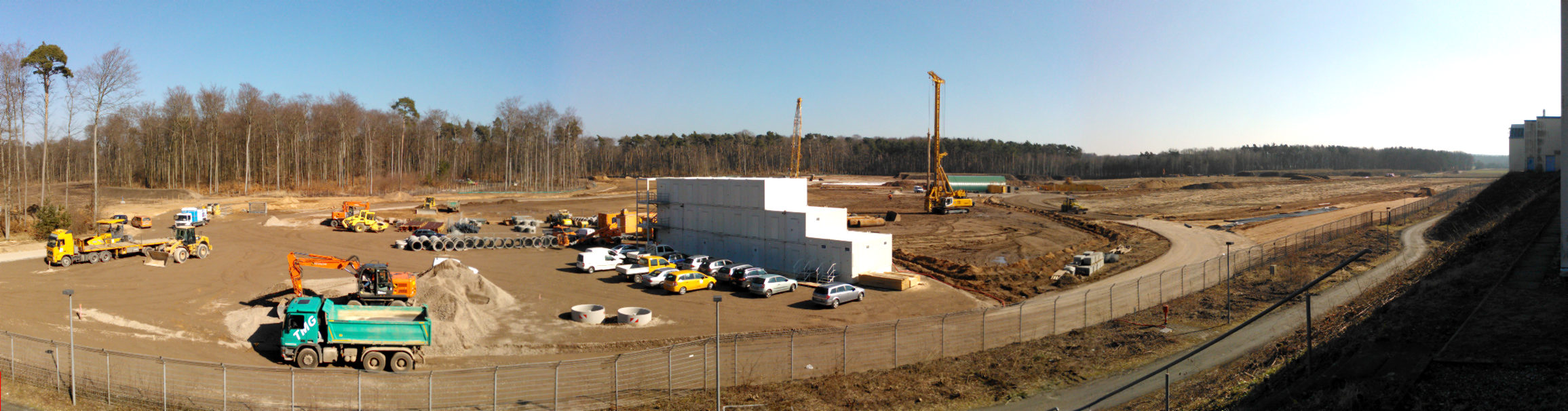
The FAIR construction area from the far east of the GSI ground (spring 2013). On the left, the tree free circle, will give room for the future heavy ion synchrotron SIS100, middle after the container housing two rotary drilling machines (each 100 tons "light") for the approximately 1400 piles, each max 40m deep and appr. 1.2m in diameter, right of the image the place for the future other accelerators and experimental areas.

Beams of protons will be prepared in the proton linear accelerator, p-LINAC, while heavy ions will be prepared in the UNILAC. Both of them will be fed into the SIS18. From there they will be directed into SIS100 (and SIS300 if applicable). Protons will be used either to produce antiproton beams by directing them on a dedicated production target or directly used for experiments within APPA. These antiprotons will be captured and cooled in the Collector Ring, CR (and RESR when available) before being injected into HESR, where they will be utilised within the PANDA experiment. High energetic heavy ions will either be used directly for studies with the CBM or APPA experiments or to produce unstable ion beams. The latter will be produced in the Rare Isotope Production Target and filtered the Super-FRS, where the NUSTAR experiments will take place.

== FAIR partner ==
=== Countries ===
Roughly 3,000 scientists from more than 50 countries are already working on the planning of the experiment and accelerator facilities. This project is realised by partners from Finland, France, Germany, India, Poland, Romania, Russia, Slovenia and Sweden that have signed an international treaty, the FAIR Convention, which formally entered into force in March 2014. The UK joined in 2013 as its first associate member. In 2018 the Czech Republic joined as an aspirant partner. Further countries, like Italy, are in negotiations.

=== Institutions ===
FAIR has also formed a strategic partnership with the Technische Universität Darmstadt, which is located in the same city as FAIR.

== See also ==
- GSI Helmholtz Centre for Heavy Ion Research
- PANDA experiment
- Facility for Rare Isotope Beams
- On-Line Isotope Mass Separator
- RAON
