= RIBF =

RIBF may refer to:

- Radioactive Isotope Beam Factory, a multistage particle accelerator complex in Japan
- Riyadh International Book Fair, an annual book fair in Saudi Arabia
