= Deborah Harris =

Deborah Harris may refer to:

- Deborah A. Harris, American physicist
- Deborah Turner Harris, American fantasy author
