= PANDA experiment =

Particle physics experiment

The PANDA experiment is a planned particle physics experiment at the Facility for Antiproton and Ion Research in Darmstadt. PANDA is an acronym of antiProton ANnihilation at DArmstadt.

PANDA will use proton–antiproton annihilation to study strong interaction physics at medium energy including hadron spectroscopy, search for exotic hadrons, hadrons in media, nucleon structure and exotic nuclei.

A more detailed description of the experiment is available at the scholarpedia.

== Antiproton Beam ==
A proton beam will be provided by the existing GSI facility and will be further accelerated by FAIR's SIS100 ring accelerator up to 30 GeV. By the beam hitting the antiproton production target, antiprotons with a momentum of around 3 GeV/c will be produced and can be collected and pre-cooled in the Collector Ring (CR). Afterwards the antiprotons will be injected into the High Energy Storage Ring (HESR). This race track shaped storage ring will host the P̄ANDA experiment. The antiprotons can be cooled using stochastic and later also electron cooling and afterwards slowed down or further accelerated to momenta from p = 1.5 GeV/c up to p = 15 GeV/c. There are two operation modes of the HESR. In the high-resolution mode a momentum resolution of $\frac{\Delta p}{p}=5\cdot10^{-5}$ and a luminosity of $\mathcal{L}=1.6\cdot10^{31}\mathrm{cm} ^{-2}s^{-1}$ can be achieved. In the high luminosity mode the momentum resolution will be $\frac{\Delta p}{p}=10^{-4}$ and the luminosity $\mathcal{L}=1.6\cdot10^{32}\mathrm{cm} ^{-2}s^{-1}$.

== The Spectrometer ==
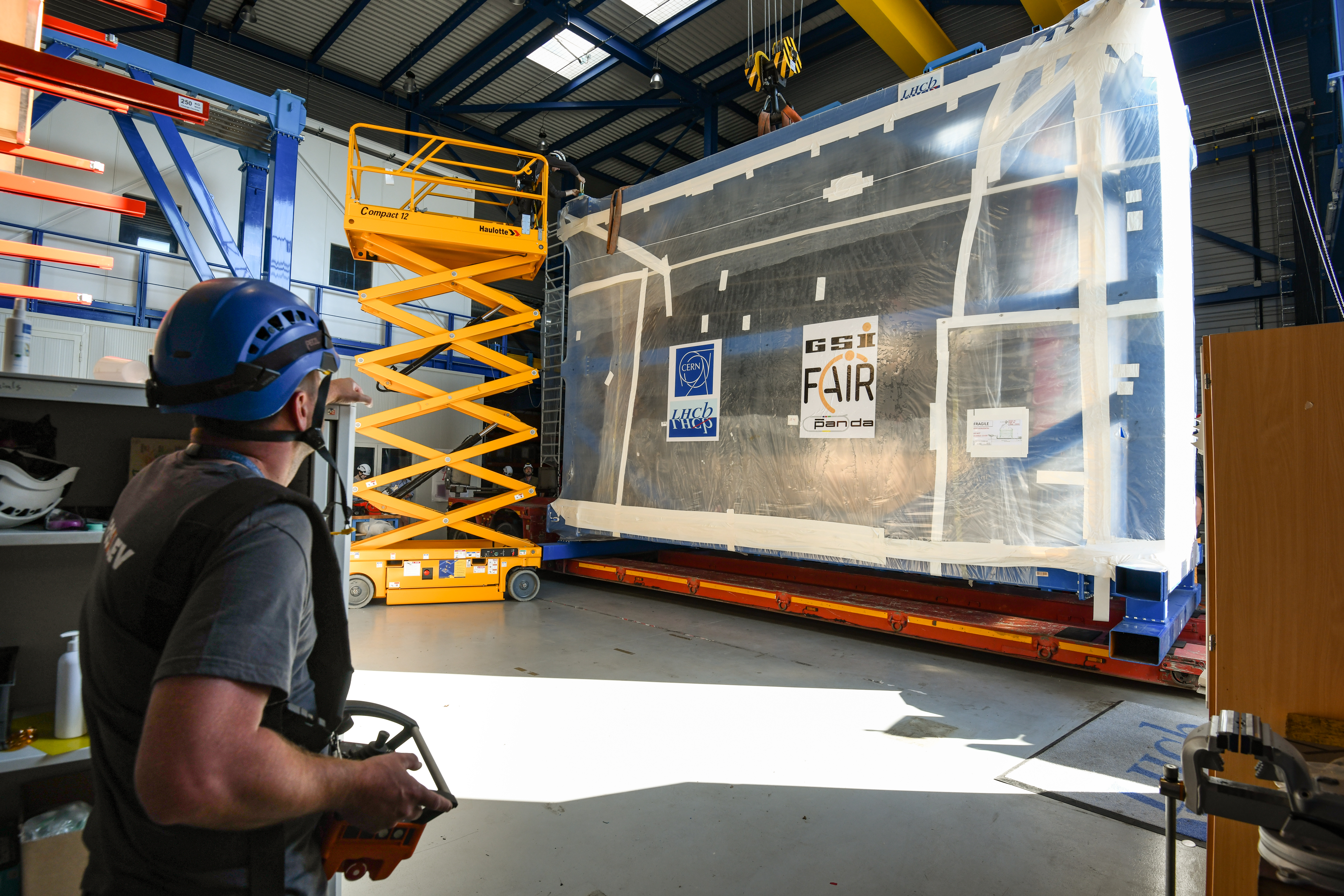
LHCb's outer tracker goes to GSI's PANDA experiment

The P̄ANDA detector consists of a Target Spectrometer surrounding the target area and a Forward Spectrometer to detect particles going into the very forward direction. This guarantees an almost 4π acceptance and a good momentum resolution.

The PANDA experiment will use the Outer Tracker from the LHCb experiment at the Large Hadron Collider (LHC) at CERN.

== See also ==
- GSI Helmholtz Centre for Heavy Ion Research
- Facility for Antiproton and Ion Research
- Facility for Rare Isotope Beams
- On-Line Isotope Mass Separator
- RAON
