= RISP =

RISP may stand for:

- Rhode Island State Police
- Runner In Scoring Position, a baseball statistic indicating batting average with runners in scoring position
- Recurrent Isolated Sleep Paralysis, a chronic form of sleep paralysis
- Rare Isotope Science Project, the research center overseeing the Rare isotope Accelerator complex for ON-line experiment particle accelerator
