= Koshiba Prize =

Academic award of Japan

- Native name: 小柴賞
- Description: "Achievements in the development of detector technology in the experimental sciences using accelerators"
- Country: Japan
- Presented by: Foundation for High Energy Accelerator Science (FAS)
- First award: 2003
- Website: https://www.heas.jp/award/fasprizes_eng.html

Koshiba Prize (小柴賞, Koshibashō) is an academic prize meant to honor "individuals or a small group of people who have demonstrated outstanding originality and internationally acclaimed achievements in the development of detector technology in the experimental sciences using accelerators." The award was established in 2003 to honor the work of Nobel Laureate Masatoshi Koshiba. Koshiba Prize winners must be under the age of 50, are selected annually and receive a certificate and ¥300,000. The award has been given exclusively to Japanese citizens until 2006, when it was awarded to Kim Sun-kee from Korea.

== Laureates ==
Year	Laureate	Institution	Citation
2003	Kunio Inoue; Fumihiko Suetsugu; Junpei Shirai	Tohoku University	Development of a large-capacity liquid scintillator detector for observing reactor antineutrino deficit phenomena
2004	Suyama Motohiro; Junji Haba	Hamamatsu Photonics; High Energy Accelerator Research Organization	Development of high-speed, high-sensitivity pixel photosensors
2005	Tanaka Shuji; Kim Sun-kee	High Energy Accelerator Research Organization; Seoul National University	Development, mass production and quality control of the ATLAS experiment muon trigger chamber Development of the Csl(TI) detector for dark matter search
2006	Satoshi Mihara	University of Tokyo	Development and construction of a large liquid xenon detector for the μ←eγ decay search experiment (MEG) at PSI
2007	Ryosuke Ito	High Energy Accelerator Research Organization	Development of a large-scale, high-speed data acquisition system for high-brightness electron-positron collision experiments
2008	Abe Toshinori; Katsuhiko Kawai	University of Tokyo; Hamamatsu Photonics	Development of large-aperture hybrid photodetectors
2009	Wataru Otani	University of Tokyo	Design and construction of the positron spectrometer magnet "COBRA"
2010	Shoji Uno	High Energy Accelerator Research Organization	Development of neutron and X-ray imaging device using micropattern gas detector
2011	-	-	-
2012	Tomohisa Uchida	High Energy Accelerator Research Organization	Research and development of a high-speed data acquisition system using a hardware-based communication control device
2013	-	-	-
2014	Nishiguchi So	High Energy Accelerator Research Organization	Development of an extremely low mass wire track detector for muon rare decay experiments
2015	Kenichi Sato; Terumasa Nagano; Shogo Kamakura; Ryuta Yamada	Hamamatsu Photonics	Improvement of Multi-Pixel Photon Counter (MPPC)
2016	Kenji Inami	Kobe University	Development of New Particle Identification Detector “TOP Counter
2017	Takaki Hatsui; Kenji Kojima	Institute of Physical and Chemical Research; High Energy Accelerator Research Organization	Development of wide dynamic range X-ray image sensor with SOI technology Development and application of high multiplicity positron detector Kalliope system
2017	Kenji Kojima	Institute of Materials Structure Science，High Energy Accelerator Research Organization	Development and application of high multiplicity positron detector Kalliope system
2018	-	-	-
2019	Masahiro Kotani; Terunori Kawai	Hamamatsu Photonics	Development of Box & Line type 20 inch photomultiplier tube for Hyper-Kamiokande
2020	-	-	-
2021	Mitsuhiro Nakamura; Toshiyuki Nakano	Institute of Materials and Systems for Sustainability; Nagoya University	Innovation on nuclear emulsion method for various experiments
2022	Masato Takita	University of Tokyo	Establishment of the sub-PeV gamma ray astronomy by an air shower detector array with a water Cherenkov muon detector
2022	Takashi Kameshima	Japan Synchrotron Radiation Research Institute	Development of quasi-diffraction-limited resolution X-ray imaging detector equipped with diffusion-free transparent scintillator
2023	Koji Miwa	Tohoku University	Development of the experimental method for hyperon-proton scattering using recoil proton detector system (CATCH)
2024	Hiroyuki Sekiya	Institute for Cosmic Ray Research, University of Tokyo	Development of Supernova Neutrino Detection Technology at Super-Kamiokande
2024	Shinji Okada; Shinya Yamada; Tadashi Hasimoto; Takuma Okumura	Chubu University; Rikkyo University; Institute of Physical and Chemical Research; Tokyo Metropolitan University	Advancing precision X-ray spectroscopy of exotic atoms using cryogenic detectors

== See also ==
- Nishina Memorial Prize
