= GSI anomaly =

Experimental facilities at GSI Helmholtz

One of the experimental facilities at the German laboratory GSI Helmholtz Centre for Heavy Ion Research in Darmstadt is an Experimental Storage Ring (ESR) with electron cooling in which large numbers of highly charged radioactive ions can be stored for extended periods of time. This facility provides the means to make precise measurements of their decay modes. The absence of most or all of the electrons in the ions simplifies theoretical treatments of their influence on the decay. Also, such a high degree of ionization is typical in stellar environments where such decays play an important role in nucleosynthesis.

In 2007 an ESR experiment reported the observation of unexpected modulation in time of the rate of electron capture decays of highly ionized heavy atoms — ^{140}Pr^{58+}, which have a lifetime of 3.39 min. Such findings were soon repeated by the same group, and were extended to include the decay of ^{142}Pm^{60+} (lifetime 40.5 s). The oscillations in decay rate had time periods near 7 s and amplitudes of about 20%. Such a phenomenon had not been previously observed, and was difficult to understand. The experimental group considered it very improbable that the appearance of the phenomenon is due to a technical artefact because they report that their detection technique provides—during the whole observation time—complete and uninterrupted information on the status of each stored ion.

As this type of weak decay involves the production of an electron neutrino, attempts at the time were made to relate the observed oscillations to neutrino oscillations, but this proposal was highly controversial.

In 2013, a similar experimental group at the ESR, now called the Two-Body-Weak-Decays Collaboration, reported further observations of the phenomenon with measurements on ^{142}Pm^{60+} with much higher precision in period and amplitude. The same period was observed, but the amplitude was only about half of that previously seen.

Moreover, a follow-up high-statistics study (2019) did not observe any time modulation, indicating the observed anomaly was purely statistical, with no physical origin.
