= Hans Joachim Specht =

German physicist and professor (1936–2024)

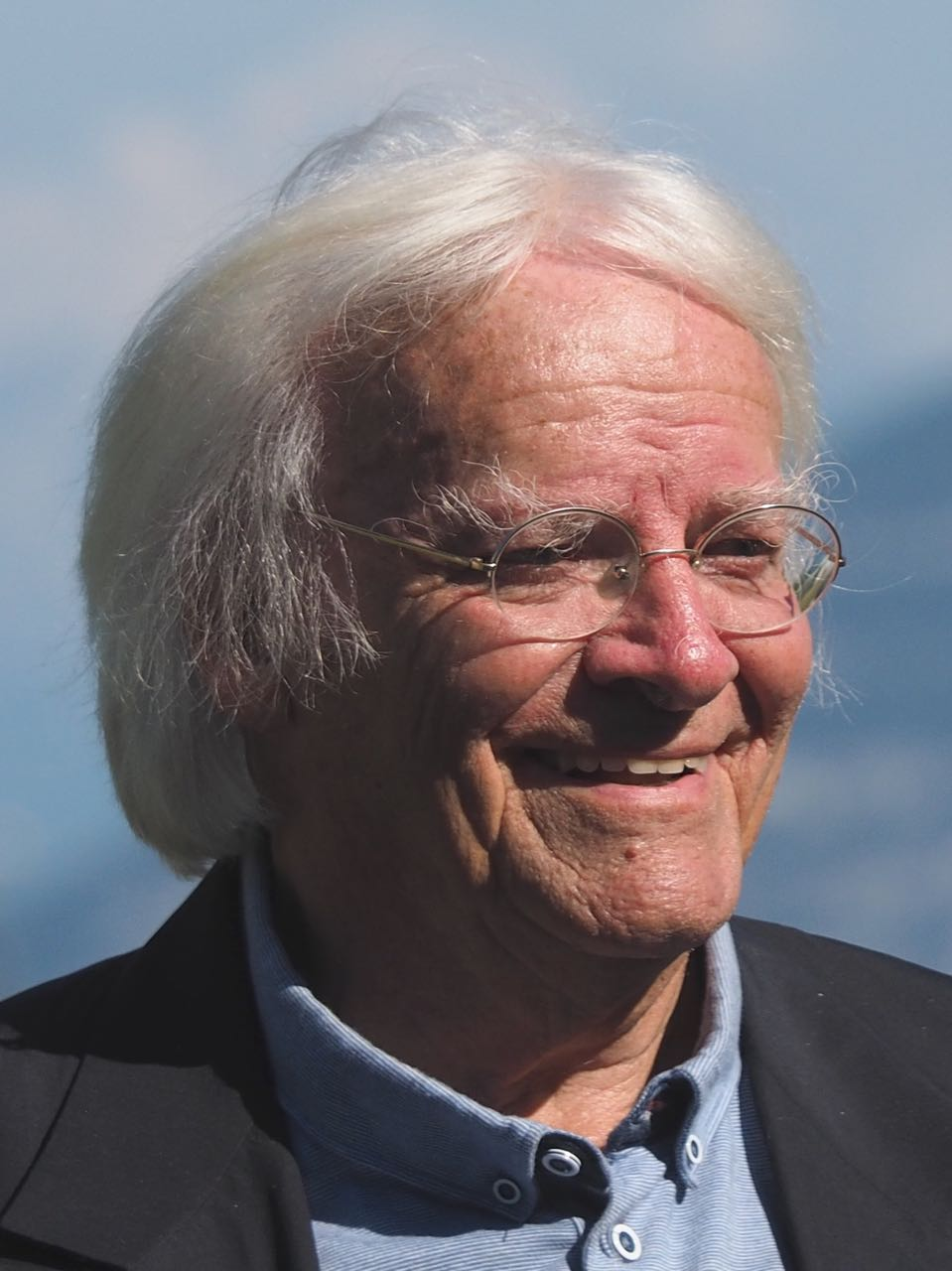

Hans Joachim Specht (6 June 1936 – 20 May 2024) was a German experimental particle and nuclear physicist and university professor at the Heidelberg University.

== Biography ==
Born in Unna, Specht attended the Gymnasium in Kamen and studied physics from 1956 to 1962 at LMU Munich, TU Munich, and ETH Zurich. He received his diploma in 1962 from TU Munich, followed by his doctorate summa cum laude in 1964, with Heinz Maier-Leibnitz as his mentor. His diploma and doctoral research was based on atomic physics experiments at the Forschungsreaktor Muenchen (FRM). Studying x-rays emitted in low energy heavy-ion collisions he opened the field of quasi-molecules. Specht’s next scientific focus shifted to nuclear fission and the shape of the fission barrier. As a postdoc with a NRC Fellowship at the AECL Nuclear Physics Laboratories in Chalk River, Canada, he introduced novel gas-filled detectors and identified vibrational states in the second minimum of the double-humped fission barrier. In 1969, Specht returned to Munich as an assistant at LMU Munich, where he made his habilitation in 1970 and was promoted to associate professor. Working at the joint accelerator facility of LMU Munich and TU Munich, Specht made a landmark discovery in 1972: he showed that fission isomers are strongly deformed nuclear states, providing the first experimental proof of shape isomerism in nuclei. This has been described as the most significant advancement in the nuclear shell model since introducing spin–orbit coupling. This discovery brought him international recognition and many academic offers, but he chose to continue his research in Heidelberg.

In 1973, Specht became a full professor at the Heidelberg University. He initially conducted research at the Max Planck Institute for Nuclear Physics in Heidelberg and GSI Helmholtz Centre for Heavy Ion Research in Darmstadt. By the early 1980s, his focus had shifted to the study of quark-gluon plasma formation in high-energy heavy-ion collisions at CERN. This transition to high-energy nuclear physics was encouraged by physicist William J. Willis. Specht was a member of the experiment R807/808 at the Intersecting Storage Rings (ISR), the spokesperson of a first generation ultra-relativistic heavy-ion experiment NA34-2/HELIOS, the founder and spokesperson of NA45/CERES, and, since 2003, a member of NA60 at the Super Proton Synchrotron (SPS), all while building a strong heavy-ion research group at Heidelberg University. He spent sabbatical years at CERN in 1983/84, 1990/91, and 2003/2004. In 1996, he was Chairman of the International Conference on Quark Matter held in Heidelberg. Specht also played a key role in shaping the ALICE experiment, contributing to the conceptual design of a heavy-ion detector at the Large Hadron Collider (LHC), and securing institutional support from Germany for the project.

From 1992 to 1999, Specht was the Scientific Director of GSI in Darmstadt. Here he initiated the use of ion beams for tumor therapy and oversaw the first patient treatments conducted on the grounds of the laboratory itself, in collaboration with the Radiology Clinic of the University and the German Cancer Research Center in Heidelberg. This paved the way for the clinical facility Heidelberger Ionenstrahl-Therapiezentrum (HIT) in Heidelberg, which went into operation in 2009.

Specht also worked together with Hans Guenter Dosch and others in interdisciplinary research on the physics and neurophysiology of the early processing of central musical quantities in the brain, like tone pitch and tone spectrum. Specht had played the piano since childhood.

In 1999, Specht and Dosch were invited as Loeb Lecturers at Harvard University. In the same year Specht received the Werner-Heisenberg-Medaille of the Alexander von Humboldt Foundation. In 2000, he became a member of the Heidelberg Academy of Sciences and Humanities.

In 2004, Specht became professor emeritus.

Specht died on 20 May 2024, at the age of 87.

In July 2025, an open-access book titled "Hans Joachim Specht — Scientist and Visionary" was published by Springer Nature. The book includes a foreword by Carlo Rubbia and features contributions from nearly 30 colleagues and collaborators, framing Specht’s biography (in his own words). It is available through the Springer website.

== Publications ==
- Nuclear Fission. Rev. Mod. Phys. 46, 1974, p. 773–787 (Online).
- Spectroscopic Properties of Fission Isomers., with V. Metag et al., Phys. Reports 65, 1980, p. 1–41 (Online).
- Reaktionen zwischen schweren Atomkernen – gegenwärtige und künftige Entwicklungen. Physikalische Blätter, Vol. 37, 1981, no. 7, p. 199 (Online).
- Quark Matter: Proceedings of the Sixth International Conference on Ultra-Relativistic Nucleus-Nucleus Collisions — Quark Matter 1987, Nordkirchen, FRG, 24–28 August 1987., edited by H. Satz, H. J. Specht, and R. Stock, Springer, 2012. ISBN 978-3-642-83524-7 (Online). Originally published as Zeitschrift für Physik C – Particles and Fields, Vol. 38 (1–2), 1988. ISSN 0170-9739.
- Gute Physik mit vorhandenen Geräten machen. Physikalische Blätter, Vol. 49, 1993, p. 46–48 (Online).
- NA60: In Hot Pursuit of Thermal Dileptons., with S. Damjanovic and R. Shahoyan, CERN Courier 11/2009, p. 31–34 (Online).
