= Dutasan =

Mountain in Donghae, South Korea

Highest point
- Elevation: 1,352.7 m (4,438 ft)
- Coordinates: 37.2600°N 129.1000°E

Geography
- Location: South Korea

Korean name
- Hangul: 두타산
- Hanja: 頭陀山
- RR: Dutasan
- MR: Tut'asan

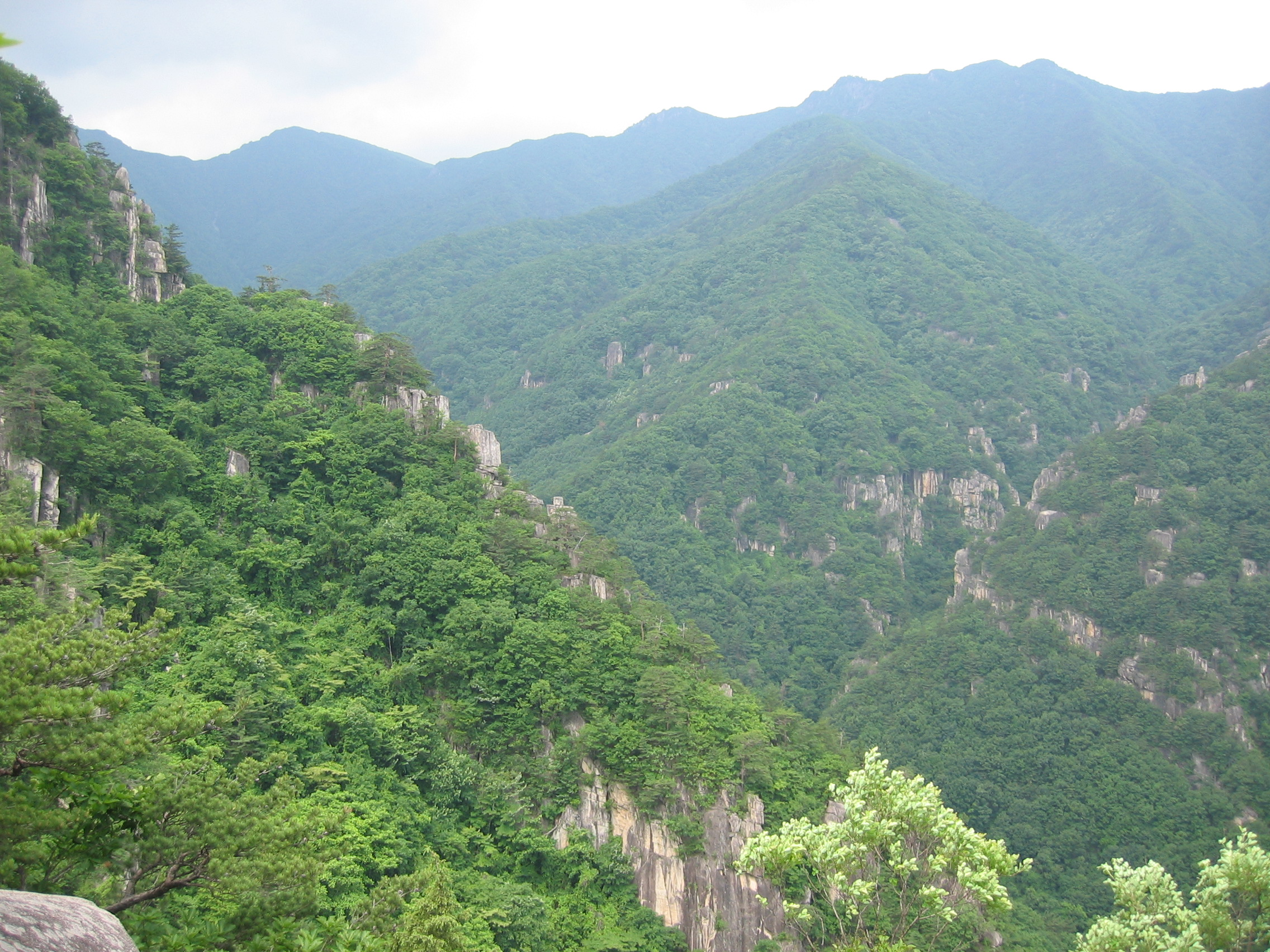

Dutasan (Korean: 두타산) is a mountain in Donghae, Gangwon Province, South Korea. It has an elevation of 1,352.7 m (4,438 ft). Dutasan was one of two sites selected for possible location of Yemilab around 2016. Yemisan was eventually selected.

== See also ==
- List of mountains in Korea
