= Yemilab =

Physics laboratory in South Korea

- 예미랩
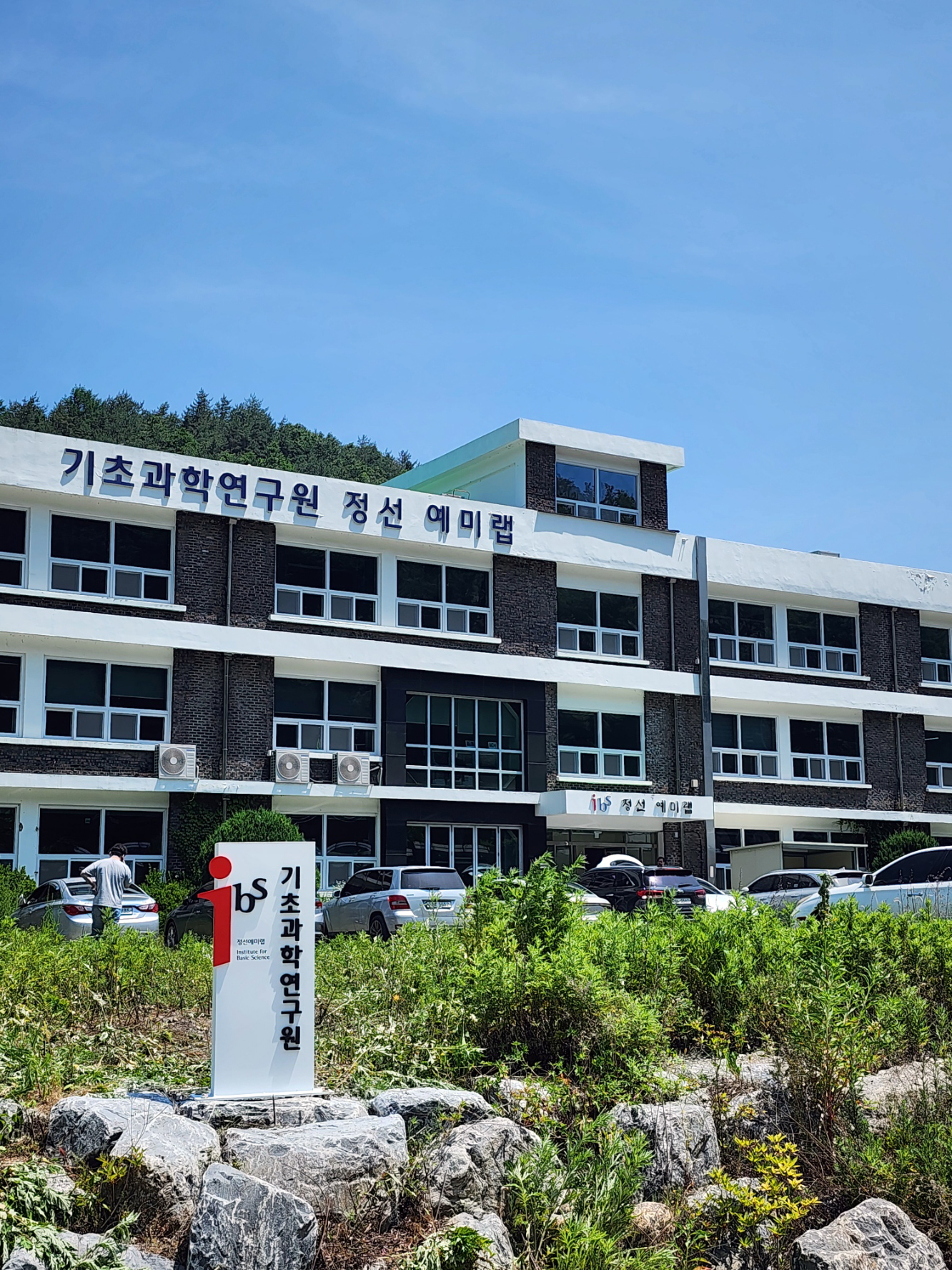
- Formation: 2022
- Type: Governmental organisation
- Headquarters: Daejeon, South Korea
- Location: 211 Hambaek-ro, Sindong-eup, Jeongseon-gun, Gangwon-do, South Korea
- Coordinates: 37.2102°N 128.6638°E
- Director: Kim Yeongduk (ko)
- Budget: 31 billion KRW

Korean name
- Hangul: 예미랩
- Hanja: 禮美랩
- RR: Yemiraep
- MR: Yemiraep

Yemilab (Korean: 예미랩), initially called the Astroparticle Research Facility (Korean: 우주입자연구시설), is a subterranean dark matter research facility searching for weakly interacting massive particles and neutrinoless double beta decay and sterile neutrinos. The facility is 1,000 meters under the mountain Yemisan and encased in limestone which corresponds to 2700 meter water equivalent. It has a dedicated experimental area of 3,000 m^{2} making it the sixth largest at time of its opening in 2022. There are 17 separate experimental spaces for relocated equipment from the Yangyang Underground Laboratory (Y2L) along with experimental equipment from various domestic universities and institutes. Yemilab is 400 meters deeper and provides 10 times more space than the Yangyang Underground Laboratory. An addition 6,200 m^{3} cylindrical pit has been prepared in order to accommodate future experiments.

== Timeline and location ==
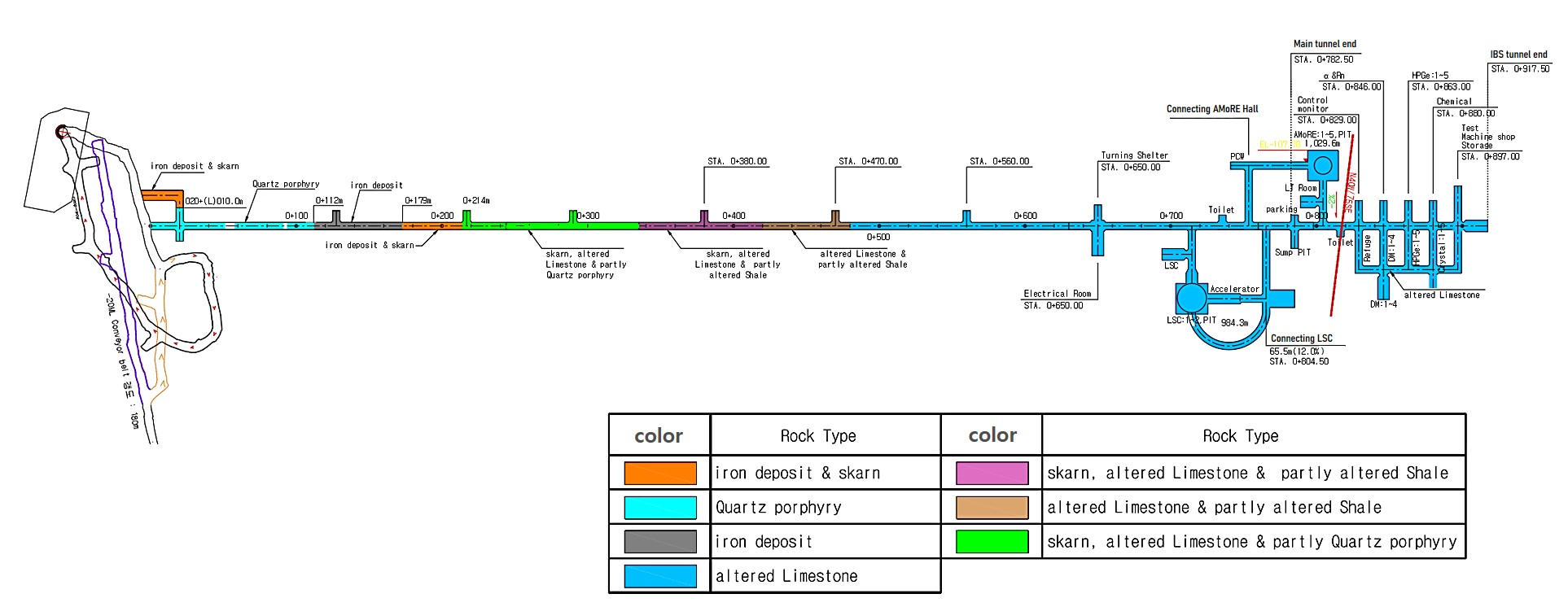
Tunnel map of the Yemilab complex.

From its establishment in 2013, Center for Underground Physics (CUP) of the Institute for Basic Science had been planning the creation of a deep underground laboratory. Approximately three years later, the search was narrowed to sites under mountains Yemisan and Dutasan both located in Gangwon Province, South Korea. As Mt. Yemi was already hosting the nation's only operating iron ore mine; owned by SM Handuk Iron Mine Co., Ltd.; permitting was a non-issue, environmental concerns were minimized, and costs were roughly halved compared to Mt. Duta as an existing 627 m long shaft could be utilized. Both sites offered five times the muon mitigation (or reduction) of Yangyang Underground Laboratory. A 35-year contract was signed between the Institute for Basic Science and the owners of the mine.

Initial funding was secured and construction began in September 2017. The first stage of construction included installation of the man cage and digging of the tunnel and was completion in 2018 and 2020, respectively. The second stage was completed in August 2022 and included the 6,200 m^{3} Large Scintillation Counter, AMoRE Hall which is the second largest space, other spaces for detectors, and support facilities. The New Austrian tunneling method was used for excavation. A majority of rock in the experimental area is composed of limestone with what appeared to be some metamorphic and quartz veins. The total volume of excavation is approximately 65,000 m^{3}. Laboratory facilities are located 700 meters away from active mining. By 2022, construction had cost 32 billion KRW ($22 million).

In 2023, various interior enhancements were completed and then experimental equipment started to be relocated into Yemilab with a completion date of end of 2025.

The ground office is the repurposed former Hambaek Middle and High School located 1.6 km from Yemi Station on the Taebaek Line east of Seoul. The second shaft of the Handuk Mine, which is used to access Yemilab, is a further 2.3 km from the ground office.

== Experiments ==
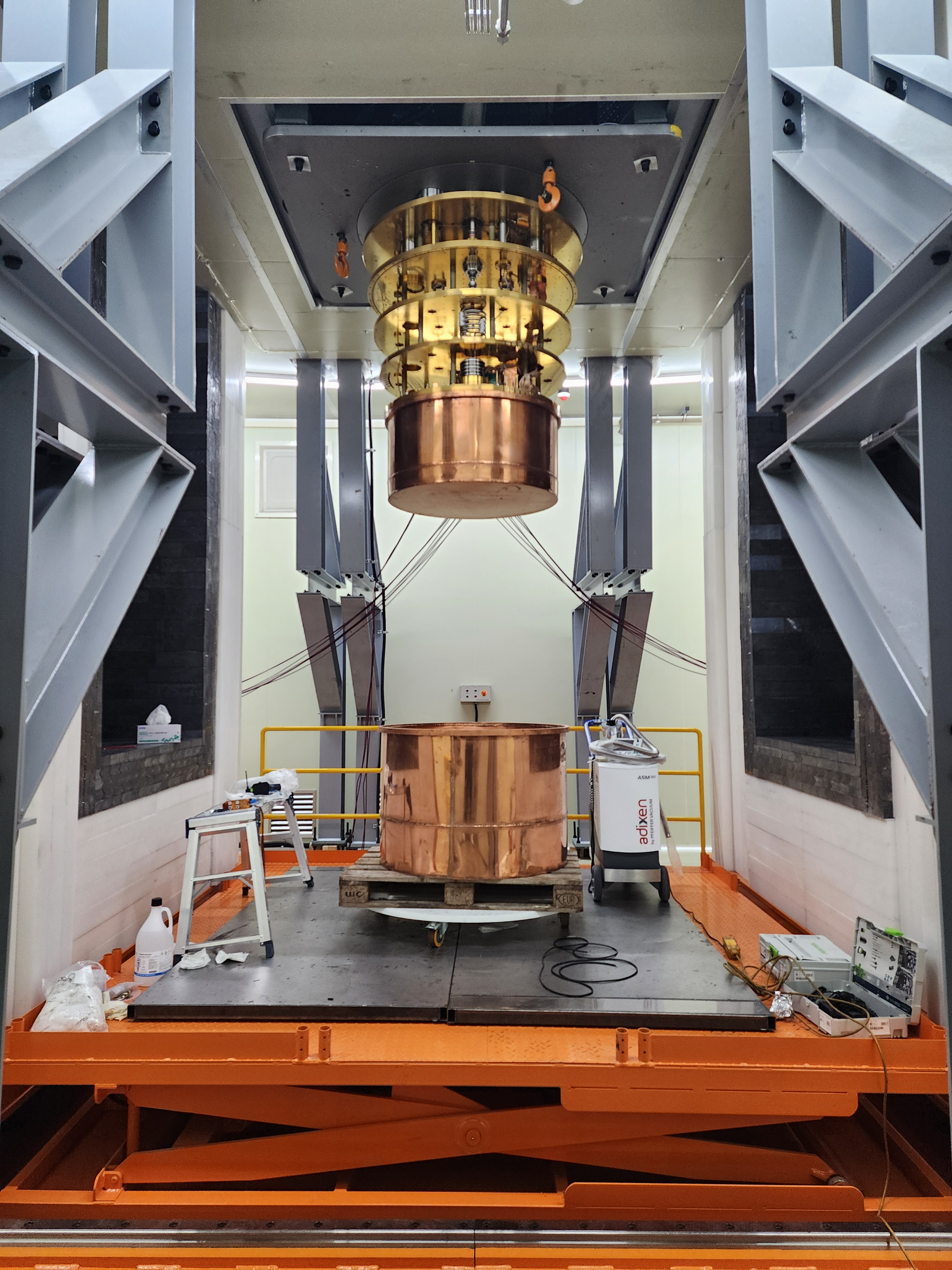
AMoRE muon veto system.

- COSINE-200: Measuring electrical signals when weakly interacting massive particles (WIMP) collide with nucleus in 100 kg sodium iodide crystals
- AMORE-II: Searching for neutrinoless double beta decay (0νββ) of ^{100}Mo isotopes using 200 kg molybdenum crystals
- Large Scintillation Counter (LSC): A future 19.5 m in diameter and 22m in height liquid scintillator detector capable of separating Cherenkov light from scintillator light for solar neutrino and sterile neutrino research

The majority of the space is used by the Center for Underground Physics. The remaining 30% to 40% of experimental space is used by the Korea Atomic Energy Research Institute, Korea Institute of Geoscience and Mineral Resources, Korea Meteorological Administration, Kyungpook National University, National Institute for Mathematical Sciences, and SpaceLinthech; a NASA startup which is using a 600-meter vertical mineshaft for gravity-related experiments.

== In popular culture ==
The documentary Every Single Dot (모든 것) was filmed at Yemilab and premiered at the 29th Busan International Film Festival. Principal Technical Officer So Jungho collaborated on the film.

== See also ==
- Korea Invisible Mass Search
- Super-Kamiokande
- Kamioka Liquid Scintillator Antineutrino Detector
- Sanford Underground Research Facility
- China Jinping Underground Laboratory
