= Yau Wah =

Yau Wai Wah is a physicist.

Wah taught at the University of Chicago and was affiliated with its Enrico Fermi Institute. He conducted research with the Tevatron particle accelerator, and served as spokesperson of the K0 at Tokai experiment at J-PARC. In 2021, he was elected a fellow of the American Physical Society.
