= GSI Helmholtz Centre for Heavy Ion Research =

German research institute

Coordinates: 49°55′53″N 8°40′45″E

- GSI Helmholtzzentrum für Schwerionenforschung

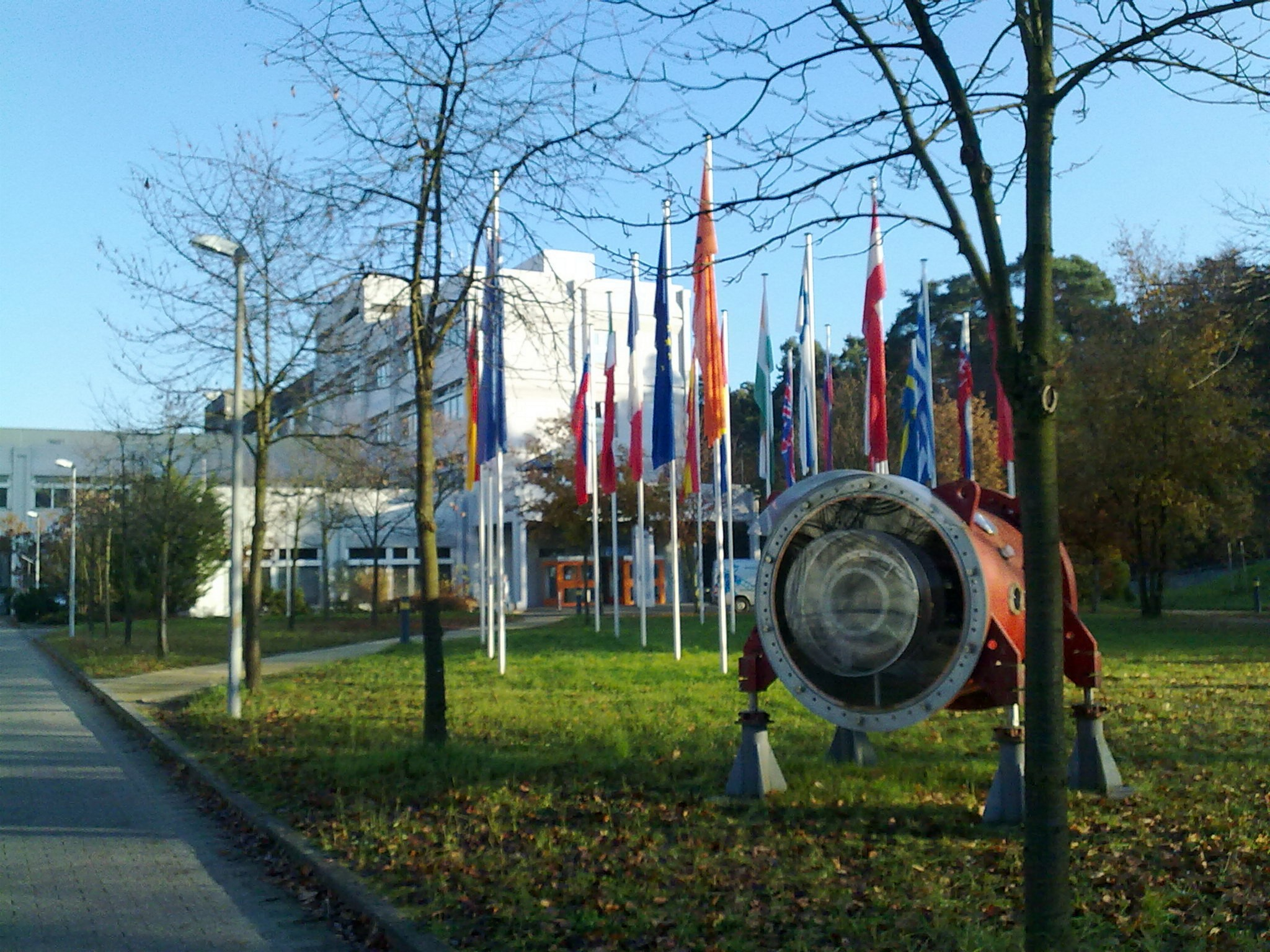
- GSI main entrance, Darmstadt, Germany

- Location within Germany Location within Hesse
- Abbreviation: GSI
- Formation: 1969
- Headquarters: Planckstraße 1; 64291 Darmstadt, Germany
- Administrative Managing Director: Katharina Stummeyer
- Scientific Managing Director: Thomas Nilsson
- Technical Managing Director: Jörg Blaurock
- Website: gsi.de

The GSI Helmholtz Centre for Heavy Ion Research (German: GSI Helmholtzzentrum für Schwerionenforschung) is a federally and state co-funded heavy ion (Schwerion) research center in Darmstadt, Germany. It was founded in 1969 as the Society for Heavy Ion Research (German: Gesellschaft für Schwerionenforschung, GSI), to conduct research on and with heavy-ion accelerators. It is the only major user research center in the State of Hesse.

The laboratory performs basic and applied research in physics and related natural sciences. Main fields of study include plasma physics, atomic physics, nuclear structure and reactions research, biophysics and medical research. The lab is a member of the Helmholtz Association of German Research Centres.

Shareholders are the German Federal Government (90%) and the State of Hesse, Thuringia and Rhineland-Palatinate. As a member of the Helmholtz Association, the current name was given to the facility on 7 October 2008 in order to bring it sharper national and international awareness.

The GSI Helmholtz Centre for Heavy Ion Research has strategic partnerships with the Technische Universität Darmstadt, Goethe University Frankfurt, Johannes Gutenberg University Mainz and the Frankfurt Institute for Advanced Studies.

== Primary research ==
The chief tool is the heavy ion accelerator facility consisting of:

- UNILAC, the Universal Linear Accelerator (energy of 2–11.4 MeV per nucleon)
- SIS 18 (Schwer-Ionen-Synchrotron), the heavy-ion synchrotron (0.010–2 GeV/u)
- ESR, the experimental storage ring (0.005–0.5 GeV/u)
- FRS Fragment Separator.

The UNILAC was commissioned in 1975; the SIS 18 and the ESR were added in 1990 boosting the ion acceleration from 10% of light speed to 90%.

Elements discovered at GSI: bohrium (1981), meitnerium (1982), hassium (1984), darmstadtium (1994), roentgenium (1994), and copernicium (1996).

Elements confirmed at GSI: nihonium (2012), flerovium (2009), moscovium (2012), livermorium (2010), and tennessine (2012).

== History ==
On the initiative of the University of Darmstadt, the University of Frankfurt, and the University of Marburg, the GSI Helmholtz Centre for Heavy Ion Research (GSI) was founded on 17 December 1969 as the Gesellschaft für Schwerionenforschung mbH (GSI). The site chosen was a wooded area in the north of Darmstadt. Construction costs amounted to about 180 million Deutsche Marks. The UNILAC linear accelerator, developed by Christoph Schmelzer—who also became GSI's first managing director in 1971—was realized as the first part of the accelerator complex. From 1975 onwards, the facility delivered its first ion beams for experiments. In the 1980s, several superheavy elements were synthesized for the first time at GSI using the UNILAC beam. During this period, the heavy-ion synchrotron SIS18 and the ESR were planned, built, and commissioned in 1990. Scientific directors at that time were Gisbert zu Putlitz (1978–1983) and Paul Kienle (1984–1992). Under Hans Joachim Specht (1992–1999), discussions began on further expansion of GSI's accelerator facilities and experimental capabilities. These discussions, during the tenure of Walter Henning (1999–2007), led to the project proposal for the FAIR. From 2007 to 2015, Horst Stöcker served as scientific director of GSI. He was succeeded by Ursula Weyrich, Jörg Blaurock and Paolo Giubellino as joint managing directors of GSI and FAIR. The current joint managing directors are Thomas Nilsson (Scientific), Katharina Stummeyer (Administrative), and Jörg Blaurock (Technical).

A fire destroyed parts of the facility on 5 February 2026.

== Technological developments ==
Another important technology developed at the GSI is the use of heavy ion beams for cancer treatment (from 1997). Instead of using X-ray radiation, carbon ions are used to irradiate the patient. The technique allows tumors which are close to vital organs to be treated, which is not possible with X-rays. This is because the Bragg peak of carbon ions is much sharper than the peak of X-ray photons. A facility based on this technology, called Heidelberger Ionenstrahl-Therapiezentrum (HIT), built at the University of Heidelberg Medical Center began treating patients in November 2009.

== Facilities other than UNILAC and SIS-18 ==
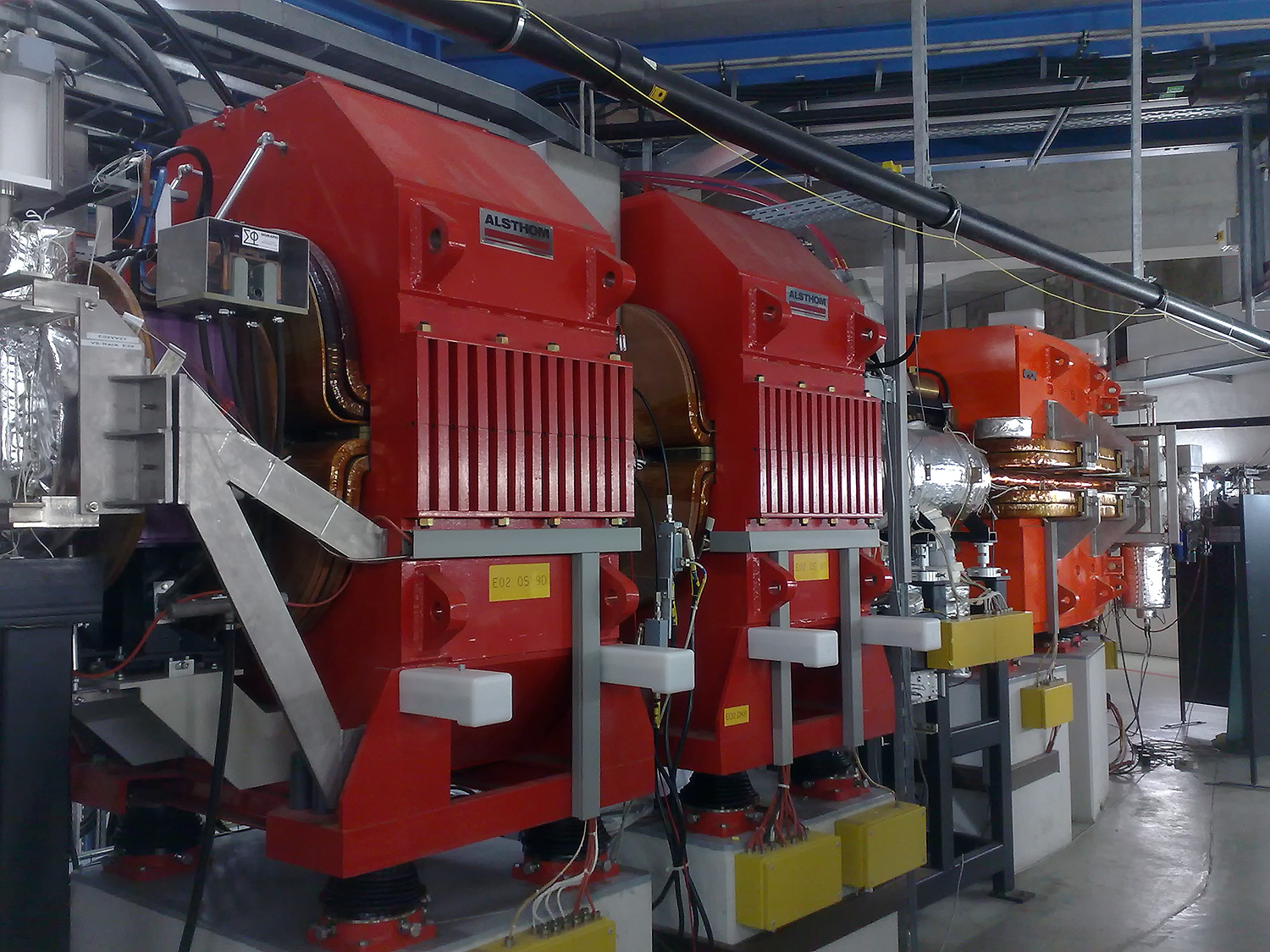
Part of the ESR facility.

- Two high-energy lasers, the nhelix (Nanosecond High Energy Laser for heavy Ion eXperiments) and the Phelix (Petawatt High Energy Laser for heavy Ion eXperiments).
- A Large Area Neutron Detector (LAND).
- A FRagment Separator (FRS) – The GSI Fragment Separator or FRS is a facility built in 1990. It produces and separates different beams of (usually) radioactive ions. The process is made from a stable beam accelerated by UNILAC and then SIS impinging on a production target. From this, many fragments are produced. The secondary beam is produced by magnetic selection of the ions.
- An Experimental Storage Ring (ESR) in which large numbers of highly charged radioactive ions can be stored for extended periods of time with energies of 0.005–0.5 GeV/u. This facility provides the means to make precise measurements of their decay modes. The discovery of a mysterious new phenomenon is known as the GSI anomaly.

== Future evolution ==
In the years to come, GSI will evolve to an international structure named FAIR for Facility for Antiproton and Ion Research: one new synchrotron (with respective magnetic rigidity 100 T⋅m), a Super-FRS and several new rings among which one that can be used for antimatter research. The major part of the facility will be commissioned in 2022; full operation was planned for 2025.

The creation of FAIR was co-signed on 7 November 2007 by 10 countries: Finland, France, Germany, India, Romania, Russia, Slovenia, Sweden, United Kingdom, and Poland. Representatives included Annette Schavan, the German federal minister of science and Roland Koch, the prime minister of the state of Hesse.

== See also ==
- GANIL
- Riken
- JINR
- CERN
- FRIB
- NSCL
- ISIS neutron source
- RAON
