= Universal linear accelerator =

Accelerator in Darmstadt, Germany

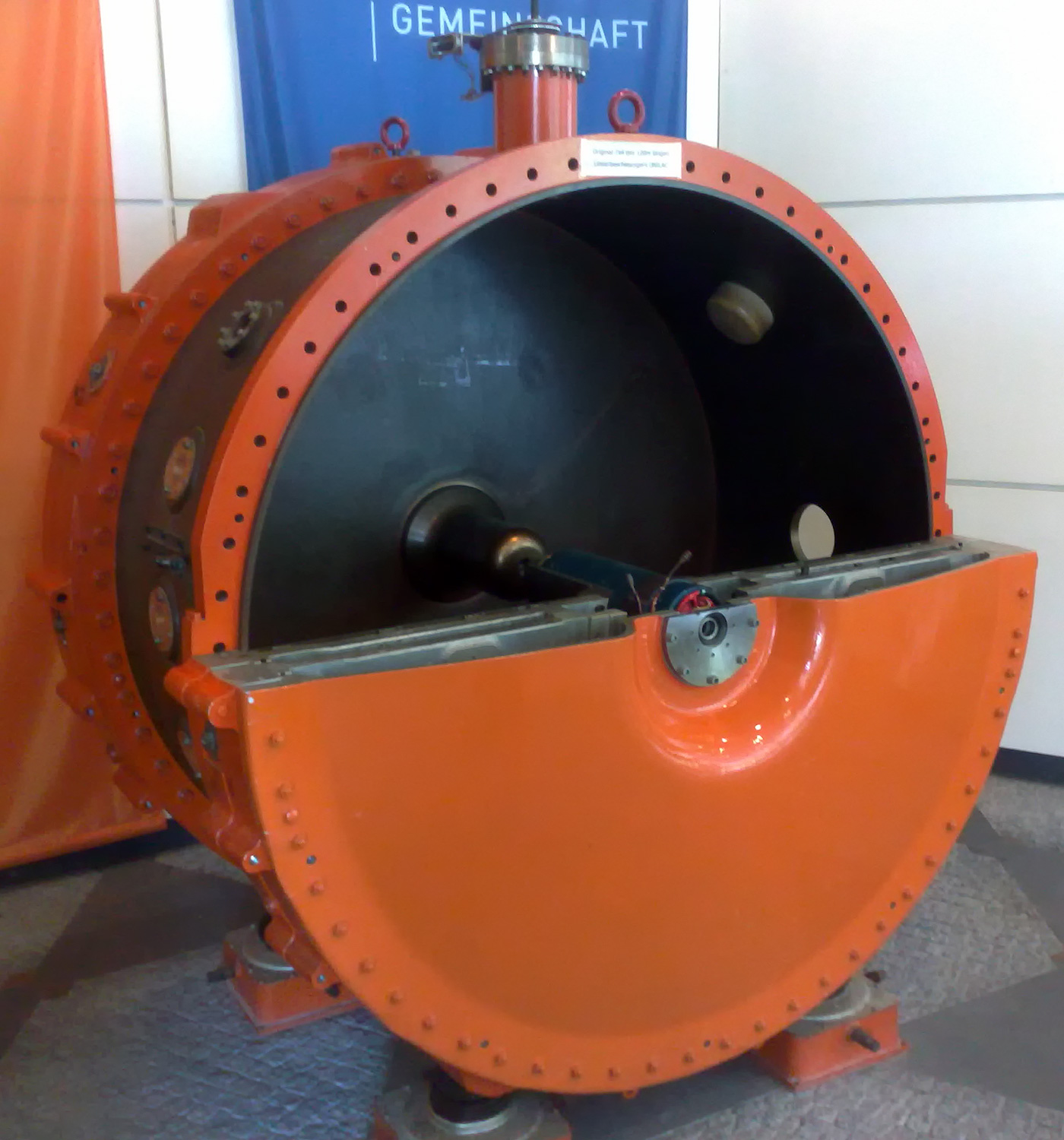
Part of UNILAC GSI

The Universal Linear Accelerator (UNILAC) is a heavy ion linac based at the GSI Helmholtz Centre for Heavy Ion Research near Darmstadt, Germany. It can provide beams of accelerated ions of elements from hydrogen to uranium with energies of 2 to 11.4 MeV/Da.

The main branch consists of two ion source terminals followed by a radio-frequency quadrupole and by an Interdigital linac IH linac accelerator resonating at 36 MHz up to the energy of 1.4 MeV/Da. The main part then is operated by a classical linac of the Alvarez type which resonates at 108 MHz. Final energy adjustment can be performed in the last section consisting of a series of single-gap resonators. This solution was proposed for maximum flexibility in beam energy. The UNILAC is used both to send beams of heavy ions to experiments and to load the SIS18 Heavy-Ion Synchrotron (Schwer-Ionen-Synchrotron) with high-energy ions.

Collisions between heavy-ion beams and stationary targets can be made to generate superheavy transactinide elements. Experiments using beams from UNILAC in the past 20 years have produced elements 107 to 112.

== See also ==
- GSI Helmholtz Centre for Heavy Ion Research
