= Korea Invisible Mass Search =

South Korean particle physics experiment

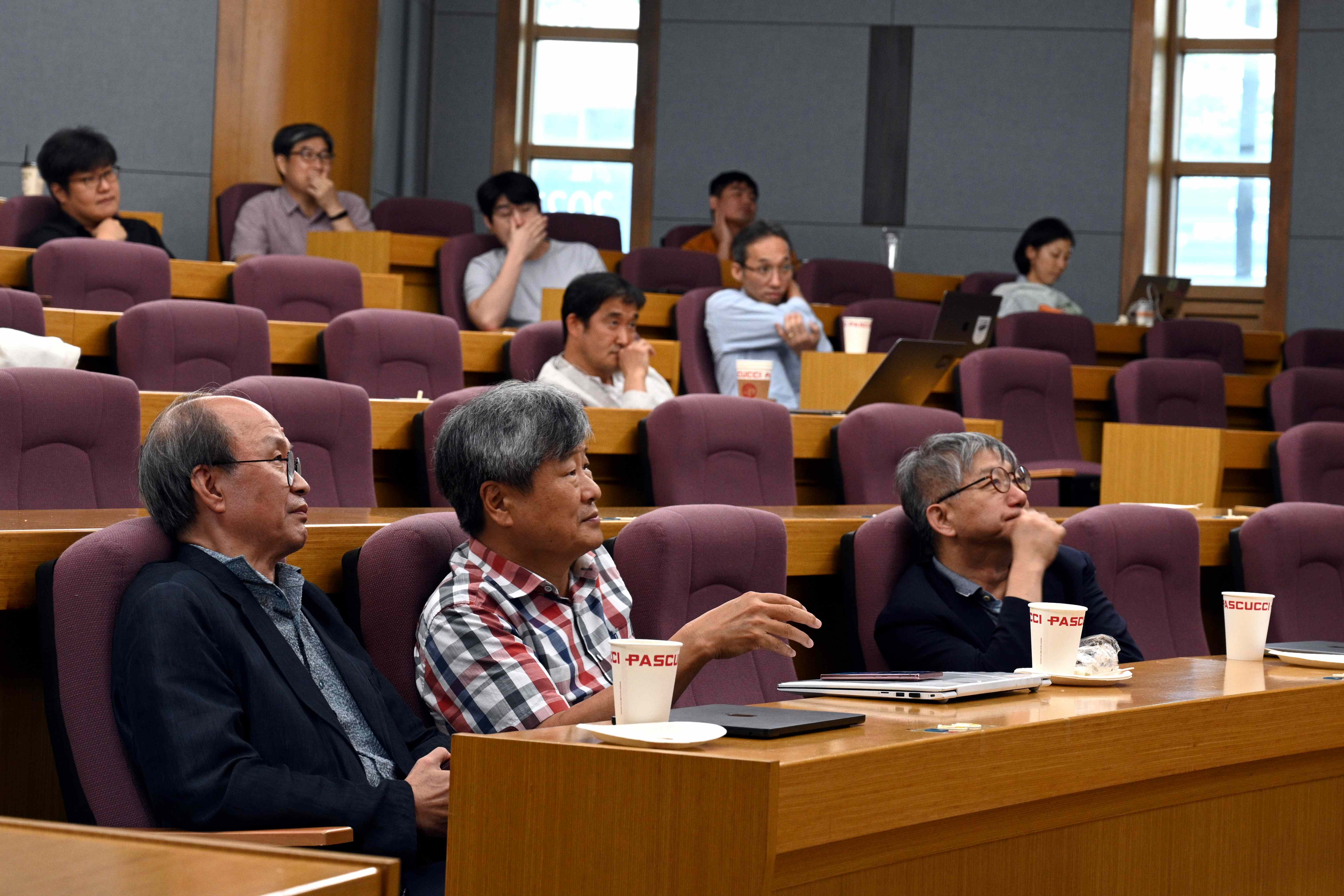
The three founders of KIMS; left to right Kim Sun-kee, Kim Hongjoo, and Kim Yeongduk (ko).

The Korea Invisible Mass Search (KIMS; Korean: 한국 암흑물질 탐색실험), is a South Korean experiment searching for weakly interacting massive particles (WIMPs), one of the candidates for dark matter. The KIMS project was also named such as the three founders all have the surname Kim; Kim Sun-kee, Kim Hongjoo, and Kim Yeongduk. The experiments use CsI(Tl) crystals at Yangyang Underground Laboratory (Y2L), in tunnels from a preexisting underground power plant. KIMS is supported by the Creative Research Initiative program of the Korea Science and Engineering Foundation. It is the first physics experiment located, and largely built, in Korea.

Other research topics include detector development for a neutrinoless double beta decay search and the creation of an extreme low temperature diamond calorimeter.

== History ==
The KIMS experiment was funded in 2000 to search for WIMP dark matter. To avoid the cost of creating a new tunnel for testing, the Yangyang Pumped Storage Power Plant belonging to Korea Middleland Power Co. in Yangyang, Korea was used. Construction was completed in 2003. The CsI(Tl) scintillating crystal used has a high light yield and is affordable for large mass. After a substantial effort for the initial setup and crystal development, KIMS began recording data in 2004 with one full-size 6 kg crystal. A 4 crystal setup was run in 2005–2006 to optimize the WIMP search. In 2008, the 12 crystal array with 103.4 kg mass was completed and ran until December 2012 for a detector upgrade replacing the PMTs.

== Results ==
The first WIMP cross section search was published in 2006 using the one crystal data. New limits were presented in 2007 and 2012, inconsistent with the DAMA signal reports for masses above 20 GeV. Using 24,324.3 kg•days exposure, low-mass WIMP signals below 20 GeV were disfavored in 2014.

== COSINE ==
The KIMS and DM-Ice groups collaborated to make a new detector consisting of an array of NaI(Tl) scintillating crystals to confirm or refute the DAMA/LIBRA results. As of July 2016, the 100 kg COSINE-100 experiment had been installed at Y2L. In September 2016, physics data started to be collected. The next version of the COSINE detector, COSINE-200, will be constructed in Yemilab in Jeongseon County.

The COSINE-100 published its first results on 5 December 2018 in Nature; they concluded that their result "rules out WIMP–nucleon interactions as the cause of the annual modulation observed by the DAMA collaboration". This rejection applies only to WIMPs with one of the 18 tested masses, exhibiting spin-independent interactions with sodium or iodine nucleons, within the context of a standard dark matter halo model.

In November 2021, new results from COSINE-100 experiment from 1.7 years of data collection have also failed to replicate the signal of DAMA.

In August 2022, COSINE-100 applied an analysis method similar to one used by DAMA/LIBRA and found a similar annual modulation suggesting the signal could be just a statistical artifact supporting an hypothesis first put forward on 2020.
