= Tom Aidala =

American architect

Tom Aidala (December 23, 1933, New York – January 22, 2016, Kelseyville, California) was an American architect. He was the principal architect behind the revitalization of downtown San Jose, California. His projects included pedestrian bridges over the Guadalupe River, the Circle of Palms near the Fairmont San Jose, and the Paseo de San Antonio transit station. He was employed by the San Jose Redevelopment Agency between 1983 and 1998. An avowed Modernist, he wrote "Thou shalt not allow one more mansard roof in San Jose."

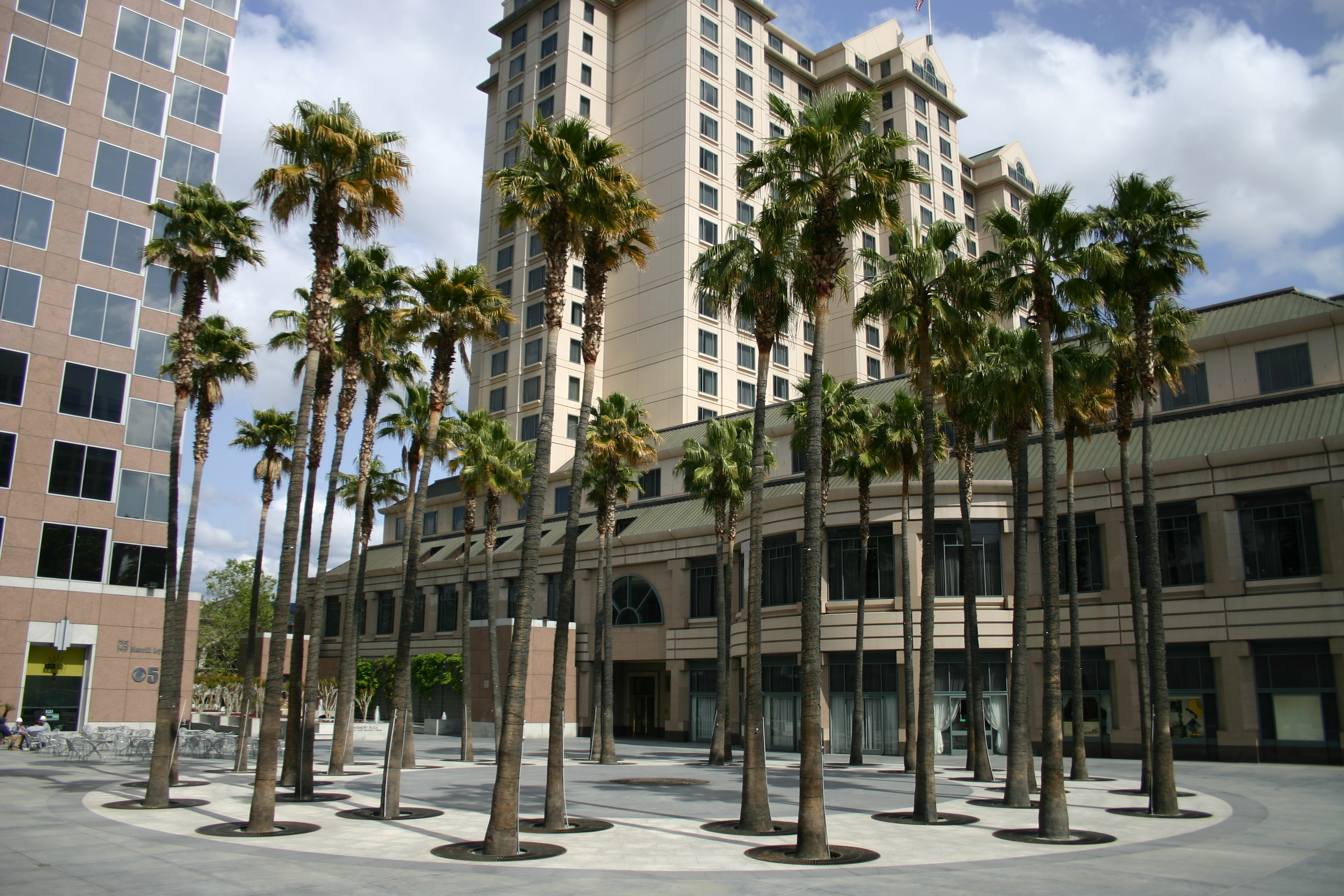
Circle of Palms Plaza, San Jose
