= Deborah A. Harris =

American physicist

- Education: University of California Berkeley, University of Chicago
- Scientific career
- Thesis: A search for the decays 𝐾 𝐿 → 𝜋 0 ℓ + ℓ − (1994)
- Doctoral advisor: Yau W. Wah

Deborah Appel Harris is an American physicist whose research focuses on neutrinos, including neutrino oscillations and neutrino interactions with atomic nuclei through observations in the Deep Underground Neutrino Experiment and the MINERνA experiment at Fermilab. She holds joint appointments as a professor (research stream) at York University in Toronto, Canada, and at Fermilab in the US, and is a co-spokesperson for the MINERνA project.

== Education and career ==
Harris graduated in 1989 from the University of California, Berkeley, with a bachelor's degree in physics, with a summer job as a student technician at Fermilab. She continued her studies in physics at the University of Chicago, where she received a master's degree in 1992 and completed her Ph.D. in 1994. Her dissertation, A search for the decays $K_L\to\pi^0\ell^+\ell^-$, was supervised by Yau Wah.

After postdoctoral research at the University of Rochester from 1994 to 1999, Harris returned to Fermilab as an associate scientist in 1999, and was promoted to scientist in 2005 and senior scientist in 2010. In 2019 she added a second joint affiliation as full professor at York University.

== Recognition ==
Harris was named as a Fellow of the American Physical Society (APS) in 2014, after a nomination from the APS Division of Particles and Fields, "for leadership in measuring the neutrino reactions that enable current and future accelerator neutrino oscillation experiments".
