= Radioactive Isotope Beam Factory =

Particle accelerator in Japan

Coordinates: 35.7805°N 139.6126°E

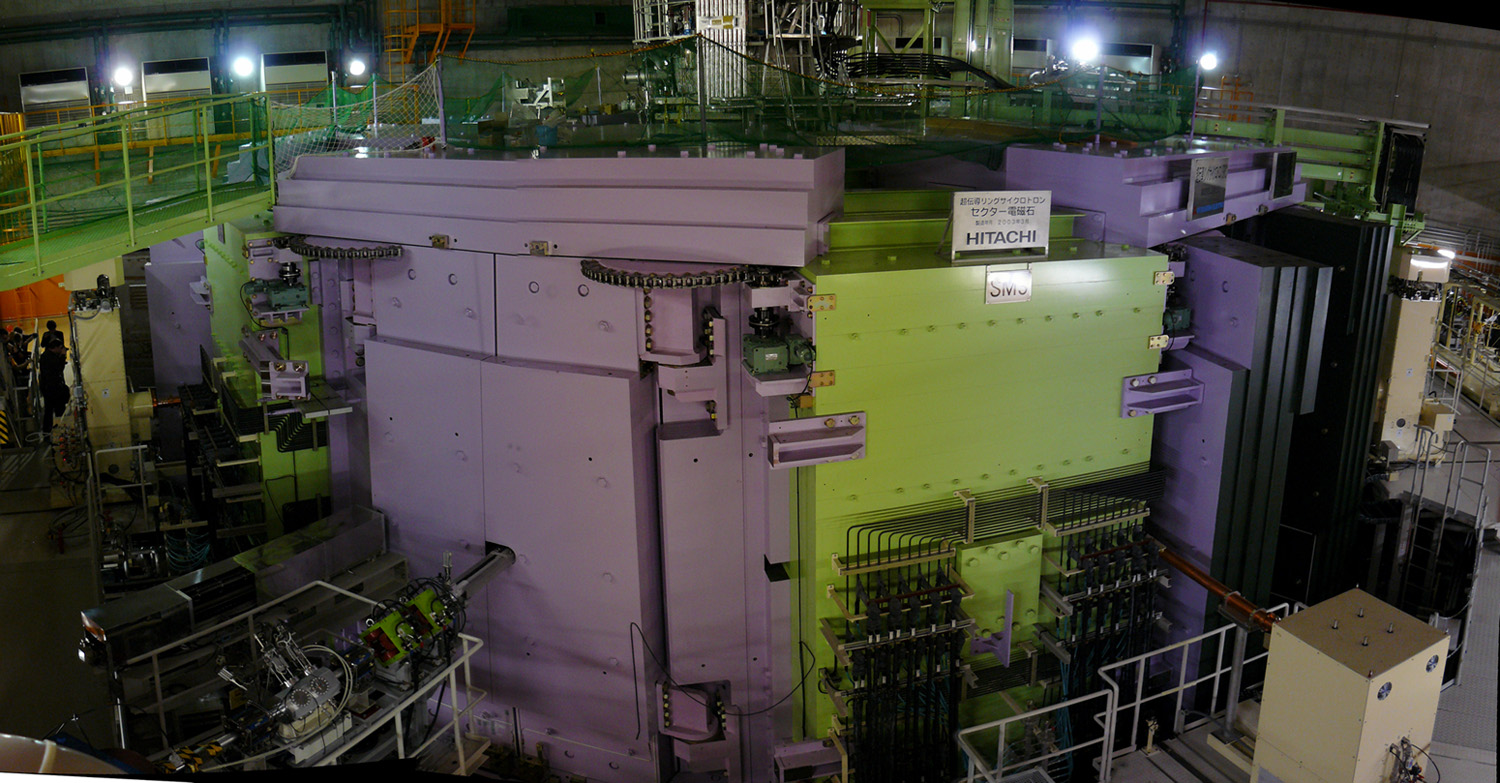
Superconducting Ring Cyclotron (SRC)

The Radioactive Isotope Beam Factory is a multistage particle accelerator complex operated by Japan's Nishina Center for Accelerator-Based Science which is itself a part of the Institute of Physical and Chemical Research. Located in Saitama, the RIBF generates unstable nuclei of all elements up to uranium and studies their properties. According to physicist Robert Janssens, "[it] can produce the most intense beams of primary particles in the world."

RIBF took ten years to construct and its Superconducting Ring Cyclotron (SRC) can achieve energies of 2,600 MeV.

Work at the RIBF has contributed to the understanding of atomic magic numbers.

== See also ==
- Rare isotope Accelerator complex for ON-line experiment
