= Christine Aidala =

American high-energy nuclear physicist

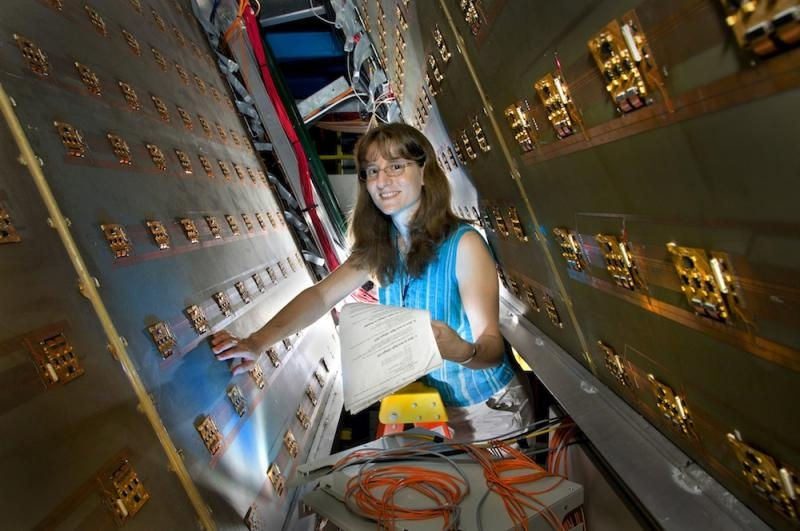
- Christine Aidala, American physicist
- Born: Christine Angela Aidala
- Education: Yale University (BS), 1999; Columbia University (PhD)
- Awards: Sloan Research Fellowship; National Science Foundation CAREER Award; Presidential Early Career Award for Scientists and Engineers
- Scientific career
- Workplaces: University of Michigan; CERN; Fermilab; Brookhaven National Laboratory; Los Alamos National Laboratory
- Thesis: Measurement of the Transverse Single-Spin Asymmetry for Mid-rapidity Production of Neutral Pions in Polarized p+p Collisions at 200 GeV Center-of-Mass Energy (2006)
- Academic advisors: Brian A. Cole
- Website: lsa.umich.edu/physics/people/faculty/caidala.html

Christine Angela Aidala is an American high-energy nuclear physicist, Alfred P. Sloan Research Fellow and Associate Professor of Physics at the University of Michigan. She studies nucleon structure and parton dynamics in quantum chromodynamics.

== Education ==
She received a B.S. in physics and a B.S. in music from Yale University in 1999. During her undergraduate studies, she taught English and music in Milan, Italy. She earned her Ph.D. from Columbia University in 2005. During her Ph.D., she was also a Physics Associate at Brookhaven National Laboratory and worked on the OPAL Experiment at CERN.

== Career and research ==
Aidala was a postdoctoral researcher at University of Massachusetts Amherst, where she studied proton spin decomposition using the Relativistic Heavy Ion Collider at Brookhaven National Laboratory. In addition to numerous research publications, she authored a review article on nucleon spin structure in the journal Reviews of Modern Physics that has been cited over 200 times.

She currently studies nucleon structure and quantum chromodynamics with her research lab at the University of Michigan. The Aidala group's work involves international collaboration to study spin-spin and spin-momentum correlations in a variety of subatomic particles. Her experiments use the Relativistic Heavy Ion Collider at Brookhaven National Laboratory, the Main Injector at Fermilab, and the Large Hadron Collider at CERN.

In 2017, she was selected to serve on a National Academy of Sciences committee to assess the justification for a domestic electron ion collider facility in the United States.

In addition to researching subatomic particle structure, she is working on a foundational physics project deriving the standard mathematical frameworks for Hamiltonian and Lagrangian mechanics from physical assumptions.

Aidala has participated in numerous outreach activities, including Saturday Morning Physics and coordinating physics demonstrations for elementary and middle school students.

In 2013, she wrote an essay about her career path, which was published in the book "Blazing the Trail: Essays by Leading Women in Science". She has also been interviewed on this topic.

=== Awards and honors ===
In 2015, she was awarded a Sloan Research Fellowship and was a recipient of a National Science Foundation CAREER Award in 2018. In July 2019 she received the Presidential Early Career Award for Scientists and Engineers.

She was named a Fellow of the American Physical Society in 2023, "for a series of impressive experiments aimed at elucidating the flavor and spin structure of the proton in terms of the quarks and gluons of QCD, conducted at high-energy facilities in both the USA and Europe".
