= RAON =

Particle physics laboratory in South Korea

Rare Isotope Science Project: RAON
- 중이온가속기건설구축사업단: 라온
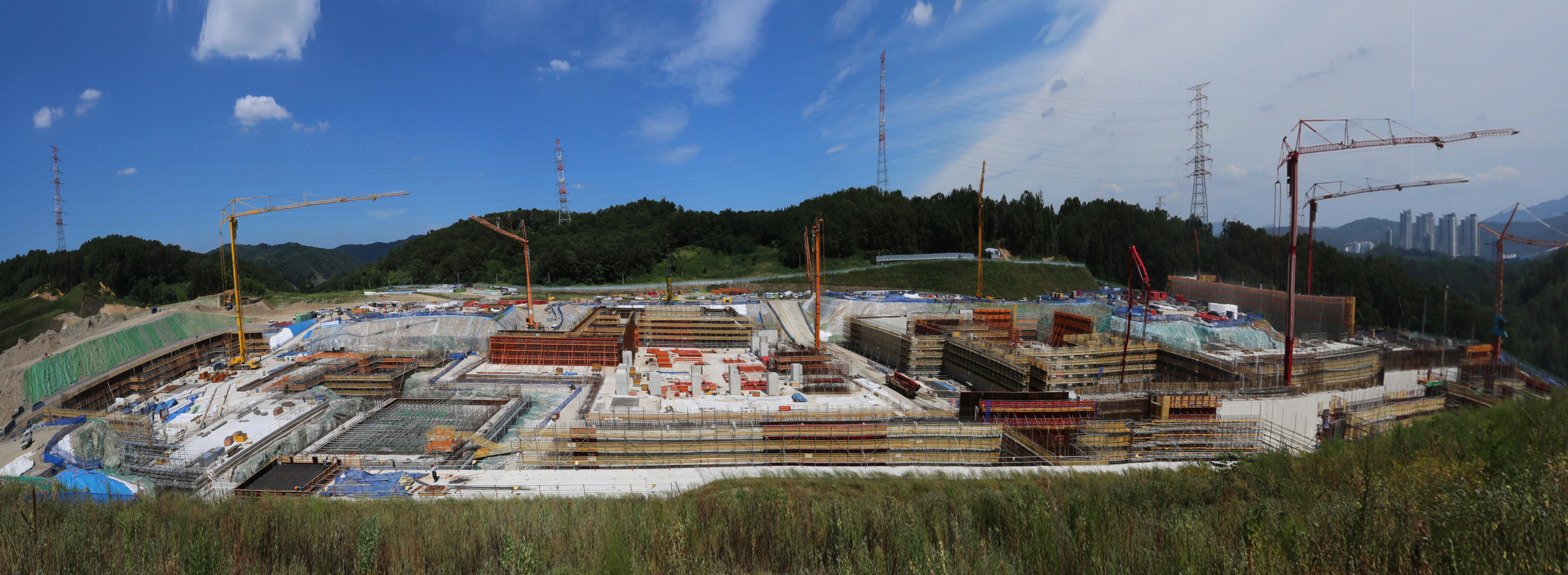
- Type: Governmental organisation
- Headquarters: Daejeon, South Korea
- Location: 70, Yuseong-daero 1689-gil, Yuseong-gu, Daejeon, South Korea
- Coordinates: 36.4785°N 127.3715°E
- Director: HONG Seung Woo
- Budget: 1.4523 trillion KRW
- Website: risp.ibs.re.kr/html/risp_en/

- RAON
- Hangul: 라온
- RR: Raon
- MR: Raon

Rare Isotope Science Project
- Hangul: 중이온가속기건설구축사업단
- Hanja: 重이온加速器建設構築事業團
- RR: Jungion gasokgi geonseol guchuk saeopdan
- MR: Chungion kasokki kŏnsŏl kuch'uk saŏptan

RAON is a South Korean particle physics laboratory constructed in the outskirts of Daejeon neighboring Sejong, South Korea by the Institute for Basic Science (IBS). It was expected to be finished by 2021 before getting pushed back to 2025.

RAON is part of the South Korean Rare Isotope Science Project (RISP) initiative. The facilities are operated by Institute for Rare Isotope Science (IRIS) which is under the umbrella of the Institute for Basic Science.

== Name ==
The name Rare isotope Accelerator complex for ON-line experiment or RAON, was selected through a contest open to the public in 2012. RAON comes from the Korean word 라온 meaning "happy" or "joyful". Among 639 entries, the winning name was actually Raonhaje (라온하제) meaning "happy tomorrow" but was shortened for easier pronunciation. RAON is also the name of their chemical element mascot with atomic number 41 and niobium written on the stomach.

== Type ==
RAON is a heavy ion particle accelerator that will include both isotope separation on-line (ISOL) and in-flight fragmentation (IF) methods, and aims to be the first to use both. The superconducting linear accelerator will have a maximum beam power of 400 kW, and projectile fragmentation will be powered by a 200 MeV/u uranium beam in the IF system. The ISOL system will have a H^{−} cyclotron of 70 kW.

Due to the complexity of the project, RAON's researchers are working in collaboration with a number of other accelerator research groups, including CERN, Fermilab, TRIUMF, and Riken.

The cost is estimated at 1.4523 trillion KRW (roughly US$1.4 billion) in which 460.2 billion KRW is for device construction, 635 billion KRW for facility construction, and 357.1 billion KRW for land purchase. The size of the site is 652,066 m^{2} with a total floor area of 130,144 m^{2}. In additional to the primary accelerator site under construction in Shindong (신동), RISP has the ISOL Off-line Test Facility in Yuseong-gu, Superconducting Radio Frequency test facility in KAIST's Munji Campus, and the Accelerator and ICT Building in Korea University Sejong Campus.

== Research ==
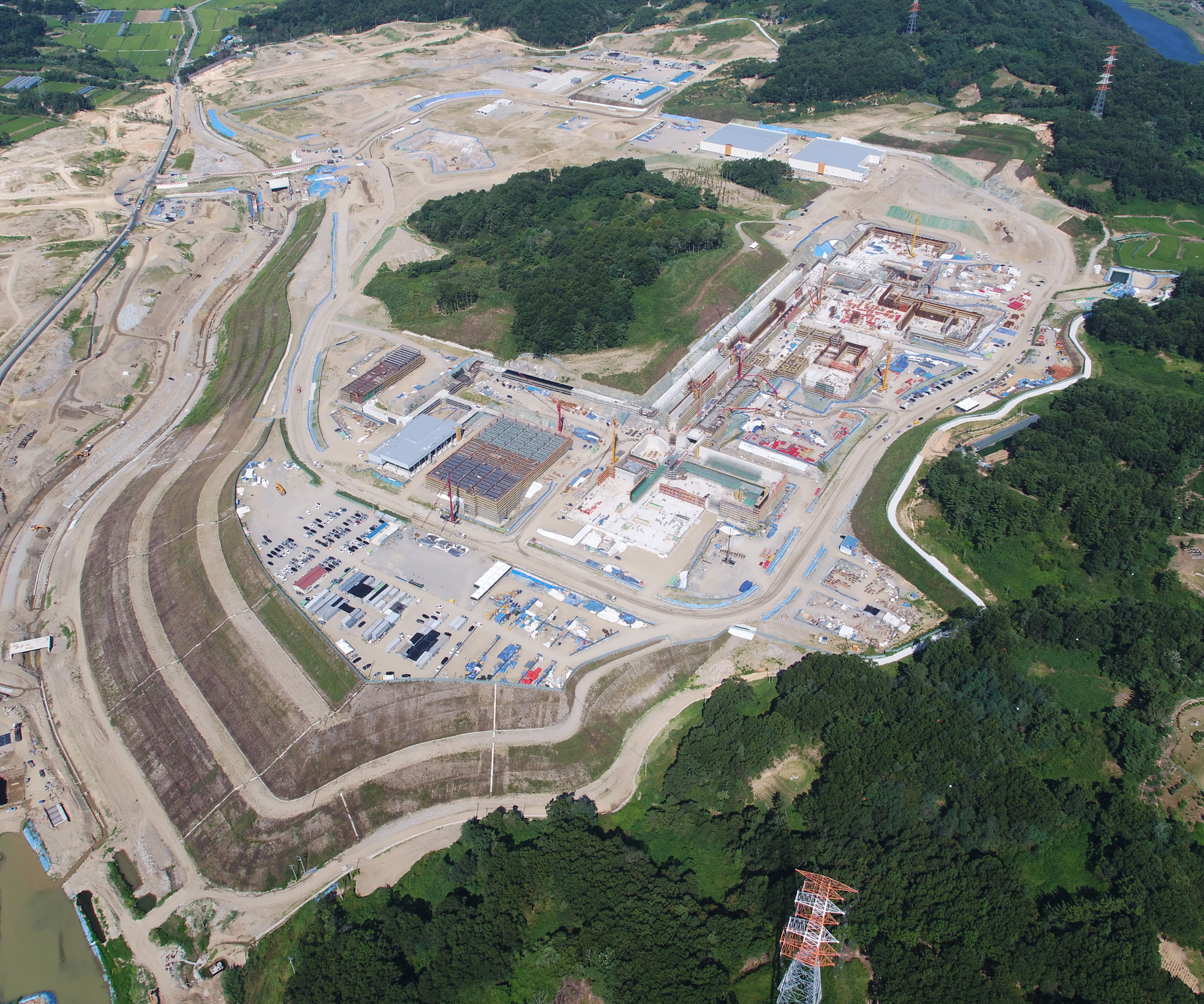
Image of the site taken from a drone in August 2018.

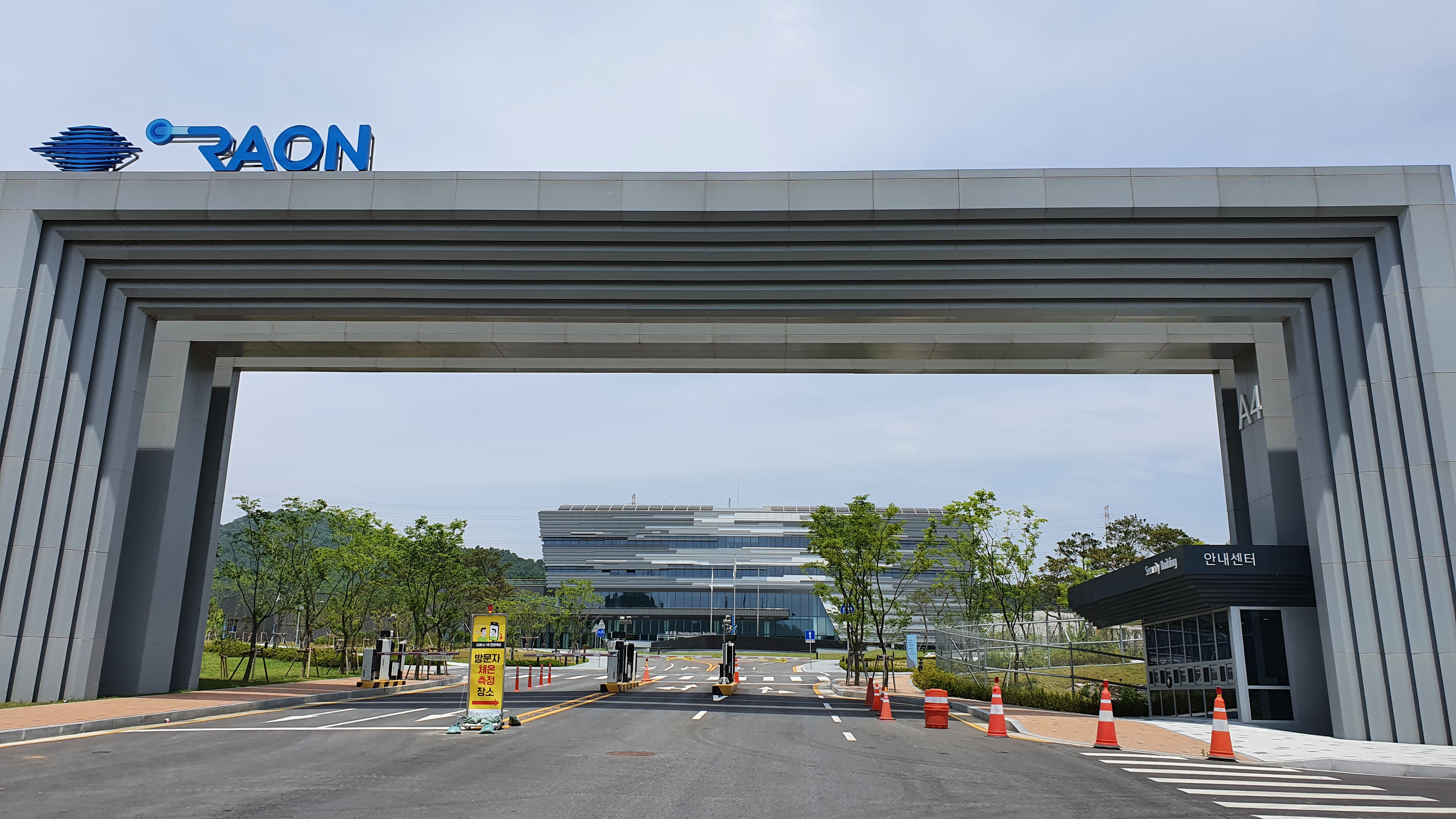
The entrance of RAON complex in May 2021.

=== Nuclear science ===
Research areas in the field of nuclear science include the study of the origin of elements and evolution of stars, nuclear force and structure, nuclear reactions, and nuclear science theory.

- Korea Broad acceptance Recoil spectrometer and Apparatus (KOBRA): Study the production of nuclear structures and rare isotopes through the collisions of nuclei of rare isotopes and stable atoms
- Large Acceptance Multi-Purpose Spectrometer (LAMPS): Observe the high density states of substances resulting from collisions of neutron-rich rare isotopes
- Nuclear Data Production System (NDPS): Produce precise atomic nuclear reaction data on rare isotope nuclear materials and high-speed neutrons

=== Physical science ===
The group aims to develop an ultra-sensitive device for measuring the physical properties of muons, and study the properties of new materials, including semiconductors, nano-magnetic materials, high-temperature superconductors, and topological insulators.

- Muon Spin Relaxation (μSR): Use muons to research superconductivity, nano-magnetism, and topological insulation through measuring local electromagnetic properties

=== Atomic and molecular science ===
In these fields, they aim to precisely measure rare isotope mass and develop atomic manipulation technology, develop micro-measurement technology for atomic structures, and find the precise measurements of basic physical constants.

- Mass Measurement System (MMS): Categorize rare isotopes and find new atoms through precise mass measurements
- Collinear Laser Spectroscopy (CLS): Categorize rare isotopes and know their nuclear characteristics through the changes in their shapes and atomic energy levels

=== Biomedical science ===
Research the application of rare isotopes in cancer treatment.

- Beam Irradiation System (BIS): Develop biomedical techniques for cancer treatment by exposing biological tissue samples to heavy-ion or rare isotope beams to selectively destroy cells and modify DNA

== Timeline ==
- 2009: The National Science and Technology Council confirms the International Science and Business Belt plans, which include RISP.
- 2010: The heavy-ion accelerator pre-planning study was completed in June.
- 2011: A conceptual design study was completed in February. In December, the Rare Isotope Science Project officially launched.
- 2012: The basic plan to establish RAON was completed
- 2013: In June the technical design report for RAON was completed and the basic plan to establish RAON was modified.
- 2014: The basic plan was confirmed in May and the facility construction plan commenced in December.
- 2015: The basic plan was modified in April and the facility construction plan was completed in December.
- 2018: RAON installation begins
- 2020: Completion of building construction
- 2025: Completion of RAON construction

== See also ==
- Facility for Rare Isotope Beams
- On-Line Isotope Mass Separator
- Facility for Antiproton and Ion Research
- GSI Helmholtz Centre for Heavy Ion Research
- PANDA experiment
- Radioactive Isotope Beam Factory
