= Neutron detection =

Neutron detection is the effective detection of neutrons entering a well-positioned detector. There are two key aspects to effective neutron detection: hardware and software. Detection hardware refers to the kind of neutron detector used (the most common today is the scintillation detector) and to the electronics used in the detection setup. Further, the hardware setup also defines key experimental parameters, such as source-detector distance, solid angle and detector shielding. Detection software consists of analysis tools that perform tasks such as graphical analysis to measure the number and energies of neutrons striking the detector.

== Basic physics ==
=== Signatures by which a neutron may be detected ===
Atomic and subatomic particles are detected by the signature they produce through interaction with their surroundings. The interactions result from the particles' fundamental characteristics.

- Charge: Neutrons are neutral particles and do not ionize directly; hence they are harder to detect directly than charged particles. Further, their paths of motion are only weakly affected by electric and magnetic fields.
- Mass: The neutron mass of 1.0086649156(6) Da is not directly detectable, but does influence reactions through which it can be detected.
- Reactions: Neutrons react with a number of materials through elastic scattering producing a recoiling nucleus, inelastic scattering producing an excited nucleus, or absorption with transmutation of the resulting nucleus. Most detection approaches rely on detecting the various reaction products.
- Magnetic moment: Although neutrons have a magnetic moment of −1.9130427(5) μ_{N}, techniques for detection of the magnetic moment are too insensitive to use for neutron detection.
- Electric dipole moment: The neutron is predicted to have only a tiny electric dipole moment, which has not yet been detected. Hence it is not a viable detection signature.
- Decay: Outside the nucleus, free neutrons are unstable and have a mean lifetime of 885.7±0.8 s (about 14 minutes, 46 seconds). Free neutrons decay by emission of an electron and an electron antineutrino to become a proton, a process known as beta decay:
  n^{0} → p^{+} + e^{−} + ν̅_{e}.

Although the p^{+} and e^{−} produced by neutron decay are detectable, the decay rate is too low to serve as the basis for a practical detector system.

=== Classic neutron detection options ===
As a result of these properties, detection of neutrons fall into several major categories:

- Absorptive reactions with prompt reactions - low energy neutrons are typically detected indirectly through absorption reactions. Typical absorber materials used have high cross sections for absorption of neutrons and include helium-3, lithium-6, boron-10, and uranium-235. Each of these reacts by emission of high energy ionized particles, the ionization track of which can be detected by a number of means. Commonly used reactions include ^{3}He(n,p) ^{3}H, ^{6}Li(n,t) ^{4}He, ^{10}B(n,α) ^{7}Li and the fission of uranium.
- Activation processes - Neutrons may be detected by reacting with absorbers in a radiative capture, spallation or similar reaction, producing reaction products that then decay at some later time, releasing beta particles or gammas. Selected materials (e.g., indium, gold, rhodium, iron (^{56}Fe(n,p) ^{56}Mn), aluminum (^{27}Al(n,α)^{24}Na), niobium (^{93}Nb(n,2n) ^{92m}Nb), and silicon (^{28}Si(n,p) ^{28}Al)) have extremely large cross sections for the capture of neutrons within a very narrow band of energy. Use of multiple absorber samples allows characterization of the neutron energy spectrum. Activation also enables the reconstruction of historic neutron exposures (e.g., forensic reconstruction of neutron exposures during an accidental criticality).
- Elastic scattering reactions (also referred to as proton-recoil) - High energy neutrons are typically detected indirectly through elastic scattering reactions. Neutrons collide with the nuclei of atoms in the detector, transferring energy to those nuclei and creating ions, which are detected. Since the maximum transfer of energy occurs when the mass of the atom with which the neutron collides is comparable to the neutron mass, hydrogenous materials are often the preferred medium for such detectors.

== Types of neutron detectors ==
=== Gas proportional detectors ===
Gas proportional detectors can be adapted to detect neutrons. While neutrons do not typically cause ionization, the addition of a nuclide with high neutron cross-section allows the detector to respond to neutrons. Nuclides commonly used for this purpose are helium-3, lithium-6, boron-10 and uranium-235. Since these materials are most likely to react with thermal neutrons (i.e., neutrons that have slowed to equilibrium with their surroundings), they are typically surrounded by moderating materials to reduce their energy and increase the likelihood of detection.

Further refinements are usually necessary to differentiate the neutron signal from the effects of other types of radiation. Since the energy of a thermal neutron is relatively low, charged particle reactions are discrete (i.e., essentially monoenergetic and lie within a narrow bandwidth of energies) while other reactions such as gamma reactions will span a broad energy range, it is possible to discriminate among the sources.

As a class, gas ionization detectors measure the number (count rate), and not the energy of neutrons.

==== ^{3}He gas-filled proportional detectors ====
Helium-3 is an effective neutron detector material because it reacts by absorbing thermal neutrons, producing a ^{1}H and ^{3}H ion. Its sensitivity to gamma rays is negligible, providing a very useful neutron detector. Unfortunately the supply of ^{3}He is limited to production as a byproduct from the decay of tritium (which has a 12.3 year half-life); tritium is produced either as part of weapons programs as a booster for nuclear weapons or as a byproduct of reactor operation.

==== BF_{3} gas-filled proportional detectors ====
As elemental boron is not gaseous, neutron detectors containing boron may alternately use boron trifluoride (BF_{3}) enriched to 96% boron-10 (natural boron is 20% ^{10}B, 80% ^{11}B). Counters with natural boron trifluoride were introduced by the so-called Via Panisperna boys as early as 1935.

Boron trifluoride is highly toxic. The sensitivity of this detector is around 35-40 CPS/nv (counts per second per neutron flux) the sensitivity of boron-lined detectors is approximately 4 CPS/nv. This is because in boron-lined detectors, neutrons react with boron to produce ion pairs inside the boron layer and so charged particles produced (alpha particles and lithium ions) may lose some of their energy inside that layer. This means that low-energy charged particles may be unable to reach the ionization chamber's gas environment resulting in a lower number of ionizations produced. In BF_{3} gas-filled detectors, on the other hand, neutrons react with ^{10}B atoms inside the detector gas volume, so charged particles produced are more likely to deposit their energy in the gas volume, producing more ionizations and therefore higher signal.

==== Boron-lined proportional detectors ====
Boron-lined gas-filled proportional counters react similarly to BF_{3} gas-filled proportional detectors, but instead of containing boron-rich gas, the walls are coated with ^{10}B with another fill gas. Again, a similar design with natural boron was introduced in 1935 by the same Italian physicists. In this design, since the reaction takes place on the surface, only one of the two particles will escape into the proportional counter.

=== Scintillation neutron detectors ===
Scintillation neutron detectors include liquid organic scintillators, crystals, plastics, glass and scintillation fibers.

==== Organic Scintillators ====
Organic scintillators are materials that have the property to emit light (scintillate) when exposed to ionizing radiation. They generally have fast response time to radiation and can detect a wide range of radiation (from gamma to neutrons). As the name suggests, they are usually made of organic materials, mostly carbon-based materials.

The organic scintillators comes in many forms such as plastic scintillators, liquid scintillators, and crystal scintillators. The plastic scintillators are made from polymers like polyvinyltoluene (PVT) or polystyrene. The Liquid scintillators are simply made by dissolving the organic scintillators in suitable solvents. The crystal scintillators are made of solid crystals like anthracene or stilbene.

When a scintillator is exposed to ionizing radiation, the molecules within them are excited to a higher energy state through the interaction with the incoming radiation. These excited molecules try to become stable (return to ground energy state) by emitting a photon. The emitted light can be detected by amplifying it in a photo-multiplier and converted to an electric signal. These signals are proportional to the energy of the radiation, which helps in identifying the radiation that was exposed to.

The neutrons can be detected by the organic scintillators using the Pulse Shape Discrimination (PSD) technique, which can differentiate between the radiation based on their pulse/signal shape.

==== Neutron-sensitive scintillating glass fiber detectors ====
Scintillating ^{6}Li glass for neutron detection was first reported in the scientific literature in 1957 and key advances were made in the 1960s and 1970s. Scintillating fiber was demonstrated by Atkinson M. et al. in 1987 and major advances were made in the late 1980s and early 1990s at Pacific Northwest National Laboratory where it was developed as a classified technology. It was declassified in 1994 and first licensed by Oxford Instruments in 1997, followed by a transfer to Nucsafe in 1999. The fiber and fiber detectors are now manufactured and sold commercially by Nucsafe, Inc.

The scintillating glass fibers work by incorporating ^{6}Li and Ce^{3+} into the glass bulk composition. The ^{6}Li has a high cross-section for thermal neutron absorption through the ^{6}Li(n,α) reaction. Neutron absorption produces a tritium ion, an alpha particle, and kinetic energy. The alpha particle and triton interact with the glass matrix to produce ionization, which transfers energy to Ce^{3+} ions and results in the emission of photons with wavelength 390 nm – 600 nm as the excited state Ce^{3+} ions return to the ground state. The event results in a flash of light of several thousand photons for each neutron absorbed. A portion of the scintillation light propagates through the glass fiber, which acts as a waveguide. The fibers ends are optically coupled to a pair of photomultiplier tubes (PMTs) to detect photon bursts. The detectors can be used to detect both neutrons and gamma rays, which are typically distinguished using pulse-height discrimination. Substantial effort and progress in reducing fiber detector sensitivity to gamma radiation has been made. Original detectors suffered from false neutrons in a 0.02 mR gamma field. Design, process, and algorithm improvements now enable operation in gamma fields up to 20 mR/h (^{60}Co).

The scintillating fiber detectors have excellent sensitivity, they are rugged, and have fast timing (~60 ns) so that a large dynamic range in counting rates is possible. The detectors have the advantage that they can be formed into any desired shape, and can be made very large or very small for use in a variety of applications. Further, they do not rely on ^{3}He or any raw material that has limited availability, nor do they contain toxic or regulated materials. Their performance matches or exceeds that of ^{3}He tubes for gross neutron counting due to the higher density of neutron absorbing species in the solid glass compared to high-pressure gaseous ^{3}He. Even though the thermal neutron cross section of ^{6}Li is low compared to ^{3}He (940 barns vs. 5330 barns), the atom density of ^{6}Li in the fiber is fifty times greater, resulting in an advantage in effective capture density ratio of approximately 10:1.

==== LiCaAlF_{6} ====
LiCaAlF_{6} is a neutron sensitive inorganic scintillator crystal which like neutron-sensitive scintillating glass fiber detectors makes use of neutron capture by ^{6}Li. Unlike scintillating glass fiber detectors however the ^{6}Li is part of the crystalline structure of the scintillator giving it a naturally high ^{6}Li density. A doping agent is added to provide the crystal with its scintillating properties, two common doping agents are trivalent cerium and divalent europium. Europium doped LiCaAlF_{6} has the advantage over other materials that the number of optical photons produced per neutron capture is around 30.000 which is 5 times higher than for example in neutron-sensitive scintillating glass fibers. This property makes neutron photon discrimination easier. Due to its high ^{6}Li density this material is suitable for producing light weight compact neutron detectors, as a result LiCaAlF_{6} has been used for neutron detection at high altitudes on balloon missions. The long decay time of Eu^{2+} doped LiCaAlF_{6} makes it less suitable for measurements in high radiation environments, the Ce^{3+} doped variant has a shorter decay time but suffers from a lower light-yield.

==== NaIL Dual Detection Neutron-Gamma Scintillator ====
Sodium Iodide crystal co-doped with Thallium and Lithium [NaI(Tl+Li)] a.k.a. NaIL has the ability to detect Gamma radiation and Thermal Neutrons in a single crystal with exceptional Pulse-shape Discrimination.The use of low ^{6}Li concentrations in NaIL and large thicknesses can achieve the same neutron detection capabilities as 3He or CLYC or CLLB detectors at a lower cost.^{6}Li (95% enriched) co-doping introduces efficient thermal neutron detection to the most established gamma-ray scintillator while retaining the favorable scintillation properties of standard NaI(Tl). NaIL can provide large volume, single material detectors for both gammas and neutrons at a low price per volume.

=== Semiconductor neutron detectors ===
There are two basic types of semiconductor neutron detectors, the first being electron devices coated with a neutron reactive material and the second being a semiconductor being partly composed of neutron reactive material. The most successful of these configurations is the coated device type, and an example would be a common planar Si diode coated with either ^{10}B or ^{6}LiF. This type of detector was first proposed by Babcock et al. The concept is straightforward. A neutron is absorbed in the reactive film and spontaneously emits energetic reaction products. A reaction product may reach the semiconductor surface, and upon entering the semiconductor produces electron-hole pairs. Under a reverse bias voltage, these electrons and holes are drifted through the diode to produce an induced current, usually integrated in pulse mode to form a voltage output. The maximum intrinsic efficiency for single-coated devices is approximately 5% for thermal neutrons (0.0259 eV), and the design and operation are thoroughly described in the literature. The neutron detection efficiency limitation is a consequence of reaction-product self-absorption. For instance, the range in a boron film of 1.47 MeV α particles from the ^{10}B(n,α) ^{7}Li reaction is approximately 4.5 microns, and the range in LiF of 2.7 MeV tritons from the ^{10}B(n,α) ^{7}Li reaction is approximately 28 microns. Reaction products originating at distances further from the film/semiconductor interface can not reach the semiconductor surface, and consequently will not contribute to neutron detection. Devices coated with natural Gd have also been explored, mainly because of its large thermal neutron microscopic cross section of 49,000 barns. However, the Gd(n,γ) reaction products of interest are mainly low energy conversion electrons, mostly grouped around 70 keV. Consequently, discrimination between neutron induced events and gamma-ray events (mainly producing Compton scattered electrons) is difficult for Gd-coated semiconductor diodes. A compensated pixel design sought to remedy the problem. Overall, devices coated with either ^{10}B or ^{6}LiF are preferred mainly because the energetic charged-particle reaction products are much easier to discriminate from background radiations.

The low efficiency of coated planar diodes led to the development of microstructured semiconductor neutron detectors (MSND). These detectors have microscopic structures etched into a semiconductor substrate, subsequently formed into a pin style diode. The microstructures are backfilled with neutron reactive material, usually ^{6}LiF, although ^{10}B has been used. The increased semiconductor surface area adjacent to the reactive material and the increased probability that a reaction product will enter the semiconductor greatly increase the intrinsic neutron detection efficiency.

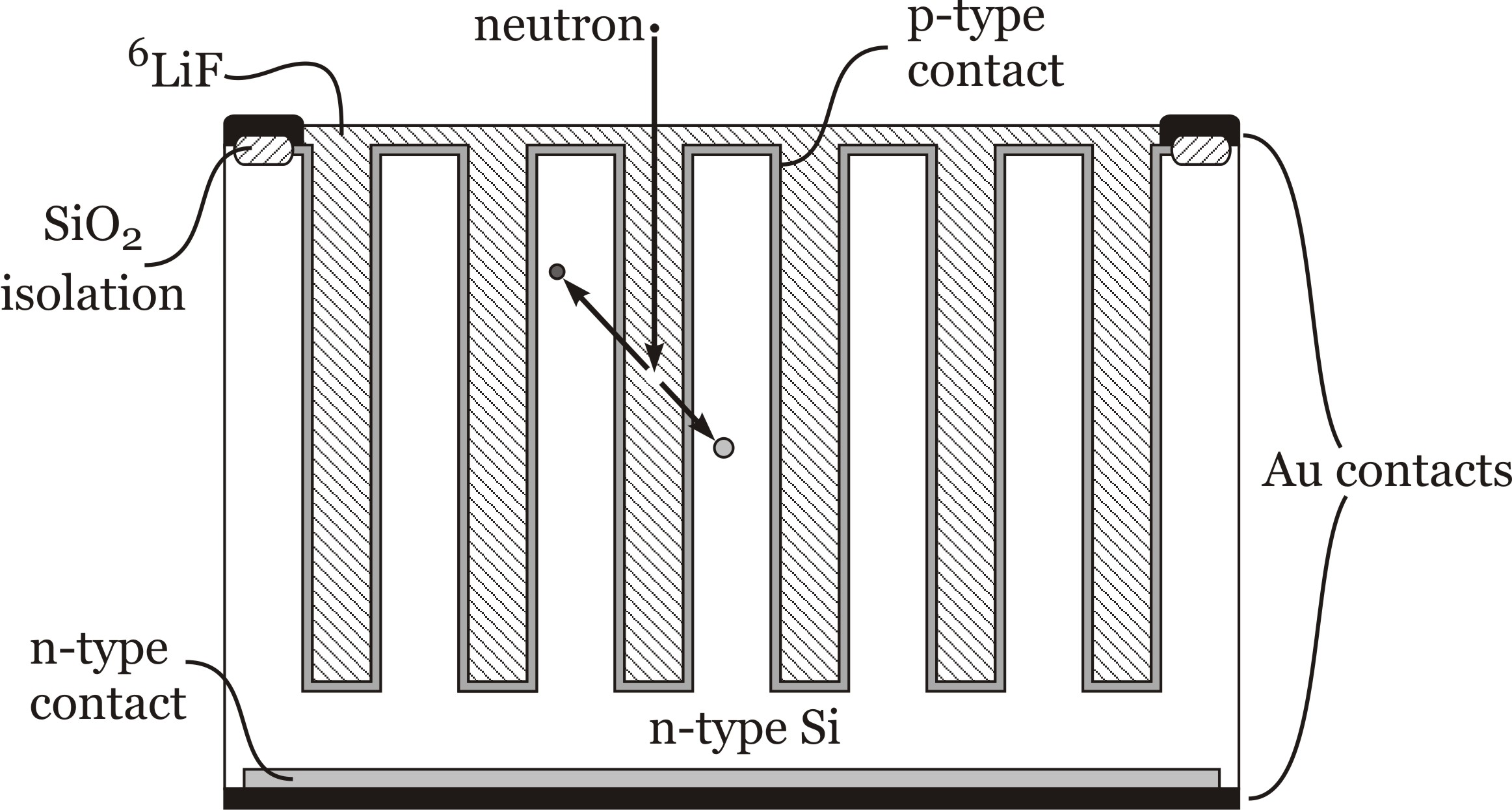
Basic design of a microstructured semiconductor neutron detector (MSND).

The MSND device configuration was first proposed by Muminov and Tsvang, and later by Schelten et al. It was years later when the first working example of a MSND was fabricated and demonstrated , then having only 3.3% thermal neutron detection efficiency. Since that initial work, MSNDs have achieved greater than 30% thermal neutron detection efficiency. Although MSNDs can operate on the built-in potential (zero applied voltage), they perform best when 2-3 volts are applied. There are several groups now working on MSND variations. The most successful types are the variety backfilled with ^{6}LiF material. MSNDs are now manufactured and sold commercially by Radiation Detection Technologies, Inc. Advanced experimental versions of double-sided MSNDs with opposing microstructures on both sides of a semiconductor wafer have been reported with over 65% thermal neutron detection efficiency, and are theoretically capable of over 70% efficiency.

Semiconductor detectors in which one of more constituent atoms are neutron reactive are called bulk semiconductor neutron detectors. Bulk solid-state neutron detectors can be divided into two basic categories: those that rely on the detection of charged-particle reaction products and those that rely on the detection of prompt capture gamma rays. In general, this type of neutron detector is difficult to make reliably and presently are not commercially available.

The bulk materials that rely upon charged-particle emissions are based on boron and lithium containing semiconductors. In the search for bulk semiconductor neutron detectors, the boron-based materials, such as BP, BAs, BN, and B_{4}C, have been investigated more than other potential materials.

Boron-based semiconductors in cubic form are difficult to grow as bulk crystals, mainly because they require high temperatures and high pressure for synthesis. BP and BAs can decompose into undesirable crystal structures (cubic to icosahedral form) unless synthesized under high pressure. B_{4}C also forms icosahedral units in a rhombohedral crystal structure, an undesirable transformation because the icosahedral structure has relatively poor charge collection properties which make these icosahedral forms unsuitable for neutron detection.

BN can be formed as either simple hexagonal, cubic (zincblende) or wurtzite crystals, depending on the growth temperature, and it is usually grown by thin film methods. It is the simple hexagonal form of BN that has been most studied as a neutron detector. Thin film chemical vapor deposition methods are usually employed to produce BP, BAs, BN, or B_{4}C. These boron-based films are often grown upon n-type Si substrates, which can form a p–n junction with the Si and, therefore, produce a coated Si diode as described at the beginning of this section. Consequently, the neutron response from the device can be easily mistaken as a bulk response when it is actually a coated diode response. To date, there is sparse evidence of boron-based semiconductors producing intrinsic neutron signals.

Li-containing semiconductors, categorized as Nowotny–Juza compounds, have also been investigated as bulk neutron detectors. The Nowotny–Juza compound LiZnAs has been demonstrated as a neutron detector; however, the material is difficult and expensive to synthesize, and only small semiconductor crystals have been reported. Finally, traditional semiconductor materials with neutron reactive dopants have been investigated, namely, Si(Li) detectors. Neutrons interact with the lithium dopant in the material and produce energetic reaction products. However, the dopant concentration is relatively low in Li drifted Si detectors (or other doped semiconductors), typically less than 10^{19} cm^{−3}. For a degenerate concentration of Li on the order of 10^{19} cm^{−3}, a 5-cm thick block of natural Si(Li) would have less than 1% thermal-neutron detection efficiency, while a 5-cm thick block of a Si(^{6}Li) detector would have only 4.6% thermal-neutron detection efficiency.

Prompt gamma-ray emitting semiconductors, such as CdTe, and HgI_{2} have been successfully used as neutron detectors. These detectors rely upon the prompt gamma-ray emissions from the ^{113}Cd(n, γ)^{114}Cd reaction (producing 558.6 keV and 651.3 keV gamma rays) and the ^{199}Hg(n, γ) ^{200}Hg reaction (producing 368.1 keV and 661.1 keV gamma rays). However, these semiconductor materials are designed for use as gamma-ray spectrometers and, hence, are intrinsically sensitive to the gamma-ray background. With adequate energy resolution, pulse height discrimination can be used to separate the prompt gamma-ray emissions from neutron interactions. However, the effective neutron detection efficiency is compromised because of the relatively small Compton ratio. In other words, the majority of events add to the Compton continuum rather than to the full energy peak, thus, making discrimination between neutrons and background gamma rays difficult. Also, both natural Cd and Hg have relatively large thermal-neutron (n,γ) cross sections of 2444 b and 369.8 b, respectively. Consequently, most thermal neutrons are absorbed near the detector surface so that nearly half of the prompt gamma rays are emitted in directions away from the detector bulk and, thus, produce poor gamma-ray reabsorption or interaction efficiency.

=== Neutron activation detectors ===
Activation samples may be placed in a neutron field to characterize the energy spectrum and intensity of the neutrons. Activation reactions that have differing energy thresholds can be used including ^{56}Fe(n,p) ^{56}Mn, ^{27}Al(n,α)^{24}Na, ^{93}Nb(n,2n) ^{92m}Nb, & ^{28}Si(n,p)^{28}Al.

=== Fast neutron detectors ===
Fast neutrons are often detected by first moderating (slowing) them to thermal energies. However, during that process the information on the original energy of the neutron, its direction of travel, and the time of emission is lost. For many applications, the detection of "fast" neutrons that retain this information is highly desirable.

Typical fast neutron detectors are liquid scintillators, 4-He based noble gas detectors and plastic detectors. Fast neutron detectors differentiate themselves from one another by their (1) capability of neutron/gamma discrimination (through pulse shape discrimination) and (2) sensitivity. The capability to distinguish between neutrons and gammas is excellent in noble gas based 4-He detectors due to their low electron density and excellent pulse shape discrimination property. In fact, inorganic scintillators such as zinc sulfide has been shown to exhibit large differences in their decay times for protons and electrons; a feature that has been exploited by combining the inorganic crystal with a neutron converter (such as polymethyl methacrylate) in the Micro-Layered Fast-Neutron Detector. Such detection systems are capable of selectively detecting only fast neutrons in a mixed neutron-gamma radiation field without requiring any additional discrimination techniques such as pulse shape discrimination.

Detection of fast neutrons poses a range of special problems. A directional fast-neutron detector has been developed using multiple proton recoils in separated planes of plastic scintillator material. The paths of the recoil nuclei created by neutron collision are recorded; determination of the energy and momentum of two recoil nuclei allow calculation of the direction of travel and energy of the neutron that underwent elastic scattering with them.

=== Passive neutron detectors ===
Solid-state nuclear track detectors (SSNTDs) provide a passive, integrating alternative to active neutron detectors. The most common material is CR-39, a polymer (poly allyl diglycol carbonate) in which charged particles break chemical bonds along their path, creating latent damage trails. Subsequent chemical etching, typically in sodium hydroxide solution, enlarges these trails into pits that can be counted under an optical or scanning electron microscope. Because they require no power, high voltage, or readout electronics during exposure, SSNTDs are widely used in personnel neutron dosimetry and in environments where active instrumentation is impractical.

CR-39 does not respond to neutrons directly, as neutrons are uncharged. Fast neutrons are registered indirectly through elastic scattering from hydrogen nuclei in the polymer, producing recoil protons that form tracks. Slow and thermal neutrons produce no such recoils and instead require a converter layer that transforms neutrons into charged particles. The standard approach uses a boron-bearing converter, exploiting the large thermal-neutron capture cross section of ^{10}B via the ^{10}B(n,α)^{7}Li reaction; boron nitride was identified as an effective converter material as early as the 1980s owing to its high boron content and smooth surface. Pairing a boron-coated detector with an uncoated control allows the slow-neutron contribution to be separated from background tracks arising from charged particles and fast neutrons.

== Applications ==
Neutron detection is used for varying purposes. Each application has different requirements for the detection system.

- Reactor instrumentation: Since reactor power is essentially linearly proportional to the neutron flux, neutron detectors provide an important measure of power in nuclear power and research reactors. Boiling water reactors may have dozens of neutron detectors, one per fuel assembly. Most neutron detectors used in thermal-spectrum nuclear reactors are optimized to detect thermal neutrons.
- Plasma physics: Neutron detection is used in fusion plasma physics experiments such as JET. For example, the detected neutron rate from a plasma can give information about the ion temperature.
- Particle physics: Neutron detection has been proposed as a method of enhancing neutrino detectors.
- Materials science: Elastic and inelastic neutron scattering enables experimentalists to characterize the morphology of materials from scales ranging from ångströms to about one micrometer.
- Radiation safety: Neutron radiation is a hazard associated with neutron sources, space travel, accelerators and nuclear reactors. Neutron detectors used for radiation safety must take into account the relative biological effectiveness (i.e., the way damage caused by neutrons varies with energy).
- Cosmic ray detection: Secondary neutrons are one component of particle showers produced in Earth's atmosphere by cosmic rays. Dedicated ground-level neutron detectors, namely neutron monitors, are employed to monitor variations in cosmic ray flux.
- Special nuclear material detection: Special nuclear materials (SNM) such as uranium-233 and plutonium-239 decay by spontaneous fission, yielding neutrons. Neutrons detectors can be used for monitor for SNM in commerce.

== Experimental neutron detection ==
Experiments that make use of this science include scattering experiments in which neutrons directed and then scattered from a sample are to be detected. Facilities include the ISIS neutron source at the Rutherford Appleton Laboratory, the Spallation Neutron Source at the Oak Ridge National Laboratory, and the Spallation Neutron Source (SINQ) at the Paul Scherrer Institute, in which the neutrons are produced by spallation reaction, and the traditional research reactor facilities in which neutrons are produced during fission of uranium isotopes. Noteworthy among the various neutron detection experiments is the trademark experiment of the European Muon Collaboration, first performed at CERN and now termed the "EMC experiment." The same experiment is performed today with more sophisticated equipment to obtain more definite results related to the original EMC effect.

=== Challenges in neutron detection in an experimental environment ===
Neutron detection in an experimental environment is not an easy science. The major challenges faced by modern-day neutron detection include background noise, high detection rates, neutron neutrality, and low neutron energies.

==== Background noise ====
The main components of background noise in neutron detection are high-energy photons, which aren't easily eliminated by physical barriers. The other sources of noise, such as alpha and beta particles, can be eliminated by various shielding materials, such as lead, plastic, thermo-coal, etc. Thus, photons cause major interference in neutron detection, since it is uncertain if neutrons or photons are being detected by the neutron detector. Both register similar energies after scattering into the detector from the target or ambient light, and are thus hard to distinguish. Coincidence detection can also be used to discriminate real neutron events from photons and other radiation.

==== High detection rates ====
If the detector lies in a region of high beam activity, it is hit continuously by neutrons and background noise at overwhelmingly high rates. This obfuscates collected data, since there is extreme overlap in measurement, and separate events are not easily distinguished from each other. Thus, part of the challenge lies in keeping detection rates as low as possible and in designing a detector that can keep up with the high rates to yield coherent data.

==== Neutrality of neutrons ====
Neutrons are neutral and thus do not respond to electric fields. This makes it hard to direct their course towards a detector to facilitate detection. Neutrons also do not ionize atoms except by direct collision, so gaseous ionization detectors are ineffective.

==== Varying behavior with energy ====
Detectors relying on neutron absorption are generally more sensitive to low-energy thermal neutrons, and are orders of magnitude less sensitive to high-energy neutrons. Scintillation detectors, on the other hand, have trouble registering the impacts of low-energy neutrons.

=== Experimental setup and method ===
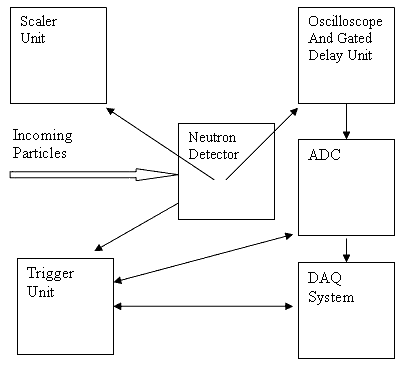
Figure 1: The experimental setup

Figure 1 shows the typical main components of the setup of a neutron detection unit. In principle, the diagram shows the setup as it would be in any modern particle physics lab, but the specifics describe the setup in Jefferson Lab (Newport News, Virginia).

In this setup, the incoming particles, comprising neutrons and photons, strike the neutron detector; this is typically a scintillation detector consisting of scintillating material, a waveguide, and a photomultiplier tube (PMT), and will be connected to a data acquisition (DAQ) system to register detection details.

The detection signal from the neutron detector is connected to the scaler unit, gated delay unit, trigger unit and the oscilloscope. The scaler unit is merely used to count the number of incoming particles or events. It does so by incrementing its tally of particles every time it detects a surge in the detector signal from the zero-point. There is very little dead time in this unit, implying that no matter how fast particles are coming in, it is very unlikely for this unit to fail to count an event (e.g. incoming particle). The low dead time is due to sophisticated electronics in this unit, which take little time to recover from the relatively easy task of registering a logical high every time an event occurs. The trigger unit coordinates all the electronics of the system and gives a logical high to these units when the whole setup is ready to record an event run.

The oscilloscope registers a current pulse with every event. The pulse is merely the ionization current in the detector caused by this event plotted against time. The total energy of the incident particle can be found by integrating this current pulse with respect to time to yield the total charge deposited at the end of the PMT. This integration is carried out in the analog-digital converter (ADC). The total deposited charge is a direct measure of the energy of the ionizing particle (neutron or photon) entering the neutron detector. This signal integration technique is an established method for measuring ionization in the detector in nuclear physics. The ADC has a higher dead time than the oscilloscope, which has limited memory and needs to transfer events quickly to the ADC. Thus, the ADC samples out approximately one in every 30 events from the oscilloscope for analysis. Since the typical event rate is around 10^{6} neutrons every second, this sampling will still accumulate thousands of events every second.

=== Separating neutrons from photons ===
The ADC sends its data to a DAQ unit that sorts the data in presentable form for analysis. The key to further analysis lies in the difference between the shape of the photon ionization-current pulse and that of the neutron. The photon pulse is longer at the ends (or "tails") whereas the neutron pulse is well-centered. This fact can be used to identify incoming neutrons and to count the total rate of incoming neutrons. The steps leading to this separation (those that are usually performed at leading national laboratories, Jefferson Lab specifically among them) are gated pulse extraction and plotting-the-difference.

==== Gated pulse extraction ====
Ionization current signals are all pulses with a local peak in between. Using a logical AND gate in continuous time (having a stream of "1" and "0" pulses as one input and the current signal as the other), the tail portion of every current pulse signal is extracted. This gated discrimination method is used on a regular basis on liquid scintillators. The gated delay unit is precisely to this end, and makes a delayed copy of the original signal in such a way that its tail section is seen alongside its main section on the oscilloscope screen.

After extracting the tail, the usual current integration is carried out on both the tail section and the complete signal. This yields two ionization values for each event, which are stored in the event table in the DAQ system.

==== Plotting the difference ====
Figure 2: Expected plot of tail energy against energy in the complete pulse plotted for all event energies. Dots represent number densities of events.

In this step lies the crucial point of the analysis: the extracted ionization values are plotted. Specifically, the graph plots energy deposition in the tail against energy deposition in the entire signal for a range of neutron energies. Typically, for a given energy, there are many events with the same tail-energy value. In this case, plotted points are simply made denser with more overlapping dots on the two-dimensional plot, and can thus be used to eyeball the number of events corresponding to each energy-deposition. A considerable random fraction (1/30) of all events is plotted on the graph.

If the tail size extracted is a fixed proportion of the total pulse, then there will be two lines on the plot, having different slopes. The line with the greater slope will correspond to photon events and the line with the lesser slope to neutron events. This is precisely because the photon energy deposition current, plotted against time, leaves a longer "tail" than does the neutron deposition plot, giving the photon tail more proportion of the total energy than neutron tails.

The effectiveness of any detection analysis can be seen by its ability to accurately count and separate the number of neutrons and photons striking the detector. Also, the effectiveness of the second and third steps reveals whether event rates in the experiment are manageable. If clear plots can be obtained in the above steps, allowing for easy neutron-photon separation, the detection can be termed effective and the rates manageable. On the other hand, smudging and indistinguishability of data points will not allow for easy separation of events.

=== Rate control ===
Detection rates can be kept low in many ways. Sampling of events can be used to choose only a few events for analysis. If the rates are so high that one event cannot be distinguished from another, physical experimental parameters (shielding, detector-target distance, solid-angle, etc.) can be manipulated to give the lowest rates possible and thus distinguishable events.

=== Finer detection points ===
It is important here to observe precisely those variables that matter, since there may be false indicators along the way. For example, ionization currents might get periodic high surges, which do not imply high rates but just high energy depositions for stray events. These surges will be tabulated and viewed with cynicism if unjustifiable, especially since there is so much background noise in the setup.

One might ask how experimenters can be sure that every current pulse in the oscilloscope corresponds to exactly one event. This is true because the pulse lasts about 50 ns, allowing for a maximum of 2×10^{7} events every second. This number is much higher than the actual typical rate, which is usually an order of magnitude less, as mentioned above. This means that is it highly unlikely for there to be two particles generating one current pulse. The current pulses last 50 ns each, and start to register the next event after a gap from the previous event.

Although sometimes facilitated by higher incoming neutron energies, neutron detection is generally a difficult task, for all the reasons stated earlier. Thus, better scintillator design is also in the foreground and has been the topic of pursuit ever since the invention of scintillation detectors. Scintillation detectors were invented in 1903 by Crookes but were not very efficient until the PMT (photomultiplier tube) was developed by Curran and Baker in 1944. The PMT gives a reliable and efficient method of detection since it can multiply the initial signal of a single scintillation photon hitting the PMT face millions of times into a measurable electrical pulse. Even so, scintillator detector design has room for improvement as do other options for neutron detection besides scintillation.

== See also ==
- Bonner sphere – tool for determining neutron energies
- Nested Neutron Spectrometer – A field portable neutron spectrometer based on the Bonner sphere principle
- Large Area Neutron Detector
- Neutron probe
- Anger camera – position sensitive neutron detectors are developed using technologies of the Anger camera
- Microchannel plate detector – position sensitive neutron detectors are developed using technologies of the microchannel plate detector
