= Bonner (surname) =

Bonner is an Irish surname, found mostly in County Donegal. Outside of Ireland, it may also be of separate English and German origin. Notable people with the name include:

- Anthony Bonner (born 1968), American basketball player
- Antoinette Bonner (1892–1920), Romanian American jewel thief
- Bill Bonner (author) (born 1948), American finance writer
- Bill Bonner (politician), Canadian politician
- Charles George Bonner (1884–1951), English recipient of the Victoria Cross
- Cornelius Bonner (born 1976), American football player
- Dave Bonner (born 1940), American politician
- DeWanna Bonner (born 1987), American-Macedonian basketball player
- Edmund Bonner (died 1569), English bishop
- Enda Bonner (born 1949), Irish politician
- Ethan Bonner (born 1999), American football player
- Frank Bonner (1942–2021), American actor
- Frank Bonner (baseball) (1869–1905), American baseball player
- Gemma Bonner (born 1991), English footballer
- George Wilmot Bonner (1796–1836), British wood engraver
- Gerald Bonner (chess player) (born 1941), Scottish chess master
- Henry Derek Elis (born 1978), American singer, born Henry Derek Bonner
- Herbert Covington Bonner (1891–1965), American politician
- Hilary Bonner (born 1950), British writer
- Isabel Bonner (1907–1955), American stage actress
- Jennifer Bonner (born 1979), American architect
- Jill Bonner (1937–2021), British-American physicist
- Jo Bonner (born 1959), American politician
- Joe Bonner (1948–2014), American jazz pianist
- John Tyler Bonner (1920–2019), American biologist
- Judy L. Bonner, American academic, president of the University of Alabama
- Juke Boy Bonner (1932–1978), American blues musician
- Kevin Bonner, Irish Gaelic footballer
- Leroy "Sugarfoot" Bonner (1943–2013), American musician
- Mark Bonner (footballer) (born 1974), English footballer
- Mark Bonner (football manager) (born 1985), English football coach
- Matt Bonner (born 1980), American basketball player
- Michelle Bonner (born 1972), sports anchor
- Neville Bonner (1922–1999), Australian politician
- Nigel Bonner (1928–1994), British zoologist and Antarctic marine mammal specialist
- Nina Bonner (born 1972), Australian field hockey player
- Nkrumah Bonner (born 1989), Jamaican cricketer
- Packie Bonner (born 1960), Irish footballer
- Richell Bonner (born 1971), reggae artist known as Richie Spice
- Sherdrick Bonner (born 1968), American football player
- Teneisha Bonner (1981–2019), Jamaican-born English dancer
- Tom Bonner (born 1988), Scottish footballer
- Tom W. Bonner (1910–1961), American experimental physicist
- Tony Bonner (born 1943), Australian actor
- William Ray Bonner (1948–2022), American perpetrator of a shooting spree in Los Angeles
- Yelena Bonner (1923–2011), Russian dissident, widow of Andrei Sakharov
- Zach Bonner (born 1997), founder of Little Red Wagon Foundation, Inc.

False cognates:

- William Bonner (newscaster) (born 1963), Brazilian newscaster, publicist and journalist. William's original surname is Bonemer which is a lebanese surname while Bonner is part of his stage name.

== See also ==
- Bonner (disambiguation)
- Bonar (name)
