= Bonner =

Bonner may refer to:

== People ==
- Bonner (name)

== Places ==
United States

- Bonner Springs, Kansas
- Bonner County, Idaho
- Bonners Ferry, Idaho
- Bonner-West Riverside, Montana
- Bonner, Nebraska

Australia

- Bonner, Australian Capital Territory, suburb of Canberra
- Division of Bonner, electoral district in Queensland

Other

- Bonnerveen, Dutch town, Netherlands
- Bonner Beach, a beach in the UK island of South Georgia

== Other uses ==
- A resident of Bonn
- Junior Bonner, 1972 western movie
- Bonner Foundation, scholarship programme
- Bonner Platz (Munich U-Bahn), U-Bahn station
- Bonner SC, German football club
- Bonner Durchmusterung, star catalog
- Bonner spheres, used to determine the energy spectra of a neutron beam
- Bonners Ferry High School, high school in Bonners Ferry, Idaho
- Monsignor Bonner High School, Catholic secondary school in Drexel Hill, Pennsylvania
- Tom W. Bonner Prize in Nuclear Physics
