= Owen Richardson =

British physicist (1879–1959)

Sir Owen Richardson FRS
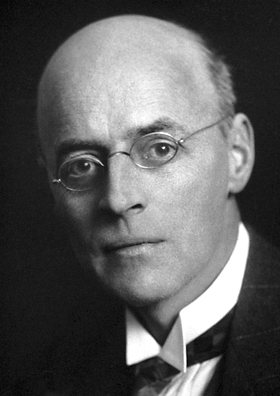
- Richardson in 1928
- Born: Owen Willans Richardson; 26 April 1879; Dewsbury, England
- Died: 15 February 1959 (aged 79); Alton, Hampshire, England
- Resting place: Brookwood Cemetery
- Education: University of Cambridge (BA); University of London (DSc)
- Known for: Richardson's law Einstein–de Haas effect
- Spouses: Lilian Maud Wilson (m. 1906; died 1945) Henriette Rupp (m. 1948)
- Children: 3
- Awards: Hughes Medal (1920); Nobel Prize in Physics (1928); Royal Medal (1930)
- Scientific career
- Fields: Physics
- Workplaces: Princeton University; King's College London
- Academic advisors: J. J. Thomson
- Doctoral students: Karl Compton; Clinton Davisson; Ali Moustafa Mosharafa

Sir Owen Willans Richardson (26 April 1879 – 15 February 1959) was a British physicist who received the 1928 Nobel Prize in Physics for his work on thermionic emission and for the discovery of Richardson's law.

== Biography ==
Owen Willans Richardson was born on 26 April 1879 in Dewsbury, England, the only son of Charlotte Maria (née Willans) and Joshua Henry Richardson. Richardson was educated at Batley Grammar School, before entering Trinity College, Cambridge, in 1897, where he gained first-class honours in Natural Science in 1900 and was elected a Fellow in 1902. He obtained a Doctor of Science from the University of London in 1904.

In 1906, Richardson was appointed Professor of Physics at Princeton University in the United States, a position he held until 1913. The following year, he returned to England to become Wheatstone Professor of Physics at King's College London, where he was later made Director of Research in 1924. He retired from King's College in 1944.

Richardson died on 15 February 1959 in Alton, Hampshire, at the age of 79. He is buried in Brookwood Cemetery (Plot 8) in Surrey.

== Research ==
In 1900, Richardson began researching the emission of electricity from hot bodies in the Cavendish Laboratory at Cambridge. The following year, he demonstrated that the current from a heated wire seemed to depend exponentially on the temperature of the wire with a mathematical form similar to the Arrhenius equation. This became known as Richardson's law: "If then the negative radiation is due to the electrons coming out of the metal, the saturation current s should obey the law $s = A\,T^{1/2}\,e^{-b/T}$."

Richardson also researched the photoelectric effect, the gyromagnetic effect, the emission of electrons by chemical reactions, soft X-rays, and the spectrum of hydrogen.

== Family ==
In 1906, Richardson married Lilian Maud Wilson, the sister of his Cavendish colleague, Harold Albert Wilson. They had two sons and a daughter.

Richardson had two sisters: Elizabeth Mary Dixon Richardson, who married the prominent mathematician Oswald Veblen; and Charlotte Sara Richardson, who married the American physicist (and 1937 Nobel laureate in Physics) Clinton Davisson, who was Richardson's Ph.D. student at Princeton. After Lilian's death in 1945, he was remarried in 1948 to Henriette Rupp, a physicist, previously married to Emil Rupp.

Richardson had a son, Harold Owen Richardson, who specialised in nuclear physics and was also the chairman of the Physics Department at Bedford College, London University, and later on became emeritus professor at London University.

== Recognition ==
=== Memberships ===
Year	Organisation	Type	Ref.
1910	American Philosophical Society	International Member	
1913	Royal Society	Fellow	

=== Awards ===
Year	Organisation	Award	Citation	Ref.
1920	Royal Society	Hughes Medal	"For his work in experimental physics, and especially thermionics."	
1928	Royal Swedish Academy of Sciences	Nobel Prize in Physics	"For his work on the thermionic phenomenon and especially for the discovery of the law named after him."	
1930	Royal Society	Royal Medal	"For his work on thermionics and spectroscopy."	

=== Honours ===
Year	Country	Honour	Ref.
1939	United Kingdom	Knight Bachelor	

== Works ==
- The emission of electricity from hot bodies (1st edition, 1916)
- The emission of electricity from hot bodies (2nd edition, 1921)
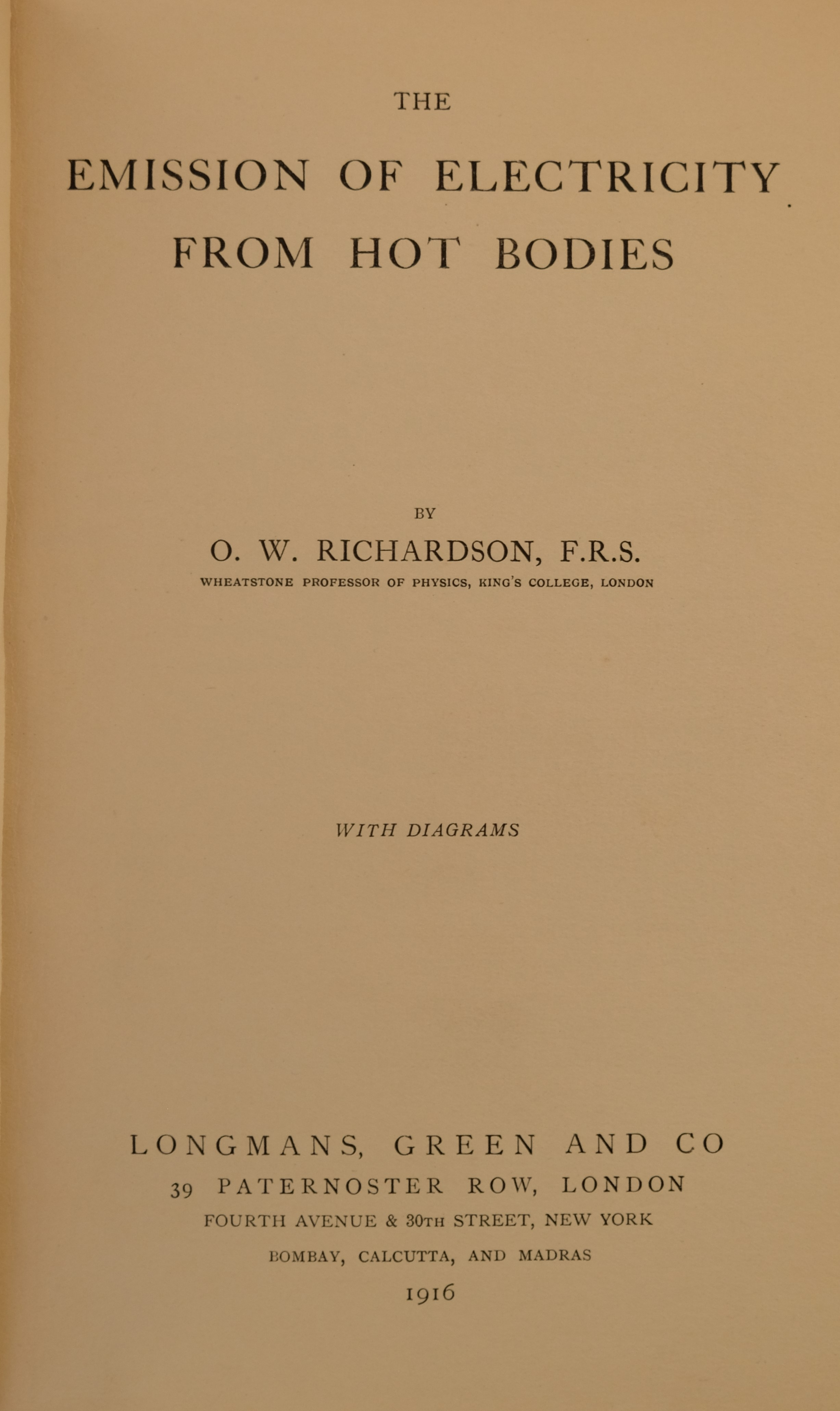
Title page to The emission of electricity from hot bodies (1916)

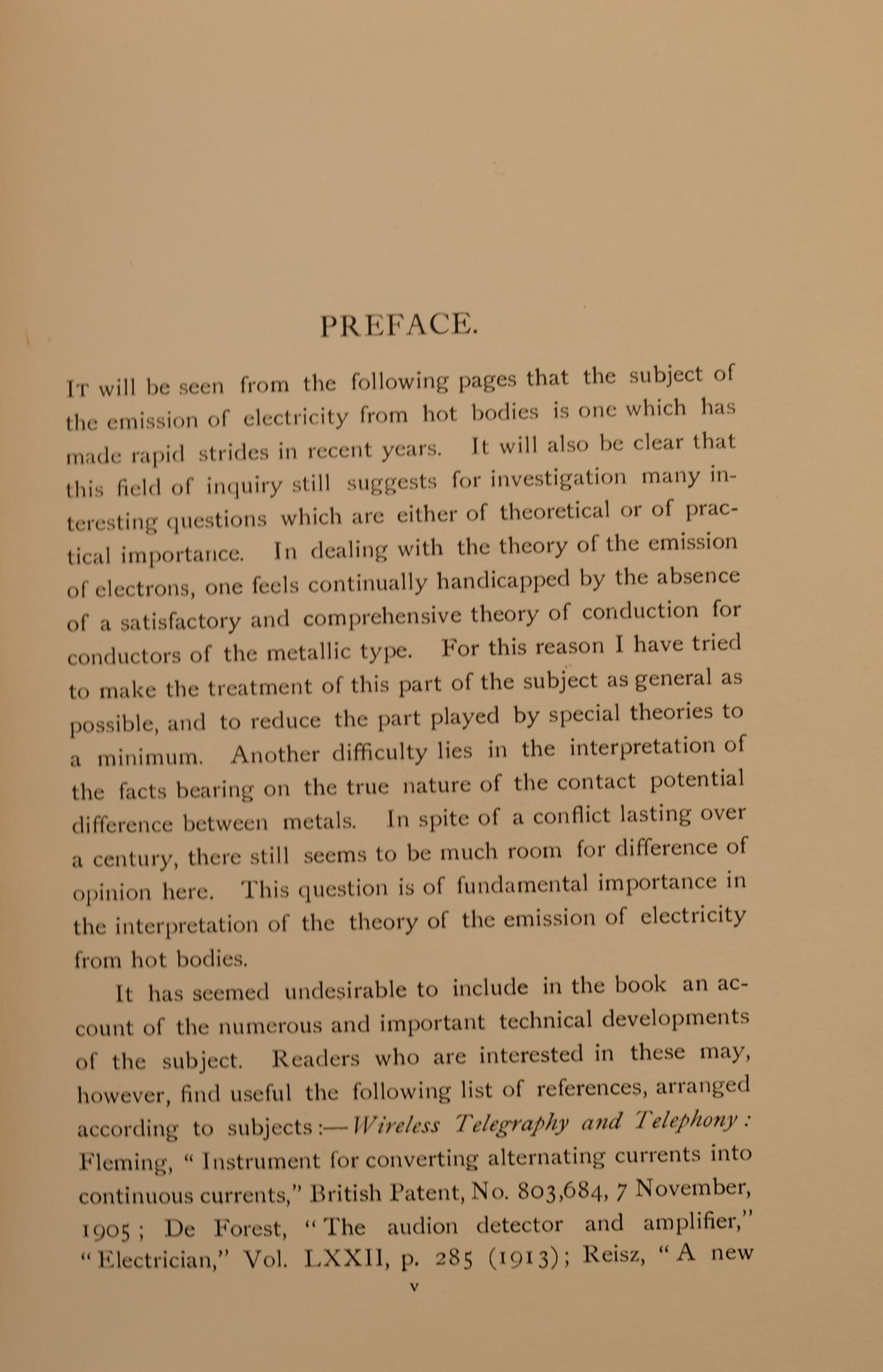
Preface to The emission of electricity from hot bodies (1916)

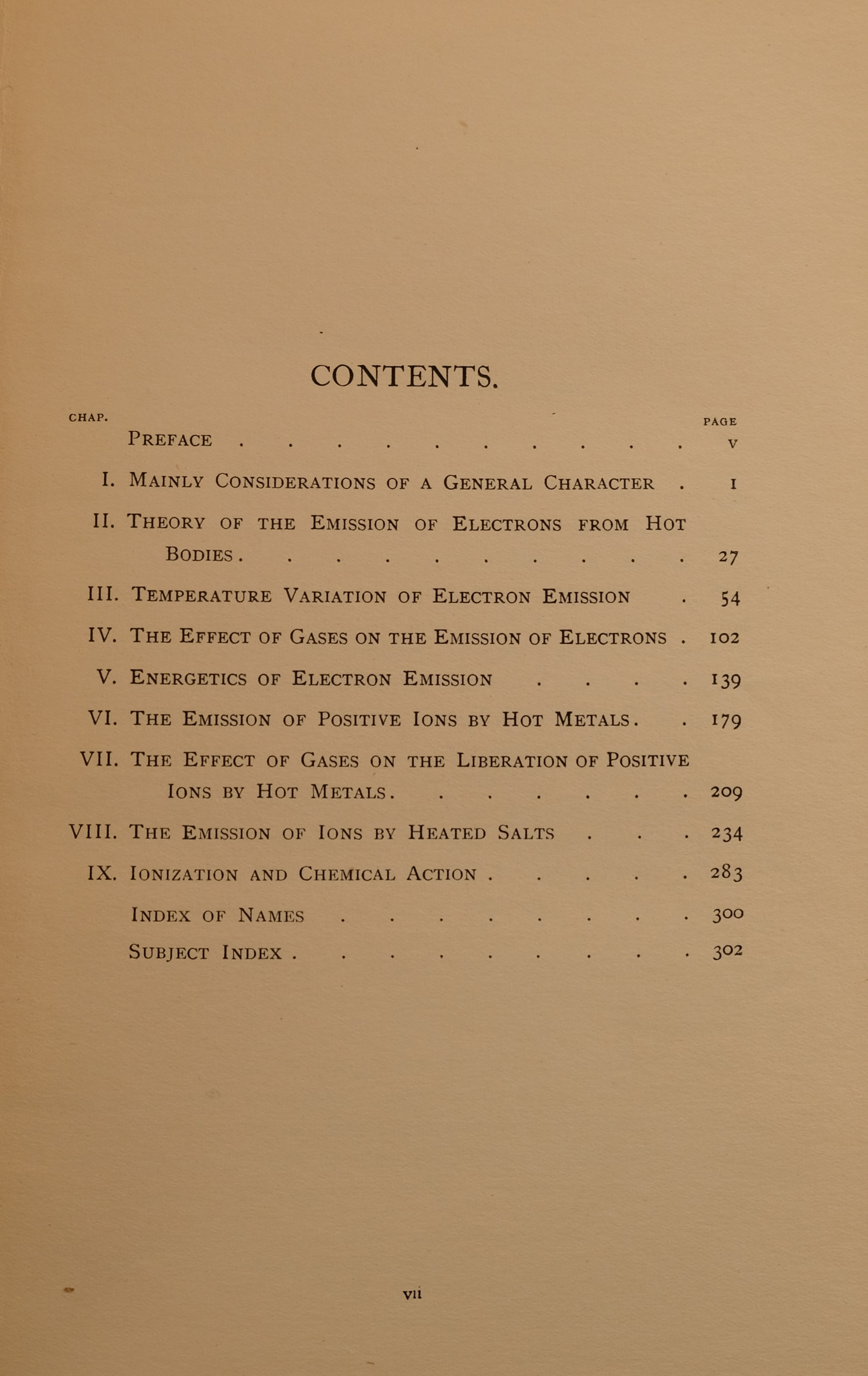
Table of contents to The emission of electricity from hot bodies (1916)

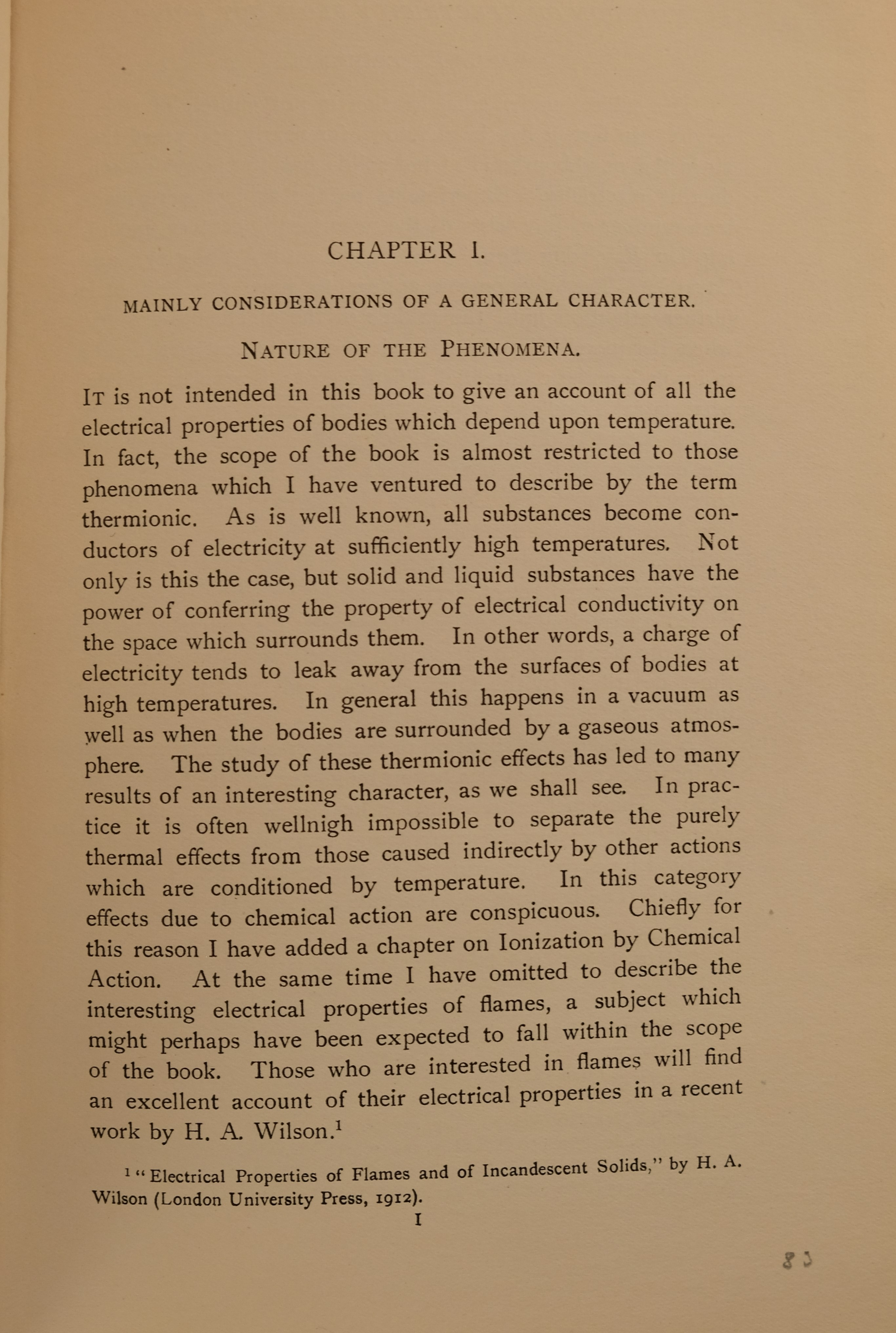
First page to The emission of electricity from hot bodies (1916)

== See also ==
- Alice Leigh-Smith
