= Tom W. Bonner =

American experimental physicist (1910–1961)

Tom Bonner
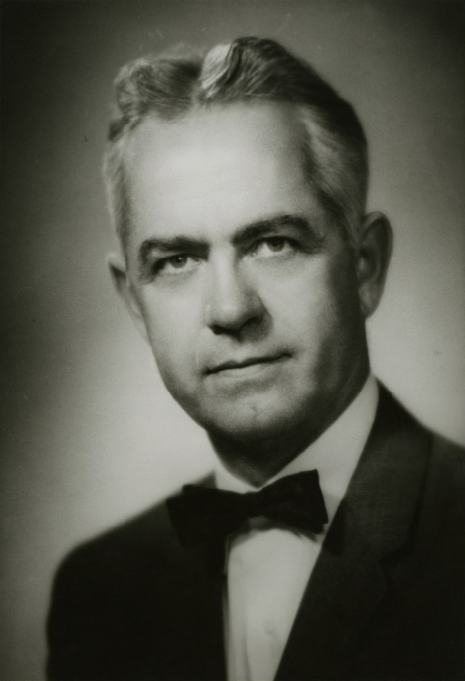
- Bonner in 1950
- Born: Tom Wilkerson Bonner; October 19, 1910; Greenville, Texas, US
- Died: December 6, 1961 (aged 51); Houston, Texas, US
- Education: Southern Methodist University (BS); Rice Institute (MA, PhD)
- Known for: Bonner sphere
- Spouse: Jara Prasilova (m. 1937)
- Children: 3
- Scientific career
- Fields: Nuclear physics
- Workplaces: California Institute of Technology (1934–36); Rice Institute (1936–61)
- Thesis: Collisions of Neutrons with Atomic Nuclei (1934)
- Doctoral advisor: Harold Albert Wilson

Tom Wilkerson Bonner (October 19, 1910 – December 6, 1961) was an American experimental physicist who developed important instruments and techniques for neutron physics and nuclear physics (Bonner sphere).

== Biography ==
Bonner received his B.S. from Southern Methodist University in 1931, and obtained M.A. and Ph.D. degrees from Rice Institute (now Rice University) in 1932 and 1934, respectively.

From 1934 to 1936, Bonner was a National Research Fellow at Caltech. In 1936, he returned to Rice Institute as Instructor in Physics. He was appointed Assistant Professor of Physics in 1938, Professor of Physics in 1945, and Chair of the Department of Physics in 1947. In the academic year 1938–1939, he was a Guggenheim Fellow in the Cavendish Laboratory at the University of Cambridge.

Bonner was elected a Fellow of the American Physical Society (APS) in 1941. From 1941 to 1945, he did radar research at the MIT Radiation Lab. Bonner was an associate editor of the Review of Scientific Instruments in 1946–1949 and in 1952–1955. He was an associate editor of Physical Review from 1951 until his death. In 1959, he was elected a Member of the National Academy of Sciences.

Bonner did important work in the development of high-pressure cloud chambers for the study of neutrons produced by accelerators. He invented a neutron-counter-ratio technique for the determination of neutron emission thresholds. He also invented a sphere-moderated neutron spectrometer.

In 1937, Bonner married Jara Prasilova, with whom he had three children.

Bonner died of acute myocardial infarction on December 6, 1961, in Houston, Texas, at the age of 51.

In 1964, the APS established the Tom W. Bonner Prize in Nuclear Physics in his memory.

== Patents and publications ==
- Bonner, T. W., & Brubaker, W. M. (1936). The disintegration of nitrogen by neutrons. Physical Review. 49(3): 223. doi:10.1103/PhysRev.49.223
- Bent, R. D., T. W. Bonner, and R. F. Sippel. (1955). "Pair Spectrometer Measurements of the Radiations from Excited States of Light Nuceli." Physical Review. 98(5): 1237. doi:10.1103/PhysRev.98.1237
- Bent, R. D., T. W. Bonner, J. H. McCrary, W. A. Ranken, and R. F. Sippel. (1955). "Gamma Rays from the Deuteron Bombardment of Be^{9}, B^{10}, N^{14}, and F1^{9}." Physical Review. 99(3): 710.doi:10.1103/PhysRev.99.710
- Taylor, H. L., Lönsjö, O., & Bonner, T. W. (1955). Nonelastic scattering cross sections for fast neutrons. Physical Review. 100(1): 174. doi:10.1103/PhysRev.100.174
- Bonner, T. W., and J. C. Slattery. (1959). "Nonelastic Scattering Cross Section for 8-20 Mev Neutrons." Physical Review. 113(4): 1088. doi:10.1103/PhysRev.113.1088
- Bramblett, Richard L., Ewing, Ronald I., & Bonner, T. W. (1960). A new type of neutron spectrometer. Nuclear Instruments and Methods, 9(1), 1-12. doi:10.1016/0029-554X(60)90043-4
- Bonner, T. W. (1961). Measurements of neutron spectra from fission. Nuclear Physics. 23, 116–121. doi:10.1016/0029-5582(61)90243-7
- Caldwell, R. L., & Bonner, T. W. (1961). Measurement of gamma ray energy due to inelastic neutron scattering. (No. GB 862434).
- Romain, F. S., Bonner, T. W., Bramblett, R. L., & Hanna, J. (1962). Low-Energy Neutrons from the Reaction Be 9 (α, n) C 12. Physical Review. 126(5): 1794.
- Bonner, T. W., & Mills, J. W. R. (1967). Semiconductor radiation detector for use in nuclear well logging. U.S. Patent No. 3,312,823. Washington, DC: U.S. Patent and Trademark Office.
