= Large-Area Neutron Detector =

The large-area neutron detector, also known as LAND, is the name of a detector of neutrons installed at GSI (Institute for Heavy Ion Research) in Arheilgen, close to the city of Darmstadt, Germany.

The detector is built of 10 planes with 20 paddles each. The paddles have a size of 10x10x200cm and are composed of a converter (iron) and plastic scintillator material. Within the paddle the 5 mm thick converters serve as a dense target for neutrons leading to processes that eject charged particles through the process of hadronic showers. The interspersed 5mm plastic scintillator stripes produce light from the passing charged particles. The stripes of one paddle are viewed at both ends by photomultipliers.

The detector system was built in 1990.

A research group at GSI is named after this detector. They study the nuclear structure of radioactive nuclei.

== See also ==
- Neutron detection
