= Harold Albert Wilson =

British–American physicist (1874–1964)

Harold Wilson FRS FRSE
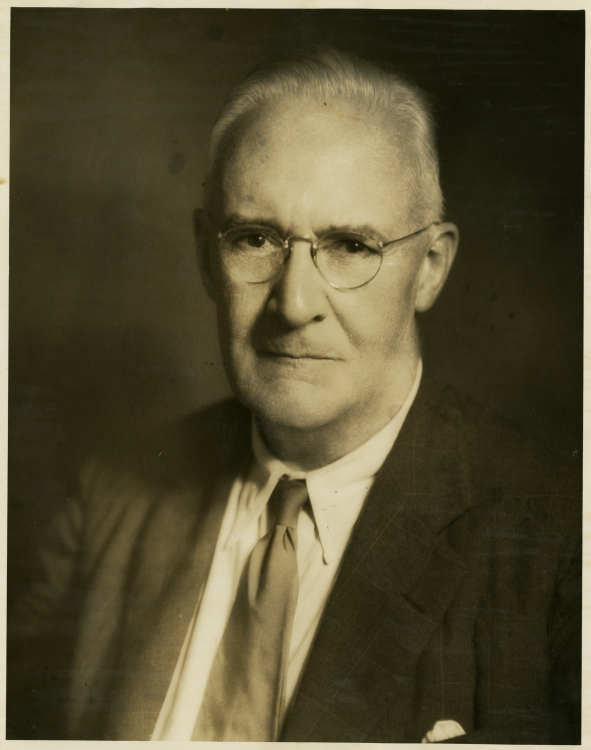
- Wilson in 1939
- Born: 1 December 1874; York, England, UKGBI
- Died: 13 October 1964 (aged 89); Houston, Texas, US
- Citizenship: United Kingdom; United States (from 1931)
- Education: St Olave's Grammar School
- Alma mater: Victoria University College; University of Cambridge (BA, MA)
- Spouse: Marjorie Smyth (m. 1912)
- Children: 4
- Relatives: Owen Richardson (brother-in-law)
- Awards: FRS (1906); FRSE (1925)
- Scientific career
- Fields: Physics
- Workplaces: King's College London (1904–09); McGill University (1909–12); Rice Institute (1912–47)
- Academic advisors: J. J. Thomson
- Doctoral students: Maurice Ewing (1931); Tom W. Bonner (1934)

Harold Albert Wilson (1 December 1874 – 13 October 1964) was a British–American physicist.

== Education ==
Harold Albert Wilson was born on 1 December 1874 in York, England, the son of Albert William Wilson, a goods manager with the North British Railway, and Anne Gill, the daughter of a farmer and innkeeper from Topcliffe.

Wilson was educated at St Olave's Grammar School. In 1893, he entered Victoria University College in Leeds, where he studied mathematics and science. He then enrolled at the University of Cambridge, and received a B.A. in 1899 and an M.A. in 1904.

In 1897, Wilson became a colleague of J. J. Thomson in the Cavendish Laboratory at Cambridge, and performed one of the earliest measurements of the electron's charge. He was elected a Fellow of Trinity College, Cambridge in October 1901. From 1901 to 1904, he held a Clerk Maxwell Studentship in the Cavendish Laboratory.

== Career ==
In 1904, Wilson became a lecturer in physics at King's College London, and was appointed professor and head of the Department of Physics the following year. In 1906, he was elected a Fellow of the Royal Society.

In 1909, Wilson accepted a role as Professor of Physics at McGill University in Montreal. In 1912, he joined the newly established Rice Institute (now Rice University) in Houston, becoming the first Chair of the Department of Physics. He was one of the original 12 founding professors. He was elected a Member of the American Philosophical Society in 1914.

In 1924, Wilson returned to the UK to spend a year at the University of Glasgow, where he was appointed Professor of Natural Philosophy. The following year, he was elected a Fellow of the Royal Society of Edinburgh. His proposers were Charles Barkla, Frederick Orpen Bower, John Walter Gregory, and John Graham Kerr.

In 1925, Wilson returned to Rice Institute, where he remained until his retirement in 1947. He became a naturalised US citizen in 1931.

Wilson died on 13 October 1964 in Houston at the age of 89.

== Family ==
In 1912, Wilson married Marjorie Patterson Smyth, with whom he had two sons and two daughters.

Harold had one sister, Lilian, who would marry physicist and Nobel laureate Owen Richardson.

== Honours ==
The Wilson Award at Rice University is named after him.

== Publications ==
- Electrical Conductivity of Flames (1912)
- Experimental Physics (1915)
- Modern Physics (1928)
- Mysteries of the Atom (1934)
