= Nested neutron spectrometer =

Tool used in physics research

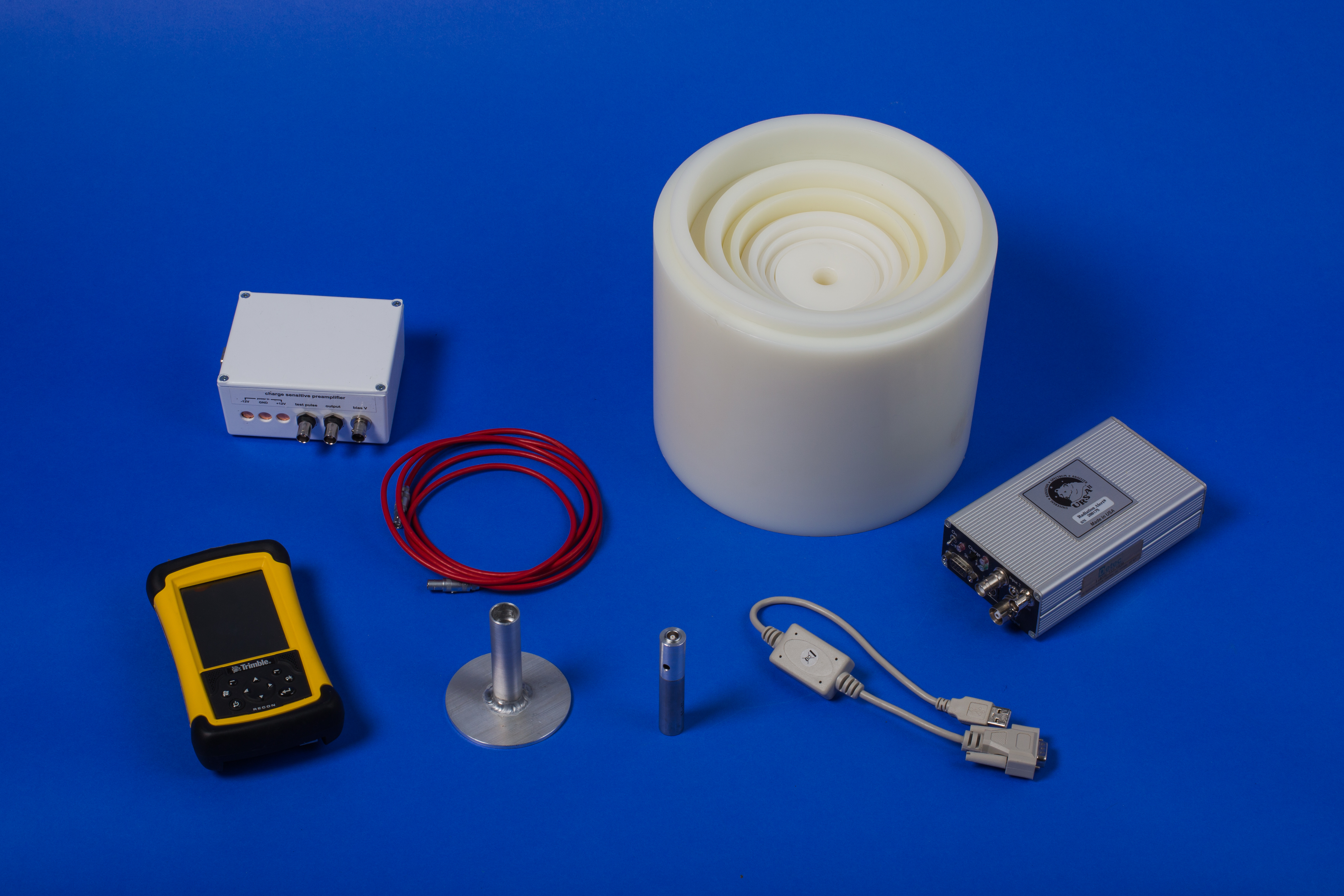
The components of a nested neutron spectrometer. Clockwise from top left: Pre-amp (white box), moderating cylinders (white cylinders), MCA (gray box), He-3 proportional counter and stand (metal cylinder), data acquisition computer (yellow), and assorted cables (red and grey).

The nested neutron spectrometer (NNS) is a tool used for neutron spectroscopy. The NNS is used to measure the energy spectrum of neutrons in a neutron field. This type of detector is used in both research facilities (for characterization of neutron fields) and workplaces, where neutron radiation may be encountered, for radiation protection purposes. Due to the difficulty associated with the detection of neutrons, the NNS is one of the few pieces of equipment capable of accurately determining the characteristics of a neutron field.

== Principles of operation ==
The NNS operates under the same principle as a Bonner sphere neutron spectrometer. The sensitive part of the spectrometer is the Helium-3 proportional counter, which detects neutrons through the reaction ^{3}He(n,p)^{3}H. This particular reaction has a significant cross-section only at thermal neutron energies. In order for a higher energy neutrons to be detected their energies must be decreased, or "moderated". To slow down neutrons at higher energies the NNS uses different amounts of high-density polyethylene (HDPE). The He-3 proportional counter is surrounded by varying amounts of HDPE to sample various energy regions of the neutron field. The standard NNS has seven HDPE cylinders which are nested together, similar to Russian nesting dolls, to measure neutrons of higher and higher energies.

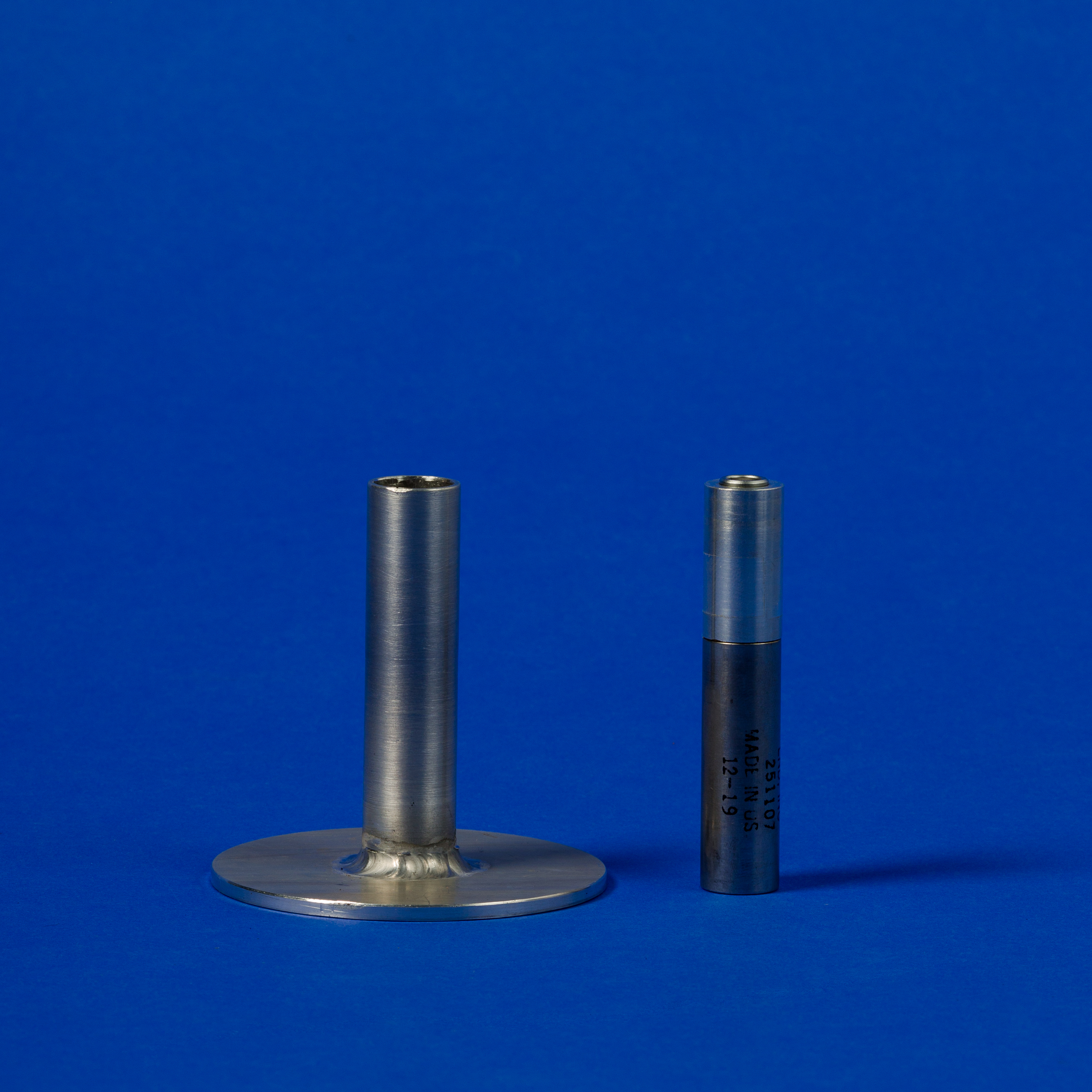
A He-3 Proportional Counter standing beside a metal stand.

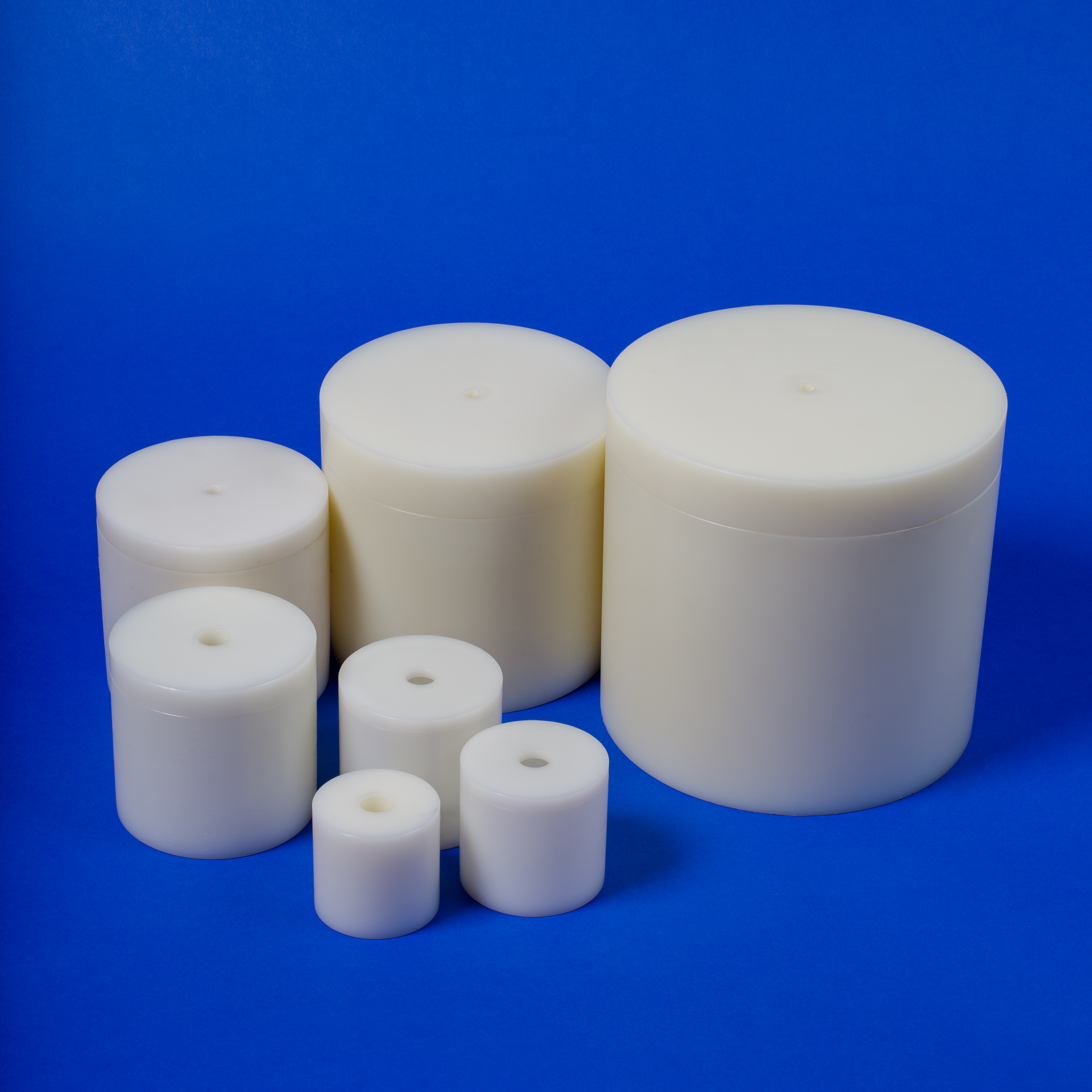
The seven standard HDPE nesting cylinders which make up the moderating assembly of the Nested Neutron Spectrometer. (Note lids of the cylinders are on.)

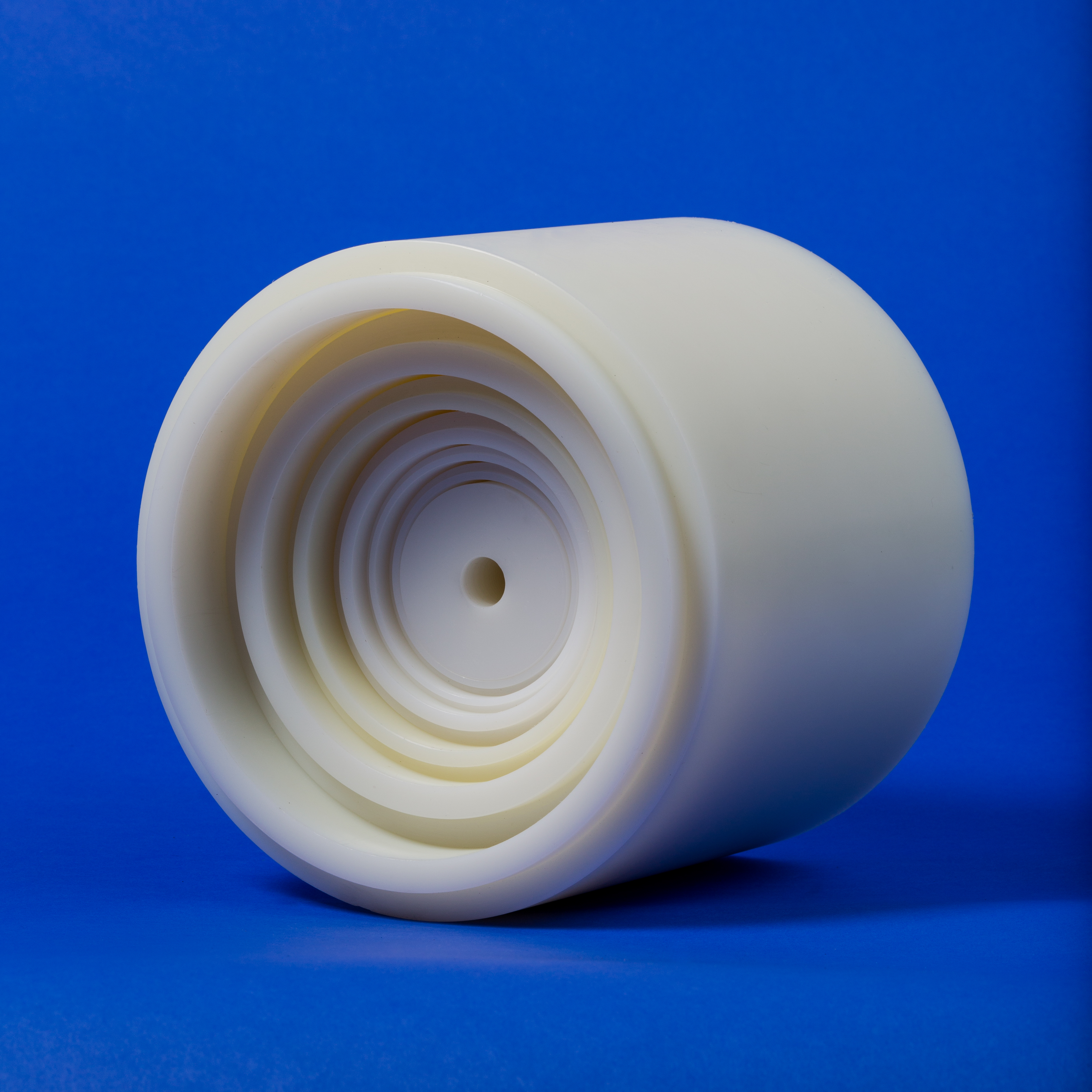
The seven standard HDPE nesting cylinders which make up the moderating assembly of the nested neutron spectrometer. (Note cylinders do not have their lids on.)

== Sample neutron spectra ==
Shown below are spectra of two standard calibration sources measured by the NNS. The measured spectra (blue) is compared to the ISO standard spectra (red). Both Measurements were made at the NIST low scatter facility in Washington, DC.

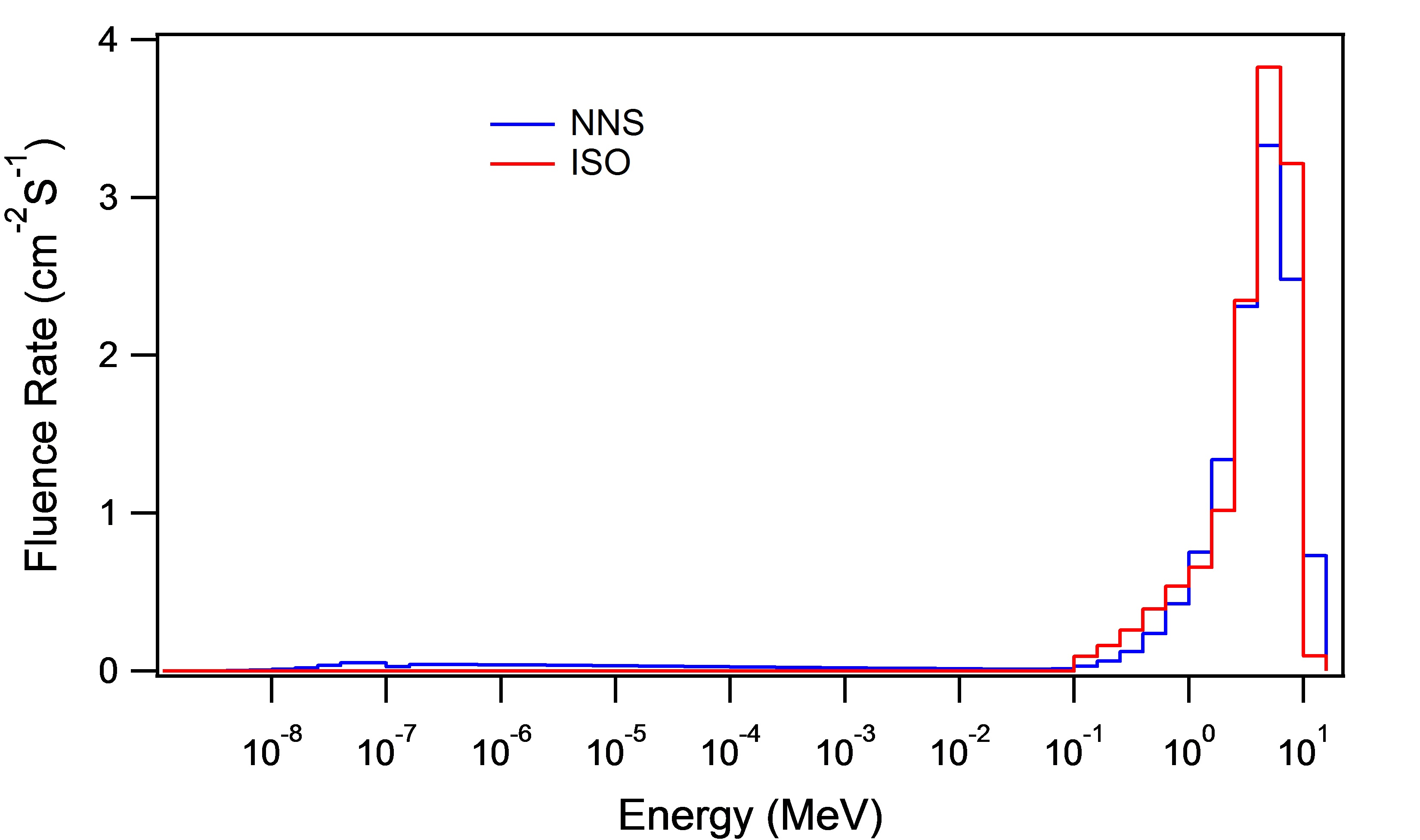
Nested Neutron Spectrometer measurements of AmBe neutron source. Comparison to ISO standard spectrum.

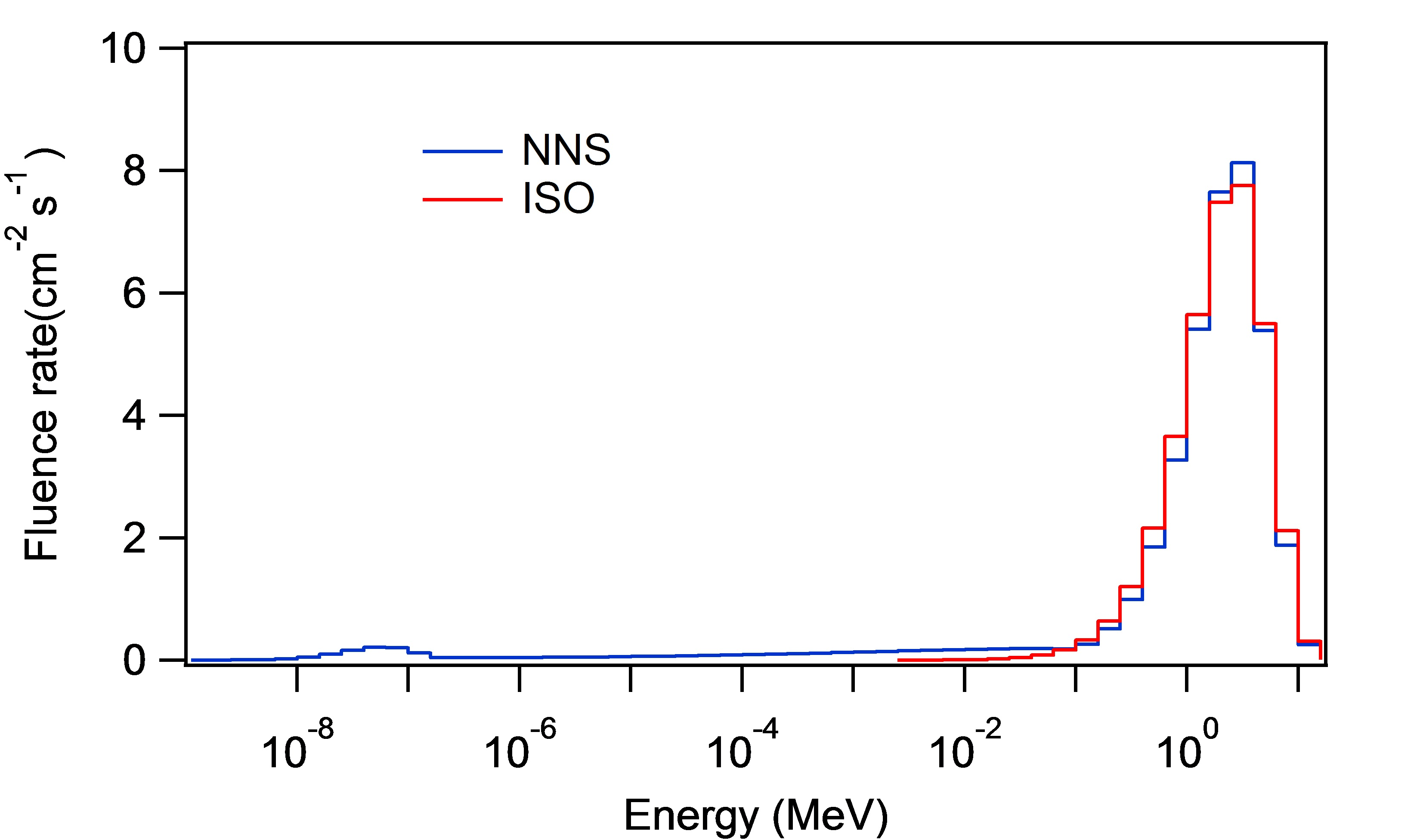
Nested Neutron Spectrometer measurements of a bare Cf source neutron source. Comparison to ISO standard spectrum.
