= Professor of Natural Philosophy (Glasgow) =

The Chair of Natural Philosophy is a professorship at the University of Glasgow, in Scotland, which was established in 1727

The Nova Erectio of King James VI of Scotland shared the teaching of moral philosophy, logic and natural philosophy among the regents.

In 1727 separate chairs were instituted.

In 1986, the departments of Natural Philosophy and Astronomy were merged and formed the new department of Physics and Astronomy.

In 2024, Miles Padgett holds the Kelvin Chair of Natural Philosophy at the University of Glasgow.

== Professors of natural philosophy ==
- Robert Dick Snr MA MD (1727)
- Robert Dick Jnr MA MD (1751)
- John Anderson MA (1757)
- James Brown MA MD (1796)
- William Meikleham MA LLD (1803)
- William Thomson, 1st Baron Kelvin of Largs GCVO MA DCL LLD FRS (1846)
- Andrew Gray MA LLD FRS (1899)
- Harold Albert Wilson MA DSc FRS (1924)
- Edward Taylor Jones DSc LLD (1926)
- Philip Ivor Dee CBE MA FRS
- Robert Patton Ferrier BSc MA PhD FRSE (1973)

== See also ==
- List of Professorships at the University of Glasgow
