= Jennifer Bonner =

American architect (born 1979)

- Born: 1979 (age 46–47); Huntsville, Alabama, USA

Academic background
- Education: B.A., Auburn University; M.A. 2009, Harvard University Graduate School of Design
- Website: jenniferbonner.com

Jennifer R. Bonner (born 1979) is an American architectural designer. She is an associate professor and Co-Director of the Master in Architecture II Program at Harvard University Graduate School of Design.

== Early life and education ==
Bonner was born and raised in Alabama. She attended Auburn University and Harvard University Graduate School of Design, where she earned the James Templeton Kelley Prize for her project "Assemblage of Twins". Before entering graduate school, she travelled to the United Kingdom and worked for architecture firms Foster + Partners and David Chipperfield Architects.

== Career ==
After graduating, Bonner opened her own architecture firm in Boston called Mass Architectural Loopty Loops (MALL). She also earned the inaugural Woodbury School of Architecture teaching fellowship for the 2010–11 academic year. Upon her return, she accepted an assistant professor position at Georgia Institute of Technology (GIT). As a faculty member at GIT, Bonner opened an exhibit titled "Domestic Hats," which was a jumping point for her to add a course to the 2013–2014 academic year undergraduate curriculum titled, It's All about the Roof. Using the aid of sophomore students, she collected data across the United States that predicted future conceptual projects that might happen in Atlanta. She was subsequently awarded the 2014 Young Architects Forum Atlanta Emerging Voices Award.

The following year, Bonner joined the faculty at Harvard University Graduate School of Design as an associate professor and by 2017, she was named the Co-Director of the Master in Architecture II Program. During this time, she also revealed her design for modern-day offices based on a previous project called "Best Sandwiches". Her modern design, which she calls Office Stack, allows each floor to act on its own accord as separate entities. Her design was implemented into an office in Huntsville, Alabama and earned her the 2019 Progressive Architecture Award.

That same year, Bonner designed a house called "Haus Gables" inspired by Atlanta's architecture. Haus Gables is 2,200 square feet, two-storeys, and contains various jagged geometry pieces to create a pitched roof. She created the asymmetrical roofline by clustering gables, as well as cross-laminated timber (CLT) to form one roof. Her firm MALL also received the Architectural League Prize for Young Architects + Designers.

== Personal life ==
Bonner and her husband have one daughter together.
