= Bonner sphere =

A Bonner sphere is a device used to determine the energy spectrum of a neutron beam. The method was first described in 1960 by Rice University's Bramblett, Ewing and Tom W. Bonner and employs thermal neutron detectors embedded in moderating spheres of different sizes. Comparison of the neutrons detected by each sphere allows accurate determination of the neutron energy. This detector system utilizes a few channel unfolding techniques to determine the coarse, few group neutron spectrum. The original detector system was capable of measuring neutrons between thermal energies up to ~20 MeV. These detectors have been modified to provide additional resolution above 20 MeV to energies up to 1 GeV.

== Bonner sphere spectroscopy ==
Because of the complexity with which neutrons interact with the environment, precise determination of the neutron energy is quite difficult. Bonner sphere spectroscopy (BSS) is one of the few methods that provide an accurate measure of the neutron spectrum.

== Remball ==
A single Bonner sphere of an appropriate size can be used for dosimetry, as the sensitivity of the detector will approximate the radiation weighting factor across a range of neutron energies. Such Bonner spheres are sometimes known as a remball.

== See also ==
- Neutron detection
