= Neutron spectroscopy =

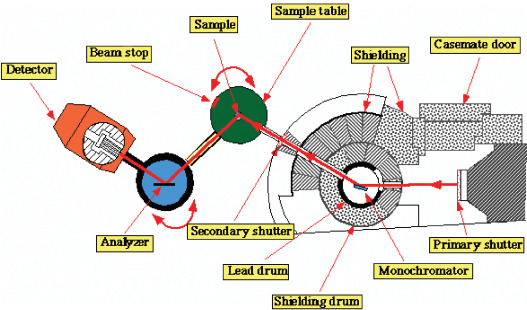
Scheme of a neutron triple-axis spectrometer at a neutron reactor (IN1 at the Institut Laue Langevin, ILL, Grenoble).

Neutron spectroscopy is a spectroscopic method of measuring atomic and magnetic motions by measuring the kinetic energy of emitted neutrons. The measured neutrons may be emitted directly (for example, by nuclear reactions), or they may scatter off cold matter before reaching the detector. Inelastic neutron scattering observes the change in the energy and wavevector of the neutron as it scatters from a sample. This can be used to probe a wide variety of different physical phenomena such as the motions of atoms (diffusional or hopping), the rotational modes of molecules, sound modes and molecular vibrations, recoil in quantum fluids, magnetic and quantum excitations or even electronic transitions.

Since its discovery, neutron spectroscopy has become useful in medicine as it has been applied to radiation protection and radiation therapy. It is also used in nuclear fusion experiments, where the neutron spectrum can be used to infer the plasma temperature, density, and composition, in addition to the total fusion power.

Neutron spectroscopy is routinely conducted with a wide range of neutron energies, from as low as a few hundredths of an electronvolt to as high as tens of megaelectronvolts. Much current research focuses on expanding these capabilities to higher energies. In 2001, US researchers were able to measure neutrons with energies up to 100 gigaelectronvolts

== Scattering interactions involved in neutron spectroscopy ==
There are three different types of scattering interactions that allow for the probing of a variety of properties using neutrons: nuclear scattering (coherent scattering), spin-dependent nuclear scattering (incoherent scattering), and magnetic dipole interactions between the neutron and dipolar field of unpaired electrons. In most cases, coherent scattering and incoherent scattering are used to investigate molecular properties.

With these scattering interactions, it is possible to probe diffusive motions in liquid water such as translational and rotational motions since the energies associated with this action are on the order of about 1 meV. Neutron spectroscopy can also be used to probe inter and intramolecular vibrational modes as the energies associated with such transfers are around 400-500 meV which is still within the range of energies possible for this method.

=== Coherent nuclear scattering ===
The first type of interaction is nuclear scattering occurs when neutrons interact with nuclei through the very short range nuclear force. The wavelength, λ, is on the order of a few angstroms (Å). Because a thermal neutron cannot “see” the internal structure of a nucleus, the scattering is considered to be isotropic. This interaction is thus characterized by a scattering length of b, which is on the same order of the size of a nucleus (10^{−15} m). Therefore, nuclear scattering allows for the probing of density correlations of nucleons in the nucleus.

=== Incoherent nuclear scattering ===
The second type of interaction is spin-dependent nuclear scattering, which is when the neutron and nucleus interaction depends on the total spin (spin of the neutron, ½, and spin of the nucleus, I) formed during the scattering event. The two possible states thus become I + ½ and I – ½. This spin dependence thus results in incoherent scattering, which allows for the probing of single-particle motion as well as the study of the ordering of nuclear spins at ultra-low temperatures.

=== Magnetic dipole interaction ===
The third type of interaction is between the magnetic dipole moment of the neutron and the dipolar field from unpaired electrons. This allows the total spin of the unpaired electrons and neutron to be probed. The magnetic scattering length from one electron is b_{m} = 𝛾r_{0} = 1.348 fm which is on the same order of magnitude as the nuclear scattering length. Because of the dipole-dipole character of the interaction, the scattering is considered to be anisotropic.

== See also ==
- Neutron diffraction
- Raman scattering
- Nested Neutron Spectrometer
